= Ore grade =

Concentration of a commodity in ore

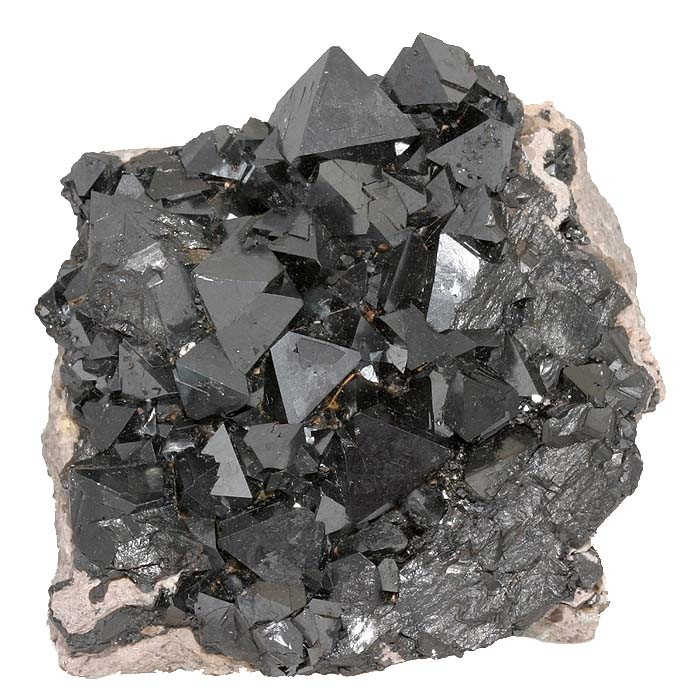
Iron content of pure magnetite is 72%, but due to impurities, raw magnetite's actual ore grade is much lower.

Ore grade is a measure describing the concentration of a commodity (e.g. metal or minerals) in ore. For metals sold in oxide form (such as tungsten and uranium), the grade may describe the percentage of oxide content (WO_{3} and U_{2}O_{8} respectively).

Ore grade is used to assess the economic feasibility of a mining operation; the concentration of the commodity must be high enough so that it outweighs the cost of extracting it. The ore grade required for economic feasibility varies widely based on the value of the material being mined. The lowest grade that is feasible to mine is called a cut-off grade and is determined using various economic and political considerations.

Ore grades are usually expressed as an amount per ton or metric ton of ore, though ore grades for base metals are usually expressed as a percentage or in parts per million. Grade of a deposit of an industrial mineral is of less importance than that for a metal ore, as many minerals are used in bulk, and homogeneity and other properties (for example, the color for the limestone) might be critical.

There are multiple points in the mining process ("streams") where the grade ("assay") can be valued:

- assayed grade (also measured grade, in-situ grade) is the result of assaying of the ore body;
- head grade is the grade of the ore as removed from the mine (and delivered to the ore mill as feed grade). Head grade is lower than the assayed one, as the mining process frequently includes the wall rock (overburden) with the extracted ore (so called mining dilution);
- concentrate grade is the grade of the output of the mill, limited by the chemical composition of the ore. For example, if the ore contains copper only as chalcopyrite (CuFeS_{2}), the attainable grade is no more than 34.6%. The ratio between the amount of commodity in the feed and in the concentrate is called recovery. For example, 90% recovery of a metal indicates that 10% were "rejected", sent by the mill into the tailings along with the gangue.

== Sources ==
- Evans, Anthony M. (2013-07-03). "Ore grade". Ore Geology and Industrial Minerals: An Introduction. John Wiley & Sons. ISBN 978-1-118-68502-0.
- Wills, Barry A.; Finch, James A. (2016). "Introduction". Wills' Mineral Processing Technology. Elsevier. 1.9.1 Grade. doi:10.1016/b978-0-08-097053-0.00001-7. ISBN 978-0-08-097053-0.
