= Factory and Workshop Act 1895 =

Act of the Parliament of the United Kingdom

Factory and Workshop Act 1895 (Note: Section 56.)
- Act of Parliament
- Parliament of the United Kingdom
- Long title: An Act to amend and extend the Law relating to Factories and Workshops.
- Citation: 58 & 59 Vict. c. 37
- Territorial extent: United Kingdom

Dates
- Royal assent: 6 July 1895
- Commencement: 1 January 1896 (Note: Section 55.)
- Repealed: 23 May 1950
Other legislation
Amends	Factory and Workshop Act 1878; Factory and Workshop Act 1883; Factory and Workshop Act 1891; Cotton Cloth Factories Act 1889; Notice of Accidents Act 1894
Repealed by	Factory and Workshop Act 1901; Statute Law Revision Act 1950
Relates to	Public Health (Ireland) Act 1874; Public Health (Ireland) Act 1878; Public Health Acts Amendment Act 1890

Status: Repealed

Text of statute as originally enacted

The Factory and Workshop Act 1895 (58 & 59 Vict. c. 37) was an act of the Parliament of the United Kingdom intended to regulate the conditions, safety, health and wages of people working in factories. It gives an example of the serious problems in UK labour law at the beginning of the 20th century.

== Subsequent developments ==
The whole act, except section 12, 24(3) and 28, was repealed by section 161 of, and part I of the seventh schedule to, the Factory and Workshop Act 1901 (1 Edw. 7. c. 22), which came into force on 1 January 1902.

The whole act, so far as unrepealed, was repealed by section 1 of, and the first schedule to, the Statute Law Revision Act 1950 (14 Geo. 6. c. 6), which came into force on 23 May 1950.

== See also ==
- History of labour law
- UK labour law
- UK labour law history
