= Mineral jig =

Process separating materials of different densities

In metallurgy, mineral jigs are a type of gravity concentrator, separating materials with different densities. It is widely used in recovering valuable heavy minerals such as gold, platinum, tin, tungsten, as well as gemstones such as diamond and sapphire, from alluvial or placer deposits. Base metals such as iron, manganese, and barite can also be recovered using jigs.

The process begins with flowing a stream of liquid-suspended material over a screen and subjecting the screen to a vertical hydraulic pulsation. This pulsation momentarily expands or dilates the screen bed and allows the heavier materials to work toward the bottom. Heavier material finer than the screen openings will gradually work through the beds and the retention screen into the hutch, or lower compartment. That material, the concentrate, is discharged from this compartment or hutch through a spigot. If the concentrate is coarser than the screen, it will work down to the top of the shot bed, and can be withdrawn either continuously or intermittently. The lighter material, or tailing, will be rejected over the end of the jig.

The mineral jig has certain advantages in placer and hardrock mill flowsheets. In gold recovery, the jigs produce highly concentrated products which can be easily upgraded by methods such as barrel amalgamation, treating across shaking tables or processing through centrifugal concentrators. In other placer operations the heavy minerals being sought are recovered efficiently and cheaply with similar high ratios of concentration. In iron, manganese, and base metal treatment flowsheets, the jigs are operated to produce marketable grades of concentrate, or, as pre-concentration devices, to reject barren gangue prior to the ore entering the fine grinding section of the mill flowsheet.

The construction of the mineral jig results in maximum utilization of floor area and minimum head room requirements, permitting greater capacity per unit of operating floor area than, for example, shaking tables or other devices such as jig concentrators.

== See also ==
- Jig concentrators
- Mineral processing
