= Geometallurgy =

Geometallurgy relates to the practice of combining geological understanding with metallurgical test work and / or real time processing plant data (for extractive metallurgy), to create a geological based three-dimensional predictive model of mineral processing response. It is used in the hard rock mining industry for risk management and mitigation during mineral processing plant design. It is also used for production mine planning to optimize the ore feed to the processing plant.

There are four important components or steps to developing a geometallurgical program,:

- the geologically informed selection of a number of ore samples
- laboratory-scale test work to determine the ore's response to mineral processing unit operations
- the distribution of these parameters throughout the orebody using an accepted geostatistical technique
- the application of a mining sequence plan and mineral processing models to generate a prediction of the process plant behavior

== Sample selection ==
The sample mass and size distribution requirements are dictated by the kind of mathematical model that will be used to simulate the process plant, and the test work required to provide the appropriate model parameters. Flotation testing usually requires several kg of sample and grinding/hardness testing can required between 2 and 300 kg.

The sample selection procedure is performed to optimize granularity, sample support, and cost. Samples are usually core samples composited over the height of the mining bench. For hardness parameters, the variogram often increases rapidly near the origin and can reach the sill at distances significantly smaller than the typical drill hole collar spacing. For this reason the incremental model precision due to additional test work is often simply a consequence of the central limit theorem, and secondary correlations are sought to increase the precision without incurring additional sampling and testing costs. These secondary correlations can involve multi-variable regression analysis with other, non-metallurgical, ore parameters and/or domaining by rock type, lithology, alteration, mineralogy, or structural domains.

== Test work ==
Geometallurgical test work is broken into those that impact comminution and those that impact recovery of the valuable component.

=== Comminution test work ===
The following tests are commonly used to generate inputs for geometallurgical modelling of comminution parameters, that is crushing, grinding and their associated energy use:

- Bond ball mill work index test
- Modified or comparative Bond ball mill index
- Bond rod mill work index and Bond low energy impact crushing work index
- SAGDesign test
- SMC test
- JK drop-weight test
- Point load index test
- SAG Power Index test (SPI(R))
- MFT test
- FKT, SKT, and SKT-WS tests
- Geopyörä breakage test

== Geostatistics ==
Block kriging is the most common geostatistical method used for interpolating metallurgical index parameters and it is often applied on a domain basis. Classical geostatistics require that the estimation variable be additive, and there is currently some debate on the additive nature of the metallurgical index parameters measured by the above tests. The Bond ball mill work index test is thought to be additive because of its units of energy; nevertheless, experimental blending results show a non-additive behavior. The SPI(R) value is known not to be an additive parameter, however errors introduced by block kriging are not thought to be significant . These issues, among others, are being investigated as part of the Amira P843 research program on Geometallurgical mapping and mine modelling.

== Mine plan and process models ==
The following process models are commonly applied to geometallurgy:

- The Bond equation
- The SPI calibration equation, CEET
- FLEET*
- SMC model
- Aminpro-Grind, Aminpro-Flot models

== See also ==
- Extractive metallurgy
- Geostatistics
- Mining
- Mineral Processing
- Mill (grinding)

== General references ==
- Isaaks, Edward H., and Srivastava, R. Mohan. An Introduction to Applied Geostatistics. Oxford University Press, Oxford, NY, USA, 1989.
- David, M., Handbook of Applied Advanced Geostatistical Ore Reserve Estimation. Elsevier, Amsterdam, 1988.
- Mineral Processing Plant Design, Practice, and Control - Proceedings. Ed. Mular, A., Halbe, D., and Barratt, D. Society for Mining, Metallurgy, and Exploration, Inc. 2002.
- Mineral Comminution Circuits - Their Operation and Optimisation. Ed. Napier-Munn, T.J., Morrell, S., Morrison, R.D., and Kojovic, T. JKMRC, The University of Queensland, 1996
