= Cutoff grade =

Minimum grade required for an ore to be profitable

A cutoff grade is the minimum grade required in order for a mineral or metal to be economically mined (or processed). Material above this grade is considered to be ore, while material below this grade is considered to be gangue.

The cutoff grade can be determined through a variety of methods, each of varying complexity. Cutoff grades are selected to achieve a certain objective, such as resource utilization or economic benefit. Dividing these objectives even further gives way to specific goals such as the maximization of total profits, immediate profits, and present value. It is important to recognize that the cutoff grade is not simply calculated to a definitive answer. It is in fact a strategic variable that has major implications on mine design. The cutoff grade is adapted as the economic environment changes with regard to metal prices and mining costs, and is therefore constantly changing. Metal value is not the only factor affecting the profitability of an ore block. The presence of unwanted material in an ore block may increase the processing cost. This is also considered when classifying waste rock and ore.
