= Factory and Workshop Act 1901 =

Act of the Parliament of the United Kingdom

Factory and Workshop Act 1901 (Note: Section 163.)
- Act of Parliament
- Parliament of the United Kingdom
- Long title: An Act to consolidate with Amendments the Factory and Workshop Acts.
- Citation: 1 Edw. 7. c. 22
- Territorial extent: United Kingdom

Dates
- Royal assent: 17 August 1901
- Commencement: 1 January 1902 (Note: Section 162.)
- Repealed: England and Wales and Scotland: 1 July 1938; Northern Ireland:
Other legislation
Amends	See § Repealed enactments
Repeals/revokes	See § Repealed enactments
Amended by	Employment of Women Act 1907; Factory and Workshop Act 1907; Police, Factories, & c. (Miscellaneous Provisions) Act 1916; Education Act 1921; Local Government Act 1933; Public Health Act 1936; Public Health (London) Act 1936
Repealed by	England and Wales and Scotland: Factories Act 1937; Northern Ireland: Quarries Act (Northern Ireland) 1927, Factories Act (Northern Ireland) 1938 and Education Act (Northern Ireland) 1947
Relates to	Fines Act (Ireland) 1851; Public Health Act 1875; Public Health (Ireland) Act 1878; Constabulary (Ireland) Act 1886; Public Health (London) Act 1891

Status: Repealed

Text of statute as originally enacted

The Factory and Workshop Act 1901 (1 Edw. 7. c. 22) was an act of the Parliament of the United Kingdom that consolidated and amended enactments relating to the regulation of factories and workshops.

== Provisions ==
=== Repealed enactments ===
Section 161 of the act repealed 9 enactments, listed in parts I and II of the seventh schedule to the act.

Part I - enactments repealed from the commencement of the act
Citation	Short title	Extent of repeal
41 & 42 Vict. c. 16	Factory and Workshop Act 1878	The whole act.
46 & 47 Vict. c. 53	Factory and Workshop Act 1883	The whole act.
52 & 53 Vict. c. 62	Cotton Cloth Factories Act 1889	The whole act.
54 & 55 Vict. c. 75	Factory and Workshop Act 1891	The whole act except sections eight, nine, ten and twelve and the First Schedule.
58 & 59 Vict. c. 37	Factory and Workshop Act 1895	The whole act except section twelve, subsection three of section twenty-four and section twenty-eight.
60 & 61 Vict. c. 58	Cotton Cloth Factories Act 1897	The whole act.
63 & 64 Vict. c. 27	Railway Employment (Prevention of Accidents) Act 1900	In subsection three of section thirteen the words "factory workshop or" wherever they occur and the words "the occupier of the factory or workshop or."

Part II - repealed from a date to be fixed by order of the secretary of state
Citation	Short title	Extent of repeal
54 & 55 Vict. c. 75	Factory and Workshop Act 1891	Sections eight, nine, ten and twelve and the First Schedule.
58 & 59 Vict. c. 37	Factory and Workshop Act 1895	Section twelve. Subsection three of section twenty-four. Section twenty-eight.

== Subsequent developments ==
The whole act was repealed for England and Wales and Scotland by section 159 of, and the fourth schedule to, the Factories Act 1937 (1 Edw. 8 & 1 Geo. 6. c. 67), which came into operation on 1 July 1938.
