= History of labour law =

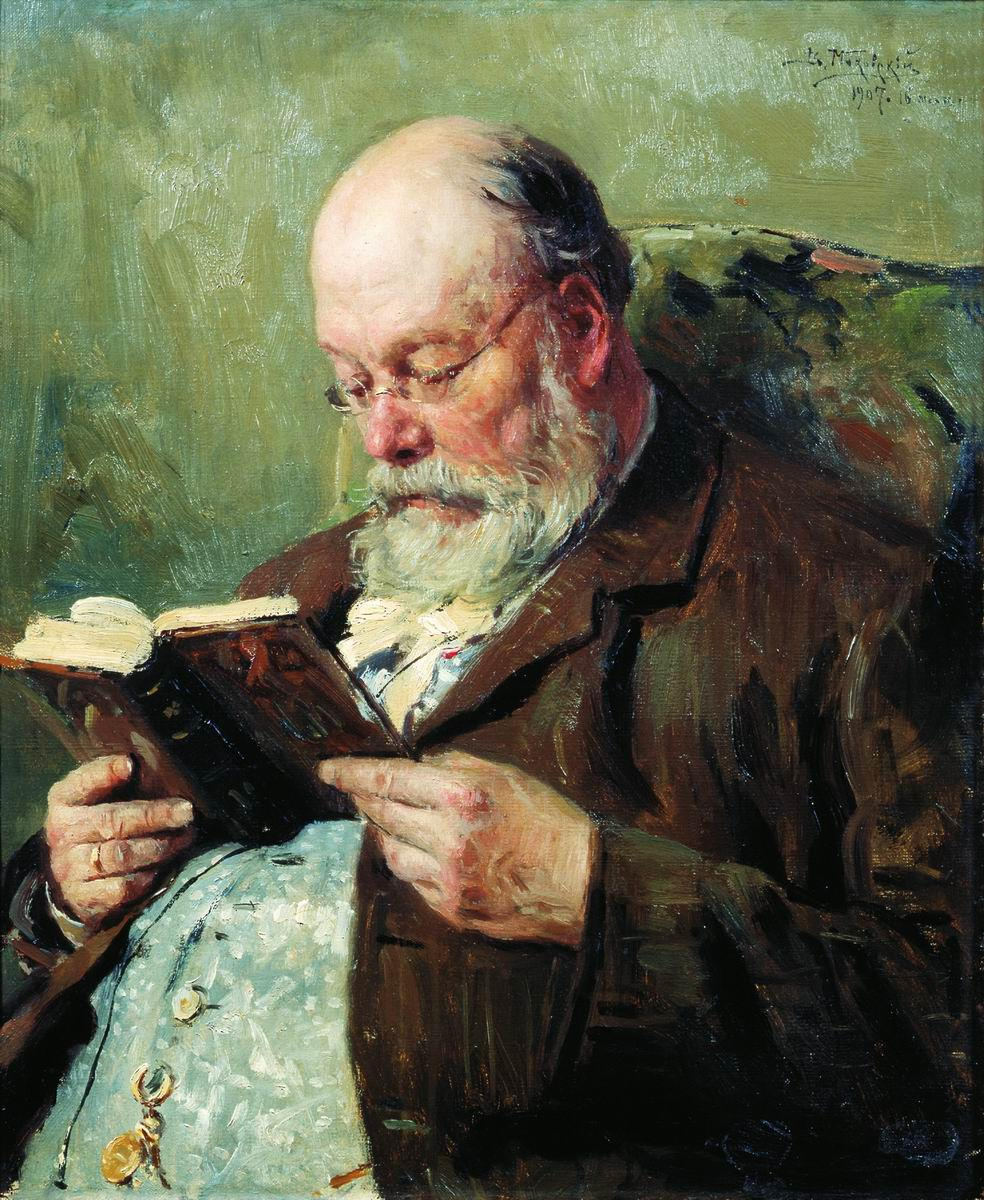
Ivan Yanzhul, the first factory inspector in the Russian Empire, helped enforce the liberal 1882 labour code.

The history of labour law concerns the development of labour law as a way of regulating and improving the life of people at work. In the civilisations of antiquity, the use of slave labour was widespread. Some of the maladies associated with unregulated labour were identified by Pliny as "diseases of slaves."

== English origins ==
As England was the first country to industrialise, it was also the first to face the often appalling consequences of capitalist exploitation in a totally unregulated and laissez-faire economic framework. Over the course of the late 18th and early to mid-19th century the foundation for modern labour law was slowly laid, as some of the more egregious aspects of working conditions were steadily ameliorated through legislation. This was largely achieved through the concerted pressure from social reformers, notably Anthony Ashley-Cooper, 7th Earl of Shaftesbury, and others.

=== Campaign against child labour ===
A serious outbreak of fever in 1784 in cotton mills near Manchester drew widespread public opinion against the use of children in dangerous conditions. A local inquiry presided over by Dr Thomas Percival, was instituted by the justices of the peace for Lancashire, and the resulting report recommended the limitation of children's working hours. In 1802, the first major piece of labour legislation was passed – the Health and Morals of Apprentices Act 1802 (42 Geo. 3. c. 73). This was the first, albeit modest, step towards the protection of labour. It targeted the deficiencies of the apprentice system, under which large numbers of pauper children were worked in cotton and woollen mills without education, for excessive hours, under awful conditions. The act limited working hours to twelve a day and abolished night work. It required the provision of a basic level of education for all apprentices, as well as adequate sleeping accommodation and clothing.

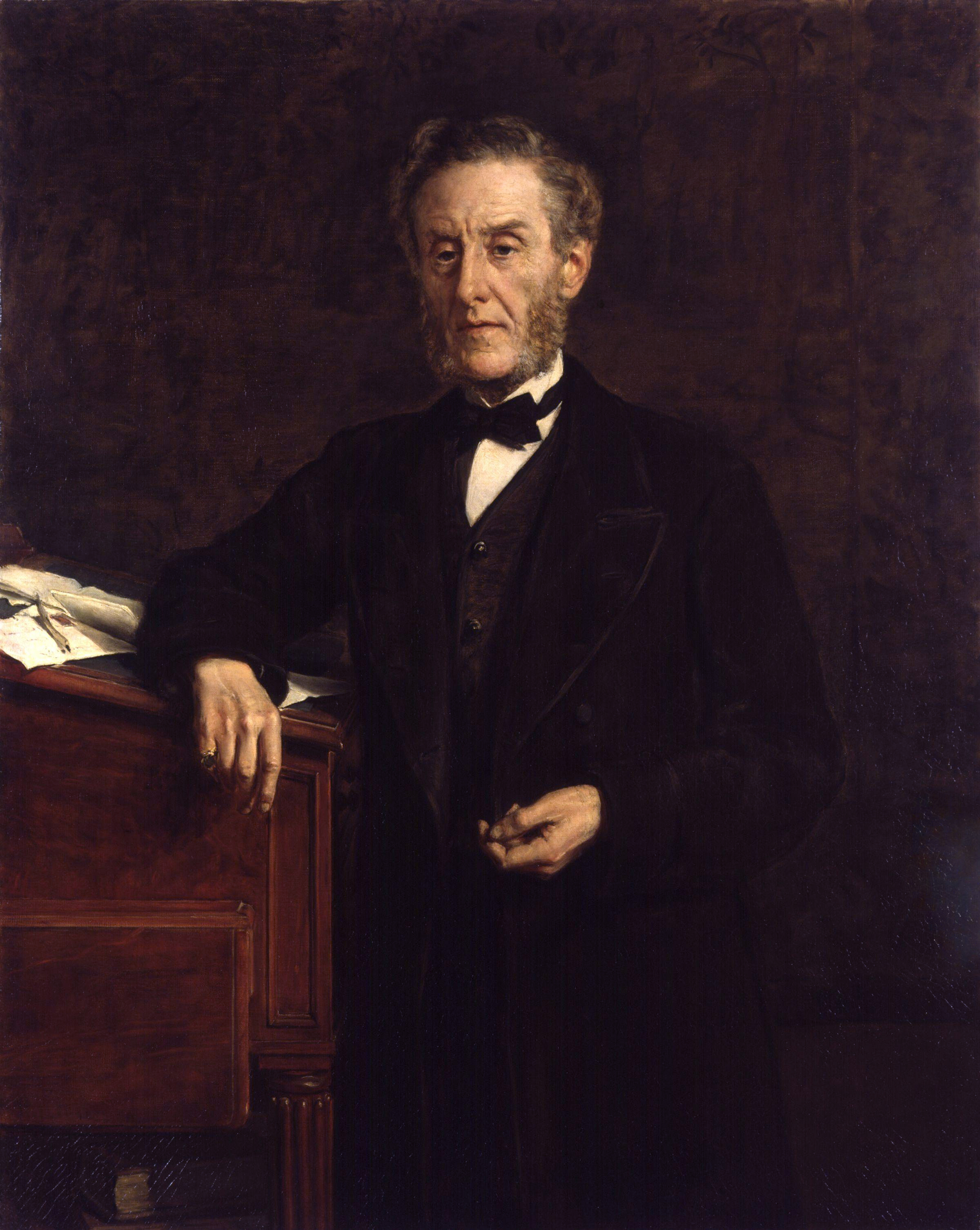
The Earl of Shaftesbury led a campaign to abolish child labour, which led to the passage of a series of Factory Acts in the mid 19th century.

The rapid industrialisation of manufacturing at the turn of the 19th century led to a rapid increase in child employment, and public opinion was steadily made aware of the terrible conditions these children were forced to endure. The Cotton Mills and Factories Act 1819 was the outcome of the efforts of the industrialist Robert Owen and prohibited child labour under nine years of age and limited the working day to twelve.

A great milestone in labour law was reached with the Labour of Children, etc., in Factories Act 1833, which limited the employment of children under eighteen years of age, prohibited all night work and, crucially, provided for inspectors to enforce the law. Pivotal in the campaigning for and the securing of this legislation were Michael Sadler and the Earl of Shaftesbury. This act was an important step forward, in that it mandated skilled inspection of workplaces and a rigorous enforcement of the law by an independent governmental body. This legislation was further amended by the Factories Act 1844, which strengthened the powers of the inspectors and required certified surgeons to examine all workers for physical fitness.

A lengthy campaign to limit the working day to ten hours was led by Shaftesbury, and included support from the Anglican Church. Many different groups, including many Quakers, workers, and even some factory owners like John Fielden also supported it. Many committees were formed in support of the cause and some previously established groups lent their support as well. One of the most influential groups to spring up was the "Ten Hours' Advocate and the Journal of Literature and Art". The campaign finally led to the passage of the Factory Act 1847, which restricted the working hours of women and children in British factories to effectively 10 hours per day. The debate had been a rather contentious one in Parliament and was defeated several times by a coalition of conservatives and free traders.

=== Working conditions ===
These early efforts were principally aimed at limiting child labour. From the mid-19th century, attention was first paid to the plight of working conditions for the workforce in general. For the first time detailed provisions for health and safety began to make their appearance in the law. Workers' compensation for preventible injuries was the outcome of a discussion by witnesses before the a royal commission in 1841. A year later, the Mines and Collieries Act 1842 excluded women and girls from underground working, and limited the employment of boys under the age of ten. It was not until 1850 that systematic reporting of fatal accidents and until 1855 that other safeguards for health, life and limb in mines were seriously provided by law.

From 1843 onwards, the Board of Health began issuing annual reports on the state of health and safety in the industry. Inspection was made more rigorous from 1850, and the Coal Mines Act 1855 (18 & 19 Vict. c. 108) provided seven further regulations, relating to ventilation, fencing of disused shafts, signalling standards, proper gauges and valve for steam-boiler, indicator and brake for machine lowering and raising; it also provided that special rules submitted by mine-owners to the secretary of state, could gain legislative sanction and be enforceable through penalties.

Various inquests discovered the extent to which incompetent management and neglect was to blame for workplace accidents and legislation. This led to the Coal Mines Regulation Act 1872 (35 & 36 Vict. c. 76) that required the employ of specifically certified managers. The certificates were issued by a government agency to candidates after passing a series of examinations. The steady development of the coal industry, increasing association among miners, and increased scientific knowledge paved the way for the extension and rationalisation of the then-current legislation to a greater variety of industries.

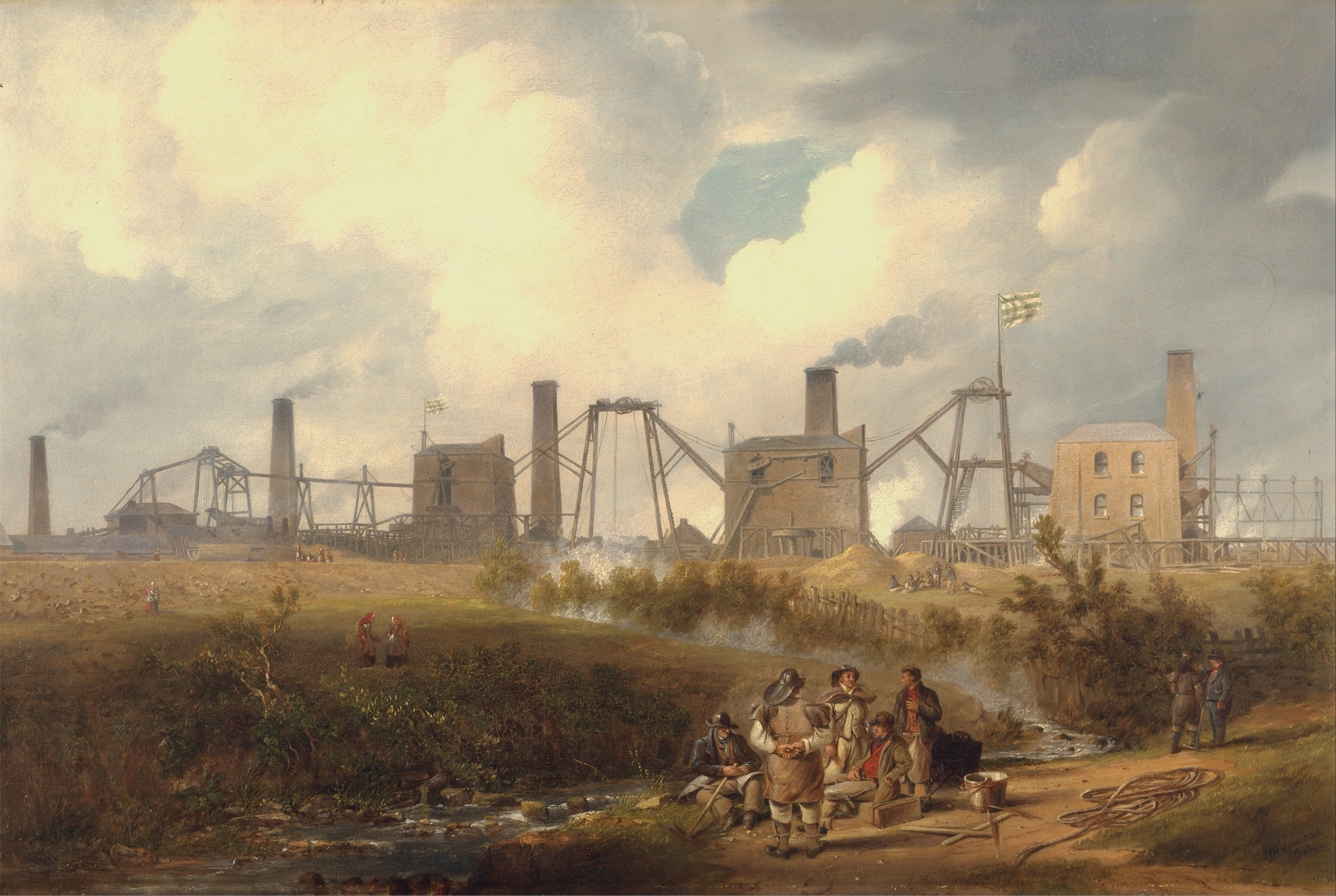
A view of Murton colliery near Seaham, United Kingdom, 1843

The Coal Mines Regulation Act 1872 also included the first comprehensive code of regulation to govern legal safeguards for health, life and limb. For instance, in the coal mining industry, the provision of safety lamps was made compulsory, use of explosives was regulated, and the shaft roof was required to be properly secured at all times. Any wilful neglect of these safety provisions became strictly punishable. But the most important new step lay in the sections relating to daily control and supervision of every mine by a manager holding a certificate of competency from the government, granted after passing an examination. Increased levels of inspection were also provided for.

The remit of the law steadily expanded to incorporate more industries, as reformers moved from one pressing issue to another. Other trades that came under legislative scrutiny included bleaching and dyeing works, lace factories, and textile finishing, bakehouses, earthenware-making, match-making, cartridge making and paper-staining. As the result of inquiries by expert medical and sanitary commissioners, ventilation was required to remove dangerous gases, dust, and other impurities generated in all factories.

By the end of the century, a comprehensive set of regulations had been put in place in England. Although the law would undergo further refinement over the following century, its basic contours were already discernible. As other countries industrialised in the late 19th century, they too adopted a similar legal system to prevent and mitigate large scale abuse in the industry.

== Ancient Islamic societies ==
Measures aimed at ensuring good working conditions were carried out during the days of early Islam. An example of this can be found under the Rashidun Caliphate, in which measures were introduced to ensure that fair wages were paid, hours of work were regulated, and labour exploitation was prevented. Similarly, under the Umayyad Caliphate, administrative reforms were introduced to ensure fair treatment of workers while public works programs were carried out to provide jobs. Under the Abbasid Caliphate, guilds were developed which (according to one study) “played a crucial role in regulating labor practices, setting standards for wages and working conditions, and ensuring that workers were not exploited.” Under the Mughal Empire, measures aimed at safeguarding labour rights were carried out, with one study stating that the Mughals “emphasized the importance of fair wages and the provision of necessities for workers, reflecting the broader Islamic principles of justice and equity.”

According to one observer

For about a thousand years there was no accumulation of wealth in a few hands, no hoarding and no profiteering, as these had been tabooed in Islam … the state was responsible for providing a living wage or relief to every inhabitant…there were neither slums nor multi-millionaires.”

== Inca Empire ==
Various measures were undertaken to regulate working conditions during the rule of the Incas. According to one observer, J.H. Standing, “Great care was taken that work should not fall disproportionately heavy on anyone.” Pearl fishing was prohibited due to its being seen as a hurtful and hazardous occupation, while conditions in mining (such as the length of time that someone would work in this occupation) was regulated to the point that, according to Standing, “none felt it a hardship, much less was his life shortened by it.” Standing has also praised the measures taken by the Inca state to prevent hunger and to support older people, with men relieved of heavy toil when they reached the age of fifty and provided with “a complete and honourable maintenance” at the age of sixty.

Another study has noted how citizens paid taxes in the form of labor, with the state in turn “obliged to see that all citizens were adequately provided with food, clothing, housing, and the other necessities of life.”

One 1899 study, however, has noted the authoritarian nature of the Inca state, stating that

the Inca , or king , owned practically all the property in the country, and provided work and wages for every one of his subjects. There was no starvation, but there was no liberty. Every man had enough for himself and his family, but he had no voice in the affairs of the state. The right to work was acknowledged, but not the right to vote.

== Australia and New Zealand ==
During the late 19th century, liberals in Australia set out to tackle poor working conditions in colonial factories. With the exception of Western Australia, all of the colonial parliaments passed acts aimed at regulating and supervising workshops and factories. By the 1900s, the Australian colonies had acquired a reputation in the United States and Europe (as noted by one authority) "as a paradise for the working man, where minimum wages, factory acts, conciliation, arbitration and trade unions had introduced the workers to a measure of middle-class affluence". Following the establishment of the Commonwealth of Australia in 1901, state governments continued to be active during the early Twentieth Century in influencing working conditions with laws passed affecting matters such as the security and level of pay, workers’ accommodation, the inspection of machinery, accident liability, age limits, and working hours. Federal governments also passed measures during this period of benefit to labour, amongst which included the encouragement of fair levels of pay, the establishment of compensation for seamen and commonwealth employees, and the introduction of national old age and invalidity pensions.

Similarly, in New Zealand, successive governments during the 19th and early 20th centuries passed a wide range of measures designed to improve working conditions, affecting areas such as methods and levels of pay, holidays, hours of work, and health and safety. New Zealand acquired a reputation as a "paradise for the working man" owing to the advanced social legislation of these periods, with one 1904 journal arguing that "If laws can make a paradise for the working man, New Zealand is surely such a paradise, for his interests are hedged about with barbed wire laws which it would seem almost impossible for the most grasping capitalist or the most soulless corporation to break through."

Commenting on New Zealand's progressive reputation in regards to labor rights, one journal from 1910 described it as the "one country where the working people get things without fighting for them," adding that the government at that time

runs all public utilities, including banks and coal mines, compels arbitration of labor disputes, guarantees titles, buys all patents, acts as trustee for estates, gives free railroad passes to men seeking work, gives unemployed work in state forest until they find a better job, requires seats for girls in stores, and makes loans to home builders. Groups of workmen may organize, elect a foreman, and the state lets public work to them. Thus the contractor is eliminated. The Saturday half-holiday is universal in factories.

Commenting on the progressive labor legislation implemented in Australia and New Zealand, one European study from 1910 noted that

Outside the Continent Socialism is practically confined to certain of the English-speaking countries. These are the United Kingdom, the United States, and the colonies of Australia and New Zealand. The last have realized more Socialistic measures than any other States in the world, and their experiences are reacting and New upon European theory. Every Australian colony possesses a separate Labour party, but in New Zealand Labour has amalgamated with a very advanced sort of Radicalism to form a Progressive party. The Queensland Labour party is the only one which has been Socialist in an orthodox sense; it was also until 1903 the least compromising, and has least influenced government. The others, which all grew up out of defeated trade-unionism, have squeezed their Socialistic legislation, as in France and Italy, out of non-Socialist allies. Its effect has been to emphasize the value and possibilities of the State regulation of industry as against State-ownership in the more obvious sense. Not only have factory and workshop regulations been carried much further than in Europe, but two quite new principles have been put into practice — the State enforcement of minimum wage-rates and the State-enforcement of industrial peace. The former was realized by the system of wage-boards, established in Victoria in 1896, and in South Australia in 1900; while both have been attained by that of compulsory State-arbitration in trade disputes, first devised in New Zealand in 1894 by the Hon. W. P. Reeves. Of these systems Mr. Reeves's, as amended by experience, has prevailed; and not only does New Zealand persist in it, but New South Wales (1901), West Australia (1902), and the Commonwealth Government have paid it the compliment of imitation.

== France ==
In France, the working day was first limited in factories for adults in 1848, to 12. The workplaces covered by this law was clarified in 1885 to include industrial establishments with motor power or continual furnaces, or workshops employing over 20 workers. In 1851, under condition of notification to the local authorities, exceptions, still in force, were made to the general limitation, in favour of certain industries or processes, among others for letterpress and lithographic printing, engineering works, work at furnaces and in heating workshops, manufacture of projectiles of war, and any work for the government in the interests of national defence or security. The limit of 12 hours was reduced, as regards works in which women or young workers are employed, in 1900 to II, and was to be successively reduced to 102 hours and to hours at intervals of two years from April 1900.

This labour law for adults was preceded in 1841 by one for children, which prevented their employment in factories before 8 years of age and prohibited night labour for any child under 13. This was strengthened in 1874, particularly as regards employment of girls under 21, but it was not until 1892 that the labour of women was specially regulated by a law, still in force, with certain amendments in 1900. Under this law factory and workshop labour is prohibited for children under 13 years, though they may begin at 12 if qualified by the prescribed educational certificate and medical certificate of fitness. The limit of daily hours of employment is the same as for adult labour, and, similarly, from 1 April 1902 was 102, and two years later became io hours in the 24. Notice of the hours must be affixed, and meal-times or pauses with absolute cessation of work of at least one hour must be specified. By the act of 1892 one day in the week, not necessarily Sunday, had to be given for entire absence from work, in addition to eight recognized annual holidays, but this was modified by a law of 1906 which generally requires Sunday rest, but allows substitution of another day in certain industries and certain circumstances. Night labour – work between 9 p.m. and 5 a.m. – is prohibited for workers under 18, and only exceptionally permitted, under conditions, for girls and women over 18 in specified trades. In mines and underground quarries employment of women and girls is prohibited except at surface works, and at the latter is subject to the same limits as in factories. Boys of 13 may be employed in certain work underground, but under 16 may not be employed more than 8 hours in the 24 from bank to bank. A law of 1905 provided for miners a 9 hours' day and in 1907 an 8 hours' day from the foot of the entrance gallery back to the same point.

As in Great Britain, distinct services of inspection enforce the law in factories and mines respectively. In factories and workshops an inspector may order re-examination as to physical fitness for the work imposed of any worker under 16; certain occupations and processes are prohibited – e.g. girls under 16 at machines worked by treadles, and the weights that may be lifted, pushed or carried by girls or boys under 18 are carefully specified. The law applies generally to philanthropic and religious institutions where industrial work is carried on, as in ordinary trading establishments; and this holds good even if the work is by way of technical instruction. Domestic workshops are not controlled unless the industry is classed as dangerous or unhealthy; introduction of motor power brings them under inspection.

General sanitation in industrial establishments is provided for in a law of 1893, amended in 1903, and is supplemented by administrative regulations for special risks due to poisons, dust, explosive substances, gases, fumes, &c. Ventilation, both general and special, lighting, provision of lavatories, cloakrooms, good drinking water, drainage and cleanliness are required in all workplaces, shops, warehouses, restaurant kitchens, and where workers are lodged by their employers hygienic conditions are prescribed for dormitories. In many industries women, children and young workers are either absolutely excluded from specified unhealthy processes, or are admitted only under conditions. As regards shops and offices, the labour laws are: one which protects apprentices against overwork (law of 22 February 1851), one (law of 29 December 1900) which requires that seats shall be provided for women and girls employed in retail sale of articles, and a decree of 28 July 1904 defining in detail conditions of hygiene in dormitories for workmen and shop assistants. The law relating to seats is enforced by the inspectors of factories.

In France there is no special penal legislation against abuses of the truck system, or excessive fines and deductions from wages, although bills with that end in view have frequently been before parliament. Indirect protection to workers is no doubt in many cases afforded in organized industries by the action of the Conseils de Prud'hommes. Belgium. – In 1848 in Belgium the Commission on Labour proposed legislation to limit, as in France, the hours of labour for adults, but this proposal was never passed. Belgian regulation of labour in industry remains essentially, in harmony with its earliest beginnings in 1863 and onwards, a series of specialized provisions to meet particular risks of individual trades, and did not, until 1889, give any adherence to a common principle of limitation of hours and times of labour for " protected " persons. This was in the law of 13 December 1889, which applies to mines, quarries, factories, workshops classed as unhealthy, wharves and docks, transports. As in France, industrial establishments having a charitable or philanthropic or educational character are included. The persons protected are girls and women under 21 years, and boys under 16; and women over 21 only find a place in the law through the prohibition of their employment within four weeks after childbirth. As the hours of labour of adult women remain ordinarily unlimited by law, so are the hours of boys from 16 to 21. The law of Sunday rest dated 17 July 1905, however, applies to labour generally in all industrial and commercial undertakings except transport and fisheries, with certain regulated exceptions for (a) cases of breakdown or urgency due to force majeure, (b) certain repairs and cleaning, (c) perishable materials, (d) retail food supply. Young workers are excluded from the exceptions. The absolute prohibitions of employment are: for children under 12 years in any industry, manufacturing or mining or transport, and for women and girls under 21 years below the surface in working of mines. Boys under. 16 years and women and girls under 21 years may in general not be employed before 5 a.m. or after 9 p.m., and one day in the seven is to be set apart for rest from employment; to these rules exception may be made either by royal decree for classes or groups of processes, or by local authorities in exceptional cases. The exceptions may be applied, generally, only to workers over 14 years, but in mines, by royal decree, boys over 12 years may be employed from 4 a.m. The law of 1889 fixes only a maximum of 12 hours of effective work, to be interrupted by pauses for rest of not less than 12 hours, empowering the king by decree to formulate more precise limits suited to the special circumstances of individual industries. Royal decrees have accordingly laid down the conditions for many groups, including textile trades, manufacture of paper, pottery, glass, clothing, mines, quarries, engineering and printing works. In some the daily limit is 10 hours, but in more 102 or I I hours. In a few exceptionally unhealthy trades, such as the manufacture of lucifer matches, vulcanization of india-rubber by means of carbcn bi-sulphide, the age of exclusion from employment has been raised, and in the last-named process hours have been reduced to 5, broken into two spells of 21. hours each.

As a rule the conditions of health and safeguarding of employments in exceptionally injurious trades have been sought by a series of decrees under the law of 1863 relating to public health in such industries. Special regulations for safety of workers have been introduced in manufactures of white-lead, oxides of lead, chromate of lead, lucifer match works, rag and shoddy works; and for dangers common to many industries, provisions against dust, poisons, accidents and other risks to health or limb have been codified in a decree of 1896. A royal decree of 31 March 1903 prohibits employment of persons under 16 years in fur-pulling and in carotting of rabbit skins, and another of 13 May 1905 regulates use of lead in house-painting. In 1898 a law was passed to enable the authorities to deal with risks in quarries under the same procedure. Safety in mines (which are not private property, but state concessions to be worked under strict state control) has been provided for since 1810. In matters of hygiene, until 1899 the powers of the public health authorities to intervene were insufficient, and a law was passed authorizing the government to make regulations for every kind of risk in any undertaking, whether classed under the law of public health or not. By a special law of 1888 children and young persons under 18 years are excluded from employment as pedlars, hawkers or in circuses, except by their parents, and then only if they have attained 14 years.

Abuses of the truck system have, since 1887, been regulated with care. The chief objects of the law of 1887 were to secure payment in full to all workers, other than those in agriculture or domestic service, of wages in legal tender, to prohibit payment of wages in public-houses, and to secure prompt payment of wages. Certain deductions were permitted under careful control for specific customary objects: lodging, use of land, uniforms, food, firing. A royal order of the Loth of October 1903 required use of automatic indicators for estimating wages in certain cases in textile processes. The law of 15 June 1896 regulates the affixing in workplaces, where at least five workers are employed, of a notice of the working rules, the nature and rate of fines, if any, and the mode of their application. Two central services the mines inspectorate and the factory and workshop inspectorate, divide the duties above indicated. There is also a system of local administration of the regulations relating to industries classed as unhealthy, but the tendency has been to give the supreme control in these matters to the factory service, with its expert staff.

== The Netherlands ==
The first law for regulation of labour in manufacture was passed in 1874, and this related only to employment of children. The basis of all existing regulations was established in the law of 5 May 1889, which applies to all industrial undertakings, excluding agriculture and forestry, fishing, stock-rearing. Employment of children under 12 years is prohibited, and hours are limited for young persons under 16 and for women of any age. These protected persons may be excluded by royal decree from unhealthy industries, and such industries are specified in a decree of 1897 which supersedes other earlier regulations. Hours of employment must not exceed 11 in the 24, and at least one hour for rest must be given between 11 a.m. and 3 p.m., which hour must not be spent in a workroom. Work before 5 a.m. or after 7 p.m., Sunday work, and work on recognized holidays is generally prohibited, but there are exceptions. Overtime from 7 to P.M., under conditions, is allowed for women and young workers, and Sunday work for 'women, for example, in butter and cheese making, and night work for boys over 14 in certain industries. Employment of women within four weeks of childbirth is prohibited. Notices of working hours must be affixed in workplaces. Underground work in mines is prohibited for women and young persons under 16, but in the Netherlands mining is a very small industry.

In 1895 the first legislative provision was made for protection of workers against risk of accident or special injury to health. Sufficient cubic space, lighting, ventilation, sanitary accommodation, reasonable temperature, removal of noxious gases or dust, fencing of machinery, precautions against risk from fire and other matters are provided for. The manufacture of lucifer matches by means of white phosphorus was forbidden and the export, importation and sale was regulated by a law of 28 May 1901. By a regulation of 16 March 1904 provisions for safety and health of women and young workers were strengthened in processes where lead compounds or other poisons are used, and their employment at certain dangerous machines and in cleaning machinery or near driving belts was prohibited. No penal provision against truck exists in the Netherlands, but possibly abuses of the system are prevented by the existence of industrial councils representing both employers and workers, with powers to mediate or arbitrate in case of disputes.

== Switzerland ==
In Switzerland separate cantonal legislation prepared the way for the general Federal labour law of 1877 on which subsequent legislation rests. Such legislation is also cantonal as well as Federal, but in the latter there is only amplification or interpretation of the principles contained in the law of 1877, whereas cantonal legislation covers industries not included under the Federal law, e.g. single workers employed in a trade (métier) and employment in shops, offices and hotels. The Federal law is applied to factories, workshops employing young persons under 18 or more than 10 workers, and workshops in which unhealthy or dangerous processes are carried on. Mines are not included, but are regulated in some respects as regards health and safety by cantonal laws. Further, the Law of Employers' Liability 1881–1887, which requires in all industries precautions against accidents and reports of all serious. accidents to the cantonal governments, applies to mines.

This led, in 1896, to the creation of a special mining department, and mines, of which there are few, have to be inspected once a year by a mining engineer. The majority of the provisions of the Federal labour law apply to adult workers of both sexes, and the general limit of the II-hours' day, exclusive of at least one hour for meals, applies to men as well as women. The latter have, however, a legal claim, when they have a household to manage, to leave work at the dinner-hour half an hour earlier than the men. Men and unmarried women may be employed in such subsidiary work as cleaning before or after the general legal limits. On Saturdays and eves of the eight public holidays the 11-hours' day is reduced to 10. Sunday work and night work are forbidden, but exceptions are permitted conditionally. Night work is defined as 8 p.m. to 5 a.m. in summer, 8 p.m. to 6 a.m. in winter. Children are excluded from employment in workplaces, under the law until 14 years of age, and until 16 must attend continuation schools. Zurich canton has fixed the working day for women at 10 hours generally, and 9 hours on Saturdays and eves of holidays. Bale-Ville canton has the same limits and provides that the very limited Sunday employment permitted shall be compensated by double time off on another day. In the German-speaking cantons girls under 18 are not permitted to work overtime; in all cantons except Glarus the conditional overtime of 2 hours must be paid for at an enhanced wage.

Sanitary regulations and fencing of machinery are provided for with considerable minuteness in a Federal decree of 1897. The plans of every new factory must be submitted to the cantonal government. In the case of lucifer match factories, not only the building but methods of manufacture must be submitted. Since 1901 the manufacture, sale and import of matches containing white phosphorus have been forbidden. Women must be absent from employment during eight weeks before and after childbirth. In certain dangerous occupations, e.g. where lead or lead compounds are in use, women may not legally be employed during pregnancy. A resolution of the federal council in 1901 classed thirty-four different substances in use in industry as dangerous and laid down that in case of clearly defined illness of workers directly caused by use of any of these substances the liability provided by article 3 of the law of 25 June 1881, and article I of the law of 26 April 1887, should apply to the manufacture.

Legislative provision against abuses of the truck system appears to be of earlier origin in Switzerland (17th century) than any other European country outside England (15th century). The Federal Labour Law 1877 generally prohibits payment of wages otherwise than in current coin, and provides that no deduction shall be made without an express contract. Some of the cantonal laws go much farther than the British Truck Act 1896 (59 & 60 Vict. c. 44) in forbidding certain deductions; e.g. Zurich prohibits any charge for cleaning, warming or lighting workrooms or for hire of machinery. By the Federal law fines may not exceed half a day's wage. Administration of the Labour laws is divided between inspectors appointed by the Federal Government and local authorities, under supervision of the cantonal governments. The Federal Government forms a court of appeal against decisions of the cantonal governments.

According to a 1910 journal, the labor question “has never been an acute one in Switzerland, owing to the purely democratic spirit that pervades all ranks of society there.” Adding to this point, one report from 1893 on labor in Switzerland argued that

the labour question is still less acute in Switzerland than in other parts of the continent. The growth of large industries is limited by the democratic institutions of the country, by the comparatively equal standard of living maintained by different ranks of society, and by the equal social rights of all citizens. The accumulation of large fortunes in a few hands on the one side, and the increase of poverty on the other, is kept in check b the strict provisions of the Swiss Factory Act, which places considerable restrictions on the freedom of the employer. Indeed, so liberal has been the attitude of Federal Government towards the demands of the workmen that many complaints are made, and it is said that the stress of foreign competition will not admit of any further burdens being placed on home industry. The Swiss working classes, again, enjoy all the benefits of strong labour organisation ; they have their own press, are represented on all legislative bodies, and by means of the office known as the Workmen’s Secretary they can make their influence felt in the Federal Council itself.

One study has noted how political influences helped shape labour legislation in Switzerland, noting that

The welfare of the population was one of the objectives of the Federal Constitutions of 1848 and 1874, whose orientations were largely the work of the democratic radical party. The Factory Act and the Sickness and Accident Insurance Act were adopted when that party had an absolute majority. Considerable influence was also exerted by Christian social ethics, founded in the belief that all men, as children of God, have equal rights and that everyone has the right to human dignity.

== Germany ==
Regulation of the conditions of labour in industry throughout the German empire is provided for in the Imperial Industrial Code and the orders of the Federal Council-based thereon. By far the most important recent amendment socially is the law regulating child-labour, dated 30 March 1903, which relates to establishments having industrial character in the sense of the Industrial Code. This Code is based on earlier industrial codes of the separate states, but more especially on the Code of 1869 of the North German Confederation. It applies in whole or in part to all trades and industrial occupations, except transport, fisheries and agriculture. Mines are only included so far as truck, Sunday and holiday rest, prohibition of employment underground of female labour, limitation of the hours of women and young workers are concerned; otherwise the regulations for protection of life and limb of miners vary, as do the mining laws of the different states.

To estimate the force of the Industrial Code in working, it is necessary to bear in mind the complicated political history of the empire, the separate administration by the federated states, and the generally considerable powers vested in administration of initiating regulations. The Industrial Code expressly retains power for the states to initiate certain additions or exceptions to the Code which in any given state may form part of the law regulating factories there. The Code (unlike the Austrian Industrial Code) lays down no general limit for a normal working day for adult male workers, but since 1891 full powers were given to the Imperial government to limit hours for any classes of workers in industries where excessive length of the working day endangers the health of the worker (R.G.O. § 120e). Previously application had been made of powers to reduce the working day in such unhealthy industries as silvering of mirrors by mercury and the manufacture of white-lead. Separate states had, under mining laws, also limited hours of miners. Sunday rest was, in 1891, secured for every class of workers, commercial, industrial and mining. Annual holidays were also secured on church festivals. These provisions, however, are subject to exceptions under conditions.

An important distinction has to be shown when we turn to the regulations for hours and times of labour for protected persons (women, young persons and children). Setting aside for the moment hours of shop assistants (which are under special sections since 1900), it is to " factory workers " and not to industrial workers in general that these limits apply, although they may be, and in some instances have been, further extended – for instance, in ready-made clothing trades – by imperial decree to workshops, and by the Child Labour Law of 1903 regulation of the scope and duration of employment of children is much strengthened in workshops, commerce, transport and domestic industries. The term " factory " (Fabrik) is not defined in the Code, but it is clear from various decisions of the supreme court that it only in part coincides with the English term, and that some workplaces, where processes are carried on by aid of mechanical power, rank rather as English workshops. The distinction is rather between wholesale manufacturing industry, with subdivision of labour, and small industry, where the employer works himself. Certain classes of undertaking, viz. forges, timber-yards, dockyards, brickfields and open quarries, are specifically ranked as factories. Employment of protected persons at the surface of mines and underground quarries, and in salt works and ore-dressing works, and of boys underground comes under the factory regulations. These exclude children from employment under 13 years, and even later if an educational certificate has not been obtained; until 14 years hours of employment may not exceed 6 in the 24.

In processes and occupations under the scope of the Child Labour Law children may not be employed by their parents or guardians before Jo years of age or by other employers before 12 years of age; nor between the hours of 8 p.m. and 8 a.m., nor otherwise than in full compliance with requirements of educational authorities for school attendance and with due regard to prescribed pauses. In school term time the daily limit of employment for children is three hours, in holiday time three hours. As regards factories Germany, unlike Great Britain, France and Switzerland, requires a shorter day for young persons than for women – io hours for the former, t t hours for the latter. Women over 16 years may be employed i 1 hours. Night work is forbidden, i.e. work between 8:30 p.m. and 5.30 A.M. Overtime may be granted to meet unforeseen pressure or for work on perishable articles, under conditions, by local authorities and the higher administrative authorities. Prescribed meal-times are – an unbroken half-hour for children in their 6 hours; for young persons a midday pause of one hour, and half an hour respectively in the morning and afternoon spells; for women, an hour at midday, but women with the care of a household have the claim, on demand, to an extra halfhour, as in Switzerland. No woman may be employed within four weeks after childbirth, and unless a medical certificate can then be produced, the absence must extend to six weeks. Notice of working periods and meal-times must be affixed, and copies sent to the local authorities. Employment of protected persons in factory industries where there are special risks to health or morality may be forbidden or made dependent on special conditions. By the Child Labour Law employment of children is forbidden in brickworks, stone breaking, chimney sweeping, street cleaning and other processes and occupations. By an order of the Federal Council in 1902 female workers were excluded from main processes in forges and rolling mills.

All industrial employers alike are bound to organize labour in such a manner as to secure workers against injury to health and to ensure good conduct and propriety. Sufficient light, suitable cloakrooms and sanitary accommodation, and ventilation to carry off dust, vapours and other impurities are especially required. Dining rooms may be ordered by local authorities. Fencing and provision for safety in case of fire are required in detail. The work of the trade accident insurance associations in preventing accidents is especially recognized in provisions for special rules in dangerous or unhealthy industries. Officials of the state factory departments are bound to give opportunity to trustees of the trade associations to express an opinion on special rules. In a large number of industries the Federal Council has laid down special rules comparable with those for unhealthy occupations in Great Britain. Among the regulations most recently revised and strengthened are those for manufacture of lead colours and lead compounds, and for horse-hair and brushmaking factories.

The relations between the state inspectors of factories and the ordinary police authorities are regulated in each state by its constitution. Prohibitions of truck in its original sense – that is, payment of wages otherwise than in current coin – apply to any persons under a contract of service with an employer for a specified time for industrial purposes; members of a family working for a parent or husband are not included; outworkers are covered. Control of fines and deductions from wages applies only in factory industries and shops employing at least 20 workers. Shop hours are regulated by requiring shops to be closed generally between 9 p.m. and 5 a.m., by requiring a fixed midday rest of t 2 hours and at least 10 hours' rest in the 24 for assistants. These limits can be modified by administrative authority. Notice of hours and working rules must be affixed. During the hours of compulsory closing sale of goods on the streets or from house to house is forbidden. Under the Commercial Code, as under the Civil Code, every employer is bound to adopt every possible measure for maintaining the safety, health and good conduct of his employees. By an order of the Imperial Chancellor under the Commercial Code seats must be provided for commercial assistants and apprentices.

A 1910 journal commented positively on the gains that workers in Germany had attained by that time, including municipal employment offices, the building of model apartment houses, and co-operative movements that reduced living costs for working people engaged in them.

== Austria-Hungary ==
The Industrial Code of Austria, as of 1910, dates from 1883, differed from the Industrial Code of the Kingdom of Hungary. The latter is, owing to the predominantly agricultural character of the population, of later origin, and hardly had practical force before the law of 1893 provided for inspection and prevention of accidents in factories. No separate mining code existed in Hungary, and conditions of labour are regulated by the Austrian law of 1854. The truck system is repressed on lines similar to those in Austria and Germany.

The Austrian Code has its origin, however, like the British Factory Acts, in protection of child labour. Its present scope is determined by the Imperial "Patent" of 1859, and all industrial labour is included except mining, transport, fisheries, forestry, agriculture and domestic industries. Factories are defined as including industries in which a "manufacturing process is carried on in an enclosed place by the aid of not less than twenty workers working with machines, with subdivision of labour, and under an employer who does not himself manually assist in the work." In smaller handicraft industries the compulsory gild system of organization still applies. In every industrial establishment, large or small, the sanitary and safety provisions, general requirement of Sunday rest, and annual holidays (with conditional exceptions), prohibition of truck and limitation of the ages of child labour apply. Night work for women, 8 p.m. to 5 a.m., is prohibited only in factory industries; for young workers it is prohibited in any industry. Pauses in work are required in all industries; one hour at least must be given at midday, and if the morning and afternoon spells exceed 5 hours each, another half-hour's rest at least must be given. Children may not be employed in industrial work before 12 years, and then only 8 hours a day at work that is not injurious and if educational requirements are observed. The age of employment is raised to 14 for "factories," and the work must be such as will not hinder physical development. Women may not be employed in regular industrial occupation within one month after childbirth.

In certain scheduled unhealthy industries, where certificates of authorization from local authorities must be obtained by intending occupiers, conditions of health and safety for workers can be laid down in the certificate. The minister of the interior is empowered to draw up regulations prohibiting or making conditions for the employment of young workers or women in dangerous or unhealthy industries. The provisions against truck cover not only all industrial workers engaged in manual labour under a contract with an employer, but also shop assistants; the special regulations against fines and deductions apply to factory workers and shops where at least 20 workers are employed. In mines under the law of 1884, which supplements the general mining law, employment of women and girls underground is prohibited; boys from 12 to 16 and girls from 12 to 18 may only be employed at light work above ground; 14 is the earliest age of admission for boys underground. The shifts from bank to bank must not exceed 12 hours, of which not more than to may be effective work. Sunday rest must begin not later than 6 a.m., and must be of 24 hours' duration. These last two provisions do not hold in case of pressing danger for safety, health or property. Sick and accident funds and mining associations are legislated for in minutest detail. The general law provides for safety in working, but special rules drawn up by the district authorities lay down in detail the conditions of health and safety. As regards manufacturing industry, the Industrial Code lays no obligation on employers to report accidents, and until the Accident Insurance Law of 1889 came into force no statistics were available. In Austria, unlike Germany, the factory inspectorate is organized throughout under a central chief inspector.

== Scandinavian countries ==
In Sweden the Factory Law was amended in January 1901; in Denmark in July 1901. Until that year, however, Norway was in some respects in advance of the other two countries by its law of 1892, which applied to industrial works, including metal works of all kinds and mining. Women were thereby prohibited from employment:

(a) underground;
(b) in cleaning or oiling machinery in motion;
(c) during six weeks after childbirth, unless provided with a medical certificate stating that they might return at the end of four weeks without injury to health;
(d) in dangerous, unhealthy or exhausting trades during pregnancy.

Further, work on Sundays and public holidays is prohibited to all workers, adult and youthful, with conditional exceptions under the authority of the inspectors. Children over 12 are admitted to industrial work on obtaining certificates of birth, of physical fitness and of elementary education. The hours of children are limited to six, with pauses, and of young persons (of 14 to 18 years) to 10, with pauses. Night work between 8 p.m. and 6 a.m. is prohibited. All workers are entitled to a copy of a code of factory rules containing the terms of the contract of work drawn up by representatives of employees with the employers and sanctioned by the inspector. Health and safety in working are provided for in detail in the same law of 1892. Special rules may be made for dangerous trades, and in 1899 such rules were established for match factories, similar to some of the British rules, but notably providing for a dental examination four times yearly by a doctor.

In Denmark, regulation began with unhealthy industries, and it was not until the law of 1901 came into force, on 1 January 1902, that children under 12 years have been excluded from factory labour. Control of child labour can be strengthened by municipal regulation, and this has been done in Copenhagen by an order of 23 May 1903. In Sweden the 12 years' limit had for some time held in the larger factories; the scope has been extended so that it corresponds with the Norwegian law. The hours of children are, in Denmark, 62 for those under 14 years; in Sweden six for those under 13 years. Young persons may not in either country work more than 10 hours daily, and night work, which is forbidden for persons under 18 years, is now defined as in Norway. Women may not be employed in industry within four weeks of childbirth, except on authority of a medical certificate. All factories in Sweden where young workers are employed are subject to medical inspection once a year. Fencing of machinery and hygienic conditions (ventilation, cubic space, temperature, light) are regulated in detail. In Denmark the use of white phosphorus in manufacture of lucifer matches has been prohibited since 1874, and special regulations have been drawn up by administrative orders which strengthen control of various unhealthy or dangerous industries, dry-cleaning works, printing works and type foundries, iron foundries and engineering works. A special act of 6 April 1906 regulates labour and sanitary conditions in bakehouses and confectionery works.

A 1910 journal commented on the progress made in labor rights in Denmark and Norway by that time. In regards to Denmark, attention was drawn to the success of trade unions in having hours reduced and wages increased in nearly all industries, together with old-age pensions and better factory conditions. In regards to Norway, the journal noted that in that country

the industrial and political labor movements are one. Labor laws are fair. There is workingmen’s compensation and state insurance. Women may not work in mines or at machines. Chistiana lends workmen money to build homes of their own.

== Italy and Spain ==
The wide difference between the industrial development of these southern Latin countries and the two countries with which this summary begins, and the far greater importance of the agricultural interests, produced a situation, as regards labour legislation until as recently as 1903, which makes it convenient to touch on the comparatively limited scope of their regulations at the close of the series. It was stated by competent and impartial observers from each of the two countries, at the International Congress on Labour Laws held at Brussels in 1897, that the lack of adequate measures for protection of child labour and inefficient administration of such regulations as exist was then responsible for abuse of their forces that could be found in no other European countries. "Their labour in factories, workshops, and mines constitutes a veritable martyrdom" (Spain). "I believe that there is no country where a sacrifice of child life is made that is comparable with that in certain Italian factories and industries" (Italy). In both countries important progress has since been made in organizing inspection and preventing accidents. In Spain the first step in the direction of limitation of women's hours of labour was taken by a law of 1900, which took effect in 1902, in regulations for reduction of hours of labour for adults to II, normally, in the 24. Hours of children under 14 must not exceed six in any industrial work nor eight in any commercial undertaking. Labour before the age of 10 years and night work between 6 p.m. and 5 a.m. was prohibited, and powers were taken to extend the prohibition of night work to young persons under 16 years. The labour of children in Italy was until 1902 regulated in the main by a law of 1886, but a royal decree of 1899 strengthened it by classing night work for children under 12 years as " injurious," such work being thereby generally prohibited for them, though exceptions are admitted; at the same time it was laid down that children from 12 to 15 years might not be employed for more than six hours at night.

The law of 1886 prohibits employment of children under nine years in industry and under To years in underground mining. Night work for women was in Italy first prohibited by the law of 19 June 1902, and at the same time also for boys under 15, but this regulation was not to take full effect for 5 years as regards persons already so employed; by the same law persons under 15 and women of any age were accorded the claim to one day's complete rest of 24 hours in the week; the age of employment of children in factories, workshops, laboratories, quarries, mines, was raised to 12 years generally and 14 years for underground work; the labour of female workers of any age was prohibited in underground work, and power was reserved to further restrict and regulate their employment as well as that of male workers under 15. Spain and Italy, the former by the law of 13 March 1900, the latter by the law of 19 June 1902, prohibit the employment of women within a fixed period of childbirth; in Spain the limit is three weeks, in Italy one month, which may be reduced to three weeks on a medical certificate of fitness. Sunday rest is secured in industrial works, with regulated exceptions in Spain by the law of 3 March 1904. It is in the direction of fencing and other safeguards against accidents and as regards sanitary provisions, both in industrial workplaces and in mines, that Italy has made most advance since her law of 1890 for prevention of accidents. Special measures for prevention of malaria are required in cultivation of rice by a ministerial circular of 23 April 1903; work may not begin until an hour after sunrise and must cease an hour before sunset; children under 13 may not be employed in this industry.

== United States ==
Under the general head of Labour Legislation all American statute laws regulating labour, its conditions, and the relation of employer and employee must be classed. It includes what is properly known as factory legislation. Labour legislation belongs to the latter half of the 19th century, so far as the United States is concerned. Like England in the far past, the Americans in colonial days undertook to regulate wages and prices, and later the employment of apprentices. Legislation relating to wages and prices was long ago abandoned, but the laws affecting the employment of apprentices still exist in some form, although conditions of employment have changed so materially that apprenticeships are not entered as of old; but the laws regulating the employment of apprentices were the basis on which English legislation found a foothold when parliament wished to regulate the labour of factory operatives. The code of labour laws of the present time is almost entirely the result of the industrial revolution during the latter part of the 18th century, under which the domestic or hand-labour system was displaced through the introduction of power machinery. As this revolution took place in the United States at a somewhat later date than in England, the labour legislation necessitated by it belongs to a later date. The factory, so far as textiles are concerned, was firmly established in America during the period from 1820 to 1840, and it was natural that the English legislation found friends and advocates in the United States, although the more objectionable conditions accompanying the English factory were not to be found there.

The first attempt to secure legislation regulating factory employment related to the hours of labour, which were very long – from twelve to thirteen hours a day. Early during the introduction of machinery, it was felt that the tension resulting from speeded machines and the close attention required in the factory ought to be accompanied by a shorter work day. This view took firm hold of the operatives and was the chief cause of the agitation which has resulted in a great body of laws applying in very many directions. As early as 1806 the caulkers and shipbuilders of New York City agitated for a reduction of hours to ten per day, but no legislation followed. There were several other attempts to secure some regulation relative to hours, but there was no general agitation prior to 1831. As Massachusetts was the state which first recognized the necessity of regulating employment (following in a measure, and so far as conditions demanded, the English labour or factory legislation), the history of such legislation in that state is indicative of that in the United States, and as it would be impossible in this article to give a detailed history of the origin of laws in the different states, the dates of their enactment, and their provisions, it is best to follow primarily the course of the Eastern states, and especially that of Massachusetts, where the first general agitation took place and the first laws were enacted. That state in 1836 regulated by law the question of the education of young persons employed in manufacturing establishments. The regulation of hours of labour was warmly discussed in 1832, and several legislative committees and commissions reported upon it, but no specific action on the general question of hours of labour secured the indorsement of the Massachusetts legislature until 1874, although the day's labour of children under twelve years of age was limited to ten hours in 1842. Ten hours constituted a day's labour, on a voluntary basis, in many trades in Massachusetts and other parts of the country as early as 1853, while in the shipbuilding trades this was the work-day in 1844. In April 1840 President Van Buren issued an order "that all public establishments will hereafter be regulated, as to working hours, by the ten-hours system." The real aggressive movement began in 1845, through numerous petitions to the Massachusetts legislature urging a reduction of the day's labour to eleven hours, but nothing came of these petitions at that time. Again, in 1850, a similar effort was made, and also in 1851 and 1852, but the bills failed. Then there was a period of quiet until 1865, when an unpaid commission made a report relative to the hours of labour, and recommended the establishment of a bureau of statistics for the purpose of collecting data bearing upon the labour question. This was the first step in this direction in any country. The first bureau of the kind was established in Massachusetts in 1869, but meanwhile, in accordance with reports of commissions and the address of Governor Bullock in 1866, and the general sentiment which then prevailed, the legislature passed an act regulating in a measure the conditions of the employment of children in manufacturing establishments; and this is one of the first laws of the kind in the United States, although the first legislation in the United States relating to the hours of labour which the writer has been able to find, and for which he can fix a date, was enacted by the state of Pennsylvania in 1849, the law providing that ten hours should be a day's work in cotton, woollen, paper, bagging, silk and flax factories.

The Massachusetts law of 1866 provided, firstly, that no child under ten should be employed in any manufacturing establishment, and that no child between ten and fourteen should be so employed unless he had attended some public or private school at least six months during the year preceding such employment, and, further, that such employment should not continue unless the child attended school at least six months in each and every year; secondly, a penalty not exceeding $50 for every owner or agent or other person knowingly employing a child in violation of the act; thirdly, that no child under the age of fourteen should be employed in any manufacturing establishment more than eight hours in any one day; fourthly, that any parent or guardian allowing or consenting to employment in violation of the act should forfeit a sum not to exceed $50 for each offence; fifthly, that the governor instruct the state constable and his deputies to enforce the provisions of all laws for regulating the employment of children in manufacturing establishments. The same legislature also created a commission of three persons, whose duty it was to investigate the subject of hours of labour in relation to the social, educational and sanitary condition of the working classes. In 1867 a fundamental law relating to schooling and hours of labour of children employed in manufacturing and mechanical establishments was passed by the Massachusetts legislature. It differed from the act of the year previous in some respects, going deeper into the general question. It provided that no child under ten should be employed in any manufacturing or mechanical establishment of the commonwealth, and that no child between ten and fifteen should be so employed unless he had attended school, public or private, at least three months during the year next preceding his employment. There were provisions relating to residence, etc., and a further provision that no time less than 120 half-days of actual schooling should be deemed an equivalent of three months, and that no child under fifteen should be employed in any manufacturing or mechanical establishment more than sixty hours any one week. The law also provided penalties for violation. It repealed the act of 1866.

In 1869 began the establishment of that chain of offices in the United States, the principle of which has been adopted by other countries, known as bureaus of statistics of labour, their especial purpose being the collection and dissemination of information relating to all features of industrial employment. As a result of the success of the first bureau, bureaus are in existence in thirty-three states, in addition to the United States Bureau of Labour.

A special piece of legislation which belongs to the commonwealth of Massachusetts, so far as experience shows, was that in 1872, providing for cheap morning and evening trains for the accommodation of working men living in the vicinity of Boston. Great Britain had long had such trains, which were called parliamentary trains. Under the Massachusetts law some of the railways running out of Boston furnished the accommodation required, and the system has since been in operation.

In different parts of the country the agitation to secure legislation regulating the hours of labour became aggressive again in 1870 and the years immediately following, there being a constant repetition of attempts to secure the Factory enactment of a ten-hours law, but in Massachusetts legislation all the petitions failed till 1874, when the legislature of that commonwealth established the hours of labour at sixty per week not only for children under eighteen, but for women, the law providing that no minor under eighteen and no woman over that age should be employed by any person, firm or corporation in any manufacturing establishment more than ten hours in any one day. In 1876 Massachusetts reconstructed its laws relating to the employment of children, although it did not abrogate the principles involved in earlier legislation, while in 1877 the commonwealth passed Factory Acts covering the general provisions of the British laws. It provided for the general inspection of factories and public buildings, the provisions of the law relating to dangerous machinery, such as belting, shafting, gearing, drums, &c., which the legislature insisted must be securely guarded, and that no machinery other than steam engines should be cleaned while running. The question of ventilation and cleanliness was also attended to. Dangers connected with hoistways, elevators and well-holes were minimized by their protection by sufficient trap-doors, while fire-escapes were made obligatory on all establishments of three or more storeys in height. All main doors, both inside and outside, of manufacturing establishments, as well as those of churches, school-rooms, town halls, theatres and every building used for public assemblies, should open outwardly whenever the factory inspectors of the commonwealth deemed it necessary. These provisions remain in the laws of Massachusetts, and other states have found it wise to follow them.

The labour legislation in force in 1910 in the various states of the Union might be classified in two general branches: (A) protective labour legislation, or laws for the aid of workers who, on account of their economic dependence, are not in a position fully to protect themselves; (B) legislation having for its purpose the fixing of the legal status of the worker as an employee, such as laws relating to the making and breaking of the labour contract, the right to form organizations and to assemble peaceably, the settlement of labour disputes, the licensing of occupations, &c.

(A) The first class includes factory and workshop acts, laws relating to hours of labour, work on Sundays and holidays, the payment of wages, the liability of employers for injuries to their employees, &c. Factory acts have been passed by Factory nearly all the states of the Union. These may be and work- considered in two groups – first, laws which relate to conditions of employment and affect only children, young persons and women; and second, laws which relate to the sanitary condition of factories and workshops and to the safety of employees generally. The states adopting such laws have usually made provision for factory inspectors, whose duties are to enforce these laws and who have power to enter and inspect factories and workshops. The most common provisions of the factory acts in the various states are those which fix an age limit below which employment is unlawful. All but five states have enacted such provisions, and these five states have practically no manufacturing industries. In some states the laws fixing an age limit are restricted in their application to factories, while in others they extend also to workshops, bakeries, mercantile establishments and other work places where children are employed. The prescribed age limit varies from ten to fourteen years. Provisions concerning the education of children in factories and workshops may be considered in two groups, those relating to apprenticeship and those requiring a certain educational qualification as a prerequisite to employment. Apprenticeship laws are numerous, but they do not now have great force, because of the practical abrogation of the apprenticeship system through the operation of modern methods of production. Most states have provisions prohibiting illiterates under a specified age, usually sixteen, from being employed in factories and workshops. The provisions of the factory acts relating to hours of labour and night work generally affect only the employment of women and young persons. Most of the states have enacted such provisions, those limiting the hours of children occurring more frequently than those limiting the hours of women. The hour limit for work in such cases ranges from six per day to sixty-six per week. Where the working time of children is restricted, the minimum age prescribed for such children ranges from twelve to twenty-one years. In some cases the restriction of the hours of labour of women and children is general, while in others it applies only to employment in one or more classes of industries. Other provisions of law for the protection of women and children, but not usually confined in their operation to factories and workshops, are such as require seats for females and separate toilet facilities for the sexes, and prohibit employment in certain occupations as in mines, places where intoxicants are manufactured or sold, in cleaning or operating dangerous machinery, &c. Provisions of factory acts relating to the sanitary condition of factories and workshops and the safety of employees have been enacted in nearly all the manufacturing states of the Union. They prohibit overcrowding, and require proper ventilation, sufficient light and heat, the lime-washing or painting of walls and ceilings, the provision of exhaust fans and blowers in places where dust or dangerous fumes are generated, guards on machinery, mechanical belts and gearing shifters, guards on elevators and hoistways, hand-rails on stairs, fire-escapes, &c.

The statutes relating to hours of labour may be considered under five groups, namely: (1) general laws which merely fix what shall be regarded as a day's labour in the absence of a contract; (2) laws defining what shall constitute a day's work on public roads; (3) laws limiting the hours of labour per day on public works; (4) laws limiting the hours of labour in certain occupations; and (5) laws which specify the hours per day or per week during which women and children may be employed. The statutes included in the first two groups place no restrictions upon the number of hours which may be agreed upon between employers and employees, while those in the other three groups usually limit the freedom of contract and provide penalties for their violation. A considerable number of states have enacted laws which fix a day's labour in the absence of any contract, some at eight and others at ten hours, so that when an employer and an employee make a contract and they do not specify what shall constitute a day's labour, eight or ten hours respectively would be ruled as the day's labour in an action which might come before the courts. In a number of the states it is optional with the citizens to liquidate certain taxes either by cash payments or by rendering personal service. In the latter case the length of the working day is defined by law, eight hours being usually specified. The Federal government and nearly one-half of the states have laws providing that eight hours shall constitute a day's work for employees on public works. Under the Federal Act it is unlawful for any officer of the government or of any contractor or subcontractor for public works to permit labourers and mechanics to work longer than eight hours per day. The state laws concerning hours of labour have similar provisions. Exceptions are provided for cases of extraordinary emergencies, such as danger to human life or property. In many states the hours of labour have been limited by law in occupations in which, on account of their dangerous or insanitary character, the health of the employees would be jeopardized by long hours of labour, or in which the fatigue occasioned by long hours would endanger the lives of the employees or of the public. The occupations for which such special legislation has been enacted are those of employees on steam and street railways, in mines and other underground workings, smelting and refining works, bakeries and cotton and woollen mills. Laws limiting the hours of labour of women and children have been considered under factory and workshop acts.

Nearly all states and Territories of the Union have laws prohibiting the employment of labour on Sunday. These laws usually make it a misdemeanour for persons either to labour themselves or to compel or permit their apprentices, servants or other employees, to labour on the first day of the week. Exceptions are made in the case of household duties or works of necessity or charity, and in the case of members of religious societies who observe some other than the first day of the week.

Statutes concerning the payment of wages of employees may be considered in two groups: (i) those which relate to the employment contract, such as laws fixing the maximum period of wage payments, prohibiting the payment of wages in scrip or other evidences of indebtedness in lieu of lawful money, prohibiting wage deductions on account of fines, breakage of machinery, discounts for prepayments, medical attendance, relief funds or other purposes, requiring the giving of notice of reduction of wages, &c.; (2) legislation granting certain privileges or affording special protection to working people with respect to their wages, such as laws exempting wages from attachment, preferring wage claims in assignments, and granting workmen liens upon buildings and other constructions on which they have been employed.

Employers' liability laws have been passed to enable an employee to recover damages from his employer under certain conditions when he has been injured through accident occurring in the works of the employer. The common-law maxim that the principal is responsible for the acts of his agent does not liability. apply where two or more persons are working together under the same employer and one of the employees is injured through the carelessness of his fellow-employee, although the one causing the accident is the agent of the principal, who under the common law would be responsible. The old Roman law and the English and American practice under it held that the co-employee was a party to the accident. The injustice of this rule is seen by a single illustration. A weaver in a cotton factory, where there are hundreds of operatives, is injured by the neglect or carelessness of the engineer in charge of the motive power. Under the common law the weaver could not recover damages from the employer, because he was the co-employee of the engineer. So, one of thousands of employees of a railway system, sustaining injuries through the carelessness of a switchman whom he never saw, could recover no damages from the railway company, both being co-employees of the same employer. The injustice of this application of the common-law rule has been recognized, but the only way to avoid the difficulty was through specific legislation providing that under such conditions as those related, and similar ones, the doctrine of co-employment should not apply, and that the workman should have the same right to recover damages as a passenger upon a railway train. This legislation has upset some of the most notable distinctions of law.

The first agitation for legislation of this character occurred in England in 1880. A number of states in the Union have now enacted statutes fixing the liability of employers under certain conditions and relieving the employee from the application of the common-law rule. Where the employee himself is contributory to the injuries resulting from an accident he cannot recover, nor can he recover in some cases where he knows of the danger from the defects of tools or implements employed by him. The legislation upon the subject involves many features of legislation which need not be described here, such as those concerning the power of employees to make a contract, and those defining the conditions, often elaborate, which lead to the liability of the employer and the duties of the employee, and the relations in which damages for injuries sustained in employment may be recovered from the employer.

(B) The statutes thus far considered may be regarded as protective labour legislation. There is, besides, a large body of statutory laws enacted in the various states for the purpose of fixing the legal status of employers and employees and defining their rights and privileges as such.

A great variety of statutes have been enacted in the various states relating to the labour contract. Among these are laws defining the labour contract, requiring notice of termination of contract, making it a misdemeanour to break a contract of service and thereby endanger human life or expose valuable property to serious injury, or to make a contract of service and accept transportation or pecuniary advancements with intent to defraud, prohibiting contracts of employment whereby employees waive the right to damages in case of injury, &c. A Federal statute makes it a misdemeanour for any one to prepay the transportation or in any way assist or encourage the importation of aliens under contract to perform labour or service of any kind in the United States, exceptions being made in the case of skilled labour that cannot otherwise be obtained, domestic servants and persons belonging to any of the recognized professions.

The Federal government and nearly all the states and territories have statutory provisions requiring the examination and licensing of persons practising certain trades other than those in the class of recognized professions. The Federal statute relates only to engineers on steam vessels, masters, mates, pilots, &c. The occupations for which examinations and licences are required by the various state laws are those of barbers, horseshoers, elevator operators, plumbers, stationary firemen, steam engineers, telegraph operators on railroads and certain classes of mine workers and steam and street railway employees.

The right of combination and peaceable assembly on the part of employees is recognized at common law throughout the United States. Organizations of working-men formed for their mutual benefit, protection and improvement, such for endeavouring to secure higher wages, as g g g shorter hours of labour or better working conditions, are nowhere regarded as unlawful. A number of states and the Federal government have enacted statutes providing for the incorporation of trade unions, but owing to the freedom from regulation or inspection enjoyed by unincorporated trade unions, very few have availed themselves of this privilege. A number of states have enacted laws tending to give special protection to and encourage trade unions. Thus, nearly one-half of the states have passed acts declaring it unlawful for employers to discharge workmen for joining labour organizations, or to make it a condition of employment that they shall not belong to such bodies. Laws of this kind have generally been held to be unconstitutional. Nearly all the states have laws protecting trade unions in the use of the union label, insignia of membership, credentials, &c., and making it a misdemeanour to counterfeit or fraudulently use them. A number of the states exempt labour organizations from the operations of the anti-trust and insurance acts.

Until recent years all legal action concerning labour disturbances was based upon the principles of the common law.

Some of the states have now fairly complete statutory enactments concerning labour disturbances, while g others have little or no legislation of this class. The right of employees to strike for any cause or for no cause is sustained by the common law everywhere in the United States. Likewise an employer has a right to discharge any or all of his employees when they have no contract with him, and he may refuse to employ any person or class of persons for any reason or for no reason. Agreements among strikers to take peaceable means to induce others to remain away from the works of an employer until he yields to the demands of the strikers are not held to be conspiracies under the common law, and the carrying out of such a purpose by peaceable persuasion and without violence, intimidation or threats, is not unlawful. However, any interference with the constitutional rights of another to employ whom he chooses or to labour when, where or on what terms he pleases, is illegal. The boycott has been held to be an illegal conspiracy in restraint of trade. The statutory enactments of the various states concerning labour disturbances are in part re-enactments of the rules of common law and in part more or less departures from or additions to the established principles. The list of such statutory enactments is a large one, and includes laws relating to blacklisting, boycotting, conspiracy against working-men, interference with employment, intimidation, picketing and strikes of railway employees; laws requiring statements of causes of discharge of employees and notice of strikes in advertisements for labour; laws prohibiting deception in the employment of labour and the hiring of armed guards by employers; and laws declaring that certain labour agreements do not constitute conspiracy. Some of these laws have been held to be unconstitutional, and some have not yet been tested in the courts.

The laws just treated relate almost entirely to acts either of employers or of employees, but there is another form of law, namely, – that providing for action to be taken by others in the effort to prevent working people from losing employment, either by their own acts or by those of their employers, or to settle any differences which arise out of controversies relating to wages, hours of labour, terms and conditions of employment, rules, &c. These laws provide for the mediation and the arbitration of labour disputes (see Compulsory arbitration and Conciliation). Twenty-three states and the Federal government have laws or constitutional provisions of this nature. In some cases they provide for the appointment of state boards, and in others of local boards only. A number of states provide for local or special boards in addition to the regular state boards. In some states it is required that a member of a labour organization must be a member of the board, and, in general, both employers and employees must be represented. Nearly all state boards are required to attempt to mediate between the parties to a dispute when information is received of an actual or threatened labour trouble. Arbitration may be undertaken in some states on application from either party, in others on the application of both parties. An agreement to maintain the status quo pending arbitration is usually required. The modes of enforcement of obedience to the awards of the boards are various. Some states depend on publicity alone, some give the decisions the effect of judgments of courts of law which may be enforced by execution, while in other states disobedience to such decisions is punishable as for contempt of court. The Federal statute applies only to common carriers engaged in interstate commerce, and provides for an attempt to be made at mediation by two designated government officials in controversies between common carriers and their employees, and, in case of the failure of such an attempt, for the formation of a board of arbitration consisting of the same officials together with certain other parties to be selected. Such arbitration boards are to be formed only at the request or upon the consent of both parties to the controversy.

The enforcement of laws by executive or judicial action is an important matter relating to labour legislation, for without action such laws would remain dead letters. Under the constitutions of the states, the governor is the commander-in-chief of the military forces, and he has the power to order the militia or any part of it into active service in case of insurrection, invasion, tumult, riots or breaches of the peace or imminent danger thereof. Frequent action has been taken in the case of strikes with the view of preventing or suppressing violence threatened or happening to persons or property, the effect being, however, that the militia protects those working or desiring to work, or the employers. The president of the United States may use the land and naval forces whenever by reason of insurrection, domestic violence, unlawful obstructions, conspiracy, combinations or assemblages of persons it becomes impracticable to enforce the laws of the land by the ordinary course of judicial proceedings, or when the execution of the laws is so hindered by reason of such events that any portion or class of the people are deprived thereby of their rights and privileges under the constitution and laws of the country. Under this general power the United States forces have been used for the protection of both employers and employees indirectly, the purpose being to protect mails and, as in the states, to see that the laws are carried out.

The power of the courts to interfere in labour disputes is through the injunction and punishment thereunder for contempt of court. It is a principle of law that when there are interferences, actual or threatened, with property or with rights of a pecuniary nature, and the common or statute law offers no adequate and immediate remedy for the prevention of injury, a court of equity may interpose and issue its order or injunction as to what must or must not be done, a violation of which writ gives the court which issued it the power to punish for contempt. The doctrine is that something is necessary to be done to stop at once the destruction of property and the obstruction of business, and the injunction is immediate in its action. This writ has been resorted to frequently for the indirect protection of employees and of employers.

== See also ==
- Labour law
