= Factory and Workshop Act 1878 =

Act of the Parliament of the United Kingdom

Factory and Workshop Act 1878 (Note: Section 1.)
- Act of Parliament
- Parliament of the United Kingdom
- Long title: An Act to consolidate and amend the Law relating to Factories and Workshops.
- Citation: 41 & 42 Vict. c. 16
- Introduced by: R. A. Cross MP (Commons)
- Territorial extent: United Kingdom

Dates
- Royal assent: 27 May 1878
- Commencement: 1 January 1879 (Note: Section 2.)
- Repealed: 1 January 1902
Other legislation
Amends	See § Repealed enactments
Repeals/revokes	See § Repealed enactments
Amended by	Factory and Workshop Act 1883; Summary Jurisdiction Act 1884; Shop Hours Regulation Act 1886; Factory and Workshop Amendment (Scotland) Act 1888; Cotton Cloth Factories Act 1889; Factory and Workshop Act 1891; Factory and Workshop Act 1895
Repealed by	Factory and Workshop Act 1901
Relates to	Health and Morals of Apprentices Act 1802; Labour of Children, etc., in Factories Act 1833; Factory Act 1844; Ropeworks Act 1846; Factory Act 1850; Factory Act 1853; Factory Act 1856; Lace Factory Act 1861; Bakehouse Regulation Act 1863; Factory Acts Extension Act 1864; Factory Acts Extension Act 1867; Workshop Regulation Act 1867; Factory and Workshop Act 1870; Factory and Workshop (Jews) Act 1871; Factory and Workshop Act 1871; Factory Act 1874

Status: Repealed

History of passage through Parliament

Records of Parliamentary debate relating to the statute from Hansard

Text of statute as originally enacted

The Factory and Workshop Act 1878 (41 & 42 Vict. c. 16) was an act of the Parliament of the United Kingdom that consolidated enactments relating to factories and workshops in the United Kingdom.

== Background ==
In the debates on Mundella's bills and the Factory Act 1874 (37 & 38 Vict. c. 44), it had been noted that years of piece-meal legislation had left factory law in an unsatisfactory and confusing state; (Note: According to the then Chief Inspector of Factories the more recent Acts "were necessarily incomplete and experimental ... by the time the last of these several Acts had received the Royal assent there existed a perfect chaos of regulations – all good in themselves when enacted – all having a direct purpose, which most of the trades have outlived, and which required constant care and consideration to prevent an application of them which would have imperilled that impartiality and that uniformity of administration which are absolutely essential to secure harmonious and cheerful co-operation". The lace manufacturers of Nottingham told the 1875 royal commission that workers in the industry fell under one (or none) of three different acts; all branches customarily worked a 54-hour week but most workers – where the Factory Act 1874 did not apply – preferred to breakfast before starting work: a work pattern incompatible with the act.) the government had spoken of the need to consolidate and extend factory law by a single act replacing all previous legislation, but had not felt itself able to allocate the necessary legislative time. In March 1875, a royal commission (headed by Sir James Fergusson) was set up to look at the consolidation and extension of factory law. It took evidence in the principal industrial towns, and published its report in March 1876. It recommended consolidation of legislation by a single new act. The new act should include workplaces in the open air, and carrying, washing and cleaning; however mines and agriculture should be excluded. Work by protected persons should be within a twelve-hour window (between 6am and 7pm: exceptionally for some industries the window could be 8am to 8pm). Within that window: in factories two hours should be allowed for meals and no work session should exceed four and a half hours; in workshops work sessions should not exceed five hours and meal breaks should total at least one and a half hours. Sunday working should be permitted where both worker and employer were Jewish. All children should attend school from five until fourteen; they should not be allowed to attend half-time, nor be employed under the new act, until ten. From ten to fourteen employment would be conditional upon satisfactory school attendance and educational achievement.

The government announced that the report had been produced too late for legislation in the current parliamentary session, but legislation would be introduced in the following one.

== Passage ==
The Factories and Workshops Law Consolidation Bill had its a first reading in April 1877, but made no further progress; (Note: Irish members were making their presence felt by obstructing progress with legislation across the board: the Canal Boats Act 1877 (40 & 41 Vict. c. 60) was, however, passed. This addressed a recommendation of the Factory and Workshop Commission, which had taken evidence on the living conditions of barge children, but the act led to the registration and regulation of canal boats as residences, rather than as workplaces.) at the end of July it was postponed to the following year.

In 1878, the bill was given a higher priority. Leave to bring in the Factories and Workshops Bill to the House of Commons was granted to the Home Secretary, R. A. Cross MP, and Sir Henry Selwin-Ibbetson MP on 19 January 1878, as soon as Parliament convened. The bill had its first reading in the House of Commons on X, presented by Home Secretary, R. A. Cross MP. The bill had its second reading in the House of Commons on 11 February 1878, introduced by R. A. Cross, and was committed to a committee of the whole house, which met on 21 February 1878, 25 February 1878, 28 February 1878, 1 March 1878, 7 March 1878, and reported on 7 March 1878, with amendments. The amended bill was considered on 22 March 1878, with amendments. The amended bill had its third reading in the House of Commons on 29 March 1878 and passed, without amendments.

The bill had its first reading in the House of Lords on 1 April 1878. The bill had its second reading in the House of Lords on 9 April 1878 and was committed to a committee of the whole house, which met and reported on 12 April 1878, with amendments. The amended bill had its third reading in the House of Lords on 16 May 1878 and passed, with amendments.

The amended bill was considered and agreed to by the House of Commons on 21 May 1878.

The bill was granted royal assent on 27 May 1878.

== Provisions ==
The act replaced all previous acts (it listed sixteen acts repealed in their entirety) by a single act of some hundred and seven clauses. The Chief Inspector of Factories described it as much less restrictive than the legislation it replaced: "The hard and fast line [drawn by the previous acts] is now an undulating and elastic one, drawn to satisfy the absolute necessities and customs of different trades in different parts of the kingdom."

The protected persons fell into three categories:

- 'Children' (aged 10–14, but a child of 13 who had met required levels of academic attainment and had a good school attendance record could be employed as a 'young person')
- 'Young persons' (aged 14–18, of either sex: as noted above 13-year-olds satisfying educational requirements could be employed as young persons)
- 'Women' (females aged over 18; it had been urged that women did not require protection, and their inclusion in factory legislation deterred their employment. The countering arguments (that married women required protection from husbands, and unless unmarried women were subject to the same protection, Parliament would be legislating to promote immorality; and that the restrictions were in the interests of public health, since they ensured some maternal attention for the children of working women) had generally prevailed.)

The premises being regulated were now separated into five categories: Factories fell into two types;

- 'textile factories' – those within the scope of the Factory Act 1874 (37 & 38 Vict. c. 44)
- 'non-textile factories' – workplaces carrying out a number of specified processes ((textile) print works, bleaching and dyeing works, earthenware works (excluding brickworks), lucifer match works, percussion cap works, cartridge works, paper staining works, fustian cutting works, blast furnaces, copper mills, iron mills, foundries, metal and india-rubber works, paper mills, glass works, tobacco factories, letterpress printing works, bookbinding works) and additionally any workplace in which mechanical power was used (replacing the former distinction between factory and workshop on the basis on the number of employees)

Workshops were places in which the manufacture, repair or finishing of articles were carried out as a trade without the use of mechanical power and to which the employer controlled access (it was irrelevant whether these operations were carried out in the open air, and shipyards, quarries and pit banks were specifically scheduled as workshops, unless factories because mechanical power was used). Laundries (originally in the bill) were excluded from the final act; in Ireland much laundry work was carried out in convents and Irish members objected to inspection of convents by an (allegedly) exclusively Protestant inspectorate. (Note: The Home Secretary assured the Commons that religion was not a consideration when appointing to the inspectorate; upon inquiry he found that the inspector for Manchester was a Catholic.) Three types of workshop were distinguished:

- Workshops
- Workshops not employing protected persons other than women
- Domestic workshops (workshops carried out in a private house, room etc by members of the family living there)

The act excluded domestic workshops carrying out straw-plait making, pillow lace making or glove-making and empowered the Home Secretary to extend this exemption. The act also excluded domestic workshops involving non-strenuous work carried out intermittently and not providing the principal source of income of the family.

Requirements and enforcement arrangements were most stringent for textile factories, least stringent for domestic workshops (and the inspectorate had no powers to secure entry into dwellings). The act gave the Home Secretary some latitude to vary the requirements for specific industries (but not individual workplaces) to accommodate existing practices where these were not detrimental to the underlying purpose of the act.

The act followed the recommendations of the Commission by setting a limit of 56 1/2 hours on the hours worked per week by women and young persons in textile factories, 60 hours in non-textile factories and workshops (except domestic workshops, where there was no restriction on the working hours of women), but allowing greater flexibility on how those hours were worked for non-textile factories and workshops. The ban on Sunday working (and on late working on Saturday) was modified to apply instead to the Jewish Sabbath where both employer and employees were Jewish. Except in domestic workshops, protected persons were to have two full holidays and eight half-holidays The full holidays would normally be Christmas Day and Good Friday, but other holidays could be substituted for Good Friday (in Scotland and for all-Jewish workplaces, substitution for Christmas Day was allowed; Ireland kept Saint Patrick's Day as a holiday). Half holidays could be combined to give additional full-day holidays; it had to be clarified later that the act's definition of a half-holiday as "at least half" of a full day's employment "on some day other than Saturday" was to give the minimum duration of a half-holiday, not to prohibit one being taken on a Saturday.

Children were not to be employed under the age of ten, and should attend school half-time until fourteen (or until thirteen if they had a good record of school attendance and satisfactory scholastic achievement). (In Scotland, for factory children only, this overrode attempts by local school boards to set standards of scholastic attainment to be met before a child could cease full-time schooling; the Scottish education acts ceded precedence to the factory acts. In England and Wales it was unclear whether factory acts or education acts had precedence until the Elementary Education Act 1880 (43 & 44 Vict. c. 23) settled the matter in favour of school board bye-laws, but without any standardisation of criteria between different boards. Specification of a minimum educational attainment before a factory child could work half-time then became enforceable in England, but remained unenforceable in Scotland until passage of the Education (Scotland) Act 1883 (46 & 47 Vict. c. 56).) 'Half-time' could be achieved by splitting each day between school and work, or (unless the child worked in a domestic workshop) by working and attending school on alternate days. If the former, the child should work morning and afternoons on alternate weeks; if the latter the schooldays in one week should be workdays the next (and vice versa). No child should work a half-day on successive Saturdays. Surgeons no longer certified the apparent age of a child (or young person), age now being substantiated by a birth certificate or school register entry, but (for employment in factories) they were required to certify the fitness for the work of children and young persons under the age of sixteen.

Protected persons should not be allowed to clean moving machinery, the requirement to guard machinery now extended to the protection of men as well as protected persons, and the Home Secretary might direct that some or all of the fine imposed for a breach of this requirement be paid to any person injured (or the relatives of any person killed) as a result. (Guarding was now only unnecessary if the position of machinery meant it was equally safe if unguarded, but hoists still only needed to be guarded if a person might pass close to them.) There were restrictions on the employment of some classes of protected persons on processes injurious to health. Young persons and children could not work in the manufacture of white lead, or silvering mirrors using mercury; children and female young persons could not be employed in glass works; girls under sixteen could not be employed in the manufacture of bricks, (non-ornamental) tiles, or salt; children could not be employed in the dry grinding of metals or the dipping of lucifer matches. Inspectors were given powers to require the mitigation of dusty atmospheres by mechanical ventilation or other mechanical means.

=== Repealed enactments ===
Section 107 of the act repealed 18 enactments, listed in the seventh schedule to the act. Section 107 of the act also provided that notices, appointments, certificates, orders and standards made under previous acts would remain valid as if they were made under the act, and that the repeals would not affect anything done or any obligation, liabilities, penalties, punishments or legal proceedings under the repealed acts. Section 107 of the act also provided that a child exempted by section 8 of the Elementary Education Act 1876 (39 & 40 Vict. c. 79) from section 12 of the Factory Act 1874 (37 & 38 Vict. c. 44) by reason of being 11 years old before 1 January 1877 would, upon becoming 13 years, be deemed a young person old within the meaning of the act.

Citation	Short Title	Title	Extent of repeal
42 Geo. 3. c. 73	Health and Morals of Apprentices Act 1802	An Act for the preservation of the health and morals of apprentices and others employed in cotton and other mills and cotton and other factories.	The whole act.
3 & 4 Will. 4. c. 103	Labour of Children, etc., in Factories Act 1833	An Act to regulate the labour of children and young persons in the mills and factories of the United Kingdom.	The whole act.
7 & 8 Vict. c. 15	Factory Act 1844	An Act to amend the laws relating to labour in factories.	The whole act.
9 & 10 Vict. c. 40	Ropeworks Act 1846	An Act to declare certain ropeworks to be within the operation of the Factory Acts.	The whole act.
13 & 14 Vict. c. 54	Factory Act 1850	An Act to amend the Acts relating to labour in factories.	The whole act.
16 & 17 Vict. c. 104	Factory Act 1853	An Act further to regulate the employment of children in factories.	The whole act.
19 & 20 Vict. c. 38	Factory Act 1856	The Factory Act, 1856	The whole act.
24 & 25 Vict. c. 117	Lace Factory Act 1861	An Act to place the employment of women, young persons, youths, and children in lace factories under the regulations of the Factories Acts.	The whole act.
26 & 27 Vict. c. 40	Bakehouse Regulation Act 1863	The Bakehouse Regulation Act, 1863	The whole act.
27 & 28 Vict. c. 48	Factory Acts Extension Act 1864	The Factory Acts Extension Act, 1864	The whole act.
29 & 30 Vict. c. 90	Sanitary Act 1866	The Sanitary Act, 1866	The following words (so far as unrepealed) in section nineteen, "not already under the operation of any general Act for the regulation of factories or bakehouses".
30 & 31 Vict. c. 103	Factory Acts Extension Act 1867	The Factory Acts Extension Act, 1867	The whole act.
30 & 31 Vict. c. 146	Workshop Regulation Act 1867	The Workshop Regulation Act, 1867	The whole act.
33 & 34 Vict. c. 62	Factory and Workshop Act 1870	The Factory and Workshop Act, 1870	The whole act.
34 & 35 Vict. c. 19	Factory and Workshop (Jews) Act 1871	An Act for exempting persons professing the Jewish religion from penalties in respect of young persons and females professing the said religion working on Sundays	The whole act.
34 & 35 Vict. c. 104	Factory and Workshop Act 1871	The Factory and Workshop Act, 1871	The whole act.
37 & 38 Vict. c. 44	Factory Act 1874	The Factory Act, 1874	The whole act.
38 & 39 Vict. c. 55	Public Health Act 1875	The Public Health Act, 1875	The following words in section four, "more than twenty," and the words "at one time," and the following words in section ninety-one, "not already under the operation of any general Act for the regulation of factories or bakehouses".
39 & 40 Vict. c. 79	Elementary Education Act 1876	The Elementary Education Act, 1876	Section eight and the following words in section forty-eight, "the Factory Acts, 1833 to 1874, as amended by this Act, and includes the Workshop Acts, 1867 to 1871, as amended by this Act, and".

== Subsequent developments ==
The act was described as a consolidation act.

=== Subsequent minor acts ===
Factory and Workshop Act 1883 (Note: Section 1.)
- Act of Parliament
- Parliament of the United Kingdom
- Long title: An Act to amend the Law relating to certain Factories and Workshops.
- Citation: 46 & 47 Vict. c. 53
- Territorial extent: United Kingdom

Dates
- Royal assent: 25 August 1883
- Commencement: 1 January 1884 (Note: Section 2.)
- Repealed: 1 January 1902
Other legislation
Amends	Factory and Workshop Act 1878
Amended by	Factory and Workshop Act 1891; Public Health (London) Act 1891; Factory and Workshop Act 1895
Repealed by	Factory and Workshop Act 1901
Relates to	Metropolis Management Act 1855; Public Health (Scotland) Act 1867; Public Health (Ireland) Act 1878; Factory and Workshop Act 1891

Status: Repealed

Text of statute as originally enacted

The Factory and Workshop Act 1883 (46 & 47 Vict. c. 53) gave additional powers for the regulation of white-lead manufacture and bakehouses (but sanitary requirements for retail bakehouses were to be enforced by local authorities); in the same session a private member's bill intended to prohibit the employment of female children in the manufacture of nails was defeated at Second Reading.

Factory and Workshop Amendment (Scotland) Act 1888 (Note: Section 1.)
- Act of Parliament
- Parliament of the United Kingdom
- Long title: An Act to amend the Factory and Workshops Act, 1878.
- Citation: 51 & 52 Vict. c. 22
- Territorial extent: Scotland (Note: Section 2.)

Dates
- Royal assent: 7 August 1888
- Commencement: 1 September 1888 (Note: Section 2.)
- Repealed: 1 January 1892
Other legislation
Amends	Factory and Workshops Act 1878
Repealed by	Factory and Workshop Act 1891

Status: Repealed

Text of statute as originally enacted

The Factory and Workshop Amendment (Scotland) Act 1888 (51 & 52 Vict. c. 22) affected the choice of full-day holidays in Scottish burghs; formerly they had been the sacramental fast days specified by the local church – they could now be specified by the burgh magistrates.

Cotton Cloth Factories Act 1889 (Note: Section 1.)
- Act of Parliament
- Parliament of the United Kingdom
- Long title: An Act to make further provision for the regulation of Cotton Cloth Factories.
- Citation: 52 & 53 Vict. c. 62
- Territorial extent: United Kingdom

Dates
- Royal assent: 30 August 1889
- Commencement: 1 March 1890 (Note: Section 2.)
- Repealed: 1 January 1902
Other legislation
Amends	Factory And Workshop Act 1878
Amended by	Factory and Workshop Act 1895
Repealed by	Factory and Workshop Act 1901
Relates to	Factory and Workshop Act 1891; Cotton Cloth Factories Act 1897

Status: Repealed

Text of statute as originally enacted

The Cotton Cloth Factories Act 1889 (52 & 53 Vict. c. 62) set limits on temperature (and humidity at a given temperature) where cotton cloth was being woven. (Note: The problem this addressed was the risk to health to workers in damp clothing leaving a hot mill for the ambient temperature of a mill town. A more comprehensive amendment of the Factory Act had been drafted, but parliamentary time could not be found.)

Cotton Cloth Factories Act 1897 (Note: Section 2.)
- Act of Parliament
- Parliament of the United Kingdom
- Long title: An Act to give power to make Regulations with respect to Cotton Cloth Factories.
- Citation: 60 & 61 Vict. c. 58
- Territorial extent: United Kingdom

Dates
- Royal assent: 6 August 1897
- Commencement: 6 August 1897 (Note: The Acts of Parliament (Commencement) Act 1793.)
- Repealed: 1 January 1902
Other legislation
Repealed by	Factory and Workshop Act 1901
Relates to	Factory and Workshop Act 1891; Cotton Cloth Factories Act 1897

Status: Repealed

Text of statute as originally enacted

The Cotton Cloth Factories Act 1897 (60 & 61 Vict. c. 58) allowed the secretary of state to make regulations for the purposes of giving effect to the recommendations of the report dated 17 February 1897 of the committee appointed 28 March 1896 to inquire into the working of the Cotton Cloth Factories Act 1889 (52 & 53 Vict. c. 62)

=== Inadequate resources for strict enforcement ===
Shop Hours Regulation Act 1886 (Note: Section 1.)
- Act of Parliament
- Parliament of the United Kingdom
- Long title: An Act to limit the Hours of Labour of Children and Young Persons in Shops.
- Citation: 49 & 50 Vict. c. 55
- Territorial extent: United Kingdom

Dates
- Royal assent: 25 June 1886
- Commencement: 1 November 1886 (Note: Section 2.)
- Expired: 1 January 1889
- Repealed: 25 July 1898
Other legislation
Amends	Factory and Workshop Act 1878
Repealed by	Statute Law Revision Act 1898

Status: Repealed

Text of statute as originally enacted

The TUC had few complaints about the act, but complained that the inspectorate enforcing it was too small and lacking in 'practical men'. The latter complaint was partially addressed by changing the recruitment process and appointing a number of former trade union officials to the inspectorate. The total number of inspectors increased from 38 in 1868 to 56 in 1885, but (the general secretary of the TUC complained) these had to cover the more than 110,000 workplaces registered (in 1881) and attempt to detect unregistered workplaces falling within the scope of the act: 16 out of 39 districts in England had no registered workshops and only half the registered workshops had been inspected in 1881. When, after several unsuccessful attempts to extend some of the protections of the act to shopworkers, Sir John Lubbock succeeded in securing passage of a Shop Hours Regulation Act 1886 (49 & 50 Vict. c. 55) at the end of the 1886 session, the act made no provision for (and the Home Secretary Hugh Childers refused to accept any amendment allowing) enforcement by inspection. (Note: Gladstone's administration had been defeated on Irish issues; a dissolution was to follow once essential non-controversial bills had been passed. Therefore, no controversial amendments to the bill could be accepted; its remaining opponents also objected to its treatment as non-controversial.) The Evening Standard thought that this meant the act would be a dead letter, given experiences with the Factory Acts:

The Factory Acts are enforced by an elaborate machinery of inspection. Anyone who has taken the trouble to inquire into the matter knows perfectly well that without this stringent inspection they would be absolutely worthless. Even as it is they are contravened openly every day, because the best inspection must, from the nature of the case, be somewhat spasmodic and uncertain. When an Inspector discovers that the law has been broken he summons the offending party; but, as a rule, if he does not make the discovery himself, no one informs him of it. The chief provisions of the last Factory Act are hung up, legibly printed on white cardboard, "plain for all men to see", in every room of every factory. No one can be ignorant of them; yet when they are disregarded, as they are constantly, it is the rarest thing for any of the women affected by the illegality to give information.

=== Repeal ===
The whole act was repealed by section 161 of, and part I of the seventh schedule to, the Factory and Workshop Act 1901 (1 Edw. 7. c. 22), which came into force on 1 January 1902.
