= Jig concentrators =

Devices that separate materials of different densities

Jig concentrators are devices used mainly in the mining industry for mineral processing, to separate particles within the ore body, based on their specific gravity (relative density).

The particles would usually be of a similar size, often crushed and screened prior to being fed over the jig bed. There are many variations in design; however the basic principles are constant: The particles are introduced to the jig bed (usually a screen) where they are thrust upward by a pulsing water column or body, resulting in the particles being suspended within the water. As the pulse dissipates, the water level returns to its lower starting position and the particles once again settle on the jig bed. As the particles are exposed to gravitational energy whilst in suspension within the water, those with a higher specific gravity (density) settle faster than those with a lower count, resulting in a concentration of material with higher density at the bottom, on the jig bed. The particles are now concentrated according to density and can be extracted from the jig bed separately. In the mining of most heavy minerals, the denser material would be the desired mineral and the rest would be discarded as floats (or tailings).

There are some minerals, notably coal, that are lighter (lower in density) than the surrounding rock and in such instances the process of extraction would work in reverse, i.e. the coal would settle on top with the rock below (on the jig bed). There are several designs and methods of extraction from the jig bed.

== See also ==
- Mineral jig
