= NIAflow =

Simulation software designed by Haver & Boecker Niagara

NIAflow®
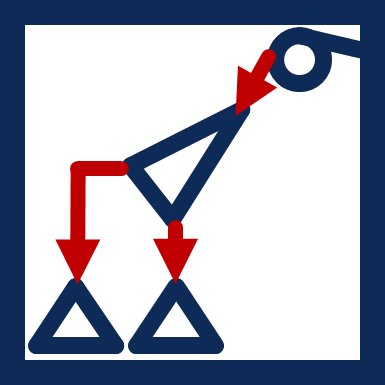
- Developers: Haver & Boecker oHG
- Initial release: 2016
- Written in: Visual Basic.NET
- Operating system: Windows
- Available in: English
- Type: Simulation software
- License: Proprietary
- Website: www.niaflow.com

NIAflow is a simulation software developed by Haver & Boecker Niagara for the design, optimization, and analysis of mineral processing plants. It is widely used in industries such as mining, aggregates, and recycling to model process flows, evaluate equipment performance, and conduct cost-benefit analyses. This software enables users to create digital representations of plants and simulate various processing scenarios for improved decision-making.

== History ==
NIAflow is used to design new mineral processing plants as well as optimize existing plants. Applying machine-specific parameters, this software computes the material flow through entire plants and provides product forecasts. Based on these results, process layout and machinery setup can be evaluated.

NIAflow was launched in 2016 by Haver & Boecker Niagara, the international mineral processing brand of Haver & Boecker. It was designed in response to growing demand for digital tools that support process optimization in material processing plants. The aim was to offer engineers a visual, intuitive platform to design process flowsheets, perform simulations, and identify potential improvements in plant efficiency and performance.

Over the years, NIAflow has evolved significantly, with regular updates introducing enhanced simulation capabilities, new equipment models, improved reporting features, and expanded training resources. The software has become a central tool in both greenfield plant design and the optimization of existing operations.

== Features ==
NIAflow provides a graphical interface that allows users to create process flowsheets by dragging and dropping equipment modules. The flowsheet can represent various stages of mineral processing, including crushing, grinding, screening, washing, sorting and dedusting. Each process unit is backed by a calculation model that simulates mass and volume flows, particle size distribution, moisture content, and other critical parameters.

Key features include:

- Mass and material balance calculations across entire circuits
- Realistic simulation of closed-loop processes, screening performance, and sorting mechanisms(e.g. by density, color, or magnetic properties)
- Equipment sizing tools for screens, conveyors, and other machines
- Labeling and annotation tools for detailed flowsheet documentation
- Exportable reports including flowsheet graphics (up to A0), equipment lists, and performance summaries

The Mining version of NIAflow additionally includes cost analysis features, enabling users to assess capital and operating expenditures, estimate break-even points, and evaluate economic feasibility.

== Supported Object groups ==
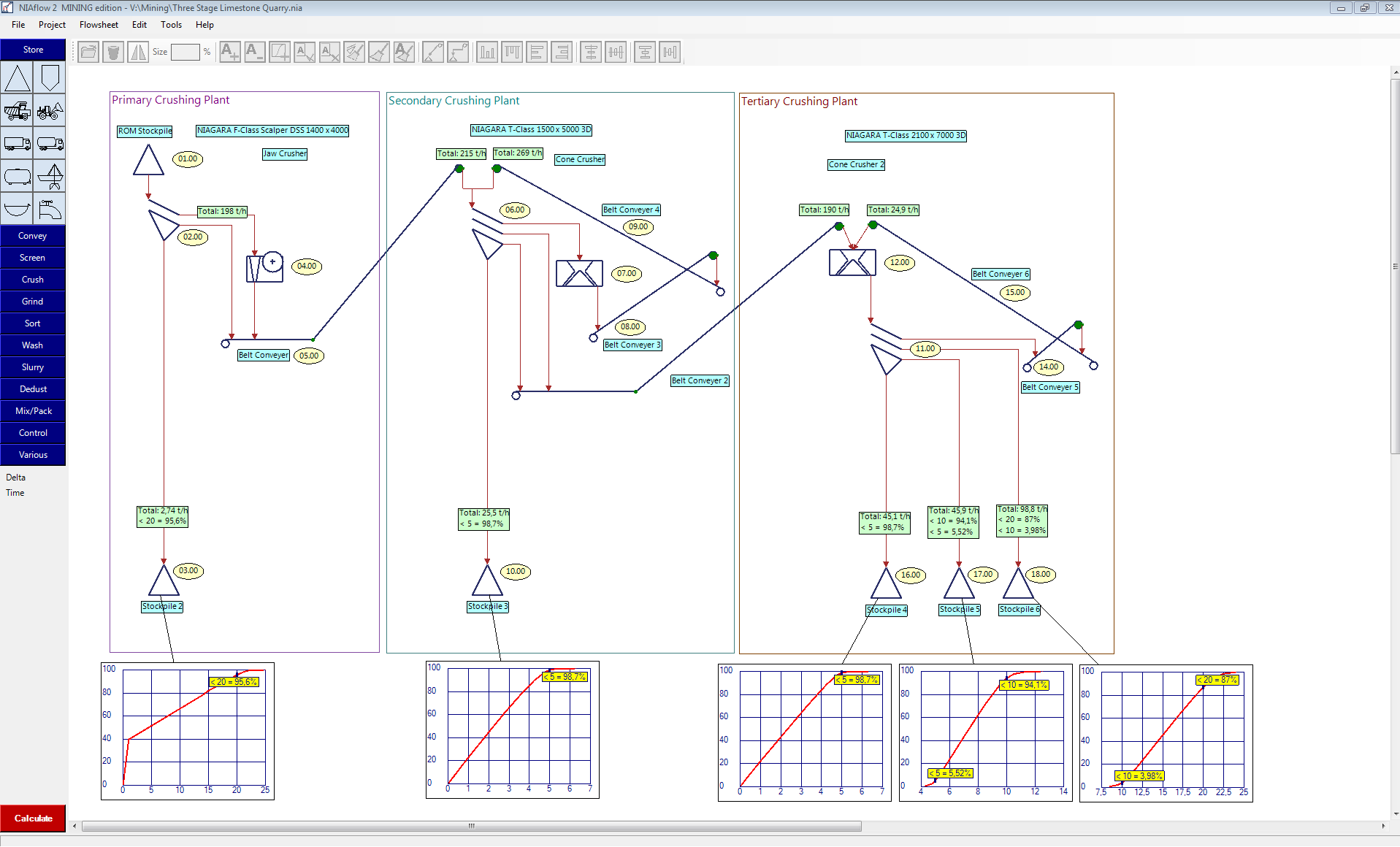
NIAflow Flowsheet Representing a Three-Stage Limestone Quarry

- Crushing Equipment: Jaw crushers, cone crushers, roll crushers, impact (HSI/VSI) crushers
- Screening Units: Single- to multi-deck screens, grizzly feeders, roller screens, sieve bends
- Conveying Systems: Belt conveyors, vibrating feeders, apron feeders, splitters, elevators, rotary valves, chutes, pipes
- Sorting and Separation: Spiral sorters, jigs, optical sorters, magnetic separators, eddy current devices, flotation cells
- Washing Equipment: Hydro-clean, log washers, bucket wheels, sand screws, hydrocyclones, drum washers
- Grinding and Milling: SAG mills, ball mills, rod mills
- Slurry Treatment: Thickeners, filter presses, clarifiers, centrifuges, flocculators
- Dust Control Systems: Dust hoods bag filters, cyclone separators, air blowers, silo filters
- Control and Instrumentation: Valves (manual, motorized, pneumatic), flow meters, level sensors, control cabinets
- Packing and Agglomeration: Pelletizing discs, mixers
- Storage and Handling: Stockpiles, silos, bunkers, hoppers, trucks, tanks

== Technical description ==
The calculation in NIAflow follows the flow of the material through the plant. When the plant layout contains closed circuits, NIAflow will repeat the calculation until a stationary condition is reached. During calculation, user-selectable limits are being watched, e.g. maximum tonnage throughput. NIAflow raises an error when those limits are exceeded.

Material Handling and Object Calculation: Most objects in NIAflow are connected by lines where each line represents a material transported from one object to another. Any number of incoming lines can be attached to an in-point of an object. During calculation, all incoming materials are blended into a new material. Calculations are dependent on the type of object. At the conclusion of object calculation, the resulting material product(s) are connected to the out-point(s) of the object.

Curve Interpolation: Particle Size Distributions (PSD) in NIAflow are generated using either linear or 3D+ (cubic spline) interpolation methods and can be viewed on Linear, Log, Log-Log and RRSB grids.^{[2]} Interpolation methods and grids are stored together with the object properties.

Blending: During blending, all material parameters are being re-calculated. Depending on the type of parameter the result can be the sum of the material properties (e.g. tph) or the weighted average (e.g. temperature). The Particle Size Distribution (PSD) of the blended material is computed by applying all sieves of the materials to the new one and calculating percentages based on the current grid and curve interpolation method.

Classifying: Classifying objects are various screens as well as objects that can be set up for either sorting or classifying, e.g. upstream sorter/classifier. Classifying is performed by means of cut-curves (Tromp Curve).^{[3]} Tromp curves describe the probability for a certain material fraction to arrive in the coarse product. For screens, NIAflow generates cut curves automatically based on the machine and media setup. For other machines, user input is required to define the cut curve.

Sorting: Similar to classifying sorting is performed based on cut curves that have to be entered by the user. Sorting properties are stored for each individual material fraction. NIAflow supports sorting by density, color, shape, metal content, etc.

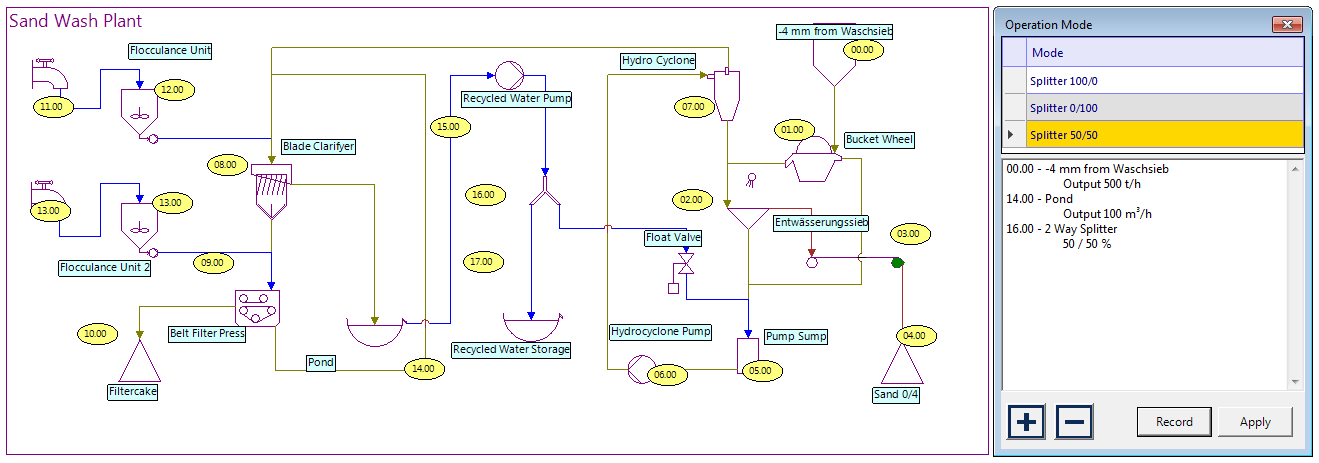
NIAflow Feature Operation Mode

Crushing, Milling: Crusher and mill products are calculated assuming a linear behavior of the product PSD in either a double logarithmic or RRSB grid. Each type of crushing or grinding machine creates its own specific inclination of the curve. The inclination combined with the maximum particle size leaving the machine is used for product forecast.

Operation Modes: A plant can be set up in various operational modes, depending on how the objects that control the feed rate are set up. These objects are: Stockpile, Silo, Pond, Water Tank, 2 Way Splitter and 3 Way Splitter. The settings of these objects can be varied and various operational modes can be stored with the project.

== Editions ==
NIAflow is offered in two versions, tailored to different user needs:

NIAflow Basic:

A free version that includes core features such as drag-and-drop flowsheet design, mass flow simulation, and screening calculation. It supports basic process modeling and is suitable for educational purposes, conceptual studies, and small-scale projects.

NIAflow Mining:

A commercial version with expanded functionality. It includes a broader library of equipment modules (e.g. classifiers, sorters, washers), support for large-scale simulations, integrated cost modeling, and advanced documentation tools. This edition is intended for professional use in plant design, feasibility studies, and operational optimization.

NIAflow Campus:

A free academic version offering nearly the same feature set as the Mining edition. It is available to students, lecturers, and academic institutions upon registration. This version is intended to support teaching and research in the field of mineral processing and process engineering.

== Applications ==
NIAflow is used in a wide range of mineral processing scenarios, from simple crushing and screening setups to complex processing plants. Common applications include:

- Design and optimization of crushing and screening circuits
- Modeling of wet processing operations including washing, classification, and dewatering and water treatment
- Simulation of sorting processes (e.g. by color, density, or magnetism)
- Evaluation of grinding and pelletizing stages in mineral processing
- Planning of recycling and sand reclamation operations

The software is utilized by mining companies, engineering consultancies, equipment manufacturers, and universities. Its ability to simulate real-world plant behavior and identify process bottlenecks has made it a valuable tool in the planning and operation of mineral processing systems.

== Availability and Support ==
NIAflow is a desktop application available for Windows operating systems. The software can be downloaded directly from the official website (niaflow.com). Haver & Boecker Niagara offers comprehensive support, including user manuals, tutorials, example projects, and training sessions for both individuals and companies.

Technical support and software updates are provided for licensed users of the Mining version. A dedicated online resource section is available to assist new users and provide ongoing learning materials.

== See also ==
- Mineral Processing
- Screening
- Log-Log Scale
