= Belt press =

Belt printing is a method for printing. A belt printer uses huge screens that cover the entire front and back of the garment. The method is best for all-over pattern printing, but works best on designs with limited colors.
