= Recovery (mineral processing) =

In mineral processing, recovery or recovery rate is the mass fraction of a valuable mineral that is carried over in a beneficiation process from the ore feedstock to the concentrate. For example, 90% recovery of a metal indicates that 10% were "rejected", sent by the ore mill into the tailings along with the gangue:

$\mathrm{recovery}=\frac{\mbox{mass of valuable mineral in concentrate}}{\mbox{mass of valuable mineral in feed}}$

In cases where a valuable metal, for example iron (Fe) is being recovered from a range of minerals, such hematite (Fe_{2}O_{3}), goethite (FeO(OH)) and magnetite (Fe_{3}O_{4}) from iron ore, the definition is broadened:

$\mathrm{recovery}=\frac{\mbox{mass of elemental metal in concentrate}}{\mbox{mass of elemental metal in feed}}$

In such cases, terminology like iron recovery or 'recovery (%Fe)' is used.

The term weight recovery (also referred to as yield) is also applied, and refers to ratio of the mass of concentrate to the mass of feed:

$\mathrm{weight recovery}=\frac{\mbox{mass of concentrate}}{\mbox{mass of feed}}$

Recovery features in grade-recovery curves that communicate how 'upgrading' an ore often comes at the cost of decreasing recovery.

== Sources ==
- Wills, Barry A.; Finch, James A. (2016). "Introduction". Wills' Mineral Processing Technology. Elsevier. 1.9.2 Recovery. doi:10.1016/b978-0-08-097053-0.00001-7. ISBN 978-0-08-097053-0.
