= Mineral processing =

Process of separating commercially valuable minerals from their ores

Crushing, a form of comminution, one of the unit operations of mineral processing

Mineral processing is the process of separating commercially valuable minerals from their ores in the field of extractive metallurgy. Depending on the processes used in each instance, it is often referred to as ore dressing or ore milling.

Beneficiation is any process that improves (benefits) the economic value of the ore by removing the gangue minerals, which results in a higher grade product (ore concentrate) and a waste stream (tailings). There are many different types of beneficiation, with each step furthering the concentration of the original ore. Key is the concept of recovery, the mass (or equivalently molar) fraction of the valuable mineral (or metal) extracted from the ore and carried across to the concentrate.

Processing of rare-earth minerals, often found in mineral sands, is often done by a mineral separation plant.

== History ==
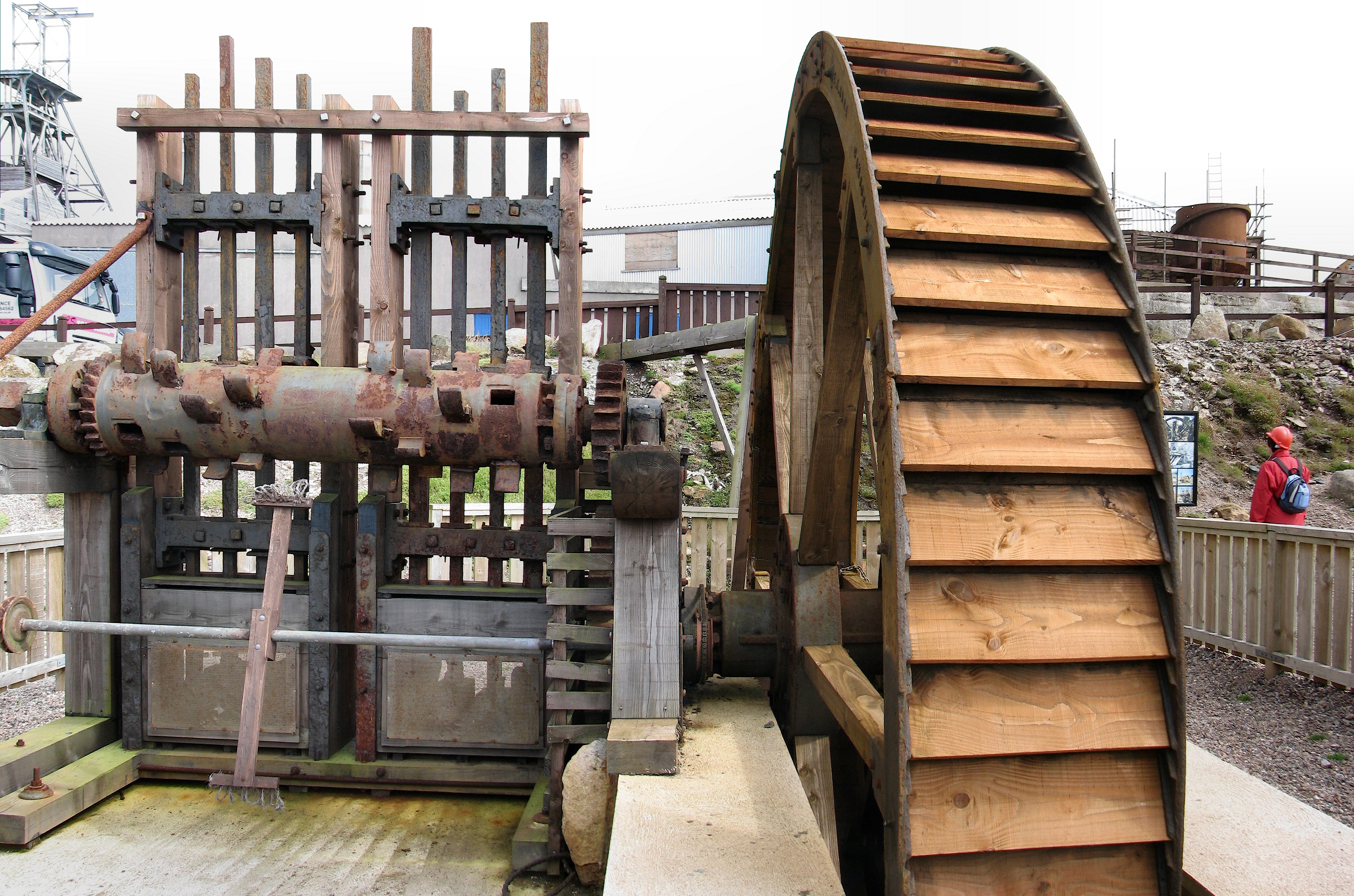
A set of Cornish stamps

Before the advent of heavy machinery, raw ore was broken up using hammers wielded by hand, a process called "spalling". Eventually, mechanical means were found to achieve this. For instance, stamp mills were being used in central Asia in the vicinity of Samarkand as early as 973. There is evidence the process was in use in Persia in the early medieval period. By the 11th century, stamp mills were in widespread use throughout the medieval Islamic world, from Islamic Spain and North Africa in the west to Central Asia in the east. A later example was the Cornish stamps, consisting of a series of iron hammers mounted in a vertical frame, raised by cams on the shaft of a waterwheel and falling onto the ore under gravity.

Iron beneficiation has been evident since as early as 800 BC in China with the use of bloomery. A bloomery is the original form of smelting and allowed people to make fires hot enough to melt oxides into a liquid that separates from the iron. Although the bloomery was promptly phased out by the invention of the blast furnace, it was still heavily relied on in Africa and Europe until the early part of the second millennium. The blast furnace was the next step in smelting iron which produced pig iron. The first blast furnaces in Europe appeared in the early 1200s around Sweden and Belgium, and not until the late 1400s in England. The pig iron poured from a blast furnace is high in carbon making it hard and brittle, making it hard to work with. In 1856 the Bessemer process was invented that turns the brittle pig iron into steel, a more malleable metal. Since then, many different technologies have been invented to replace the Bessemer process such as the electric arc furnace, basic oxygen steelmaking, and direct reduced iron (DRI).

For sulfide ores, a different process is taken for beneficiation. The ore needs to have the sulfur removed before smelting can begin. Roasting is the primary method of separating, where wood was placed on heaps of ore and set on fire to help with oxidation.

2 Cu_{2}S + 3 O_{2} → 2 Cu_{2}O + 2 SO_{2}

The earliest practices of roasting were done outside, allowing large clouds of sulfur dioxide to blow over the land causing serious harm to surrounding ecosystems, both aquatic and terrestrial. The clouds of sulfur dioxide combined with local deforestation for wood needed for roasting compounded damages to the environment, as seen in Sudbury, Ontario and the Inco Superstack.

The simplest method of separating ore from the gangue consists of picking out the individual crystals of each. This is a very tedious process, particularly when the individual particles are small. Another comparatively simple method relies on the various minerals having different densities, causing them to collect in different places: metallic minerals (being heavier) will drop out of suspension more quickly than lighter ones, which will be carried further by a stream of water. The process of panning and sifting for gold uses both of these methods. Various devices known as 'bundles' were used to take advantage of this property. Later, more advanced machines were used such as the Frue vanner, invented in 1874.

Other equipment used historically includes the hutch, a trough used with some ore-dressing machines and the keeve or kieve, a large tub used for differential settlement.

== Types of separation ==
=== Disaggregation ===
Beneficiation can begin within the mine itself. Most mines will have a crusher within the mine itself where separation of ore and gangue minerals occurs and as a side effect becomes easier to transport. After the crusher the ore will go through a grinder or a mill to get the ore into fine particles. Dense media separation (DMS) is used to further separate the desired ore from rocks and gangue minerals. This will stratify the crushed aggregate by density making separation easier. Where the DMS occurs in the process can be important, the grinders or mills will process much less waste rock if the DMS occurs beforehand. This will lower wear on the equipment as well as operating costs since there is a lower volume being put through.

=== Physical separation ===
After the milling stage the ore can be further separated from the rock. One way this can be achieved is by using the physical properties of the ore to separate it from the rest of the rock. Prior to any physical separation process, sizing of ore particles is important for effective separation. This is done by using either Industrial Screens or Classifiers.

These processes are gravity separation, flotation, and magnetic separation. Gravity separation uses centrifugal forces and specific gravity of ores and gangue to separate them. Magnetic separation is used to separate magnetic gangue from the desired ore, or conversely to remove a magnetic target ore from nonmagnetic gangue. DMS is also considered a physical separation.

=== Chemical separation ===
Some ore physical properties can not be relied on for separation, therefore chemical processes are used to separate the ores from the rock. Froth flotation, leaching, and electrowinning are the most common types of chemical separation. Froth flotation uses hydrophobic and hydrophilic properties to separate the ore from the gangue. Hydrophobic particles will rise to the top of the solution to be skimmed off. Changes to pH in the solution can influence what particles will be hydrophilic. Leaching works by dissolving the desired ore into solution from the rock. Electrowinning is not a primary method of separation, but is required to get the ore out of solution after leaching.

== Unit operations ==
Mineral processing can involve four general types of unit operation: 1) Comminution – particle size reduction; 2) Sizing – separation of particle sizes by screening or classification 3) Concentration by taking advantage of physical and surface chemical properties 4) Dewatering – solid/liquid separation

=== Comminution ===
Comminution is particle size reduction of materials. Comminution may be carried out on either dry materials or slurries. Crushing and grinding are the two primary comminution processes. Crushing is normally carried out on run-of-mine ore, while grinding (normally carried out after crushing) may be conducted on dry or slurried material. In comminution, the size reduction of particles is done by three types of forces: compression, impact, and attrition. Compression and impact forces are extensively used in crushing operations while attrition is the dominant force in grinding. The primarily used equipment in crushing are jaw crushers, gyratory crushers and cone crushers whereas rod mills and ball mills, usually closed circuited with a classifier unit, are generally employed for grinding purposes in a mineral processing plant. Crushing is a dry process whereas grinding is generally performed wet and hence is more energy intensive.

=== Sizing ===
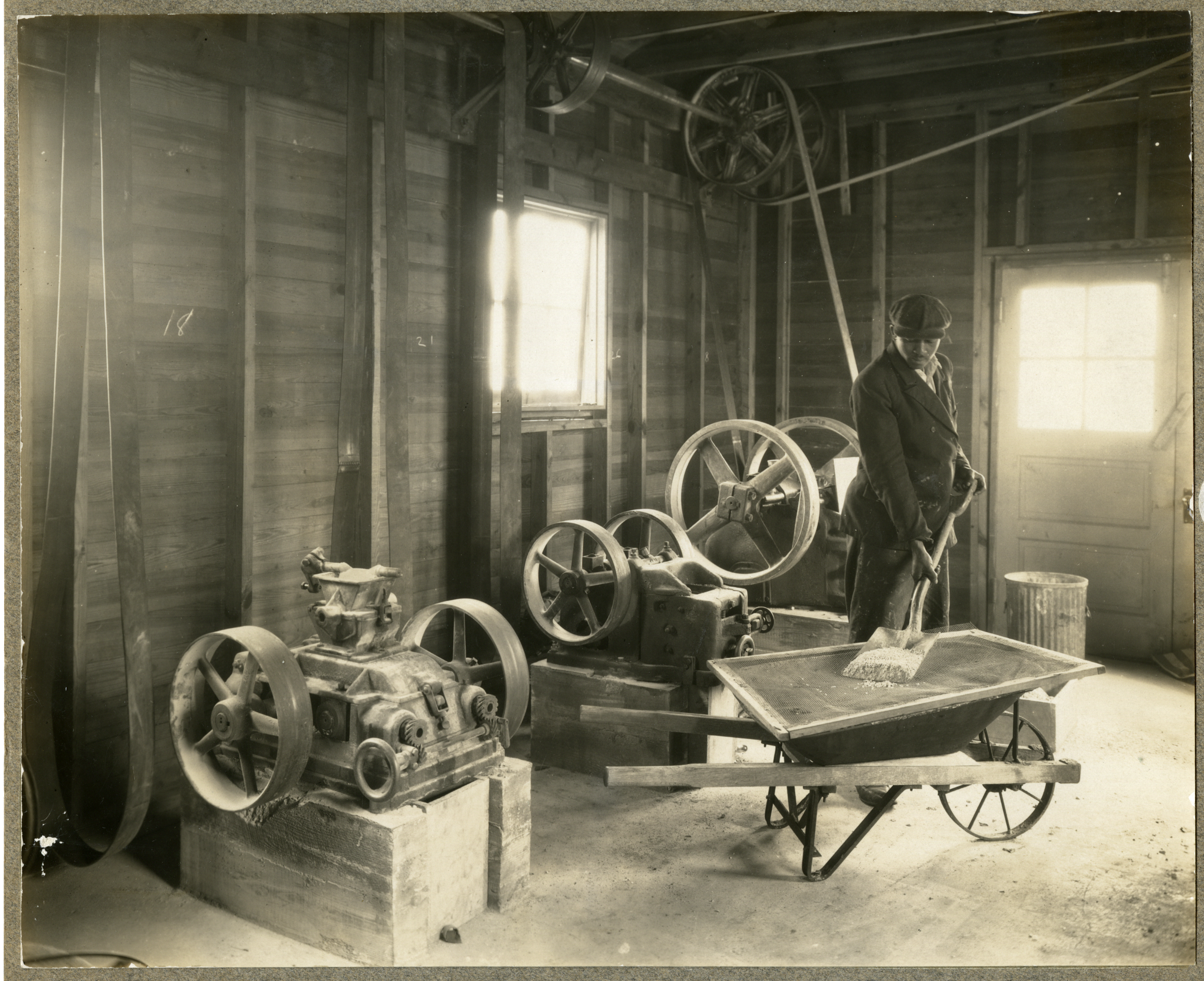
Screening ore through a sieve, Fixed Nitrogen Research Laboratory, 1930

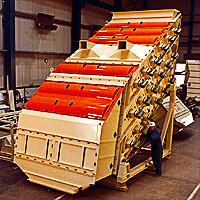
Sizer 2000 for screening coarse to small particles

Sizing is the general term for separation of particles according to their size. The simplest sizing process is screening, or passing the particles to be sized through a screen or number of screens. Screening equipment can include grizzlies, bar screens, wedge wire screens, radial sieves, banana screens, multi-deck screens, vibratory screen, fine screens, flip flop screens, and wire mesh screens. Screens can be static (typically the case for very coarse material), or they can incorporate mechanisms to shake or vibrate the screen. Some considerations in this process include the screen material, the aperture size, shape and orientation, the amount of near sized particles, the addition of water, the amplitude and frequency of the vibrations, the angle of inclination, the presence of harmful materials, like steel and wood, and the size distribution of the particles.

Classification refers to sizing operations that exploit the differences in settling velocities exhibited by particles of different size. Classification equipment may include ore sorters, gas cyclones, hydrocyclones, rotating trommels, rake classifiers or fluidized classifiers.

An important factor in both comminution and sizing operations is the determination of the particle size distribution of the materials being processed, commonly referred to as particle size analysis. Many techniques for analyzing particle size are used, and the techniques include both off-line analyses which require that a sample of the material be taken for analysis and on-line techniques that allow for analysis of the material as it flows through the process.

=== Concentration ===
There are a number of ways to increase the concentration of the wanted minerals: in any particular case, the method chosen will depend on the relative physical and surface chemical properties of the mineral and the gangue. Concentration is defined as the number of moles of a solute in a volume of the solution. In case of mineral processing, concentration means the increase of the percentage of the valuable mineral in the concentrate.

=== Gravity concentration ===
Gravity separation is the separation of two or more minerals of different specific gravity by their relative movement in response to the force of gravity and one or more other forces (such as centrifugal forces, magnetic forces, buoyant forces), one of which is resistance to motion (drag force) by a viscous medium such as heavy media, water or, less commonly, air.

Gravity separation is one of the oldest technique in mineral processing but has seen a decline in its use since the introduction of methods like flotation, classification, magnetic separation and leaching. Gravity separation dates back to at least 3000 BC when Egyptians used the technique for separation of gold.

It is necessary to determine the suitability of a gravity concentration process before it is employed for concentration of an ore. The concentration criterion is commonly used for this purpose, designated $CC$ in the following equation (where $SG$ represents specific gravity):

$$CC = \frac {SG(heavy\ mineral) - SG(fluid)}{SG(light\ mineral) - SG(fluid)}$$

- for CC > 2.5, suitable for separation of particles above 75 microns in size
- for 1.75 < CC < 2.5, suitable for separation of particles above 150 microns in size
- for 1.50 < CC < 1.75, suitable for separation of particles above 1.7 mm in size
- for 1.25 < CC < 1.50, suitable for separation of particles above 6.35 mm in size
- for CC < 1.25, not suitable for any size

Although concentration criteria is a useful rule of thumb when predicting amenability to gravity concentration, factors such as particle shape and relative concentration of heavy and light particles can dramatically affect separation efficiency in practice.

==== Classification ====
There are several methods that make use of the weight or density differences of particles:

- Heavy media or dense media separation (these include baths, drums, larcodems, dyana whirlpool separators, and dense medium cyclones)
- Shaking tables, such as the Wilfley table
- Spiral separators
- Reflux classifier
- Jig concentrators are continuous processing gravity concentration devices using a pulsating fluidized bed (RMS-Ross Corp. circular jig plants)
- Centrifugal bowl concentrators, such as the Knelson concentrator
- Multi-gravity separators including Knelson, Mozley (multi or enhanced) gravity separator, Salter cyclones (multi-gravity separator) and the Kelsey jig)
- Inline pressure jigs
- Reichert cones
- Sluices
- Elutriators
- Optima classifier- a water -only density separator. It is an engineered system that consists of feed preparation, beneficiation/separation and dewatering modules to ensure a high-quality product with the correct moisture content. Typical products consist of ash below 16% and a calorific value of at least 27-million joules per kilogram.

These processes can be classified as either density separation or gravity (weight) separation. In dense media separation a media is created with a density in between the density of the ore and gangue particles. When subjected to this media particles either float or sink depending on their density relative to the media. In this way the separation takes place purely on density differences and does not, in principle, relay on any other factors such as particle weight or shape. In practice, particle size and shape can affect separation efficiency. Dense medium separation can be performed using a variety of mediums. These include, organic liquids, aqueous solutions or suspensions of very fine particles in water or air. The organic liquids are typically not used due to their toxicity, difficulties in handling and relative cost. Industrially, the most common dense media is a suspension of fine magnetite and/or ferrosilicon particles. An aqueous solution as a dense medium is used in coal processing in the form of a belknap wash and suspensions in air are used in water-deficient areas, like areas of China, where sand is used to separate coal from the gangue minerals.

Gravity separation is also called relative gravity separation as it separates particles due to their relative response to a driving force. This is controlled by factors such as particle weight, size and shape. These processes can also be classified into multi-G and single G processes. The difference is the magnitude of the driving force for the separation. Multi-G processes allow the separation of very fine particles to occur (in the range of 5 to 50 micron) by increasing the driving force of separation in order to increase the rate at which particles separate. In general, single G process are only capable of processing particles that are greater than approximately 80 micron in diameter.

Of the gravity separation processes, the spiral concentrators and circular jigs are two of the most economical due to their simplicity and use of space. They operate by flowing film separation and can either use washwater or be washwater-less. The washwater spirals separate particles more easily but can have issues with entrainment of gangue with the concentrate produced.

=== Froth flotation ===
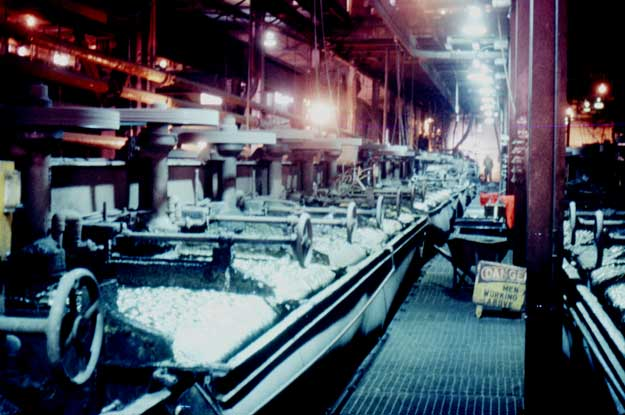
Froth flotation cells used to concentrate copper and nickel sulfide minerals

Froth flotation is used to separate particles with different surface chemistry. In flotation, bubbles are introduced into a pulp and the bubbles rise through the pulp. Hydrophobic particles become bound to the surface of the bubbles because of the change in the surface free energy. These bubbles rise through the slurry and are collected from the surface.

Different chemicals are added to the froth to enable this process:

- pH modifiers, which affect the chemisorption of collectors on the surface of the particles.
- Collectors (surfactants) that bind to the surface of the particles.
- Frothers that enable stable bubbles to be formed. Unstable bubbles would coalesce and minerals would fall off their surface.
- Depressants that inhibit the flotation of one mineral or minerals (e.g. CN^{−} that depresses all sulfides but galena)
- Activators that enable the flotation of others (Cu^{2+} ions, used for the flotation of sphalerite).

There are a number of cells able to be used for the flotation of minerals. These include flotation columns and mechanical flotation cells. The flotation columns are used for finer minerals and typically have a higher grade and lower recovery of minerals than mechanical flotation cells. The cells can have various sizes, some exceeding 300 m^{3}. Bigger cells are cheaper per unit volume than smaller cells, but harder to control.

Froth flotation was first used in the 19th century Australia to recover a sphalerite concentrate. Improving on the original process, the Jameson Cell was developed at the University of Newcastle, Australia. This operated by the use of a plunging jet that generates fine bubbles with higher kinetic energy. Further improvements include staged flotation reactors that split the flotation process into three defined stages per cell, requiring much less energy, air and installation space.

=== Electrostatic separation ===
There are two main types of electrostatic separators. These work in similar ways, but the forces applied to the particles are different and these forces are gravity and electrostatic attraction. The two types are electrodynamic separators (or high tension rollers) or electrostatic separators. In high tension rollers, particles are charged by a corona discharge. This charges the particles that subsequently travel on a drum. The conducting particles lose their charge to the drum and are removed from the drum with centripetal acceleration. Electrostatic plate separators work by passing a stream of particles past a charged anode. The conductors lose electrons to the plate and are pulled away from the other particles due to the induced attraction to the anode. These separators are used for particles between 75 and 250 micron and for efficient separation to occur, the particles need to be dry, have a close size distribution and uniform in shape. Of these considerations, one of the most important is the water content of the particles. This is important as a layer of moisture on the particles will render the non-conductors as conductors as the layer of the water is conductive.

Electrostatic plate separators are usually used for streams that have small conductors and coarse non-conductors. The high tension rollers are usually used for streams that have coarse conductors and fine non-conductors.

=== Magnetic separation ===
Magnetic separation is a process in which magnetically susceptible material is extracted from a mixture using a magnetic force. This separation technique can be useful in mining iron as it is attracted to a magnet. In mines where wolframite was mixed with cassiterite, such as South Crofty and East Pool mine in Cornwall or with bismuth such as at the Shepherd and Murphy mine in Moina, Tasmania, magnetic separation was used to separate the ores. At these mines a device called a Wetherill's Magnetic Separator (invented by John Price Wetherill, 1844–1906)[1] was used. In this machine the raw ore, after calcination was fed onto a moving belt which passed underneath two pairs of electromagnets under which further belts ran at right angles to the feed belt. The first pair of electromagnets was weakly magnetised and served to draw off any iron ore present. The second pair were strongly magnetised and attracted the wolframite, which is weakly magnetic. These machines were capable of treating 10 tons of ore a day. This process of separating magnetic substances from the non-magnetic substances in a mixture with the help of a magnet is called magnetic separation..

This process operates by moving particles in a magnetic field. The force experienced in the magnetic field is given by the equation f=m/k.H.dh/dx. with k=magnetic susceptibility, H-magnetic field strength, and dh/dx being the magnetic field gradient. As seen in this equation, the separation can be driven in two ways, either through a gradient in a magnetic field or the strength of a magnetic field. The different driving forces are used in the different concentrators. These can be either with water or without. Like the spirals, washwater aids in the separation of the particles while increases the entrainment of the gangue in the concentrate.

=== Automated ore sorting ===
Modern, automated sorting applies optical sensors (visible spectrum, near infrared, X-ray, ultraviolet), that can be coupled with electrical conductivity and magnetic susceptibility sensors, to control the mechanical separation of ore into two or more categories on an individual rock by rock basis. For diamond beneficiation, X-ray luminescence separation (XRL) is enhanced by pre-treating weakly luminescent diamonds with luminophore-containing agents that modify their spectral characteristics, improving recovery to over 90%. Also new sensors have been developed which exploit material properties such as electrical conductivity, magnetization, molecular structure and thermal conductivity. Sensor based sorting has found application in the processing of nickel, gold, copper, coal, and diamonds.

=== Dewatering ===
Dewatering is an important process in mineral processing. The purpose of dewatering is to remove water absorbed by the particles which increases the pulp density. This is done for a number of reasons, specifically, to enable ore handling and concentrates to be transported easily, allow further processing to occur and to dispose of the gangue. The water extracted from the ore by dewatering is recirculated for plant operations after being sent to a water treatment plant. The main processes that are used in dewatering include dewatering screens, sedimentation, filtering, and thermal drying. These processes increase in difficulty and cost as the particle size decreases.

Dewatering screens operate by passing particles over a screen. The particles pass over the screen while the water passes through the apertures in the screen. This process is only viable for coarse ores that have a close size distribution as the apertures can allow small particles to pass through.

Sedimentation operates by passing water into a large thickener or clarifier. In these devices, the particles settle out of the slurry under the effects of gravity, or centripetal forces. These are limited by the surface chemistry of the particles and the size of the particles. To aid in the sedimentation process, flocculants and coagulants are added to reduce the repulsive forces between the particles. This repulsive force is due to the double layer formed on the surface of the particles. The flocculants work by binding multiple particles together while the coagulants work by reducing the thickness of the charged layer on the outside of the particle. After thickening, slurry is often stored in ponds or impoundments. Alternatively, it can pumped into a belt press or membrane filter press to recycle process water and create stackable, dry filter cake, or "tailings".

Thermal drying is usually used for fine particles and to remove low water content in the particles. Some common processes include rotary dryers, fluidized beds, spray driers, hearth dryers and rotary tray dryers. This process is usually expensive to operate due to the fuel requirement of the dryers.

== Mineral separation plants ==
Some of the above methods, in particular magnetic, electrostatic, and gravity, are commonly used for separating light and heavy rare-earth minerals found in mineral sands, in mineral separation plants (MSPs), also known as dry mills, sometimes used in conjunction with, or after, wet concentration plants (WCPs).

== Other processes ==
Many mechanical plants also incorporate hydrometallurgical or pyrometallurgical processes as part of an extractive metallurgical operation. Geometallurgy is a branch of extractive metallurgy that combines mineral processing with the geologic sciences. This includes the study of oil agglomeration

Computer-based flowsheet simulation is also used to evaluate mineral processing circuits. Software used for this purpose includes MODSIM, USIM PAC, METSIM, JKSimMet, NIAflow and DPSIM.

A number of auxiliary materials handling operations are also considered a branch of mineral processing such as storage (as in bin design), conveying, sampling, weighing, slurry transport, and pneumatic transport.

The efficiency and efficacy of many processing techniques are influenced by upstream activities such as mining method and blending.

== Case examples ==
In the case of gold, after adsorbing onto carbon, it is put into a sodium hydroxide and cyanide solution. In the solution the gold is pulled out of the carbon and into the solution. The gold ions are removed from solution at steel wool cathodes from electrowinning. The gold then goes off to be smelted.

Lithium is hard to separate from gangue due to similarities in the minerals. In order to separate the lithium both physical and chemical separation techniques are used. First froth flotation is used. Due to similarities in mineralogy there is not complete separation after flotation. The gangue that is found with lithium after the flotation are often iron bearing. The float concentrate goes through magnetic separation to remove the magnetic gangue from the nonmagnetic lithium.

== See also ==
- Coal preparation plant
- Sensor-based sorting
- Dartmoor tin mining
- NIAflow
- Rocker box
- Refining (metallurgy)
- Taconite
