= Ellen Hooton =

British child labourer

Ellen Hooton was a ten-year-old girl from Wigan who gave testimony to the Central Board of His Majesty's Commissioners for inquiring into the Employment of Children in Factories, 1833. She had been working for several years at a spinning frame, in a cotton mill along with other children. She worked from 5.30 am till 8 pm, six days a week and nine hours on a Saturday. She absconded at least 10 times and was punished by her overseers.

She is of interest because of the insight it gives into factory conditions, and the relationship with her mother. The ensuing Royal Commission, acted on her evidence and the Factory Acts were changed to regulate the use of children in factories.

== Family circumstances ==
Ellen Hooton was born to unmarried 32-year-old Mary Hooton in 1822 or 1823. In 1829 she was a Dandy loom (Note: A Dandy loom was a hand loom that automatically ratcheted the take-up beam. Each time the weaver moved the sley to beat-up the weft, a rachet-and-pawl mechanism advanced the cloth roller. In 1802 William Ratcliffe of Stockport patented a Dandy loom with a cast iron frame. It was this type of Dandy loom that was used in the small Dandy Loom shops) weaver. Ellen's father was also a weaver. Under terms of an order placed on him, Mary received 1s.6d. a week for child support until Ellen was four years old. She then received 1s. a week until Ellen was seven and a half, at which time payments stopped.

The decade of the 1820s was difficult for weavers. Mary did not work from home but in a Dandy loom shop where several of these looms were housed - this would mean she did not own her own loom, and was paid for piece work. The piece work rates were reduced by 33% in 1828 and by 29% in 1829, effectively almost halving Mary's income. Ellen's father was by then out of work and so could not assist. By Ellen's account she entered the factory when she was not quite eight - though her mother claimed she was 'close upon nine years old'. The Cotton Mills and Factories Act 1819 had prevented the employment of children under nine. For the first six months in the factory, Ellen received no wages and so was technically being trained, not employed.

Mary's earnings in 1828 would be around 5s. a week, with an extra 1s. coming from the father. This dropped to 3s. a week. The average spinner in Wigan paid 1s. 6d. for rent and taxes and 1s. 2d. for fuel, soap, and candles: this left 4d. to spend on food. This, however, did not entitle her to any support from the parish. As a spinner tenting half a side, Ellen would earn 10½d. which would rise to 1s. 9d. for a full side: some girls managed 2 sides, earning 3s. 6d.

== Historical context ==
Wigan is a town in south-western Lancashire. It was no longer the "pretty market town built of stone and brick" as described by Celia Fiennes in 1698. It was a centre for coal production, and had a large number of handloom weavers who were struggling to exist. Prices fell as power looms were introduced into the mills.

Wigan's status as a centre for coal production, engineering and textiles in the 18th century had led to the Douglas Navigation in the 1740s, and later the diversion of the Leeds and Liverpool Canal to transport cloth and food grown on the West Lancashire Plain to the Port of Liverpool. With the expansion of industry coal became a valuable commodity.

As a mill town, Wigan was an important centre of textile manufacture during the Industrial Revolution but it was the mill owners that profited.

The Handweavers' Plight

"The cotton weavers who reside principally in the neighbourhood of Bolton, Chorley, Wigan, Blackburn, Haslingden, Padiham, Burnley, Colne and Todmorden are by far the most wretched body in this part of the country. The number of cotton weavers in the places above mentioned must exceed 60,000 and probably is near 100,000 and the utmost sum they can earn per week, on a fair average working diligently from six (am) till eight (pm), allowing out of that time an hour and a half for meals, is only 4 s., even if the loom be their own, but if they have to hire the loom, they pay 10d. a week for it, and they must also buy shuttles etc, and keep the loom in repair. Great numbers cannot earn two shillings and six pence, three shillings or three shillings and sixpence per week."

Extract from the Liverpool Commercial Chronicle, April 24th 1826

To put these prices into perspective, in 1826 a pound of bread cost 2d. and a pound of butter 1s.

Traditionally, Wigan had been a linen weaving area, relying on the hand loom: by 1826 the fibre was cotton and wages were falling. To the east, in Blackburn there was loom smashing and riots as the men tried to reverse the tide.

By 1818 there were eight cotton mills in the Wallgate part of Wigan. In 1818 William Woods introduced the first power looms to the Wigan cotton mills. These mills swiftly became infamous for their dangerous and unbearable conditions, low pay and use of child labour. Wigan was always an important centre for coal production. By 1854 there were 54 collieries in and around the town, about a sixth of all collieries in Lancashire.

Work in the mine was seen by the working class community as being a far lower status job for a child than one in a textile mill.

== Throstle spinning ==
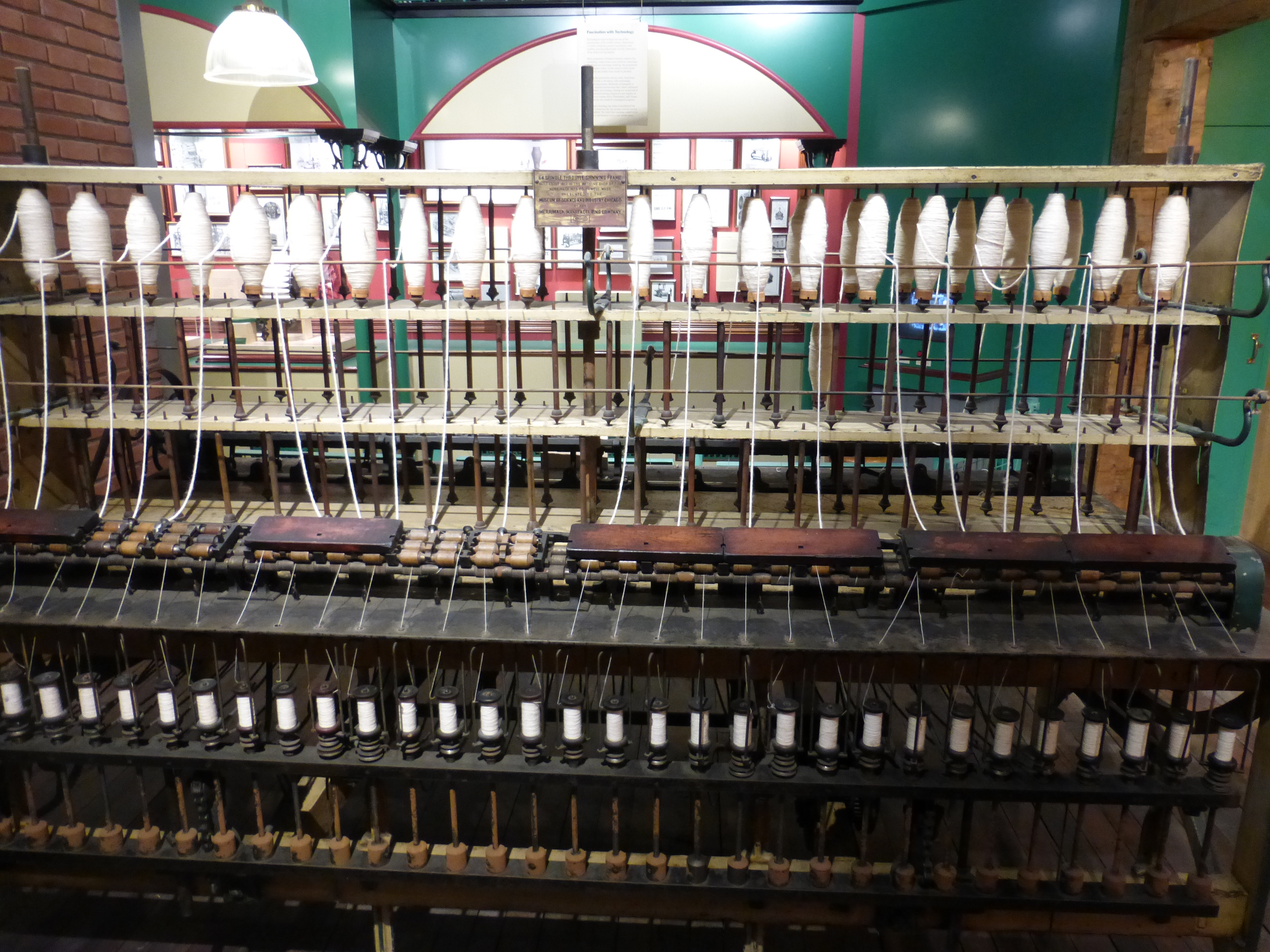
An early throstle frame in a US museum

The throstle frame was an early method of spinning yarn, and was a direct descendant of the spinning wheel. The rovings were attenuated by rollers as in the later ring frame. The thread was collected on free spinning spindles which had a flyer above which acted as the twisting mechanism. The flyer always maintains a uniform velocity, though the bobbin retarded by friction, is pulled around the spindle by the tension of the yarn allowing the variation needed to account for the increasing diameter. It was very suited to producing high quality yarn of the coarser counts.

== Life and work ==
Ellen Hooton was born in late 1822 or early 1823 in Wigan. In 1830 she started working in a throstle mill, owned by William Eccles. She didn't like it, was un-co-operative and repeatedly absconded and when the opportunity arose would steal money or other small items. Her mother had lied about her age to get her the job, Ellen would lie when questioned or surly, refuse to answer. Her mother took all her wages. She was not proud that she was earning a significant amount of money, or proud that of the financial interdependence in her family. Her relationship with her mother broke down, and her mother was prone to ask the overseer to help discipline her. Religion and the church were important at the time, and Ellen had never been into a chapel or church. She couldn't recite correctly the prayer that all children were expected to say as part of their bed-time ritual, it was over this that Ellen's mother asked the overseer to intervene. Ellen found the work difficult and she was unable to keep up.

Ellen was expected to work from 5.30 am till 8.00 pm in the mill. Her job entailed looking after half a frame of throstles, this would probably be 32 ends. As she started, an experienced tenter (spinning operative) would have worked the other half, and been on hand to help her. In time she would have taken over the entire frame, with a consequent wage rise. Later this may have increased to two frames- or more as she trained up another youngster. There are three parts to the job: piecing any broken rovings, rovings can break at any time. The two loose ends are twisted back together in a way that keeps lumps out of the yarn, it is best done by small young fingers rather than large old arthritic ones. The cops have to be creeled, and the new rovings threaded through the rollers and the flyer and secured to the bobbin. Taller workers find this task easy. Full bobbins have to be doffed and replaced with empty ones. The operative has a degree of control over the timing of these two latter tasks- and throughout the shift would try and balance the timing so roving bobbins did not all run out together, producing a smoother and less stressful work flow. Ellen complained to her mother that she couldn't do this and couldn't 'keep all her ends up'.

Ellen responded to the pressures by absconding, Mary responding by thinking Ellen was a bad child. (Note: In Contreast The Gentleman's Magazine 1785 had published a description of a good child: In the 1780s a nine-year-old girl's father, a coal miner, took her to work underground in the mine. There she worked dragging coal from the hewers to the surface. She and her seven-year-old brother earned seven shillings a week for their parents. Her father was subsequently killed in an accident. Her mother went insane with grief but the girl supported her and her other siblings with her earnings; at age fifteen she brought home 3s. 6d. a day by working a double shift underground.) Mary always returned Ellen to the mill where she would be punished. Mary sought the overseer to help her to discipline her child. She hoped he would act as a father figure. Mary felt she was out of control. While giving evidence to the examiner for the Central Board of His Majesty's Commissioners for inquiring into the Employment of Children in Factories, the overseer said:

Her mother has told me to take her to myself, and have her earnings, and keep her on bread and water, and put a lock of straw in one corner of the room for her to lie on.

Her mother, on cross examination said:

I told him to take her, and he might have her earnings, and let her lie in one corner of his room all night, to frighten her. I never said a lock of straw.

== Punishments ==
On one occasion, at the mothers request he beat Ellen. Elsewhere, overseers would beat children using rods and leather straps. kick them and slap them around the head with their fists.

On other occasions, probably five times or more Ellen was weighted down with mill weights attached to her back by straps of the style used in the mines and had an oversized cap placed on her head and made to parade through the factory carrying a stick. This was designed to humiliate her, and send a message to other children. During the punishment the other workers were allowed to poke, punch and hit her.

== Subsequent life ==
Ellen Hooton is not discussed in any literature subsequent to her appearance as witness at 10. Civil registration of births, marriages, and deaths in England and Wales was introduced on 1 July 1837. and a census taken every ten years since 1801. From these primary sources we can surmise that Ellen Hooton continued to work as a throstle spinner. She married Thomas Pye, a joiner in October 1841, giving her year of birth as 1821. They had a daughter Alice in 1845, but Ellen had died, (or left her family) by 1850. In 1851, her husband remarried. Alice herself married twice and died at the age of 30 in Chorley.

== See also ==
Robert Blincoe
Factory Acts
