= Mule scavenger =

Apprentice employment in cotton mills

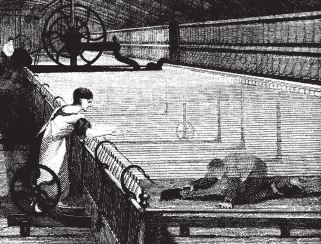
Part of an 1835 engraving showing a mule scavenger at work

Scavengers were employed in 18th and 19th century cotton mills, predominantly in the United Kingdom, to clean and recoup the area underneath a spinning mule. The cotton wastage that gathered on the floor was seen as too valuable for the owners to leave and one of the simplest solutions was to employ young children to work under the machinery. Many children suffered serious injuries while under the mules, with fingers, hands, and sometimes heads crushed by the heavy moving parts. Legislation introduced in 1819 tried to reduce working hours and improve conditions but there were still deaths recorded well beyond the middle of the 19th century.

== Job description ==
Scavengers were the lowliest of the apprentices at the cotton mills and had to endure the worst conditions. They were employed to work under the machinery to clean up the dust and oil and to gather the cotton that had been thrown off the mule by its intense vibrations. The tenters would not stop to allow the scavenger to work because they were paid by how much they could produce. As the mule moved forwards the children were sent under the machine, sweeping and gathering the cotton. They had to then time their retreat so as to not become entangled within the many moving parts. These children had started in the mills at around the age of four, working as scavengers until they were eight before progressing to the role of piecers. They worked 14 to 16 hours a day, beaten if they fell asleep, until they were 15.

== Danger ==
Mule sweeping is noted as being one of the worst occupations in history due to the work conditions. The danger of being beneath the machines meant that they had to constantly pay attention to its movements to avoid serious injury. An 1840 novel by Frances Trollope describes the work of a scavenger:

The miserable little creature... was a little girl about seven years old, whose office as "scavenger," was to collect incessantly from the machinery and from the floor, the flying fragments of cotton that might impede the work. In the performance of this duty, the child was obliged, from time to time, to stretch itself with sudden quickness on the ground, while the hissing machinery passed over her; and when this is skilfully done, and the head, body, and outstretched limbs carefully glued to the floor, the steady-moving, but threatening mass, may pass and repass over the dizzy head and trembling body without touching it. But accidents frequently occur; and many are the flaxen locks, rudely torn from infant heads, in the process.

— Frances Milton Trollope, The Life and Adventures of Michael Armstrong, the Factory Boy

While there were no requirements for factory owners to keep any records about the majority of accidents on their premises there are many anecdotal cases of scavengers suffering serious and sometimes fatal injuries. Some lost fingers or a hand, others are said to have been decapitated. A record held at the Quarry Bank Mill, now a museum, states:

On 6 March 1865 a very melancholy accident befell a lad named Joseph Foden about 13 years of age. While engaged sweeping under a Mule his head was caught between the Roller beam and the carriage – as the latter was putting up – and completely smashed, death being instantaneous.

Research by Jane Humphries, a professor of economic history at the University of Oxford, revealed that a mill near Cork had such a poor safety record that six people died and 60 others were mutilated over a four-year period. Robert Blincoe, a scavenger who went on to found his own cotton-spinning business, described the life of a child labourer in his book A Memoir of Robert Blincoe. He wrote about the mistreatment of workers at the cotton mills and the poor conditions that they had to endure. He claims that on one occasion he was nearly crushed by the machine and that, despite the injuries to his head, he was beaten for not completing the sweep in a single turn.

== Legislation ==
The children were sent to the mills of Derbyshire, Yorkshire and Lancashire from the workhouses in London and other towns and cities in the south of England. About half of the workers in Manchester and Stockport cotton factories surveyed in 1818 and 1819 had begun work at under ten years of age. Part of the Health and Morals of Apprentices Act 1802 was introduced to improve conditions for children, but it was not enough. In the Cotton Mills and Factories Act 1819 the law was updated to state that no children under the age of nine were to be employed and that children aged 9–16 years were limited to a maximum day of 16 hours. The law was difficult to enforce, but by 1835 the share of the workforce under 18 years of age in cotton mills in England and Scotland had fallen to 43%. Children were still working in cotton mills throughout the 19th century and, while numerous acts of Parliament were introduced to cut down the hours and improve conditions, those under the age of 14 were allowed to work in factories until the Education Act 1918 made attending school compulsory.
