= John Brown (historian) =

English writer (d. 1826?)

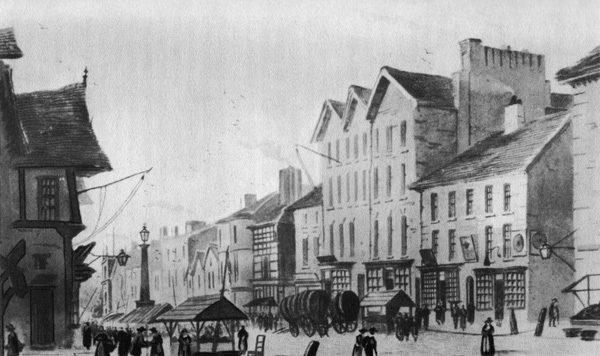
Bolton: Deansgate-Churchgate in 1838

John Brown (died c. 1829) was an English historian and miscellaneous writer. He laboured on a history of Bolton; went to London to advocate the claims of his friend, Samuel Crompton, the inventor; but committed suicide, seemingly in despair at his lack of success in life.

== Life ==
Brown was an inhabitant of Bolton in Lancashire, where during the early part of the nineteenth century he was engaged in miscellaneous literary work. Very little is known of his early life, except that he travelled widely in northern Europe and mixed in European politics. Drawing on his experiences, he wrote several works on international law, including Mysteries of Neutralization (1806). He showed a strong interest in European monarchs, and published Anecdotes and Characters of the House of Brunswick (1821) and Northern Courts (1818). He also compiled and edited The Historical Gallery of Criminal Portraitures, Foreign and Domestic (1823). While living in Bolton, he projected his History of Great and Little Bolton, of which seventeen numbers were published in Manchester between 1824 and 1825. This work begins with an Ancient History of Lancashire, which Brown maintained was peopled by colonists of a "German or Gothic" origin. His frequent visits to the west of Europe confirmed him, he said, in this belief.

At about this time, Brown became a close friend of the inventor Samuel Crompton, also a Bolton man. Laying aside his History of Bolton, he drew up The Basis of Mr. Samuel Crompton's Claims to a second Remuneration from Parliament for his Discovery of the Mule Spinning-machine (1825). Moving to London, Brown there prepared a memorial on this subject, dated May 1825, addressed to the Lords of the Treasury and signed by many inhabitants of Bolton, with a petition to the House of Commons (6 February 1826) on the part of Crompton, which briefly setd out the grounds of his claim. "There is abundant evidence", says G. J. French, the biographer of Crompton, "that Brown was indefatigable in his endeavours to procure a favourable consideration of Crompton's case from the government of the day". He was, however, completely unsuccessful, owing, as he wrote to Crompton, to secret opposition on the part of "your primitive enemy", as he called the first Sir Robert Peel. Further efforts were made useless by the death of Crompton in June 1827, and Brown did not long survive him. His life in the metropolis was in all ways unsuccessful, and in despair he committed suicide in his London lodgings, probably in 1829.

== Legacy ==
Brown's most memorable work, published after his death, was a biography of Robert Blincoe about the horrors of child labour in the cotton mills, entitled A Memoir of Robert Blincoe, an orphan boy sent from the workhouse of St. Pancras, London, at seven years of age to endure the horrors of a cotton mill. First published as a serial in Richard Carlile's The Lion in 1828, it was reprinted as a pamphlet later that year. In 1832 it was published as a book of sixty-two pages by the radical publisher John Doherty in Manchester. The publicity given to Blincoe's case later led to an invitation to him to give evidence at the 1833 royal commission on the employment of children.

== See also ==
- Samuel Crompton
- Robert Blincoe
