= Health and Morals of Apprentices Act 1802 =

Act of the Parliament of the United Kingdom concerning health and welfare

- Act of Parliament
- Parliament of the United Kingdom
- Long title: An Act for the preservation of the Health and Morals of Apprentices and others employed in Cotton and other Mills, and Cotton and other Factories
- Citation: 42 Geo. 3. c. 73
- Introduced by: Sir Robert Peel (Commons)
- Territorial extent: United Kingdom

Dates
- Royal assent: 22 June 1802
- Commencement: 2 December 1802 (Note: Section 1.)
- Repealed: 1 January 1879
Other legislation
Amended by	Statute Law Revision Act 1872
Repealed by	Factory and Workshop Act 1878
Relates to	Cotton Mills and Factories Act 1819; Cotton Mills, etc. Act 1825; Labour in Cotton Mills, etc. Act 1829; Labour in Cotton Mills, etc. (No. 2) Act 1829; Labour in Cotton Mills Act 1831; Labour of Children, etc., in Factories Act 1833

Status: Repealed

Text of statute as originally enacted

The Health and Morals of Apprentices Act 1802 (42 Geo. 3. c. 73), sometimes known as the Factory Act 1802, was an act of the Parliament of the United Kingdom designed to improve conditions for apprentices working in cotton mills. The act was introduced by Sir Robert Peel, who had become concerned with the issue after a 1784 outbreak of a "malignant fever" at one of his cotton mills, which he later blamed on 'gross mismanagement' by his subordinates.

The act required that cotton mills and factories be properly ventilated and basic requirements on cleanliness be met. Apprentices in these premises were to be given a basic education and to attend a religious service at least once a month. They were to be provided with clothing and their working hours were limited to no more than twelve hours a day (excluding meal breaks); they were not to work at night.

The act was not effectively enforced, and did not address the working conditions of 'free children' (children working in mills who were not apprentices) who rapidly came to heavily outnumber the apprentices. Regulating the way masters treated their apprentices was a recognised responsibility of Parliament and hence the act itself was non-contentious, but coming between employer and employee to specify on what terms a man might sell his labour (or that of his child) was highly contentious. Hence it was not until 1819 that an act to limit the hours of work (and set a minimum age) for 'free children' working in cotton mills was piloted through Parliament by Peel and his son Robert (the future Prime Minister). Strictly speaking, it is Peel's Cotton Mills and Factories Act 1819 (59 Geo. 3. c. 66) which (although also ineffective for want of a means of proper enforcement) paved the way for subsequent Factory Acts that would regulate the industry and set up effective means of regulation; but it is the Health and Morals of Apprentices Act 1802 which first recognised by legislation the evils of child labour in cotton mills that the Factory Acts addressed.

== Background ==
During the early Industrial Revolution in the United Kingdom, cotton mills were water-powered, and therefore sprang up where water power was available. When, as was often the case, there was no ready source of labour in the neighbourhood, the workforce had to be imported. A cheap and importable source of labour was 'parish apprentices' (pauper children, whose parish was supposed to see them trained to a trade or occupation); mill owners would reach agreement with distant parishes to employ, house and feed their apprentices. In 1800 there were 20,000 apprentices working in cotton mills. The apprentices were vulnerable to maltreatment by bad masters, to industrial accidents, to ill-health from their work, ill-health from overwork, and ill-health from contagious diseases such as smallpox, typhoid and typhus, which were then widespread. The enclosed conditions (to reduce the frequency of thread breakage, cotton mills were usually very warm and as draught-free as possible) and close contact within mills and factories allowed contagious diseases such as typhus and smallpox to spread rapidly. Typhoid (like cholera, which did not reach Europe until after the Napoleonic wars) is spread not by poor working conditions but by poor sanitation, but sanitation in mills and the settlements round them often was poor.

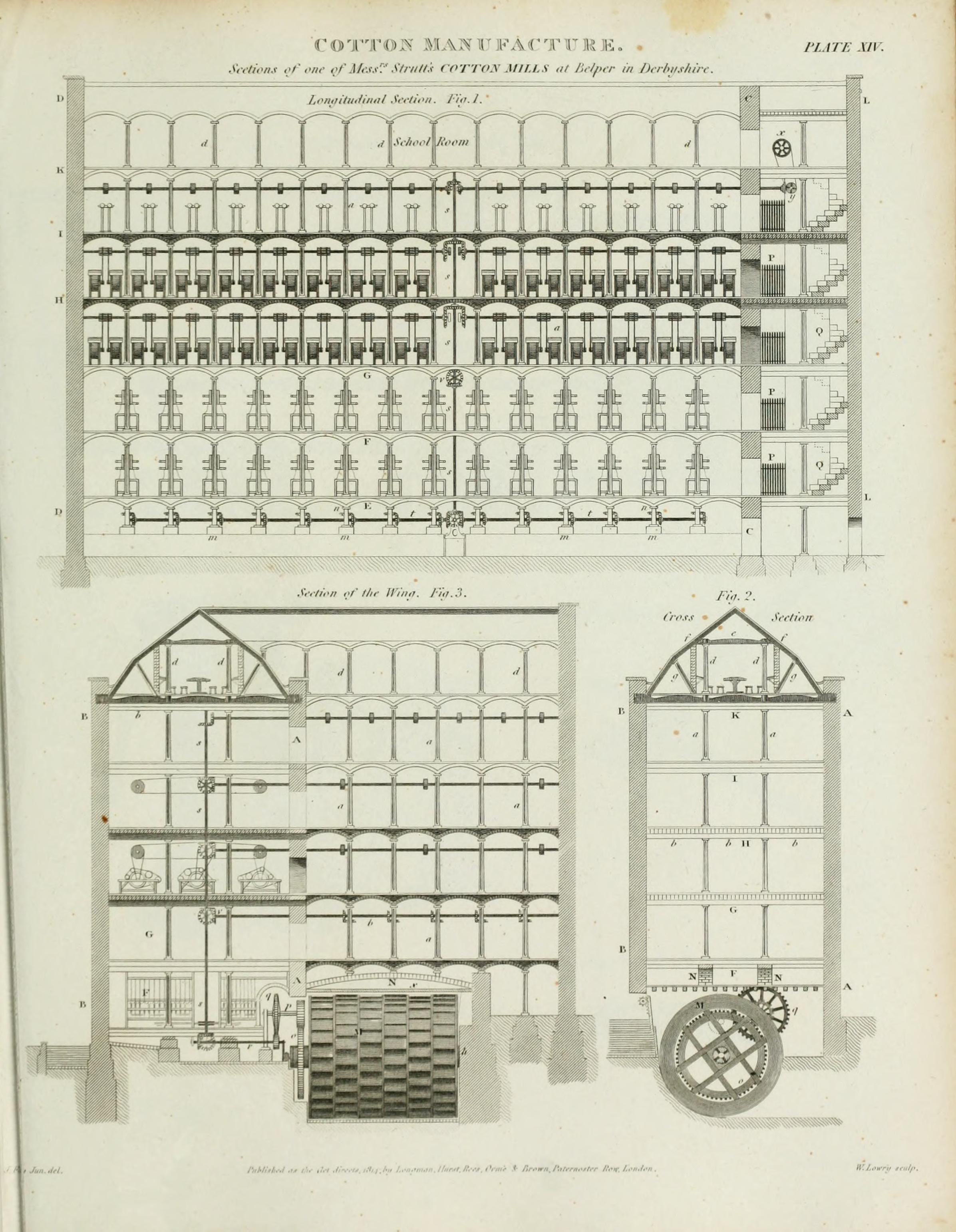
Elevations of a large water-powered cotton mill (Note: Jedediah Strutt's North Mill at Belper, Derbyshire, built 1804. illustration from Rees' Cyclopedia, 1819)

In about 1780 a water-powered cotton mill was built for Robert Peel on the River Irwell near Radcliffe; the mill employed child labour bought from workhouses in Birmingham and London. Children were unpaid and bound apprentice until they were 21. They boarded on an upper floor of the building, and were locked in. Shifts were typically 10–10 1/2 hours in length (i.e. 12 hours after allowing for meal breaks), and the apprentices 'hot bunked': a child who had just finished his shift would sleep in a bed only just vacated by a child now just starting his shift. Peel himself admitted that conditions at the mill were "very bad".

In 1784 it was brought to the attention of the magistrates of the Salford Hundred that an outbreak of "low, putrid fever, of a contagious nature" had "prevailed many months in the cotton mills and among the poor, in the township of Radcliffe". The doctors of Manchester, led by Dr Thomas Percival were commissioned to investigate the cause of the fever and to recommend how to prevent its spread. They could not identify the cause, and their recommendations were largely driven by the contemporary view that fevers were spread by putrid atmospheres and hence were to be combatted by removing smells and improving ventilation:

- Windows and doors should be left open every night and during the lunch break : when the mill was running as many windows as possible were to be left open. (Natural ventilation was poor because there were too few opening lights in the mill windows, and they were all at the same height (too high).
- The stoves currently used for heating did not give much airflow. Chimneys should be built in each work room and turf fires lit in them to give better ventilation and combat contagion by their "strong, penetrating, and pungent" smoke.
- Rooms should be swept daily and floors washed with lime water once a week. The walls and ceilings should also be whitewashed two or three times a year.
- The apartments should be fumigated weekly with tobacco.
- Privies should be washed daily and ventilated to ensure that the smell did not permeate to the work rooms.
- Rancid oil used to lubricate machinery should be replaced with purer oil.
- To prevent contagion and to preserve health, all employees should be involved in keeping the factory clean. Children should bathe occasionally. The clothes of those infected with fever should be washed in cold water, then in hot and be left to fumigate before being worn again. Those who died of fever should be wrapped promptly in cloth and those in the vicinity advised to smoke tobacco to avoid infection.

The last recommendation expressed a much wider concern about the welfare of mill children:

We earnestly recommend a longer recess from labour at noon, and a more early dismission from it in the evening, to all those who work in the cotton mills: but we deem this indulgence essential to the present health, and future capacity for labour, of those who are under the age of fourteen; for the active recreations of childhood and youth are necessary to the growth, vigour, and the right conformation of the human body. And we cannot excuse ourselves, on the present occasion, from suggesting to you, who are the guardians of the public weal, this further very important consideration, that the rising generation should not be debarred from all opportunities of instruction at the only season of life in which they can be properly improved.

As a result of this report the magistrates decided not to allow parish apprentices to be indentured to cotton mills where they worked at night or more than ten hours in the day. Conditions at the Radcliffe mill were improved; in 1795 John Aikin's A Description of the Country from thirty to forty miles round Manchester said of Peel's mills:

"The peculiar healthiness of-the people employed may be imputed partly to the judicious and humane regulations put in practice by Mr. Peel, and partly to the salubrity of the air and climate."

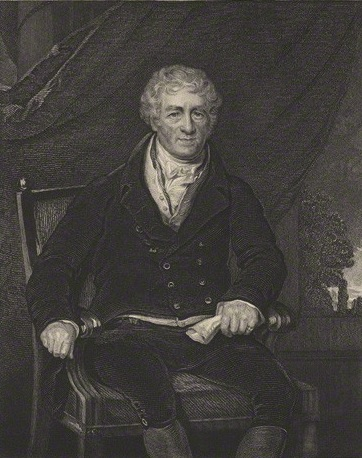
Sir Robert Peel

=== Peel introduces his bill ===
In 1795, the medical men of Manchester (with Percival playing a leading part) formed the Manchester Board of Health, which promptly investigated the employment of children in Manchester factories, taking evidence from (amongst others) Peel now MP for Tamworth. The board concluded:

1. It appears that the children and others who work in the large cotton factories, are peculiarly disposed to be affected by the contagion of fever, and that when such infection is received, it is rapidly propagated, not only amongst those who are crowded together in the same apartments, but in the families and neighbourhoods to which they belong.
2. The large factories are generally injurious to the constitution of those employed in them, even where no particular diseases prevail, from the close confinement which is enjoined, from the debilitating effects of hot or impure air, and from the want of the active exercises which nature points out as essential in childhood and youth to invigorate the system, and to fit our species for the employments and for the duties of manhood.
3. The untimely labour of the night, and the protracted labour of the day, with respect to children, not only tends to diminish future expectations as to the general sum of life and industry, by impairing the strength and destroying the vital stamina of the rising generation, but it too often gives encouragement to idleness, extravagance and profligacy in the parents, who, contrary to the order of nature, subsist by the oppression of their offspring.
4. It appears that the children employed in factories are generally debarred from all opportunities of education, and from moral or religious instruction.
5. From the excellent regulations which subsist in several cotton factories, it appears that many of these evils may be in a considerable degree obviated; we are therefore warranted by experience, and are assured, we shall have the support of the liberal proprietors of these factories in proposing an application for parliamentary aid (if other methods appear not likely to effect the purpose) to establish a general system of laws for the wise, humane and equal government of all such works."

Peel (presumably one of the liberal proprietors with excellent regulations who assured his support) introduced his bill in 1802. In doing so Peel said that he was convinced of the existence of gross mismanagement in his own factories, and having no time to set them in order himself, was getting an act of Parliament passed to do it for him but (given his dealings with the Manchester Board of Health) this may well have been a pleasantry, rather than the whole truth. In 1816 Peel introduced a further Factory Bill; his explanation to the consequent select committee of the need for further legislation included this account of the origins of the 1802 act:

The house in which I have a concern gave employment at one time to near one thousand children of this description. Having other pursuits, it was not often in my power to visit the factories, but whenever such visits were made, I was struck with the uniform appearance of bad health, and, in many cases, stinted growth of the children; the hours of labour were regulated by the interest of the overseer, whose remuneration depending on the quantity of the work done, he was often induced to make the poor children work excessive hours, and to stop their complaints by trifling bribes. Finding our own factories under such management, and learning that the like practices prevailed in other parts of the kingdom where similar machinery was in use, the children being much over-worked, and often little or no regard paid to cleanliness and ventilation of the buildings; having the assistance of Dr Percival and other eminent medical gentlemen of Manchester, together with some distinguished characters both in and out of Parliament, I brought in a Bill in the 42nd year of the King, for the regulation of such parish apprentices. The hours of work allowed by that Bill being fewer in number than those formerly practised, a visible improvement in the health and general appearance of the children soon became evident, and since the complete operation of the act contagious diseases have rarely occurred.

The act met little opposition in Parliament, although there was discussion as to whether it should be extended to all manufactories and all workers. The amendment was dismissed as the act only served to ensure education for apprentices not to improve conditions in factories.

== Provisions ==
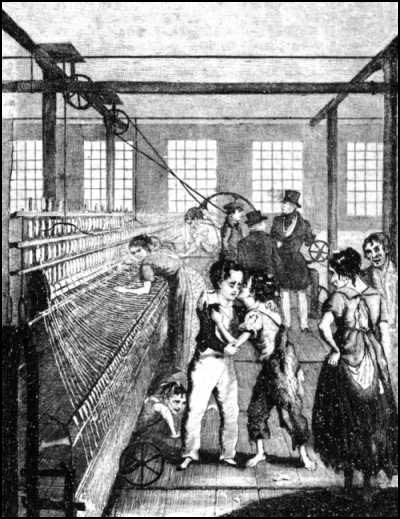
Child apprentices in a cotton mill (Note: An illustration to an 1840 novel - not very realistic (a touching meeting between brothers is -unwisely- taking place within the floorspace swept out by the mule (see video))and the depiction of the machinery is distorted to fit the portrait format - cf "Mule spinning at Swainson & Birley Cotton Mill, near Preston, Lancashire, 1835". Note the child crawling out from under the machinery: he is a scavenger and his job is to clear away dirt and cotton waste that might foul the machinery or get caught in the threads, and to do so while the mule is moving Mule spinning in action (at Quarry Bank Mill))

Under the act, regulations and rules came into force on 2 December 1802 and applied to all mills and factories employing three or more apprentices (unless the total workforce was less than twenty). It stated that all mills and factories should be cleaned at least twice yearly with quicklime and water; this included ceilings and walls. There was a requirement that the buildings have sufficient windows and openings for ventilation.

Each apprentice was to be given two sets of clothing, suitable linen, stockings, hats, and shoes, and a new set each year thereafter. Working hours were limited to 12 hours a day, excluding the time taken for breaks. Apprentices were no longer permitted to work during the night (between 9 pm and 6 am). A grace period was provided to allow factories time to adjust, but all night-time working by apprentices was to be discontinued by June 1804.

All apprentices were to be educated in reading, writing and arithmetic for the first four years of their apprenticeship. The act specified that this should be done every working day within usual working hours but did not state how much time should be set aside for it. Educational classes should be held in a part of the mill or factory designed for the purpose. Every Sunday, for one hour, apprentices were to be taught the Christian religion; every other Sunday, a divine service should be held in the factory, and every month the apprentices should visit a church. They should be prepared for confirmation in the Church of England between the ages of 14 and 18 and must be examined by a clergyman at least once a year. Male and female apprentices were to sleep separately and not more than two per bed.

Local magistrates had to appoint two inspectors known as visitors to ensure that factories and mills were complying with the act; one was to be a clergyman and the other a Justice of the Peace, neither to have any connection with the mill or factory. The visitors had the power to impose fines for non-compliance and the authority to visit at any time of the day to inspect the premises.

The act was to be displayed in two places in the factory. Owners who refused to comply with any part of the act could be fined between £2 and £5. (Note: Comparing average earnings between 1802 and 2013, the modern equivalent is about £1,900 to £4,750, according to MeasuringWorth.com. Comparison with millowners' potential profits and personal wealth is perhaps more relevant; when Peel built his Radcliffe mill, Richard Arkwright's annual profits were about £40,000: in 1802 Peel donated £1,000 to a Manchester benevolent society; despite Robert Owen holding the most enlightened principles (in 1798 the New Lanark mills employed 500 poorhouse children from Edinburgh mostly aged between five and eight working 13 hours/day (including 90 minutes for mealbreaks) with 2 hours schooling after work: Owen moved to a 12-hour day (including 75 minutes mealbreaks) and did not employ children under ten), New Lanark made a total profit of about £220,000 between 1799 and 1813)

== Effect of the act ==
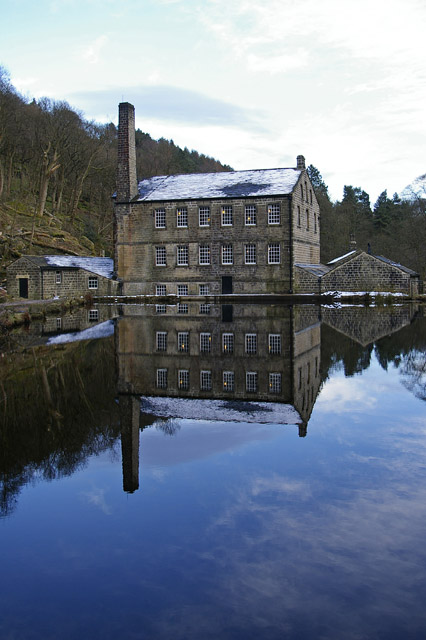
A small water-powered cotton mill and its power source (Note: Gibson (or Lord Holme) Mill at Hardcastle Crags near Hebden Bridge. Built 1800. In 1833, 21 workers were employed in the building, each working an average 72 hours per week.)

The act required magistrates to appoint visitors, whom it empowered to inspect mills and report on their findings, but it did not require them to exercise their powers. Consequently, unless local magistrates were particularly interested in the issue, the act was poorly enforced. Where factories were inspected, the visitors were amateurs (as indeed they were) in comparison to the paid Factory Inspectorate set up by the 1833 Act. Furthermore, the act applied only to apprentices, and not to 'free children' whose fathers' right to dispose of their children's labour on whatever terms they chose were unaffected by the act. Improvements in the generation of rotary motion by steam engines made steam-powered cotton mills a practical proposition; they were already operating in Manchester in 1795, using free children drawn from the local population. The great advantage parish apprentices had had was that they were tied to the mill, no matter how remote the mill had to be to avail itself of water power. If the mill no longer had to be remote, it became a problem that the mill was tied to the apprentices. Apprentices had to be housed clothed and fed whether or not the mill could sell what they produced; they were in competition with free children whose wages would fall if the mill went on short time (and might not reflect the full cost of housing clothing and feeding them, since that was incurred whether they were working or not) and who could be discharged if sick, injured or otherwise incapable of work. Consequently, the use of free children came to predominate: the act became largely a dead letter within its limited scope, and inapplicable to most factory children.

In 1819, when Peel introduced a Bill to introduce an eleven-hour day for all children under 16 working in cotton mills, a Lords Committee heard evidence from a Bolton magistrate who had investigated 29 local cotton mills; 20 had no apprentices but employed a total of 550 children under 14; the other nine mills employed a total of 98 apprentices, and a total of 350 children under 14. Apprentices were mostly found in the larger mills, which had somewhat better conditions; some even worked a 12-hour day or less (the Grant brothers' mill at Tottington worked an 11.5-hour day: "This establishment has perfect ventilation; all the apprentices, and in fact all the children, are healthy, happy, clean, and well clothed; proper and daily attention is paid to their instruction; and they regularly attend divine worship on Sundays."): in other mills children worked up to 15 hours a day in bad conditions (e.g. Gorton and Roberts' Elton mill: "Most filthy; no ventilation; the apprentices and other children ragged, puny, not half clothed, and seemingly not half fed; no instruction of any sort; no human beings can be more wretched").

Although the act was largely ineffective, it has been seen as the first piece of Health & Safety legislation, leading the way to subsequent regulations covering industrial workplaces; its requirement for factory walls to be whitewashed continued to be a legal requirement until the Factories Act 1961. (Note: Even now the 1802 Act can be seen behind the revised requirements of the 1961 Factories Act, which (except where less than 10 people are employed, and no powered machinery used (section 1(4)) states (section 1(3)):... the following provisions shall apply as respects all inside walls and partitions and all ceilings or tops of rooms, and all walls, sides and tops of passages and staircases, that is to say,— (a)where they have a smooth impervious surface, they shall at least once in every period of fourteen months be washed with hot water and soap or other suitable detergent or cleaned by such other method as may be approved by the inspector for the district; (b)where they are kept painted in a prescribed manner or varnished, they shall be repainted in a prescribed manner or revarnished at such intervals of not more than seven years as may be prescribed, and shall at least once in every period of fourteen months be washed with hot water and soap or other suitable detergent or cleaned by such other method as may be approved by the inspector for the district; (c)in any other case they shall be kept whitewashed or colourwashed and the whitewashing or colourwashing shall be repeated at least once in every period of fourteen months.)

Opinions differ as to the deeper significance of the act. Some scholars have linked the act to a move away from laissez-faire capitalism, or see it as marking the point where the state began to recognise its responsibility for very poor children, and to address the conditions in which they were living; it has also been seen as presaging subsequent legislation regarding the health of towns. Others see it as at heart one of the last manifestations of the old Elizabethan Poor Relief Act 1601 (43 Eliz. 1. c. 2), which directed that destitute children should be apprenticed in a trade; (more accurately of the Statute of Artificers of 1562 which set up systems for regulating apprenticeships): during Parliamentary debates on the Bill that interpretation was successfully urged against any attempt to widen its applicability.

== Subsequent developments ==
The whole act was repealed by section 107 of, and the seventh schedule to, the Factory and Workshop Act 1878 (41 & 42 Vict. c. 16), which came into force on 1 January 1879.

== Bibliography ==
- Augusta, Anna; Ramsay, Whittall (1969). Sir Robert Peel. Ayer Publishing. ISBN 0-8369-5076-3.
- Hurd, Douglas (2007). Robert Peel: A Biography. Weidenfeld & Nicolson. ISBN 978-0-297-84844-8.
- Hutchins, B. L.; Harrison, A. (1911). A History of Factory Legislation. P. S. King & Son.
- Simmons, James, R. (2007). Factory Lives: Four Nineteenth-Century Working-Class Autobiographies. Broadview Press. ISBN 978-1-55111-272-5.
