= Robert Blincoe =

British child labourer and autobiographer (c. 1792–1860)

Robert Blincoe (c. 1792–1860) was an English author and former child labourer. He became famous during the 1830s for his popular autobiography, A Memoir of Robert Blincoe, an account of his childhood spent in a workhouse. However, there are some doubts about whether this detailed observation of Blincoe's early life can be considered autobiography.

== Early life ==
Robert Blincoe was born around 1792. By 1796, he was an orphan and living in the St Pancras workhouse in London. His parents are unknown.

In August 1799, at the age of seven, he was apprenticed to work as a mule scavenger in the Gonalston Mill, a cotton mill of C.W. and F. Lambert in Lowdham, near Nottingham. According to his memoirs, he was one of the 80 seven-year-old children the St Pancras workhouse indentured as parish apprentices. They travelled there in wagons for five days. Under the terms of their indenture, the boys were to be taught to make hosiery, and the girls lace making in the last year of their apprenticeships, but that never happened.

Blincoe and the others lived in a dormitory, and their food consisted of porridge and black bread. They worked 14 hours a day, six days a week. Blincoe's first job was as a mule scavenger, picking up loose cotton waste from the spinning frames when the machine was working, even in the face of injury. He lost half a finger. Overseers beat the children on the slightest provocation. Blincoe later stated that he contemplated suicide many times. When Blincoe ran away and tried to flee to London, a tailor who sometimes worked for the mill recognised him and dragged him back.

In 1802, when Lowdham Mill was closed, Blincoe and others were sent to Litton Mill in Derbyshire. Treatment remained the same.

== Later life ==
Blincoe completed his effective apprenticeship in stocking weaving in 1813 and worked as an adult worker until 1817. He then left to found his own waste cotton supply business. In 1819, he married a woman named Martha. They had three children. He sold his waste cotton business to get into spinning cotton.

== Memoirs and financial failure ==
In 1822, journalist John Brown met Blincoe and interviewed him for an article about child labour. Brown decided to write Blincoe's biography and gave it to social activist Richard Carlile. In 1828, Carlile decided to publish the tale in his newspaper The Lion in five weekly episodes between 25 January and 22 February and The Poor Man's Advocate. The book exposed the poor conditions in the cotton mills, and just after the reprint in 1832, the government investigated the mills.

Blincoe's spinning machinery was destroyed in a fire in 1828. Destitute and unable to pay his debts, he was imprisoned in Lancaster Castle for some time. After his release, he became a cotton-waste dealer. This business was finally successful, and he was able to pay for his three children's education.

In 1832, John Doherty published A Memoir of Robert Blincoe in a pamphlet form.

== Death and legacy ==
In 1833 Blincoe was questioned by Dr. Francis Bisset Hawkins for the commission on the employment of children in factories. He spoke about the impact on his health of working in a cotton mill from the age of 7, and described physical punishments suffered by children working in factories. He also stated that he'd rather see his children transported to Australia than put them to work in factories. When giving evidence, he mentioned his Memoir, which was included in the commission's report as a result.

Blincoe died of bronchitis in his daughter's house in 1860.

According to John Waller, in his book The Real Oliver Twist, Blincoe's life story was told to the writer John Brown, who wrote the manuscript of a biography of Blincoe before committing suicide later the same year. But Brown had given his manuscript to a friend, Richard Carlile, who published the resulting book, A Memoir of Robert Blincoe, in five episodes in his magazine The Lion in 1832.

A book by Nicholas Blincoe, Oliver Twist & Me: The True Story of my Family and Charles Dickens's best-loved novel, was published in September 2025. It details the connections between Robert Blincoe, Oliver Twist and Charles Dickens.

== See also ==
- Ellen Hooton
- Litton Mill

== Books and references ==
- Waller, John (2005). The Real Oliver Twist: Robert Blincoe: A Life That Illuminates an Age. Thriplow, Cambridge: Icon Books. ISBN 978-1-84046-727-7. OCLC 191662455.
