= Factory Acts =

UK laws on employment

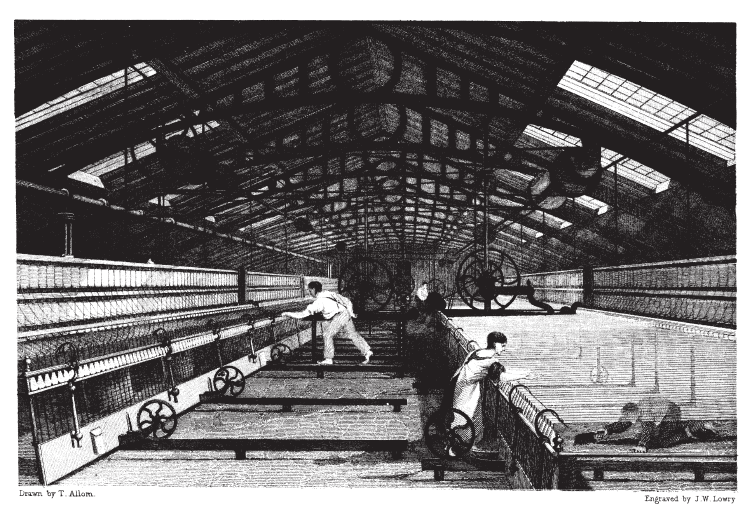
Children at work in a cotton mill (mule spinning), England, 1835 (Note: On the left an (expensive) adult male – on the left a female "piecer" (mending broken threads) and a "scavenger" (sweeping up debris before it can contaminate the threads). The children may be drawn to look older than in real life: the scavenger looks a bit too big/old for the job.)

The Factory Acts were a series of acts passed by the Parliament of the United Kingdom beginning in 1802 to regulate and improve the conditions of industrial employment. The early acts concentrated on regulating the hours of work and moral welfare of young children employed in cotton mills but were effectively unenforced until the Labour of Children, etc., in Factories Act 1833 (3 & 4 Will. 4. c. 103) established a professional Factory Inspectorate. The regulation of working hours was then extended to women by an act of Parliament in 1844.

The Factories Act 1847 (10 & 11 Vict. c. 29) (known as the Ten Hour Act), together with acts in 1850 and 1853 remedying defects in the 1847 act, met a long-standing and well-organised demand by the millworkers for a ten-hour day. The Factory Acts also included regulations for ventilation, hygienic practices, and machinery guarding in an effort to improve the working circumstances for mill children. Introduction of the ten-hour day proved to have none of the dire consequences predicted by its opponents, and its apparent success effectively ended theoretical objections to the principle of factory legislation; from the 1860s onwards more industries were brought within the Factory Acts.

== Activists promoting the Factory Acts ==
The leading humanitarian reformers and MPs included Anthony Ashley-Cooper, 7th Earl of Shaftesbury. He led the "Ten-Hour Movement" and was a key parliamentary advocate for factory reform, especially for limiting child labour. He was a Tory MP until 1851 when he inherited the earldom and entered the House of Lords. He was a national leader of the evangelical wing of the Church of England. Michael Sadler was a prominent Tory MP whose Sadler report of 1832 championed factory legislation to protect children and improve working conditions. Richard Oastler, another Tory, was a passionate campaigner outside Parliament, known for his powerful rhetoric and advocacy for the ten-hour workday, which he presented with evangelical fervour derived from his Methodist background and his opposition to all forms of slavery.

Many supporters like Shaftsbury Sadler and Oastler were motivated by Christian humanitarianism, especially evangelical Anglicans and Quakers. Their religious beliefs drove them to seek better treatment for factory workers, especially children. A minority of factory owners supported the acts, usually men with strong religious convictions such as John Fielden, a Methodist. Most of the opposition came from factory owners who also strongly opposed trade unions. They believed in laissez-faire economics, arguing that market forces should regulate labour conditions. They feared that shorter hours would reduce profits, lower productivity, and make them less competitive.

In 1830 Oastler published a dramatic open letter in the Leeds Mercury newspaper, exposing the terrible working conditions in Bradford factories. He escalated the rhetoric by saying the local child laborers were worse off than slaves on distant sugar plantations. Sadler’s Report of 1832 included explicit testimonies describing very bad conditions for women and children. The report shocked public opinion and calls were made to imprison, flog and pillory recalcitrant factory owners. One historian says the angry reformers were "moral rather than analytical, passionate rather than sober, abusive rather than conciliatory." Then Shaftesbury took over leadership of the momentum in favour of factory reform in Parliament. He organised campaigns that achieved new laws with inspectors to identify and force reforms in the long run.

== Health and Morals of Apprentices Act 1802 ==
The Health and Morals of Apprentices Act 1802 (42 Geo. 3. c. 73) was introduced by Sir Robert Peel; it addressed concerns felt by the medical men of Manchester about the health and welfare of children employed in cotton mills, and first expressed by them in 1784 in a report on an outbreak of 'putrid fever' at a mill at Radcliffe owned by Peel. Although the act included some hygiene requirements for all textile mills, it was largely concerned with the employment of apprentices; it left the employment of 'free' (non-indentured) children unregulated.

It allowed (but did not require) local magistrates to enforce compliance with its requirements, and therefore went largely unenforced. As the first attempt to improve the lot of factory children, it is often seen as paving the way for future Factory Acts. At best, it only partially paved the way; its restriction to apprentices (where there was a long tradition of legislation) meant that it was left to later Factory Acts to establish the principle of intervention by Parliament on humanitarian grounds on worker welfare issues against the "laissez-faire" political and economic orthodoxy of the age which held that to be ill-advised.

Under the act, regulations and rules came into force on 2 December 1802 and applied to all textile mills and factories employing three or more apprentices or twenty employees. The buildings must have sufficient windows and openings for ventilation, and should be cleaned at least twice yearly with quicklime and water; this included ceilings and walls. Each apprentice was to be given two sets of clothing, suitable linen, stockings, hats, and shoes, and a new set each year thereafter. Apprentices could not work during the night (between 9 pm and 6 am), and their working hours could not exceed 12 hours a day, excluding the time taken for breaks. A grace period was provided to allow factories time to adjust, but all night-time working by apprentices was to be discontinued by June 1804.

All apprentices were to be educated in reading, writing and arithmetic for the first four years of their apprenticeship. The act specified that this should be done every working day within usual working hours but did not state how much time should be set aside for it. Educational classes should be held in a part of the mill or factory designed for the purpose. Every Sunday, for one hour, apprentices were to be taught the Christian religion; every other Sunday, divine service should be held in the factory, and every month the apprentices should visit a church. They should be prepared for confirmation in the Church of England between the ages of 14 and 18 and must be examined by a clergyman at least once a year. Male and female apprentices were to sleep separately and not more than two per bed.

Local magistrates had to appoint two inspectors known as 'visitors' to ensure that factories and mills were complying with the act; one was to be a clergyman and the other a justice of the peace, neither to have any connection with the mill or factory. The visitors had the power to impose fines for non-compliance and the authority to visit at any time of the day to inspect the premises. The act was to be displayed in two places in the factory. Owners who refused to comply with any part of the act could be fined between £2 and £5.

== Cotton Mills and Factories Act 1819 ==
The Cotton Mills and Factories Act 1819 (59 Geo. 3. c. 66) stated that no children under 9 were to be employed and that children aged 9–16 years were limited to 12 hours' work per day. It applied to the cotton industry only, but covered all children, whether apprentices or not. It was seen through Parliament by Sir Robert Peel; it had its origins in a draft prepared by Robert Owen in 1815 but the act that emerged in 1819 was much watered-down from Owen's draft. It was also effectively unenforceable; enforcement was left to local magistrates, but they could only inspect a mill if two witnesses had given sworn statements that the mill was breaking the act. An amending act, the Labour in Cotton Mills, etc. Act 1819 (60 Geo. 3 & 1 Geo. 4. c. 5) was passed in December 1819. When any accident disabled a factory (as had just happened at New Lanark), night working in the rest of the works by those who had previously worked in the affected factory was permitted until the accident was made good.

== Cotton Mills, etc. Act 1825 ==
Cotton Mills, etc. Act 1825
- Act of Parliament
- Parliament of the United Kingdom
- Long title: An Act to make further Provisions for the Regulation of Cotton Mills and Factories, and for the better Preservation of the Health of young Persons employed therein.
- Citation: 6 Geo. 4. c. 63
- Territorial extent: United Kingdom

Dates
- Royal assent: 22 June 1825
- Commencement: 1 August 1825 (Note: Section 1.)
- Repealed: 1 November 1831
Other legislation
Amended by	Labour in Cotton Mills, etc. Act 1829
Repealed by	Labour in Cotton Mills Act 1831
Relates to	Health and Morals of Apprentices Act 1802; Cotton Mills and Factories Act 1819; Labour in Cotton Mills, etc. Act 1829; Labour in Cotton Mills, etc. (No. 2) Act 1829

Status: Repealed

Text of statute as originally enacted

'A large manufactory' : the (water-powered) mill complex at Darley Abbey viewed end-on

In 1825 John Cam Hobhouse introduced a bill to allow magistrates to act on their own initiative, and to compel witnesses to attend hearings; noting that so far there had been only two prosecutions under the Cotton Mills and Factories Act 1819 (59 Geo. 3. c. 66). Opposing the bill, a millowner MP (Note: George Philips; "the Member for Manchester" in fact MP for Wootton Bassett but his mill was in Salford and his business interests in Manchester) agreed that the 1819 bill was widely evaded, but went on to remark that this put millowners at the mercy of millhands "The provisions of Sir Robert Peel's act had been evaded in many respects: and it was now in the power of the workmen to ruin many individuals, by enforcing the penalties for children working beyond the hours limited by that act" and that this showed to him that the best course of action was to repeal the 1819 act. On the other hand, another millowner MP (Note: William Evans, MP for East Retford; he and his step-father had a variety of commercial interests in Derbyshire, including large water-powered mills at Darley Abbey on the Derbyshire Derwent) supported Hobhouse's bill saying that he

agreed that, the bill was loudly called for, and, as the proprietor of a large manufactory, admitted that there was much that required remedy. He doubted whether shortening the hours of work would be injurious even to the interests of the manufacturers; as the children would be able, while they were employed, to pursue their occupation with greater vigour and activity. At the same time, there was nothing to warrant a comparison with the condition of the negroes in the West Indies.

The Cotton Mills and Factories Act 1819 (59 Geo. 3. c. 66) act had specified that a meal break of an hour should be taken between 11 a.m. and 2 p.m. A subsequent act, the Labour in Cotton Mills, etc. Act 1819 (60 Geo. 3 & 1 Geo. 4. c. 5), allowing water-powered mills to exceed the specified hours in order to make up for lost time, widened the limits to 11 a.m. to 4 p.m. Hobhouse's bill also sought to limit hours worked to eleven a day; the act as passed, the Cotton Mills, etc. Act 1825 (6 Geo. 4. c. 63), improved the arrangements for enforcement, but kept a twelve-hour day Monday-Friday with a shorter day of nine hours on Saturday. Hobhouse's act set the limits to 11 a.m. to 3 p.m. A parent's assertion of a child's age was sufficient, and relieved employers of any liability should the child in fact be younger. JPs who were millowners or the fathers or sons of millowners could not hear complaints under the act.

== Labour in Cotton Mills, etc. Act 1829 ==
Labour in Cotton Mills, etc. Act 1829
- Act of Parliament
- Parliament of the United Kingdom
- Long title: An Act to amend the Law relating to the Employment of Children in Cotton Mills and Factories.
- Citation: 10 Geo. 4. c. 51
- Territorial extent: United Kingdom

Dates
- Royal assent: 19 June 1829
- Commencement: 19 June 1829 (Note: The Acts of Parliament (Commencement) Act 1793.)
- Repealed: 1 November 1831
Other legislation
Amends	Cotton Mills, etc. Act 1825
Amended by	Labour in Cotton Mills, etc. (No. 2) Act 1829
Repealed by	Labour in Cotton Mills Act 1831
Relates to	Health and Morals of Apprentices Act 1802; Cotton Mills and Factories Act 1819; Cotton Mills, etc. Act 1825; Labour in Cotton Mills, etc. (No. 2) Act 1829

Status: Repealed

Text of statute as originally enacted

Labour in Cotton Mills, etc. (No. 2) Act 1829
- Act of Parliament
- Parliament of the United Kingdom
- Long title: An Act to render valid an Act to amend the Law relating to the Employment of Children in Cotton Mills and Factories.
- Citation: 10 Geo. 4. c. 63
- Territorial extent: United Kingdom

Dates
- Royal assent: 24 June 1829
- Commencement: 24 June 1829
- Repealed: 1 November 1831
Other legislation
Amends	Labour in Cotton Mills, etc. Act 1829
Repealed by	Labour in Cotton Mills Act 1831
Relates to	Health and Morals of Apprentices Act 1802; Cotton Mills and Factories Act 1819; Cotton Mills, etc. Act 1825; Labour in Cotton Mills, etc. Act 1829

Status: Repealed

Text of statute as originally enacted

In 1829, Parliament passed the Labour in Cotton Mills, etc. Act 1829 (10 Geo. 4. c. 63), which relaxed formal requirements for the service of legal documents on millowners (documents no longer had to specify all partners in the concern owning or running the mill; it would be adequate to identify the mill by the name by which it was generally known). The bill passed the Commons but was subject to a minor textual amendment by the Lords (adding the words "to include" (Note: To make a list indicative, rather than prescriptive; a prudent amendment and not as trivial as it sounds. An Elizabethan parliament, feeling that nobody should take up a trade without having served an apprenticeship, passed a law to that effect. However, since the law listed the trades then practised, without any preceding 'to include', the act was subsequently held to cover only the trades it listed: trades which developed subsequently did not (legally) require an apprenticeship. Adam Smith in Wealth of Nations mocked the consequent illogicality.)) and then received royal assent without the Commons first being made aware of (or agreeing to) the Lords' amendment. To rectify this inadvertent breach of privilege, a further act (making no other change to the act already passed) was promptly passed on the last day of the parliamentary session. (Note: Unfortunately Hansard for 1829 is not accessible online; nor do Hutchins and Harrison appear to take any notice of these very minor bits of factory legislation. The necessary trawl through contemporary newspapers for 1829 throws up some interesting straws in the wind on the spirit of the age: two very young children accidentally locked in a Bolton cotton mill over the weekend (Lancaster Gazette, 13 June 1829) were there from 5 p.m. Saturday to 5 a.m. Monday, and a millowner working a nine-year-old more than twelve hours was fined £20 thanks to a prosecution at Stockport brought by a member of a society for enforcing the provisions of the 1825 act ('Overworking Children in Cotton Factories' Manchester Times 25 April 1829). The same prosecutor had less success with a later prosecution at Macclesfield ('Overworking Children and Paying in Goods' Manchester Times 15 August 1849) (but if laws are passed to change behaviours not to punish wrongdoers the Truck Act action was successful: the millowner having been found not guilty (on a defence that his tokens could be exchanged for legal tender at face value at the company shop) promised to take the bench's advice and to henceforth pay in the coin of the realm).)

Whereas an Act passed in the Sixth Year of His present Majesty King George the Fourth, intituled An Act to make further Provisions for the Regulation of Cotton Mills and Factories, and for the better Preservation of the Health of young Persons employed therein: And Whereas the Provisions of the said Act have been defeated and set aside for Want of Form;

Be it therefore enacted by the King's most Excellent Majesty, by and with the Advice and Consent of the Lords Spiritual and Temporal, and Commons, in this present Parliament assembled, and by the Authority of the same, That from and after the passing of this Act it shall not be deemed necessary in any Information, Summons, or Warrant issued in pursuance of the said recited Act, to set forth the Name or Other Designation of each and every the Partners in any Cotton Mill or Factory, but that it shall be lawful to insert in such Information, Summons, or Warrant, the Name of the ostensible Proprietor or Title of the Firm by which the Proprietor or Proprietors of any such Mill or Factory are usually designated and known.

II. And be it further enacted, That the Service of such Summons or Warrant on any principal Manager, Conductor, or Clerk of any Cotton Mill or Factory, during the usual Hours of working such Cotton Mill or Factory, shall be good and lawful Service.

III. And be it further enacted. That no Information filed, nor any Summons or Warrant served, as directed by the said recited Act, or by this Act, shall be quashed for Informality or Want of Form.

Whereas a Bill, intituled An Act to amend the Law relating to the Employment of Children in Cotton Mills and Factories, passed the Commons and was sent to the Lords on the Fourth Day of this instant June, and was agreed to by the Lords, with an Amendment: And Whereas the said Bill so amended was not returned to the Commons for their Agreement to such Amendment, but was by Mistake included amongst the Bills which received the Royal Assent on Friday the Nineteenth Day of this instant June: And Whereas since the said Bill received the Royal Assent the said Amendment has been approved of by the Commons; Be it enacted by the King's most Excellent Majesty, by and with the Advice and Consent of the Lords Spiritual and Temporal, and Commons, in this present Parliament assembled, and by the Authority of the same, That the Act, intituled An Act to amend the Law relating to the Employment of Children in Cotton Mills and Factories, shall be as valid and effectual, to all Intents and Purposes, as if the Amendment made by the Lords had been agreed to by the Commons before the said Act received the Royal Assent.

== Labour in Cotton Mills Act 1831 (Hobhouse's Act) ==
Mule Spinning in action : child 'piecers' spent their day mending broken threads on the moving machinery

The Labour in Cotton Mills Act 1831 (1 & 2 Will. 4. c. 39) repealed the Cotton Mills and Factories Act 1819 (59 Geo. 3. c. 66), the Labour in Cotton Mills, etc. Act 1819 (60 Geo. 3. c. 5), the Cotton Mills, etc. Act 1825 (6 Geo. 4. c. 63), the Labour in Cotton Mills, etc. Act 1829 (10 Geo. 4. c. 51) and the Labour in Cotton Mills, etc. (No. 2) Act 1829 (10 Geo. 4. c. 63). In 1831, Hobhouse introduced a further bill with – he claimed to the Commons – the support of the leading manufacturers who felt that "unless the House should step forward and interfere so as to put an end to the night-work in the small factories where it was practised, it would be impossible for the large and respectable factories which conformed to the existing law to compete with them."

The act repealed the previous acts, and consolidated their provisions in a single act, which also introduced further restrictions. Night working was forbidden for anyone under 21 and if a mill had been working at night the onus of proof was on the millowner (to show nobody under-age had been employed). The limitation of working hours to twelve now applied up to age eighteen. Complaints could only be pursued if made within three weeks of the offence; on the other hand justices of the peace who were the brothers of millowners were now also debarred from hearing Factory Act cases. Hobhouse's claim of general support was optimistic; the bill originally covered all textile mills; the act as passed again applied only to cotton mills.

== Labour of Children, etc., in Factories Act 1833 (Althorp's Act) ==
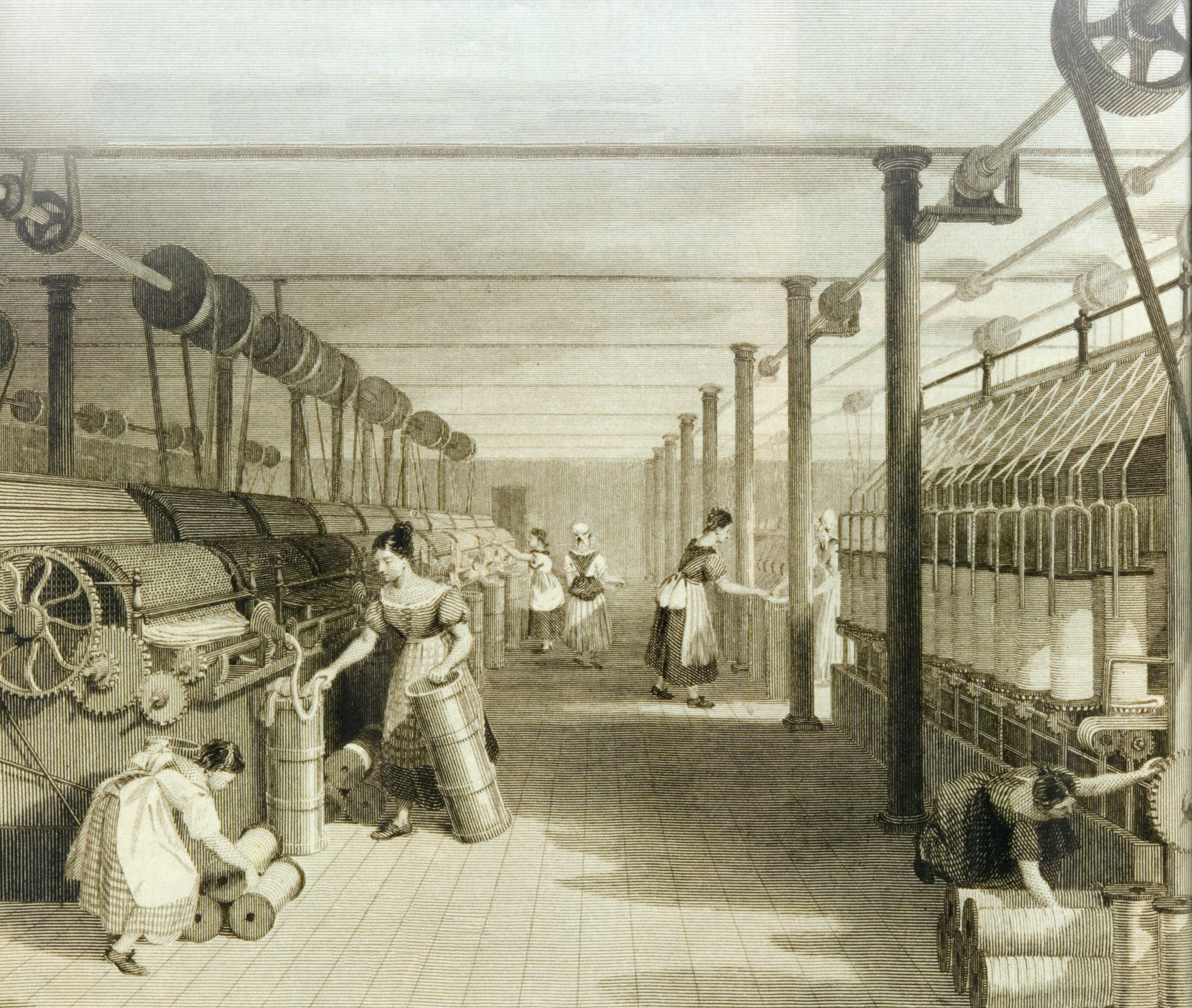
Carding, roving, and drawing in a Manchester cotton mill c. 1834

=== First Ten Hour Bill – Sadler's Bill (1832) and Ashley's Bill (1833) ===
Dissatisfied with the outcome of Hobhouse's efforts, in 1832 Michael Thomas Sadler introduced a bill extending the protection existing Factory Acts gave to children working in the cotton industry to those in other textile industries, and reducing to ten per day the working hours of children in the industries legislated for. A network of "Short Time Committees" had grown up in the textile districts of Yorkshire and Lancashire, working for a "ten-hour day Act" for children, with many millhands in the Ten Hour Movement hoping that this would in practice also limit the adult working day. Witnesses to one of the Committees taking evidence on Peel's Bill had noted that there were few millworkers over forty, and that they themselves expected to have to stop mill work at that age because of "the pace of the mill" unless working hours were reduced.

Hobhouse advised Richard Oastler, an early and leading advocate of factory legislation for the woolen industry, that Hobhouse had got as much as he could, given the opposition of Scottish flax-spinners and "the state of public business": (Note: By which he meant that Parliament had been fully occupied with the Reform Bill, so time could not have been found for a debate on opposed clauses: as noted above the Third Reading debate on Hobhouses's Bill took place c. 2 am) if Sadler put forward a bill matching the aims of the Short Time Committees "he will not be allowed to proceed a single stage with any enactment, and ... he will only throw an air of ridicule and extravagance over the whole of this kind of legislation". Oastler responded that a failure with a Ten Hour Bill would "not dishearten its friends. It will only spur them on to greater exertions, and would undoubtedly lead to certain success".

==== Sadler's Bill (1832) ====
Sadler's Bill when introduced indeed corresponded closely to the aims of the Short Time Committees. Hobhouse's ban on nightwork up to 21 was retained; no child under nine was to be employed; and the working day for under-eighteens was to be no more than ten hours (eight on Saturday). These restrictions were to apply across all textile industries. The Second Reading debate on Sadler's bill did not take place until 16 March 1832, the Reform Bill having taken precedence over all other legislation.

Meanwhile, petitions both for and against the bill had been presented to the Commons; both Sir Robert Peel (not the originator of the 1802 bill, but his son, the future Prime Minister) and Sir George Strickland had warned that the bill as it stood was too ambitious: more MPs had spoken for further factory legislation than against, but many supporters wanted the subject to be considered by a select committee. Sadler had resisted this: "if the present Bill was referred to one, it would not become a law this Session, and the necessity of legislating was so apparent, that he was unwilling to submit to the delay of a Committee, when he considered they could obtain no new evidence on the subject".

In his long Second Reading speech, Sadler argued repeatedly that a committee was unnecessary, but concluded by accepting that he had not convinced the House or the government of this, and that the bill would be referred to a select Ccommittee. (Lord Althorp, responding for the government, noted that Sadler's speech made a strong case for considering legislation, but thought it did little to directly support the details of the bill; the government supported the bill as leading to a select committee, but would not in advance pledge support for whatever legislation the committee might recommend).

This effectively removed any chance of a Factories Regulation Act being passed before Parliament was dissolved. Sadler was made chairman of the Committee, which allowed him to make his case by hearing evidence from witnesses of Sadler's selection, on the understanding that opponents of the bill (or of some feature of it) would then have their innings. Sadler attempted on 31 July 1832 to progress his bill without waiting for the committee's report; when this abnormal procedure was objected to by other MPs, he withdrew the bill. Sadler, as chairman of the committee, reported the minutes of evidence on 8 August 1832, when they were ordered to be printed. Parliament was prorogued shortly afterwards: Sadler gave notice of his intention to reintroduce a Ten-Hour Bill in the next session.

==== Ashley's Bill (1833) ====
Sadler, however, was not an MP in the next session: in the first election for the newly enfranchised two member constituency of Leeds he was beaten into third place by Thomas Babington Macaulay a Whig politician of national standing and John Marshall, the son of one of Leeds's leading millowners. Casting around for a new parliamentary advocate for factory reform, the short-time movement eventually secured the services of Lord Ashley, eldest son of the 6th Earl of Shaftesbury. By the time the new parliament met, public opinion (especially outside the textile districts) had been powerfully affected by 'the report of Mr Sadler's Committee'.

Extracts from this began to appear in newspapers in January 1833 and painted a picture of the life of a mill-child as one of systematic over-work and systematic brutality. The conclusion many papers drew was that Sadler's Bill should be revived and passed. However, when Ashley introduced a bill essentially reproducing Sadler's, MPs criticised both the report (since the only witnesses heard had been Sadler's, the report was unbalanced; since witnesses had not testified on oath, doubts were expressed about the accuracy/veracity of the more lurid accounts of factory life) and Sadler's conduct. 'An air of ridicule and extravagance' had been thrown not upon factory legislation, but upon the use of Select Committees for fact-finding on factory conditions.

A Factory Commission was set up to investigate and report. Sadler and the Short Time Committees objected to any further fact-finding and attempted to obstruct the work of the Commissioners. Ashley's Bill proceeded to a Second Reading in early July 1833 (when the likely main recommendations of the Commission were known, but its report was not yet available to MPs); Ashley wanted the bill to then be considered by a committee of the whole House and defeated Lord Althorp's amendment to refer the bill to a select committee. However at committee stage the first point considered where the bill differed from the commission's was the age up to which hours of work should be limited Ashley lost (heavily) the vote on this, and left it to Althorp to pilot through a Factory Act based upon the commission's recommendations.

=== 1833 Factory Commission ===
This toured the textile districts and made extensive investigations. It wasted little time in doing so, and even less in considering its report; as with other Whig commissions of the period it was suspected to have had a good idea of its recommendations before it started work. During the course of the Factory Commission's inquiries, relationships between it and the Ten Hour Movement became thoroughly adversarial, the Ten Hour Movement attempting to organise a boycott of the commission's investigations: this was in sharp contrast with the commissioners' practice of dining with the leading manufacturers of the districts they visited.

The commission's report did not support the more lurid details of Sadler's report; mills were not hotbeds of sexual immorality, and beating of children was much less common than Sadler had asserted, and was dying out. Major millowners such as the Strutts did not tolerate it, and were distinguished by their assiduous benevolence to their employees. Working conditions for mill-children were preferable to those in other industries: after a visit to the coal mine at Worsley one of the commission staff had written

"as this was said to be the best mine in the place, I cannot much err in coming to the conclusion, that the hardest labour in the worst-conducted factory is less hard, less cruel, and less demoralizing than the labour in the best of coal-mines".

Nonetheless, the commission reported that mill children did work unduly long hours, leading to:

- Permanent deterioration of the physical constitution:
- The production of disease often wholly irremediable: and
- The partial or entire exclusion (by reason of excessive fatigue) from the means of obtaining adequate education and acquiring useful habits, or of profiting by those means when afforded

It argued that these ill-effects were so marked and significant that government intervention was justified but where Sadler's Bill was for a ten-hour day for all workers under eighteen, the commission recommended an eight-hour day for those under thirteen, hoping for a two-shift system for them which would allow mills to run 16 hours a day.

=== Althorp's Act (1833) ===
Labour of Children, etc., in Factories Act 1833 (Note: Also known as the Factories Act 1833. Section 4 of the Factory Acts Extension Act 1867 (30 & 31 Vict. c. 103))
- Act of Parliament
- Parliament of the United Kingdom
- Long title: An Act to regulate the labour of children and young persons in the mills and factories of the United Kingdom.
- Citation: 3 & 4 Will. 4. c. 103
- Territorial extent: United Kingdom

Dates
- Royal assent: 29 August 1833
- Commencement: 1 January 1834
- Repealed: 1 January 1879
Other legislation
Repeals/revokes	Labour in Cotton Mills Act 1831
Amended by	Regulation of Factories Act 1834; Factory Act 1844; Factories Act 1847; Factory Act 1850; Factory Act 1853; Bleaching and Dyeing Works Act 1860; Lace Factory Act 1861; Factory Acts Extension Act 1864; Factory Acts Extension Act 1867; Factory Act 1874Statute Law Revision Act 1874
Repealed by	Factory and Workshop Act 1878
Relates to	Health and Morals of Apprentices Act 1802

Status: Repealed

Text of statute as originally enacted

The Labour of Children, etc., in Factories Act 1833 (3 & 4 Will. 4. c. 103) was an attempt to establish a regular working day in textile manufacture. The act had the following provisions:

- Children (ages 9–12) are limited to 48 hours per week.
- Children under 9 were not allowed to be employed in factories, except in silk mills.
- Children under 18 must not work at night (i.e. after 8.30 p.m. and before 5.30 a.m.)
- Children (ages 9–13) must not work more than 8 hours with an hour lunch break. (Employers could (and it was envisaged they would) operate a 'relay system' with two shifts of children between them covering the permitting working day; adult millworkers therefore being 'enabled' to work a 15-hour day)
- Children (ages 9–13) could only be employed if they had a schoolmaster's certificate that the previous week they had two hours of education per day (This was to be paid for by a deduction of a penny in the shilling from the children's wages. A factory inspector could disallow payment of any of this money to an 'incompetent' schoolmaster, but could not cancel a certificate issued by him.)
- Children (ages 14–18) must not work more than 12 hours a day with an hour lunch break.
- Provided for routine inspections of factories and set up a Factory Inspectorate (subordinate to the Home Office) to carry out such inspections, with the right to demand entry and the authority to act as a magistrate. (Under previous acts supervision had been by local 'visitors' (a justice of the peace (JP), and a clergyman) and effectively discretionary). The inspectors were empowered to make and enforce rules and regulations on the detailed application of the act, independent of the Home Secretary
- Millowners and their close relatives were no longer debarred (if JPs) from hearing cases brought under previous acts, but were unlikely to be effectively supervised by their colleagues on the local bench or be zealous in supervising other millowners

Regulation of Factories Act 1834
- Act of Parliament
- Parliament of the United Kingdom
- Long title: An Act to explain and amend an Act of the last Session of Parliament, for regulating the Labour of Children and young Persons in the Mills and Factories of the United Kingdom.
- Citation: 4 & 5 Will. 4. c. 1
- Territorial extent: United Kingdom

Dates
- Royal assent: 20 February 1834
- Commencement: 20 February 1834
- Repealed: 16 July 1874
Other legislation
Amends	Labour of Children, etc., in Factories Act 1833
Amended by	Factory Act 1874
Repealed by	Statute Law Revision Act 1874

Status: Repealed

Text of statute as originally enacted

The act failed to specify whether lunar or calendar months were intended where the word 'monthly' was used, and one clause limited hours of work per week where a daily limit had been intended. A short amending act, the Regulation of Factories Act 1834 (4 & 5 Will. 4. c. 1) was therefore passed in February 1834

== Ineffectual attempts at legislation (1835–1841) ==
The 1833 act had few admirers in the textile districts when it came into force. The short-time movement objected to its substitution for Ashley's Bill, and hoped to secure a Ten-Hour Bill. Millowners resented and political economists deplored legislators' interference in response to public opinion, and hoped that the act could soon be repealed (completely or in part). In 1835, the first report of the Factory Inspectors noted that the education clauses were totally impracticable, and relay working (with a double set of children, both sets working eight hours; the solution which allowed Althorp's Bill to outbid Ashley's in the apparent benefit to children) was difficult if not impracticable, there not being enough children. (Note: As of May 1835, there were reported to be 360,000 employed in factory labour, of whom 100,000 were children under fourteen, 80–90,000 adult males, and the remaining 170–180,000 women and young persons (aged 14–20) The 1841 Census reported that in England, Scotland and Wales there were about 7.3 million people under 21, which would appear to imply that whilst less than 3% of the adult population of the UK were factory workers, factory children constituted about 7% of the total 10–13 age-group. The 1841 Census reported the population of Lancashire and the West Riding of Yorkshire to be about 10% of the total British population.)They also reported that they had been unable to discover any deformity produced by factory labour, nor any injury to health or shortening of the life of factory children caused by working a twelve-hour day. The inspectors appointed were also largely ineffective, simply because there were not enough of them to oversee all 4,000 factories on the island. The idea of government-appointed inspectors would gain traction within the following decades, but for now, they were mostly figureheads.

=== Poulett Thomson's bill (1836) ===
Three of the four inspectors had recommended in their first report that all children 12 or older should be allowed to work twelve hours a day. This was followed by an agitation in the West Riding for relaxation or repeal of the 1833 Act; the short-time movement alleged that workers were being 'leant on' by their employers to sign petitions for repeal, and countered by holding meetings and raising petitions for a ten-hour act. Charles Hindley prepared a draft bill limiting the hours that could be worked by any mill employing people under twenty-one, with no child under ten to be employed, and no education clauses. Hindley's bill was published at the end of the 1834-5 parliamentary session, but was not taken forward in the next session, being pre-empted by a government bill introduced by Charles Poulett Thomson, the President of the Board of Trade, allowing children twelve or over to work twelve hours a day.

The second reading of Poulett Thomson's Bill was opposed by Ashley, who denounced the bill as a feeler towards total repeal of protection for factory children. The bill passed its second reading by a majority of only two (178–176) – a moral defeat for a government measure. Furthermore, although Poulett Thomson had opened the debate by saying that "at the present moment he was unwilling to re-open the whole factory question", Peel had said he would vote for the second reading, not because he supported the bill, but because its committee stage would allow the introduction of additional amendments to factory legislation. Poulett Thomson (eventually) abandoned the bill.

In 1837 Poulett Thomson announced his intention to bring in a factory bill; consequently Ashley, who had intended to introduce a ten-hour bill, dropped this, promising instead a ten-hour amendment to the government bill. No progress had been made with the government bill when the death of King William, and the consequent dissolution of parliament, brought the session to an end.

=== Fox Maule's bill (1838) ===
In the 1838 session another government factory bill was introduced by Fox Maule Under-Secretary of State for the Home Department. Children in silk mills were not to work more than ten hours a day (but this was not backed up by any certification of age). Otherwise, the bill made no changes to age limits or hours of work, but repealed the education clauses of the 1833 Act, replacing them with literacy tests. After a transitional period, children who could not read the New Testament were not to be employed more than nine hours a day; children who could not read an easy reader to be published by the Home Secretary could not be employed.

His political opponents mocked the thought of Lord John Russell turning his undoubted talents to the production of a reading primer, and it was soon announced that once the bill went into committee it would be amended to restore the 1833 education clauses. The second reading of the bill was scheduled for 22 June, but in early June Russell announced that the bill had been abandoned for the session.

==== 1838: Ashley denounces government complacency ====
On 22 June, when the government intended to progress a bill on Irish tithes, Ashley forestalled them, moving the second reading of the factory bill. He complained of the evasive conduct of ministers and government apathy and complacency on factory reform. Peel (who normally, even in opposition, deprecated obstruction of government business by backbenchers (Note: In this case and presumably on Peel's instructions, obstruction seems to have been avoided: once the debate on Ashley's motion was complete the reading of the Irish tithes bill was unopposed)) supported Ashley: he held very different views on the issue from Ashley, but the issue was important, contentious, and should not be evaded : "so long as ineffectual attempts at legislation remained on the table of the house, the excitement of the manufacturing districts would continue to be kept up" (Note: 1838 had seen the first flowering of Chartism in the manufacturing districts, which would lead to monster meetings at Kersal Moor (September 1838) and Peep Green (Hartshead Moor)(October 1838): the speeches at those meetings suggest however that the New Poor Law was the major immediate issue, rather than factory legislation.) Ashley's motion was lost narrowly 111 to 119.

Ashley later attacked the government and its complacency and connivance at the shortcomings in the current Factory Act identified by the government's own Factory Inspectors:

- Althorp's Act had claimed superiority over Ashley's Bill of 1833 because of its shorter working hours for children and its provision for education. Those provisions had been violated from the outset, and continued to be violated, and the government connived at those violations: "notwithstanding the urgent representations and remonstrances of their own inspectors, the Government had done nothing whatever to assist them in the discharge of their duties"
- Millowners sat on the bench and adjudicated in their own cases (because Althorp's Act had repealed the provisions in Hobhouse's Act forbidding this): they countersigned surgeon's certificates for children employed in their own factory . (Note: Age certificates for children could be issued by surgeons other that those approved by a factory inspector, provided the certificate was counter-signed by a magistrate) One factory inspector had reported a case of a millowner sitting as magistrate on a case brought against his own sons, as tenants of a mill he owned.
- Magistrates had the power to mitigate the penalties specified in the act. The inspectors reported that magistrates habitually did so, and to an extent which defeated the law; it was more profitable to break the law and pay the occasional fine than to comply with the act.

"After these representations .. by his own inspectors, how could the noble Lord opposite reconcile it with his conscience as an individual, and with his public duty as a Minister of the Crown, during the whole course of his administration, never to have brought forward any measure for the removal of so tremendous an evil?"

- The education clauses were not observed in one mill in fifty; where they were, the factory inspectors reported, "the schooling given is a mere mockery of instruction"; vice and ignorance, and their natural consequences, misery and suffering, were rife among the population of the manufacturing districts. "Would the noble Lord opposite venture to say that the education of the manufacturing classes was a matter of indifference to the country at large?"

"He wanted them to decide whether they would amend, or repeal, or enforce the act now in existence; but if they would do none of these things, if they continued idly indifferent, and obstinately shut their eyes to this great and growing evil, if they were careless of the growth of an immense population, plunged in ignorance and vice, which neither feared God, nor regarded man, then he warned them that they must be prepared for the very worst result that could befall a nation."

=== Fox Maule tries again (1839–41) ===
In the 1839 session, Fox Maule revived the 1838 bill with alterations. The literacy tests were gone, and the education clauses restored. The only other significant changes in the scope of the legislation were that working extra hours to recover lost time was now only permitted for water-powered mills, and magistrates could not countersign surgeon's certificates if they were mill-owners or occupiers (or father, son, or brother of a mill-owner or occupier). Details of enforcement were altered; there was no longer any provision for inspectors to be magistrates ex officio, sub-inspectors were to have nearly the same enforcement powers as inspectors; unlike inspectors they could not examine witnesses on oath, but they now had the same right of entry into factory premises as inspectors.

Declaring a schoolmaster incompetent was now to invalidate certificates of education issued by him, and a clause in the bill aimed to make it easier to establish and run a school for factory children; children at schools formed under this clause were not to be educated in a creed objected to by their parents.

The bill, introduced in February, did not enter its committee stage until the start of July In committee, a ten-hour amendment was defeated 62–94, but Ashley moved and carried 55-49 an amendment removing the special treatment of silk mills. The government then declined to progress the amended bill.

No attempt was made to introduce a factory bill in 1840; Ashley obtained a select committee on the working of the existing Factory Act, which took evidence, most notably from members of the Factory Inspectorate, throughout the session with a view to a new bill being introduced in 1841. Ashley was then instrumental in obtaining a royal commission on the employment of children in mines and manufactures, which eventually reported in 1842 (mines) and 1843 (manufactures): two of the four commissioners had served on the 1833 Factory Commission; the other two were serving factory inspectors.

In March 1841 Fox Maule introduced a Factory Bill and a separate Silk Factory Bill. The Factory Bill provided that children were now not to work more than seven hours a day; if working before noon they couldn't work after one p.m. The education clauses of the 1839 bill were retained. 'Dangerous machinery' was now to be brought within factory legislation. Both the Factory and Silk Factory bills were given unopposed second readings on the understanding that all issues would be discussed at committee stage, both were withdrawn before going into committee, the Whigs having been defeated on a motion of no confidence, and a General Election imminent.

== Graham's Factory Education Bill (1843) ==
The Whigs were defeated in the 1841 general election, and Sir Robert Peel formed a Conservative government. Ashley let it be known that he had declined office under Peel because Peel would not commit himself not to oppose a ten-hour bill; Ashley therefore wished to retain freedom of action on factory issues. In February 1842, Peel indicated definite opposition to a ten-hour bill, and Sir James Graham, Peel's Home Secretary, declared his intention to proceed with a bill prepared by Fox Maule, but with some alterations. In response to the findings of his royal commission, Ashley saw through Parliament the Mines and Collieries Act 1842, banning the employment of women and children underground; the measure was welcomed by both front benches, with Graham assuring Ashley "that her Majesty's Government would render him every assistance in carrying on the measure". In July, it was announced that the government did not intend any modification to the Factory Act in that session.

=== Education issue and Graham's bill ===
The royal commission had investigated not only the working hours and conditions of the children, but also their moral state. It had found much of concern in their habits and language, but the greatest concern was that "the means of secular and religious instruction... are so grievously defective, that, in all the districts, great numbers of Children and Young Persons are growing up without any religious, moral, or intellectual training; nothing being done to form them to habits of order, sobriety, honesty, and forethought, or even to restrain them from vice and crime." (Note: A member of the Commission separately suggested, in his capacity as Factory Inspector, that the Plug Plot Riots and other Chartist disturbances in Ashton-under-Lyne could have been averted had more attention been paid in the past to the education of the humbler classes of the district by their superiors). It is unclear how far this political aspect drove the education initiative. For the record, the Chartist Northern Star supported Graham's education clauses; education and intellectual culture were the means "by which the working man comes to know something of the framework of society, and to understand what his rights are, as a first step towards the assertion of them") In 1843, Ashley initiated a debate on "the best means of diffusing the benefits and blessings of a moral and religious education among the working classes..."

Responding, Graham stressed that the issue was not a party one (and was borne out on this by the other speakers in the debate); although the problem was a national one, the government would for the moment bring forward measures only for the two areas of education in which the state already had some involvement; the education of workhouse children and the education of factory children. The measures he announced related to England and Wales; Scotland had an established system of parochial schools run by its established church, with little controversy, since in Scotland there was no dissent on doctrine, only on questions of discipline.

In the 'education clauses' of his Factory Education Bill of 1843, he proposed to make government loans to a new class of government factory schools effectively under the control of the Church of England and the local magistrates. The default religious education in these schools would be Anglican, but parents would be allowed to opt their children out of anything specifically Anglican; if the opt-out was exercised, religious education would be as in the best type of Dissenter-run schools.

Once a trust school was open in a factory district, factory children in that district would have to provide a certificate that they were being educated at it or at some other school certified as 'efficient'. The 'labour clauses' forming the other half of the bill were essentially a revival of Fox Maule's draft; children could work only in the morning or in the afternoon, but not both. There were two significant differences; the working day for children was reduced to six and a half hours, and the minimum age for factory work would be reduced to eight. Other clauses increased penalties and assisted enforcement.

=== Reaction, retreats, and abandonment ===
A Second Reading debate was held to flesh out major issues before going into committee. At Lord John Russell's urging, the discussion was temperate, but there was considerable opposition to the proposed management of the new schools, which effectively excluded ratepayers (who would repay the loan and meet any shortfall in running costs) and made no provision for a Dissenter presence (to see fair play). The provisions for appointment of schoolmasters were also criticised; as they stood they effectively excluded Dissenters.

Out of Parliament, the debate was less temperate; objections that the bill had the effect of strengthening the Church became objections that it was a deliberate attack on Dissent, that its main purpose was to attack Dissent, and that the royal commission had deliberately and grossly defamed the population of the manufacturing districts to give a spurious pretext for an assault on Dissent. Protest meetings were held on that basis throughout the country, and their resolutions condemning the bill and calling for its withdrawal were supported by a campaign of organised petitions: that session Parliament received 13,369 petitions against the bill as drafted with a total of 2,069,058 signatures. (For comparison, in the same session there were 4574 petitions for total repeal of the Corn Laws, with a total of 1,111,141 signatures.)

Lord John Russell drafted resolutions calling for modification of the bill along the lines suggested in Parliament; the resolutions were denounced as inadequate by the extra-parliamentary opposition. Graham amended the educational clauses, but this only triggered a fresh round of indignation meetings and a fresh round of petitions (11,839 petitions and 1,920,574 signatures). Graham then withdrew the education clauses but this did not end the objections, since it did not entirely restore the status quo ante on education.

Indeed the education requirements of the Labour of Children, etc., in Factories Act 1833 now came under attack, the Leeds Mercury declaring education was something individuals could do for themselves "under the guidance of natural instinct and self-interest, infinitely better than Government could do for them". Hence "All Government interference to COMPEL Education is wrong" and had unacceptable implications: "If Government has a right to compel Education, it has right to compel RELIGION !" Although as late as 17 July Graham said he intended to get the bill though in the current session, three days later the bill was one of those Peel announced would be dropped for that session.

== Factory Act 1844 (Graham's Factory Act) ==
Factory Act 1844 (Note: Section 4 of the Factory Acts Extension Act 1867 (30 & 31 Vict. c. 103).)
- Act of Parliament
- Parliament of the United Kingdom
- Long title: An Act to amend the Laws relating to Labour in Factories.
- Citation: 7 & 8 Vict. c. 15
- Territorial extent: United Kingdom

Dates
- Royal assent: 6 June 1844
- Commencement: 1 October 1844
- Repealed: 1 January 1879
Other legislation
Amends	Labour of Children, etc., in Factories Act 1833; Constables Protection Act 1750
Amended by	Ropeworks Act 1846; Factories Act 1847; Factory Act 1850; Factory Act 1853; Factory Act 1856; Bleaching and Dyeing Works Act 1860; Lace Factory Act 1861; Factory Acts Extension Act 1864; Factory Acts Extension Act 1867; Factory Act 1874; Statute Law Revision Act 1874 (No. 2)
Repealed by	Factory and Workshop Act 1878
Relates to	Bleaching and Dyeing Works Act Amendment Act 1863; Factory Act 1874

Status: Repealed

Text of statute as originally enacted

In 1844 Graham again introduced a bill to bring in a new act and repeal the Labour of Children, etc., in Factories Act 1833 (3 & 4 Will. 4. c. 103). The bill gave educational issues a wide berth, but otherwise largely repeated the 'labour clauses' of Graham's 1843 bill, with the important difference that the existing protection of young persons (a twelve-hour day and a ban on night working) was now extended to women of all ages. In committee, Lord Ashley moved an amendment to the bill's clause 2, which defined the terms used in subsequent (substantive) clauses; his amendment changed the definition of 'night' to 6 p.m. to 6 a.m. – after allowing 90 minutes for meal breaks only ten-and-a-half hours could be worked; this passed by nine votes. On clause 8, limiting the hours of work for women and young persons, the motion setting a twelve-hour day was defeated (by three votes: 183–186) but Lord Ashley's motion setting the limit at ten hours was also defeated (by seven votes:181–188).

Voting on this bill was not on party lines, the issue revealing both parties to be split into various factions. On clause 8, both 'ten' and 'twelve' hours were rejected (with exactly the same members voting) because five members voted against both "ten" and "twelve". Faced with this impasse, and having considered and rejected the option of compromising on some intermediate time such as eleven hours, (Note: Of the five MPs who voted 'against both 'ten' and 'twelve', three seem to have given no explanation, of the other two William Aldam spoke in support of an eleven-hour day in the 22 March debate, William Ewart spoke in favour of an eleven-hour compromise in the 25 March debate.) Graham withdrew the bill, preferring to replace it by a new one which amended, rather than repealed, the Labour of Children, etc., in Factories Act 1833 (3 & 4 Will. 4. c. 103).

Richard Monckton Milnes, a Radical MP warned the government during the debate on clause 8 that Ashley's first victory could never be undone by any subsequent vote: morally the Ten-Hour question had been settled; the government might delay, but could not now prevent, a Ten-Hour Act. However, the new bill left the 1833 definition of 'night' unaltered (and so gave no opportunity for redefinition) and Lord Ashley's amendment to limit the working day for women and young persons to ten hours was defeated heavily (295 against, 198 for), it having been made clear that the ministers would resign if they lost the vote.

As a result, the Factory Act 1844 (7 & 8 Vict. c. 15) again set a twelve-hour day, its main provisions being:

- Children 9–13 years could work for 9 hours a day with a lunch break.
- Ages must be verified by surgeons.
- Women and young people now worked the same number of hours. They could work for no more than 12 hours a day during the week, including one and a half hours for meals, and 9 hours on Sundays. They must all take their meals at the same time and could not do so in the workroom
- Time-keeping to be by a public clock approved by an inspector
- Some classes of machinery: every fly-wheel directly connected with the steam engine or water-wheel or other mechanical power, whether in the engine-house or not, and every part of a steam engine and water-wheel, and every hoist or teagle, (Note: 'Teagle' is a dialect word for 'hoist' (OED)) near to which children or young persons are liable to pass or be employed, and all parts of the mill-gearing (this included power shafts) in a factory were to be "securely fenced."
- Children and women were not to clean moving machinery.
- Accidental death must be reported to a surgeon and investigated; the result of the investigation to be reported to a factory inspector.
- Factory owners must wash factories with lime every fourteen months.
- Thorough records must be kept regarding the provisions of the act and shown to the inspector on demand.
- An abstract of the amended act must be hung up in the factory so as to be easily read, and show (amongst other things) names and addresses of the inspector and sub-inspector of the district, the certifying surgeon, the times for beginning and ending work, the amount of time and time of day for meals.
- Factory inspectors no longer had the powers of JPs but (as before 1833) millowners, their fathers, brothers and sons were all debarred (if magistrates) from hearing Factory Act cases.

== Factories Act 1847 ==
After the collapse of the Peel administration which had resisted any reduction in the working day to less than 12 hours, a Whig administration under Lord John Russell came to power. The new Cabinet contained supporters and opponents of a ten-hour day and Lord John himself favoured an eleven-hour day. The government therefore had no collective view on the matter; in the absence of government opposition, the Ten Hour Bill was passed, becoming the Factories Act 1847 (10 & 11 Vict. c. 29). This law (also known as the Ten Hour Act) limited the work week in textile mills (and other textile industries except lace and silk production) for women and children under 18 years of age. Each work week contained 63 hours effective 1 July 1847 and was reduced to 58 hours effective 1 May 1848. In effect, this law limited the work hours only for women and children to 10 hours which earlier was 12 hours.

This law was successfully passed due to the contributions of the Ten Hours Movement. This campaign was established during the 1830s and was responsible for voicing demands towards limiting the work week in textile mills. The core of the movement was the 'Short Time Committees' set up (by millworkers and sympathisers) in the textile districts, but the main speakers for the cause were Richard Oastler (who led the campaign outside Parliament) and Lord Ashley, 7th Earl of Shaftesbury (who led the campaign inside Parliament). John Fielden, although no orator, was indefatigable in his support of the cause, giving generously of his time and money and – as the senior partner in one of the great cotton firms – vouching for the reality of the evils of a long working day and the practicality of shortening it.

== Factory Act 1850 (the Compromise Act) ==
Factory Act 1850
- Act of Parliament
- Parliament of the United Kingdom
- Long title: An Act to amend the Acts relating to labour in factories.
- Citation: 13 & 14 Vict. c. 54
- Territorial extent: United Kingdom

Dates
- Royal assent: 5 August 1850
- Commencement: 5 August 1850
- Repealed: 1 January 1879
Other legislation
Amends	Labour of Children, etc., in Factories Act 1833; Factory Act 1844; Factories Act 1847
Amended by	Factory Act 1853; Bleaching and Dyeing Works Act 1860; Lace Factory Act 1861; Factory Acts Extension Act 1864; Factory Acts Extension Act 1867; Factory Act 1874; Statute Law Revision Act 1875
Repealed by	Factory and Workshop Act 1878

Status: Repealed

Text of statute as originally enacted

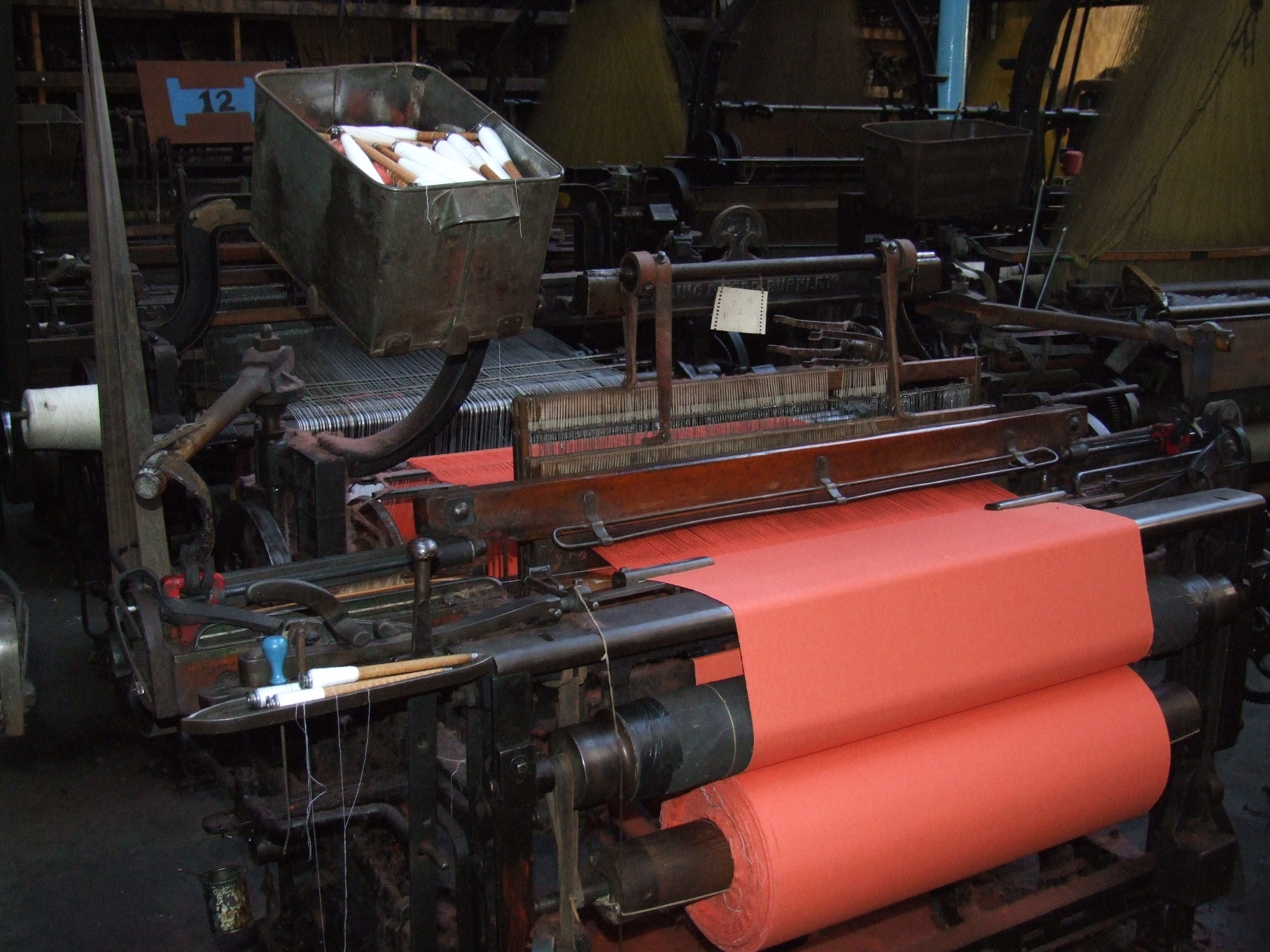
A Victorian power loom (Lancashire loom)

The Factory Act 1844 (7 & 8 Vict. c. 15) and the Factories Act 1847 (10 & 11 Vict. c. 29) had reduced the hours per day which any woman or young person could work but not the hours of the day within which they could do that work (from 5:30 a.m. to 8:30 p.m.). Under the Labour of Children, etc., in Factories Act 1833 (3 & 4 Will. 4. c. 103) millowners (or some of them) had used a 'relay system' so that the mill could operate all the permitted hours without any protected person exceeding their permitted workday. The 1833 act had hoped that two sets of children would be employed and each work a full half-day (the 'true relay' system, which left the other half-day free for education). Instead, some mills operated a 'false relay' system in which the protected persons worked split shifts. The false relay system was considered objectionable both because of the effect on the protected persons (Note: Both because thrown out of mill for a couple of hours in all weathers, and because releasing teenagers from factory discipline and leaving them to their own devices for a couple of hours in the proximity of members of the opposite sex (and possibly of dram-shops) was inconsistent with Victorian morals) and because an inspector (or other millowners) could relatively easily monitor the hours a mill ran; it was much more difficult if not impossible to check the hours worked by an individual (as an inspector observed "the lights in the window will discover the one but not the other")

Section 26 of the Factory Act 1844 required that the hours of work of all protected persons "shall be reckoned from the time when any child or young person shall first begin to work in the morning in such factory." but nothing in it or in the Factories Act 1847 clearly prohibited split shifts (although this had been Parliament's intention). (Note: The legal issues are laid out concisely and in layman's language in a newspaper report of the 1849 prosecution of the employers of Isabella Robinson 15-year-old cotton spinner at a mill in Colne "last Tuesday she began to work at 6 am; she worked until 6:15, then she gave over working and someone else worked in her place; she returned to work at 8:30 and worked until 12:30, when she went to dinner and was away an hour; she came back at 1:30, and worked till 7:15") The factory inspector for Scotland considered split shifts to be legal; the inspector for Bradford thought them illegal and his local magistrates agreed with him: in Manchester the inspector thought them illegal but the magistrates did not. In 1850 the Court of Exchequer held that the section was to be too weakly worded to make relay systems illegal. (Note: prompting Punch to suggest it would be more appropriate to refer to the Unsatis-Factory Act)

Lord Ashley sought to remedy this by a short declaratory act restoring the status quo but felt it impossible to draft one which did not introduce fresh matter (which would remove the argument that there was no call for further debate). The Home Secretary Sir George Grey was originally noticeably ambivalent about government support for Ashley's Bill: when Ashley reported his difficulties to the House of Commons, Grey announced an intention to move amendments in favour of a scheme (ostensibly suggested by a third party), which established a 'normal day' for women and young persons by setting the times within which they could work so tightly that they were also the start and stop times if they were to work the maximum permitted hours per day. Grey's scheme increased the hours that could be worked per week, but Ashley (uncertain of the outcome of any attempt to re-enact a true Ten Hours Bill) decided to support it, and Grey's scheme was the basis for the Factory Act 1850 (13 & 14 Vict. c. 54). The Short Time Committees had previously been adamant for an effective Ten-hour Bill; Ashley wrote to them, noting that he acted in Parliament as their friend, not their delegate, explaining his reasons for accepting Grey's "compromise", and advising them to do so also. They duly did, significantly influenced by the thought that they could not afford to lose their friend in Parliament. The key provisions of the Factory Act 1850 were:

- Women and young persons could only work from 6 a.m. to 6 p.m. or – in winter, and subject to approval by a factory inspector – 7 a.m. to 7 p.m.: since they were to be allowed 90 minutes total breaks during the day, the maximum hours worked per day increased to 10.5
- All work would end on Saturday at 2 p.m.
- The work week was extended from 58 hours to 60 hours.

Various public meetings in the textile districts subsequently passed motions regretting that the 58-hour week had not been more stoutly defended, with various stalwarts of the Ten-Hour Movement (various Cobbetts and Fieldens (John Fielden now being dead) and Richard Oastler) offering their support and concurring with criticism of Ashley's actions, but nothing came of this: the meetings were poorly attended (that at Manchester was attended by about 900) and the Ten-Hour Movement had now effectively run its course.

Factory Act 1853
- Act of Parliament
- Parliament of the United Kingdom
- Long title: An Act further to regulate the Employment of Children in Factories.
- Citation: 16 & 17 Vict. c. 104
- Territorial extent: United Kingdom

Dates
- Royal assent: 20 August 1853
- Commencement: 1 September 1853 (Note: Section 6.)
- Repealed: 1 January 1879
Other legislation
Amends	Labour of Children, etc., in Factories Act 1833; Factory Act 1844; Factory Act 1850
Amended by	Bleaching and Dyeing Works Act 1860; Lace Factory Act 1861; Factory Acts Extension Act 1864; Factory Acts Extension Act 1867
Repealed by	Factory and Workshop Act 1878

Status: Repealed

Text of statute as originally enacted

Children (8–13) were not covered by this act: it had been the deliberate intention of the Labour of Children, etc., in Factories Act 1833 (10 & 11 Vict. c. 29) that a mill might use two sets of children on a relay system and the obvious method of doing so did not require split shifts. A further act, the Factory Act 1853 (16 & 17 Vict. c. 104), set similar limits on the hours within which children might work.

== Factory Act 1856 ==
Factory Act 1856
- Act of Parliament
- Parliament of the United Kingdom
- Long title: An Act for the further Amendment of the Laws relating to Labour in Factories.
- Citation: 19 & 20 Vict. c. 38
- Territorial extent: United Kingdom

Dates
- Royal assent: 30 June 1856
- Commencement: 1 June 1856 (Note: Section 2.)
- Repealed: 1 January 1879
Other legislation
Amends	Factory Act 1844
Amended by	Bleaching and Dyeing Works Act 1860; Lace Factory Act 1861; Factory Acts Extension Act 1864
Repealed by	Factory and Workshop Act 1878

Status: Repealed

Text of statute as originally enacted

Power shafting, belts and power looms in operation (Note: at Boott Mills, Lowell Massachusetts, but arrangements in Victorian Britain would have been much the same)

In April 1855 a National Association of Factory Occupiers (NAFO) was formed "to watch over factory legislation with a view to prevent any increase of the present unfair and injudicious enactments". The Factory Act 1844 (7 & 8 Vict. c. 15) had required that "mill gearing" – which included power shafts – should be securely fenced. Magistrates had taken inconsistent views as to whether this applied where the "mill gearing" was not readily accessible; in particular where power shafting ran horizontally well above head height. In 1856, the Court of Queen's Bench ruled that it did. In April 1856, the National Association of Factory Occupiers succeeded in obtaining the Factory Act 1856 (19 & 20 Vict. c. 38) reversing this decision: mill gearing needed secure fencing only of those parts with which women, young persons, and children were liable to come in contact. The inspectors feared that the potential hazards in areas they did not normally access might be obvious to experienced men, but not be easily appreciated by women and children who were due the legislative protection the 1856 act had removed, especially given the potential severe consequences of their inexperience.

An MP speaking against the bill was able to give multiple instances of accidents to protected persons resulting in death or loss of limbs – all caused by unguarded shafting with which they were supposedly not liable to come into contact – despite restricting himself to accidents in mills owned by Members of Parliament (so that he could be corrected by them if had misstated any facts). Dickens thereafter referred to the NAFO as the National Association for the Protection of the Right to Mangle Operatives. Harriet Martineau criticised Dickens for this, arguing that mangling was the result of workers not being careful and: "If men and women are to be absolved from the care of their own lives and limbs, and the responsibility put upon anybody else by the law of the land, the law of the land is lapsing into barbarism." For other parts of the mill gearing any dispute between the occupier and the inspector could be resolved by arbitration. The arbitration was to be by a person skilled in making the machinery to be guarded; the inspectors however declined to submit safety concerns to arbitration by those "who look only to the construction and working of the machinery, which is their business, and not to the prevention of accidents, which is not their business."

== Factory Act Extension Act 1867 ==
Bleaching and Dyeing Works Act 1860 (Note: Preamble of the Bleaching and Dyeing Works Act Extension Act 1864 (27 & 28 Vict. c. 98).)
- Act of Parliament
- Parliament of the United Kingdom
- Long title: An Act to place the Employment of Women Young Persons and Children in Bleaching Works and Dyeing Works under the Regulations of the Factories Acts.
- Citation: 23 & 24 Vict. c. 78
- Territorial extent: United Kingdom

Dates
- Royal assent: 6 August 1860
- Commencement: 1 August 1860
- Repealed: 1 January 1872
Other legislation
Amends	Labour of Children, etc., in Factories Act 1833; Factory Act 1844; Factories Act 1847; Factory Act 1850; Factory Act 1853; Factory Act 1856
Amended by	Bleaching and Dyeing Works Act Amendment Act 1863; Bleaching and Dyeing Works Act Extension Act 1864
Repealed by	Factory and Workshop Act 1870

Status: Repealed

Text of statute as originally enacted

Lace Factory Act 1861 (Note: Section 19 of the Factory Act 1874 (37 & 38 Vict. c. 44).)
- Act of Parliament
- Parliament of the United Kingdom
- Long title: An Act to place the Employment of Women, young Persons, Youths, and Children in Lace Factories under the Regulations of the Factories Act.
- Citation: 24 & 25 Vict. c. 117
- Territorial extent: United Kingdom

Dates
- Royal assent: 6 August 1861
- Commencement: 1 August 1862
- Repealed: 1 January 1879
Other legislation
Amends	Labour of Children, etc., in Factories Act 1833; Factory Act 1844; Factories Act 1847; Factory Act 1850; Factory Act 1853; Factory Act 1856
Amended by	Factory Act 1874
Repealed by	Factory and Workshop Act 1878
Relates to	Factory Act 1874

Status: Repealed

Text of statute as originally enacted

Bleaching and Dyeing Works Act Amendment Act 1863
- Act of Parliament
- Parliament of the United Kingdom
- Long title: An Act to amend the Act for placing the Employment of Women, young Persons, and Children in Bleaching Works and Dyeing Works under the Regulations of the Factories Acts.
- Citation: 26 & 27 Vict. c. 38
- Territorial extent: United Kingdom

Dates
- Royal assent: 29 June 1863
- Commencement: 29 June 1863
- Repealed: 1 January 1872
Other legislation
Amends	Bleaching and Dyeing Works Act 1860
Repealed by	Factory and Workshop Act 1870
Relates to	Bleaching and Dyeing Works Act Extension Act 1864

Status: Repealed

Text of statute as originally enacted

Factory Acts Extension Act 1864
- Act of Parliament
- Parliament of the United Kingdom
- Long title: An Act for the Extension of the Factory Acts.
- Citation: 27 & 28 Vict. c. 48
- Territorial extent: United Kingdom

Dates
- Royal assent: 25 July 1864
- Commencement: 25 July 1864
- Repealed: 1 January 1879
Other legislation
Amends	Labour of Children, etc., in Factories Act 1833; Factory Act 1844; Factory Act 1850; Factory Act 1853; Factory Act 1856
Amended by	Factory Acts Extension Act 1867; Factory Act 1874; Statute Law Revision Act 1875
Repealed by	Factory and Workshop Act 1878
Relates to	Bleaching and Dyeing Works Act Extension Act 1864

Status: Repealed

Text of statute as originally enacted

Bleaching and Dyeing Works Act Extension Act 1864
- Act of Parliament
- Parliament of the United Kingdom
- Long title: An Act for extending the Provisions of "The Bleaching and Dyeing Works Act, 1860."
- Citation: 27 & 28 Vict. c. 98
- Territorial extent: United Kingdom

Dates
- Royal assent: 29 July 1864
- Commencement: 29 July 1864
- Repealed: 1 January 1872
Other legislation
Amends	Bleaching and Dyeing Works Act 1860
Amended by	Factory and Workshop Act 1871; Statute Law Revision Act 1883
Repealed by	Factory and Workshop Act 1870
Relates to	Bleaching and Dyeing Works Act Amendment Act 1863; Factory Acts Extension Act 1864; Factory Acts Extension Act 1867

Status: Repealed

Text of statute as originally enacted

In virtually every debate on the various Factories Bills, opponents had thought it a nonsense to pass legislation for textile mills when the life of a mill child was much preferable to that of many other children: other industries were more tiring, more dangerous, more unhealthy, required longer working hours, involved more unpleasant working conditions, or (this being Victorian Britain) were more conducive to lax morals. This logic began to be applied in reverse once it became clear that the Ten Hours Act had had no obvious detrimental effect on the prosperity of the textile industry or on that of millworkers. Acts were passed making similar provisions for other textile trades: bleaching and dyeworks (the Bleaching and Dyeing Works Act 1860 (23 & 24 Vict. c. 78) – outdoor bleaching was excluded), lace work (the Lace Factory Act 1861 (24 & 25 Vict. c. 117)), calendaring (the Bleaching and Dyeing Works Act Amendment Act 1863 (26 & 27 Vict. c. 38)), and finishing (the Bleaching and Dyeing Works Act Extension Act 1864 (27 & 28 Vict. c. 98)). A further act, the Factory and Workshop Act 1870 (33 & 34 Vict. c. 62), repealed these acts and brought the ancillary textile processes (including outdoor bleaching) within the scope of the main Factory Act.

The Factory Acts Extension Act 1864 (27 & 28 Vict. c. 48) extended the Factories Act to cover a number of occupations (mostly non-textile): potteries (both heat and exposure to lead glazes were issues), lucifer match making ('phossie jaw') percussion cap and cartridge making, paper staining and fustian cutting.

Factory Acts Extension Act 1867
- Act of Parliament
- Parliament of the United Kingdom
- Long title: An Act for the Extension of the Factory Acts.
- Citation: 30 & 31 Vict. c. 103
- Territorial extent: United Kingdom

Dates
- Royal assent: 15 August 1867
- Commencement: 15 August 1867
- Repealed: 1 January 1879
Other legislation
Amends	Labour of Children, etc., in Factories Act 1833; Factory Act 1844; Factory Act 1850; Factory Act 1853; Factory Act 1856; Factory Acts Extension Act 1864
Amended by	Factory and Workshop Act 1870; Factory and Workshop Act 1871; Factory Act 1874; Statute Law Revision Act 1875
Repealed by	Factory and Workshop Act 1878
Relates to	Workshop Regulation Act 1867

Status: Repealed

Text of statute as originally enacted

Workshop Regulation Act 1867
- Act of Parliament
- Parliament of the United Kingdom
- Long title: An Act for regulating the Hours of Labour for Children, Young Persons, and Women employed in Workshops; and for other Purposes relating thereto.
- Citation: 30 & 31 Vict. c. 146
- Territorial extent: United Kingdom

Dates
- Royal assent: 21 August 1867
- Commencement: 1 January 1868 (Note: Section 3.)
- Repealed: 1 January 1879
Other legislation
Amends	Bakehouse Regulation Act 1863
Amended by	Factory and Workshop Act 1870; Factory and Workshop Act 1871
Repealed by	Factory and Workshop Act 1878
Relates to	Factory Acts Extension Act 1867; Factory and Workshop (Jews) Act 1871

Status: Repealed

Text of statute as originally enacted

Factory and Workshop Act 1870
- Act of Parliament
- Parliament of the United Kingdom
- Long title: An Act to amend and extend the Acts relating to Factories and Workshops.
- Citation: 33 & 34 Vict. c. 62
- Territorial extent: United Kingdom

Dates
- Royal assent: 9 August 1870
- Commencement: 1 January 1872 (Note: Section 4.)
- Repealed: 1 January 1879
Other legislation
Amends	Factory Acts Extension Act 1867; Workshop Regulation Act 1867
Repeals/revokes	Print Works Act 1845; Print Works Act 1847; Bleaching and Dyeing Works Act 1860; Bleaching Works Act 1862; Bleaching and Dyeing Works Act Amendment Act 1863; Bleaching and Dyeing Works Act Extension Act 1864
Amended by	Factory and Workshop Act 1871; Factory Act 1874
Repealed by	Factory and Workshop Act 1878

Status: Repealed

Text of statute as originally enacted

Factory and Workshop (Jews) Act 1871 (Note: Section 2 of the Factory and Workshop Act 1871 (34 & 35 Vict. c. 104).)
- Act of Parliament
- Parliament of the United Kingdom
- Long title: An Act for exempting persons professing the Jewish religion from penalties in respect of young persons and females professing the said religion working on Sundays.
- Citation: 34 & 35 Vict. c. 19
- Territorial extent: United Kingdom

Dates
- Royal assent: 25 May 1871
- Commencement: 25 May 1871
- Repealed: 1 January 1879
Other legislation
Amended by	Factory and Workshop Act 1871
Repealed by	Factory and Workshop Act 1878
Relates to	Workshop Regulation Act 1867

Status: Repealed

Text of statute as originally enacted

Factory and Workshop Act 1871
- Act of Parliament
- Parliament of the United Kingdom
- Long title: An Act to amend the Acts relating to Factories and Workshops.
- Citation: 34 & 35 Vict. c. 104
- Territorial extent: United Kingdom

Dates
- Royal assent: 21 August 1871
- Commencement: 21 August 1871
- Repealed: 1 January 1879
Other legislation
Amends	Factory Acts Extension Act 1864; Factory Acts Extension Act 1867; Workshop Regulation Act 1867; Factory and Workshop Act 1870; Factory and Workshop (Jews) Act 1871
Amended by	Factory Act 1874
Repealed by	Factory and Workshop Act 1878

Status: Repealed

Text of statute as originally enacted

In 1867 the Factories Act was extended to all establishments employing 50 or more workers by the Factory Acts Extension Act 1867 (30 & 31 Vict. c. 103). The Workshop Regulation Act 1867 (30 & 31 Vict. c. 146) applied to 'workshops' (establishments employing less than 50 workers); it subjected these to requirements similar to those for 'factories' (but less onerous on a number of points e.g.: the hours within which the permitted hours might be worked were less restrictive, there was no requirement for certification of age) but was to be administered by local authorities, rather than the Factory Inspectorate. There was no requirement on local authorities for enforcement (or penalties for non-enforcement) of legislation for workshops. The effectiveness of the regulation of workshops therefore varied from area to area; where it was effective, a blanket ban on Sunday working in workshops was a problem for observant Jews. The Factory and Workshop Act 1870 removed the previous special treatments for factories in the printing, dyeing and bleaching industries; while a short act, the Factory and Workshop Act 1871 (34 & 35 Vict. c. 104), transferred responsibility for regulation of workshops to the Factory Inspectorate, but without an adequate increase in the inspectorates's resources. A separate act, the Factory and Workshop (Jews) Act 1871 (34 & 35 Vict. c. 19) allowed Sunday working by Jews.

== Factories (Health of Women, &c.) Act (1874) ==
Factory Act 1874
- Act of Parliament
- Parliament of the United Kingdom
- Long title: An Act to make better provision for improving the health of women, young persons, and children employed in manufactures, and the education of such children, and otherwise to amend the Factory Acts.
- Citation: 37 & 38 Vict. c. 44
- Territorial extent: United Kingdom

Dates
- Royal assent: 30 July 1874
- Commencement: 1 January 1875 (Note: Section 2.)
- Repealed: 1 January 1879
Other legislation
Amends	Labour of Children, etc., in Factories Act 1833; Regulation of Factories Act 1834; Factory Act 1844; Factories Act 1847; Factory Act 1850; Lace Factory Act 1861; Factory Acts Extension Act 1864; Factory Acts Extension Act 1867; Factory and Workshop Act 1870; Factory and Workshop Act 1871
Repealed by	Factory and Workshop Act 1878

Status: Repealed

Text of statute as originally enacted

The newly-legalised trade unions had as one of their aims a reduction in working hours, both by direct concession by employers and by securing legislation. The 1873 Trades Union Congress (TUC) could congratulate itself on "a general concession of the 'nine-hour day' in all the leading engineering establishments of the kingdom" but regretted that a private member's bill introduced by A. J. Mundella seeking to reduce the hours worked by women and children in textile industries had not succeeded, although the government had responded by setting up a commission on the workings of the Factory Acts. (The TUC had had to support the measure through a committee also containing non-unionists; Lord Shaftesbury (as Ashley had become) had declined to support any measure brought forward on a purely trade union basis.)

Mundella again introduced a nine-hour bill in 1873; he withdrew this when the government did not allow enough time for debate; he reintroduced it in 1874, but withdrew it when the government brought forward its own bill, which became the Factory Act 1874 (37 & 38 Vict. c. 44), also known as the Factories (Health of Women, &c.) Act 1874. This gave women and young persons in textile factories (silk mills now lost their previous special treatment) a working day of ten hours on weekdays (twelve hours broken into sessions of no more than four and a half hours by two meal breaks of at least an hour); on Saturday six hours could be spent on manufacturing processes, and another half-hour on other duties (such as cleaning the workplace and machinery). The provisions for children now applied to 13-year-olds, and (over a two-year period) the minimum age for children was to increase to ten.

=== Shaftesbury's valedictory review ===
Shaftesbury spoke in the Lords Second Reading debate; thinking it might well be his last speech in Parliament on factory reform, he reviewed the changes over the forty-one years it had taken to secure a ten-hour-day, as this bill at last did. In 1833, only two manufacturers had been active supporters of his bill; all but a handful of manufacturers supported the 1874 bill. Economic arguments against reducing working hours had been disproved by decades of experience. Despite the restrictions on hours of work, employment in textile mills had increased (1835; 354,684, of whom 56,455 under 13: in 1871, 880,920 of whom 80,498 under 13), but accidents were half what they had been and 'factory cripples' were no longer seen. In 1835, he asserted, seven-tenths of factory children were illiterate; in 1874 seven-tenths had "a tolerable, if not a sufficient, education". Furthermore, police returns showed "a decrease of 23 percent in the immorality of factory women". The various protective acts now covered over two and a half million people.

During the short-time agitation he had been promised "Give us our rights, and you will never again see violence, insurrection, and disloyalty in these counties." And so it had proved: the Cotton Famine had thrown thousands out of work, with misery, starvation, and death staring them in the face; but, "with one or two trifling exceptions, and those only momentary", order and peace had reigned.

By legislation you have removed manifold and oppressive obstacles that stood in the way of the working man's comfort, progress, and honour. By legislation you have ordained justice, and exhibited sympathy with the best interests of the labourers, the surest and happiest mode of all government. By legislation you have given to the working classes the full power to exercise, for themselves and for the public welfare, all the physical and moral energies that God has bestowed on them; and by legislation you have given them means to assert and maintain their rights; and it will be their own fault, not yours, my Lords, if they do not, with these abundant and mighty blessings, become a wise and an understanding people.

== Factory and Workshop Act 1878 (the Consolidation Act) ==
The Factory and Workshop Act 1878 (41 & 42 Vict. c. 16) consolidated and repealed 16 previous factory acts.

== Factory and Workshop Act 1891 ==
Factory and Workshop Act 1891 (Note: Section 41.)
- Act of Parliament
- Parliament of the United Kingdom
- Long title: An Act to amend the Law relating to Factories and Workshops.
- Citation: 54 & 55 Vict. c. 75
- Territorial extent: United Kingdom

Dates
- Royal assent: 5 August 1891
- Commencement: 1 January 1892 (Note: Section 40.)
- Repealed: 23 May 1950
Other legislation
Amends	Factory and Workshop Act 1878; Factory and Workshop Act 1883
Repeals/revokes	Factory and Workshops Act 1878 Amendment (Scotland) Act 1888
Amended by	Factory and Workshop Act 1895
Repealed by	Factory and Workshop Act 1901; Statute Law Revision Act 1950
Relates to	Births and Deaths Registration Acts 1836; Metropolitan Building Act 1855; Public Health (Scotland) Act 1867; Holidays Extension Act 1875; Public Health Act 1875; Cotton Cloth Factories Act 1889; Public Health (London) Act 1891; Cotton Cloth Factories Act 1897

Status: Repealed

Text of statute as originally enacted

The Factory and Workshop Act 1891 (54 & 55 Vict. c. 75), under the heading 'Conditions of Employment' introduced two considerable additions to previous legislation: the first is the prohibition on employers to employ women within four weeks after confinement (childbirth); the second the raising the minimum age at which a child can be set to work from ten to eleven.

== Factory and Workshop Act 1895 ==
The main article gives an overview of the state of Factory Act legislation in Edwardian Britain under the Factory and Workshop Acts 1878 to 1895 (the collective title of the Factory and Workshop Act 1878 (41 & 42 Vict. c. 16), the Factory and Workshop Act 1883 (46 & 47 Vict. c. 53), the Cotton Cloth Factories Act 1889 (52 & 53 Vict. c. 62), the Factory and Workshop Act 1891 (54 & 55 Vict. c. 75) and the Factory and Workshop Act 1895 (58 & 59 Vict. c. 37).)

== Factory and Workshop Act 1901 ==
The Factory and Workshop Act 1901 (1 Edw. 7. c. 22) raised the minimum working age to 12. The act also introduced legislation regarding the education of children, meal times, and fire escapes. Children could also take up a full-time job at the age of 13 years old.

== Review in 1910 ==
By 1910, Sidney Webb reviewing the cumulative effect of century of factory legislation felt able to write:

The system of regulation which began with the protection of the tiny class of pauper apprentices in textile mills now includes within its scope every manual worker in every manufacturing industry. From the hours of labour and sanitation, the law has extended to the age of commencing work, protection against accidents, mealtimes and holidays, the methods of remuneration, and in the United Kingdom as well as in the most progressive of English-speaking communities, to the rate of wages itself. The range of Factory Legislation has, in fact, in one country or another, become co-extensive with the conditions of industrial employment. No class of manual-working wage-earners, no item in the wage-contract, no age, no sex, no trade or occupation, is now beyond its scope. This part, at any rate, of Robert Owen's social philosophy has commended itself to the practical judgment of the civilised world. It has even, though only towards the latter part of the nineteenth century, converted the economists themselves – converted them now to a "legal minimum wage" – and the advantage of Factory Legislation is now as soundly "orthodox" among the present generation of English, German, and American professors as "laisser-faire" was to their predecessors. ... Of all the nineteenth century inventions in social organisation, Factory Legislation is the most widely diffused.

Webb also commented on the gradual (accidentally almost Fabian) way this transformation had been achieved

The merely empirical suggestions of Dr. Thomas Percival and the Manchester Justices of 1784 and 1795, and the experimental legislation of the elder Sir Robert Peel in 1802, were expanded by Robert Owen in 1815 into a general principle of industrial government, which came to be applied in tentative instalments by successive generations of Home Office administrators. ... This century of experiment in Factory Legislation affords a typical example of English practical empiricism. We began with no abstract theory of social justice or the rights of man. We seem always to have been incapable even of taking a general view of the subject we were legislating upon. Each successive statute aimed at remedying a single ascertained evil. It was in vain that objectors urged that other evils, no more defensible existed in other trades, or among other classes, or with persons of ages other than those to which the particular Bill applied. Neither logic nor consistency, neither the over-nice consideration of even-handed justice nor the Quixotic appeal of a general humanitarianism, was permitted to stand in the way of a practical remedy for a proved wrong. That this purely empirical method of dealing with industrial evils made progress slow is scarcely an objection to it. With the nineteenth century House of Commons no other method would have secured any progress at all.

== Factories Act 1937 ==
The Factories Act 1937 (1 Edw. 8. & 1 Geo. 6. c. 67) consolidated and amended the Factory and Workshop Acts from 1901 to 1929. It was introduced to the House of Commons by the Home Secretary, Sir John Simon, on 29 January 1937 and given royal assent on 30 July.

== Factories Act 1959 ==
Factories Act 1959 (Note: Section 34(1).)
- Act of Parliament
- Parliament of the United Kingdom
- Long title: An Act to amend the Factories Acts, 1937 and 1948, and make further provision as to the health, safety and welfare of persons employed in factories or in premises or operations to which those Acts apply; to revoke Regulation 59 of the Defence (General) Regulations, 1939, and for connected purposes.
- Citation: 7 & 8 Eliz. 2. c. 67
- Territorial extent: England and Wales; Scotland; (Note: Section 34(4).)

Dates
- Royal assent: 29 July 1959
- Commencement: 1 February 1960: in part (Note: The Factories Act 1959 (Commencement No. 1) Order 1959.); 1 August 1960: section 18 (Note: The Factories Act 1959 (Commencement No. 2) Order 1960.); 1 January 1961: section 1 (Note: The Factories Act 1959 (Commencement No. 3) Order 1960.); 1 July 1961: section 19 (Note: The Factories Act 1959 (Commencement No. 3) Order 1960.); 1 December 1960: in part (Note: The Factories Act 1959 (Commencement No. 4) Order 1960.); 1 July 1961: section 25 (Note: The Factories Act 1959 (Commencement No. 5) Order 1961.); (Note: Section 34(3).)
- Repealed: 1 April 1962
Other legislation
Amends	Factories Act 1937; Factories Act 1948
Repealed by	Factories Act 1961

Status: Repealed

Text of statute as originally enacted

The Factories Act 1959 (7 & 8 Eliz. 2. c. 67) amended the previous Acts of 1937 and 1948, as well as adding more health, safety and welfare provisions for factory workers. It also revoked regulation 59 of the Defence (General) Regulations 1939 (SR&O 1939/927). The act is dated 29 July 1959.

== Factories Act 1961 ==
The Factories Act 1961 (9 & 10 Eliz. 2. c. 34) consolidated the 1937 and 1959 acts. As of 2008, the Factories Act 1961 is substantially still in force, although workplace health and safety is principally governed by the Health and Safety at Work etc. Act 1974 (c. 37) and regulations made under it.

== See also ==
- Child labour
- Child labour in the British Industrial Revolution
- Factory inspector
- History of labour law in the United Kingdom
- Labour law
- Mines and Collieries Act 1842
- United Kingdom labour law
