= Labour in Cotton Mills Act 1831 =

Act of the Parliament of the United Kingdom

- Act of Parliament
- Parliament of the United Kingdom
- Long title: An Act to repeal the Laws relating to Apprentices and other young Persons employed in Cotton Factories and in Cotton Mills, and to make further Provisions in lieu thereof.
- Citation: 1 & 2 Will. 4. c. 39
- Territorial extent: United Kingdom

Dates
- Royal assent: 15 October 1831
- Commencement: 1 November 1831 (Note: Sections 1 and 2.)
- Repealed: 1 January 1834
Other legislation
Repeals/revokes	See § Repealed enactments
Repealed by	Labour of Children, etc., in Factories Act 1833

Status: Repealed

Text of statute as originally enacted

The Labour in Cotton Mills Act 1831 (1 & 2 Will. 4. c. 39) was an act of the Parliament of the United Kingdom that consolidated enactments related to the employment of children and young persons in cotton mills and factories in the United Kingdom.

== Background ==
By 1831 the employment of children and young persons in cotton mills had already been regulated by five acts passed since 1819. John Cam Hobhouse, who had piloted the Cotton Mills Regulation Act 1825 through Parliament, introduced a further bill to consolidate and strengthen this legislation, telling the House of Commons that it had the support of manufacturers who felt that unless the practice of night working in smaller factories was stopped, it would be impossible for larger factories which observed the existing law to compete with them. Although the bill had originally been intended to extend to all textile mills, the act as passed applied only to cotton mills.

== Provisions ==
Section 2 of the act prohibited the employment of any person under the age of 21 at night, defined as between half past eight in the evening and half past five in the morning, in any cotton mill or factory in the United Kingdom worked by steam or water power, and placed on the occupier the burden of proving that the act had not been contravened. Section 3 limited the hours that could be worked by any person under the age of 18 in such a mill or factory to twelve hours on any day other than a Saturday, and to nine hours on a Saturday, and section 4 required that not less than an hour and a half be allowed for meals each day. Sections 5 to 7 allowed additional hours to be worked, within limits, to make up time lost through a shortage of water power or an accident to machinery. Section 8 prohibited the employment of any child under the age of nine. Section 9 protected an occupier who had relied in good faith on a false certificate of age given by a parent or guardian, while making the person giving the false certificate liable to a penalty. Section 10 disqualified a justice of the peace who was himself a proprietor or occupier of a cotton mill or factory, or the father, son or brother of one, from acting as a justice under the act, and section 11 required the ceilings and interior walls of every such mill or factory to be limewashed once a year. The remaining sections dealt with procedure and enforcement: informations had to be laid within twenty-one days of an offence; a "Time Book" recording the hours worked had to be kept and produced to a justice on request; penalties of not less than £10 nor more than £20 were recoverable for each offence, half to the informant and half to the poor of the parish; and no appeal lay against a conviction under the act. Section 23 declared the act to be a public act.

=== Repealed enactments ===
Section 1 of the act repealed 5 enactments, listed in that section.

Citation	Short title	Description	Extent of repeal
59 Geo. 3. c. 66	Cotton Mills and Factories Act 1819	An Act to make further Provisions for the Regulation of Cotton Mills and Factories, and for the better Preservation of the Health of young Persons employed therein.	The whole act.
60 Geo. 3 & 1 Geo. 4. c. 5	Labour in Cotton Mills, etc. Act 1819	An Act to amend an Act of the last Session of Parliament, to make further Provision for the Regulation of Cotton Mills and Factories, and for the Preservation of the Health of young Persons employed therein.	The whole act.
6 Geo. 4. c. 63	Cotton Mills Regulation Act 1825	An Act to make further Provisions for the Regulation of Cotton Mills and Factories, and for the better Preservation of the Health of young Persons employed therein.	The whole act.
10 Geo. 4. c. 51	Labour in Cotton Mills, etc. Act 1829	An Act to amend the Law relating to the Employment of Children in Cotton Mills and Factories.	The whole act.
10 Geo. 4. c. 63	Labour in Cotton Mills, etc. (No. 2) Act 1829	An Act to render valid an Act to amend the Law relating to the Employment of Children in Cotton Mills and Factories.	The whole act.

== Subsequent developments ==
The whole act was repealed by section 48 of the Labour of Children, etc., in Factories Act 1833 (3 & 4 Will. 4. c. 103), which came into force on 1 January 1834; the repeal did not revive any of the enactments repealed by section 1 of the act.
