= Gilbert James French =

Gilbert James French (1804–1866), was a textile manufacturer and the biographer of Samuel Crompton.

== Early career and the Waverley Novels ==
French was born 18 April 1804 in Edinburgh, where his father is said to have been a "manufacturer". He received a fair education and was apprenticed to a draper. He moved from Edinburgh to Sheffield, and from there to Bolton, where he developed a considerable trade in the textile fabrics of all kinds worn by clergymen and otherwise used in the services of the church. He cultivated a taste for archaeology, especially for ecclesiology, and formed an extensive library.

In July 1840 a communication signed with his initials appeared in the Gentleman's Magazine which contained a sketch of the story of James Annesley, with indications of its resemblance to that of Henry Bertram in Guy Mannering. The sketch was reproduced in Chambers's Edinburgh Journal for 7 March 1841. French expanded this communication in a pamphlet "printed for presentation" in 1855 and entitled Parallel Passages from Two Tales, elucidating the Origin of the Plot of "Guy Mannering".

Beginning on 26 April 1856, he contributed a series of letters to consecutive numbers of the Bolton Chronicle, which he collected and again "printed for presentation" in the same year as An Enquiry into the Origin and Authorship of some of the Waverley Novels. Here French developed, with new facts and illustrations, the old theory, revived by W. J. Fitzpatrick in 1856, that Scott's brother Thomas and his wife were the virtual authors of the earlier Waverley novels.

== Samuel Crompton's biographer ==
In 1852 French promoted the establishment of the Bolton Free Library, and as president of the Bolton Mechanics' Institute from 1857 to 1858 he delivered to its members several lectures. Two of these, on The Life and Times of Samuel Crompton, were expanded into the biography published in 1859. He contributed generously to the support of Crompton's surviving son when old and poor, and he raised a subscription of £200 with which a monument was erected over Crompton's grave in the Bolton parish churchyard. French died at Bolton 4 May 1866.

He was a member of the London Society of Antiquaries and a corresponding member of the Society of Antiquaries of Scotland, and read several papers before the Archaeological Association of Great Britain and Ireland (now called the Royal Archaeological Institute), which appeared in their Transactions.

== Other writings ==
- Practical Remarks on some of the Minor Accessories to the Services of the Church, 1840.
- The Tippets of the Canons Ecclesiastical, 1850.
- Hints on the Arrangement of Colours in Ancient Decorative Art; 2nd edit. 1850.
- Bibliographical Notices of the Church Libraries at Turton and Gorton, bequeathed by Humphrey Chetham, 1855 (vol. xxxviii. of the Chetham Society's publications).
- Remarks on the Mechanical Structure of Cotton Fibre, 1857.
- On the Banners of the Bayeux Tapestry, and some of the earliest Heraldic Charges, 1857.
- An Attempt to Explain the Origin and Meaning of the Early Interlaced Ornamentation found on the Ancient Sculptured Stones of Scotland, Ireland, and the Isle of Man, 1858.
- Decorative Devices for Sunday Schools, 1860.
