= Cotton Mills and Factories Act 1819 =

Act of the Parliament of the United Kingdom regulating child work

- Act of Parliament
- Parliament of the United Kingdom
- Long title: An Act to make further Provisions for the Regulation of Cotton Mills and Factories, and for the better Preservation of the Health of young Persons employed therein.
- Citation: 59 Geo. 3. c. 66
- Introduced by: Sir Robert Peel (Commons)
- Territorial extent: United Kingdom

Dates
- Royal assent: 2 July 1819
- Commencement: 1 January 1820 (Note: Section 1.)
- Repealed: 1 November 1831
Other legislation
Amended by	Labour in Cotton Mills, etc. Act 1819
Repealed by	Labour in Cotton Mills Act 1831
Relates to	Health and Morals of Apprentices Act 1802; Cotton Mills, etc. Act 1825; Labour in Cotton Mills, etc. Act 1829; Labour in Cotton Mills, etc. (No. 2) Act 1829

Status: Repealed

Text of statute as originally enacted

The Cotton Mills and Factories Act 1819 (59 Geo. 3. c. 66) or the Labour in Cotton Mills, etc. Act 1819 was an act of the Parliament of the United Kingdom, which was its first attempt to regulate the hours and conditions of work of children in the cotton industry. It was introduced by the industrialist Sir Robert Peel, who had first introduced a bill on the matter in 1815. The 1815 bill had been instigated by Robert Owen, but the act as passed was much weaker than the 1815 bill; the act forbade the employment of children under 9; children aged 9–16 years were limited to 12 hours' work per day and could not work at night. There was no effective means of its enforcement, but it established the precedent for Parliamentary intervention on conditions of employment which was followed by subsequent Factory Acts.

== Background ==
The Health and Morals of Apprentices Act 1802 (42 Geo. 3. c. 73) had been introduced by Sir Robert Peel to improve conditions for apprentices working in cotton mills. Peel was one of the richest millowners in England, and had become concerned at the poor health of child apprentices working in his mills (which he blamed on 'gross mismanagement' by his subordinates) and in cotton mills in general. Early mills had been water-powered, and hence sited where there was a useful fall of water, rather than where there was an available workforce. Child apprentices had been widely used as a cheap and captive workforce. (Note: In some cases this is more than a figure of speech: apprentices were not allowed to leave the mill at any time) The act required that cotton mills and factories be properly ventilated and basic requirements on cleanliness be met. Apprentices in these premises were to be given a basic education and to attend a religious service at least once a month. They were to be provided with clothing and their working hours were limited to no more than twelve hours a day (excluding meal breaks); they were not to work at night.

The act was not effectively enforced, and did not address the working conditions of 'free children' (children working in mills who were not apprentices). Improvements in the generation of rotary motion by steam engines made steam-powered cotton mills a practical proposition; they were already operating in Manchester in 1795, using free children drawn from the local population. The great advantage parish apprentices had had was that they were tied to the mill, no matter how remote the mill had to be to avail itself of water power. If the mill no longer had to be remote, it became a problem that the mill was tied to the apprentices. Apprentices had to be housed clothed and fed whether or not the mill could sell what they produced; they were in competition with free children whose wages would fall if the mill went on short time ( and might not reflect the full cost of housing clothing and feeding them, since that was incurred whether they were working or not) and who could be discharged if sick, injured or otherwise incapable of work. Consequently, the use of free children came to predominate: the act became largely a dead letter within its limited scope, and inapplicable to most factory children.

In 1819, a Lords Committee heard evidence from a Bolton magistrate who had investigated 29 local cotton mills; 20 had no apprentices but employed a total of 550 children under 14; the other nine mills employed a total of 98 apprentices, and a total of 350 children under 14. Apprentices were mostly found in the larger mills, which had somewhat better conditions; some even worked a 12-hour day or less (the Grant brothers' mill at Tottington worked an 11.5-hour day: "This establishment has perfect ventilation; all the apprentices, and in fact all the children, are healthy, happy, clean, and well clothed; proper and daily attention is paid to their instruction; and they regularly attend divine worship on Sundays."): in other mills children worked up to 15 hours a day in bad conditions (e.g. Gortons and Roberts' Elton mill: "Most filthy; no ventilation; the apprentices and other children ragged, puny, not half clothed, and seemingly not half fed; no instruction of any sort; no human beings can be more wretched").

In 1815, Robert Owen, owner of a prosperous mill at New Lanark approached Peel with a draft Bill to regulate the use of children in the textile industry. Peel agreed to steer the bill through Parliament. Owen's draft was given a First Reading late in the 1815 session (so that copies could be printed and sent out for consultation before the 1816 session; other bills were given similar 'advance notice' First Readings at the end of the 1815 session). In the 1816 session Peel chaired a Commons Committee collecting evidence intended to show the necessity for legislation. Peel did not bring forward a Bill in the 1817 session (because - he explained later - he was ill; he certainly withdrew from business in January 1817). In 1818 he did: the bill got as far as the House of Lords, but lapsed when a General Election was called. In 1819, he again presented a bill; the Lords felt it necessary to set up a Committee of their own to hear evidence on the issue; nonetheless in 1819 an act was finally passed to regulate the working conditions of children working in cotton mills and factories.

== Provisions ==
The act passed in 1819 was only a pale shadow of Owen's draft of 1815. The bill presented in 1815, applied to all children in textile mills and factories; with children under ten were not to be employed; children between ten and eighteen could work no more than ten hours a day, with two hours for mealtimes and half an hour for schooling this made a 12.5 hour day; Magistrates were to be empowered to appoint paid inspectors (to be independent of the mills and factories they inspected); and Inspectors were to be able to demand admission to mills at any time of day.

Meanwhile, the act passed in 1819, only applied to children in cotton mills and factories; with only children under nine to not be employed; children between nine and sixteen could work no more than twelve hours a day (not including mealtimes or schooling); the twelve hours to be worked between 5 a.m. and 9 p.m.; at least half an hour to be allowed for breakfast, and a dinner break of at least an hour to be taken between 11 a.m. and 2 p.m. (an amending act in the next session, the Labour in Cotton Mills, etc. Act 1819 (60 Geo. 3 & 1 Geo. 4. c. 5) amended these limits to 11 a.m. to 4 p.m.); There was no provision for routine inspection of mills; if two witnesses gave information upon oath that a mill was breaking the act, local magistrates could send their clerk (or a paid deputy) to inspect the mill. If the mill was indeed breaking the act, then it was liable to further inspections without fresh informations being laid.

The act therefore did little more than establish the principle of government intervention and set forth a relatively unambitious and virtually unenforceable standard.

Labour in Cotton Mills, etc. Act 1819
- Act of Parliament
- Parliament of the United Kingdom
- Long title: An Act to amend an Act of the last Session of Parliament, to make further Provision for the Regulation of Cotton Mills and Factories, and for the Preservation of the Health of young Persons employed therein.
- Citation: 60 Geo. 3 & 1 Geo. 4. c. 5
- Territorial extent: United Kingdom

Dates
- Royal assent: 23 December 1819
- Commencement: 23 December 1819 (Note: The Acts of Parliament (Commencement) Act 1793.)
- Repealed: 1 November 1831
Other legislation
Amends	Cotton Mills and Factories Act 1819
Repealed by	Labour in Cotton Mills Act 1831

Status: Repealed

Text of statute as originally enacted

The Labour in Cotton Mills, etc. Act 1819 (60 Geo. 3 & 1 Geo. 4. c. 5) was passed in December 1819. It was introduced by Sir Robert Peel, who explained that "the object of the amendment was, when any accident by fire or otherwise took place in a factory, to allow the people thrown out of employment by such accident, to work by night, in such part of the works as were not destroyed, till the accident was made good. If this was not allowed, the worst consequences must arise, from letting loose on society a number of people without employment." (Contemporary newspaper reports indicate that this followed a fire at one of the mills at New Lanark, and that Peel indicated that unless the act was passed by the start of January, many of the workers there would become unemployed.) (Note: The act is described as 'of a retrograde tendency' by Hutchins and Harrison, who fail to indicate its connection with New Lanark and their progressive hero Robert Owen)

== Objections ==
Robert Owen blamed the failure to get an act closely matching his bill passed on Peel's failure to move swiftly before opposition had a chance to get organised. However, the 1815 bill was extremely ambitious and the dates at which subsequent factory legislation matched its provisions (paid inspectors 1833 act; ten-hour day 1847 act, minimum age ten 1874 act) do not suggest that if passed it would have been regarded as a definitive settlement. Objections to the much weaker 1819 bill were still strong and varied; a contemporary pro-bill pamphlet listed (and to its own satisfaction rebutted) eight different arguments against the bill, most of which were to continue to be urged against subsequent factory legislation for many years:

1. that nothing in the working conditions of mill children showed any need for legislation
2. that the bill is inquisitorial, interferes with free labour, with parental authority, and in effect with the labour of adults, because the adults cannot work without the children (Note: 'Inquisitorial' because agents of government could demand access to a man's property, 'interfering with free labour (sic)' because the orthodoxy of the age was that man and master should reach an agreement on pay and conditions without outside interference "The property which every man has in his own labour, as it is the original foundation of all other property, so it is the most sacred and inviolable. The patrimony of a poor man lies in the strength and dexterity of his hands; and to hinder him from employing this strength and dexterity in what manner he thinks proper, without injury to his neighbour, is a plain violation of his most sacred property." Adam Smith Wealth of Nations, quoted by Joseph Hume (a Whig): William Huskisson (a Tory) endorsed those sentiments (Smith's quote (Wealth of Nations Book I Chapter 10, part ii) was originally aimed against artificial restrictions (such as apprenticeships) on men entering a trade))
3. that the bill would make British industry uncompetitive on the world market
4. that the bill created a dangerous precedent "If eleven hours actual labour be fixed as a maximum in Cotton Mills, how can Parliament refuse to impose a similar maximum for all other trades?"
5. that there was no need for legislation; enlightened millowners already saw the need for good working conditions; given time the rest would also
6. that restricting working hours was unfair to water-powered mills (Note: Not because water flowed past the mill 24 hours a day, but because it didn't; flow was irregular and should be used whenever available)
7. that restricting the hours of children would mean millowners would employ men rather than children – rather than benefitting children the bill would make them unemployable
8. that reducing the hours mills were operated would have a bad effect on the morals of the millworkers (Note: Both in the obvious sense that one hour less in the mill would be one hour more drinking time and in a more political sense that it was the discipline of the cotton industry that kept the lower classes of the cotton towns under control (1819 was the year of the Peterloo Massacre). Mancunian supporters of the 1819 bill also had to defend themselves from the claim that the talk about the bill had unsettled the millworkers and was therefore responsible for recent strikes (then particularly alarming because illegal under the Combination Act))

== Subsequent developments ==
The whole act, as well as the Labour in Cotton Mills, etc. Act 1819 (60 Geo. 3 & 1 Geo. 4. c. 5), were repealed by section 1 of the Labour in Cotton Mills Act 1831 (1 & 2 Will. 4. c. 39).

== Bibliography ==
- Hutchins, B. L.; Harrison, A. (1911). A History of Factory Legislation. P. S. King & Son.
