= Sadler (name) =

Sadler is an English and German (together with Saedler, Sädler) surname, derived from the profession of making saddles. Notable people with the name include:

== Surname ==
- Anthony Sadler, American student who thwarted 2015 Thalys train attack
- Arthur Lindsay Sadler (1882–1970), British Japanese translator and professor
- Barry Sadler (1940–1989), American military veteran, author, actor, and singer-songwriter
- Benjamin Sadler (born 1971), German actor
- Casey Sadler (born 1990), American baseball player
- Catt Sadler (born 1974), correspondent for E! News
- Charlie Sadler (born 1949), American football coach and player
- Christine Sadler (1902–1983), American author, journalist, and magazine editor
- Daniel K. Sadler (1882–1960), American lawyer and justice on the New Mexico Supreme Court
- Darren Sadler (born 1980), British strongman
- David Sadler (disambiguation), multiple people
- Doc Sadler (born 1960), American college basketball coach
- Donnie Sadler (born 1975), American baseball player
- Ellen Sadler (1859 – after 1901), British girl who purportedly fell asleep and did not wake for nine years
- Elliott Sadler (born 1975), American NASCAR race car driver
- Frank P. Sadler (1872–1931), American lawyer and politician
- Henry Sadler (c.1538–1618), English politician
- Hermie Sadler (born 1969), American NASCAR race car driver
- Hope Sadler (1882–1931), American football player
- James Sadler (disambiguation), multiple people
- Jim Sadler (1886–1975), Australian rules footballer
- Joey Sadler (1914–2007), New Zealand rugby union player
- John Sadler (disambiguation), multiple people
- Joseph Sadler (c. 1839–c. 1889), British professional rower
- József Sadler (1791–1849), Hungarian physician and botanist
- Laura Sadler (1980–2003), English actress
- Marilyn Sadler, American children's writer
- Mat Sadler (born 1985), English footballer
- Matthew Sadler (born 1974), English chess grandmaster and chess writer
- Michael Sadler (disambiguation), multiple people, including:
  - Michael Sadler (educationist) (1861–1943), British historian, educationalist and university administrator
  - Michael Thomas Sadler (1780–1835), British Tory Member of Parliament
- Nicholas Sadler, American actor
- Rahni Sadler (born 1972), Australian television reporter
- Ralph Sadler (1507–1587), English statesman
- Ray Sadler (born 1980), American baseball player
- Reinhold Sadler (1848–1906), American politician; Governor of Nevada
- Robert Sadler (1846–1923), Australian politician
- Robin Sadler (born 1955), Canadian ice hockey defenceman
- Samuel Sadler (1842–1911), English industrialist and politician associated with the town of Middlesbrough
- Ted Sadler (1910–1992), English rugby footballer
- Thomas Sadler (disambiguation), multiple people
- William Sadler (disambiguation), multiple people

== Given name ==
- Sadler Rogers (1831–1913), American builder and farmer

== See also ==
- Saddler (disambiguation)
