= Turville (disambiguation) =

Turville is a village and civil parish in Buckinghamshire, England.

Turville may also refer to:

== People ==
- David Sainsbury, Baron Sainsbury of Turville (born 1940), British politician, businessman and philanthropist
- Frank Turville (1907–1984), Canadian football player
- Geoffrey de Turville (died 1250), Irish judge and cleric
- Larry Turville (1949–2020), American tennis player

== Places ==
- Acton Turville, a parish in South Gloucestershire, England
- Eastleach Turville, a village in Gloucestershire, England
- Turville Grange, a house in Buckinghamshire, England
- Turville Hill, a Site of Special Scientific Interest in Buckinghamshire, England
- Weston Turville, a village in Buckinghamshire, England

== Other ==
- The Turville, a listed former public house in Manchester, England
