= Sadler =

Sadler may refer to:

- Sadler (surname), people with the surname Sadler
- James Sadler and Sons Ltd English pottery manufacturer
- Sadler, Kentucky, United States; an unincorporated community
- Sadler, Texas, United States; a city
- Sadler report, 19th century British report on child labor

== See also ==
- Saddler (disambiguation)
- Sadleir (disambiguation)
