= Sadlier =

Sadlier is a surname. Notable people with the surname include:

- Anna T. Sadlier (1854-1932), Canadian writer, translator
- Clifford Sadlier (1892–1964), Australian Victoria Cross recipient
- Kieran Sadlier (born 1994), Irish footballer
- Mary Anne Sadlier (1820–1903), Irish writer
- Richard Sadlier (born 1979), Irish footballer
- Tom Sadlier (1890–1960), Australian rules footballer
- William Sadlier (bishop) (1867–1935), New Zealand Anglican bishop

== See also ==
- Sadlier baronets, a title in the Baronetage of England
- William H. Sadlier, an American publishing company
- Sadliers
- Sadleir (disambiguation)
