= James Sadler =

James Sadler may refer to:

- James Sadler (balloonist) (1753–1828), first English balloonist
- Sir James Hayes Sadler (1827–1910), British civil servant
- James Sadler (cricketer) (1830–1865), English cricketer
- Sir James Hayes Sadler (colonial administrator) (1851–1922), Colonial administrator, son of above
- James C. Sadler (1920–2005), American meteorologist
- James Robert Sadler, birth name of British actor Jerry Desmonde (1908–1967)
- James Sadler and Sons Ltd, English pottery manufacturer
- James Thomas Sadler (1837–?), English merchant sailor

== See also ==
- Jim Sadler (1886–1975), Australian rules footballer
