= Thomas Sadler =

Thomas Sadler may refer to:

- Thomas Vincent Faustus Sadler (1604–1681), Roman Catholic missionary in England and spiritual author
- Thomas Sadler (Unitarian) (1822–1891), English minister
- Thomas William Sadler (1831–1896), U.S. Representative from Alabama
- Thomas Sadler (cricketer) (1892–1973), English cricketer
