= Sadleir =

Sadleir may refer to:

== People with the surname ==
- Franc Sadleir (1775–1851), Irish academic
- James Sadleir (c.1815 – 1881), Irish financier and politician
- John Sadleir (1813–1856), Irish financier and politician
- Lynette Sadleir (b. 1963), Canadian-born swimmer
- Michael Sadleir (1888–1957), British author and bibliophile
- Ralph Sadleir (1579–1661), English landowner
- Thomas Sadleir (died 1607) (c.1536–1607), English landowner and politician
- Thomas Sadleir (1882–1957), Irish genealogist and herald
- Lionel Sadleir-Jackson (1876–1932), British army officer

== Places ==
- Sadleir, New South Wales

== See also ==
- Sadleirian Professor of Pure Mathematics, University of Cambridge
- Saddler (disambiguation)
- Sadler (disambiguation)
- Sadlier, a surname
