= Ibstone =

Village in Buckinghamshire, England

Coordinates: 51.6344°N 0.9093°W

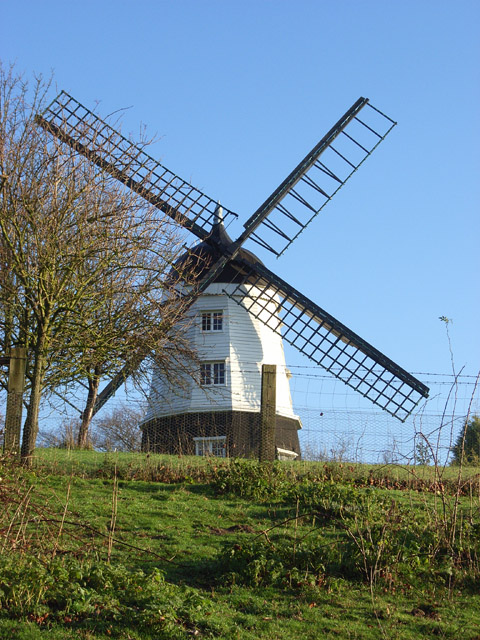
- Cobstone Windmill, Ibstone

- Location within Buckinghamshire
- Population: 242 (2011 Census)
- OS grid reference: SU755935
- Civil parish: Ibstone
- Unitary authority: Buckinghamshire
- Ceremonial county: Buckinghamshire
- Region: South East
- Country: England
- Sovereign state: United Kingdom
- Post town: HIGH WYCOMBE
- Postcode district: HP14
- Dialling code: 01491
- Police: Thames Valley
- Fire: Buckinghamshire
- Ambulance: South Central
- UK Parliament: Wycombe
- Website: Ibstone Parish Council

Ibstone (previously Ipstone) is a village and civil parish in Buckinghamshire, England. The village is in the Chiltern Hills on the border with Oxfordshire, about 2 miles (3.2 km) south of Stokenchurch. The population of the parish at the 2011 Census was 242, an increase from 237 at the 2001 Census.

The village name is Anglo-Saxon in origin and means 'Hibba's boundary stone', referring to the boundary with Oxfordshire. At the time of King Edward the Confessor the village was in the possession of Tovi, thane of the king, and was called Hibestanes.

The medieval Church of England parish church dedicated to Saint Nicholas stands separate from the rest of the village; there is evidence that the southern end of the village near the church was more heavily populated before the Black Death in the 14th century. A local story says that the church was originally built near the common but the Devil moved it to its present location.

The village includes Cobstone Windmill. The windmill was built around 1816 and is unusual in that it is a twelve-sided smock mill, still housing some of its original machinery. It was converted into a private residence during the 1950s and then refurbished after 1971. It was also used as Caractacus Potts' workshop in the 1968 film Chitty Chitty Bang Bang and seen in The New Avengers episode "The House of Cards". The actress Hayley Mills and her film producer husband Roy Boulting owned the windmill and lived there in the early 1970s. The politician Barbara Castle also lived in the village. The common is an area of open access land, and the standing stone (OS GR SU7507 9371) was erected for the Millennium year 2000.

"Ibstone" is the name given to a hymn tune composed in 1875 by Maria Tiddeman (1837–1915) for the hymn "Thy way, not mine, O Lord" by Horatius Bonar. She lived in nearby Fingest from the mid-1860s.

== St Nicholas' Church ==
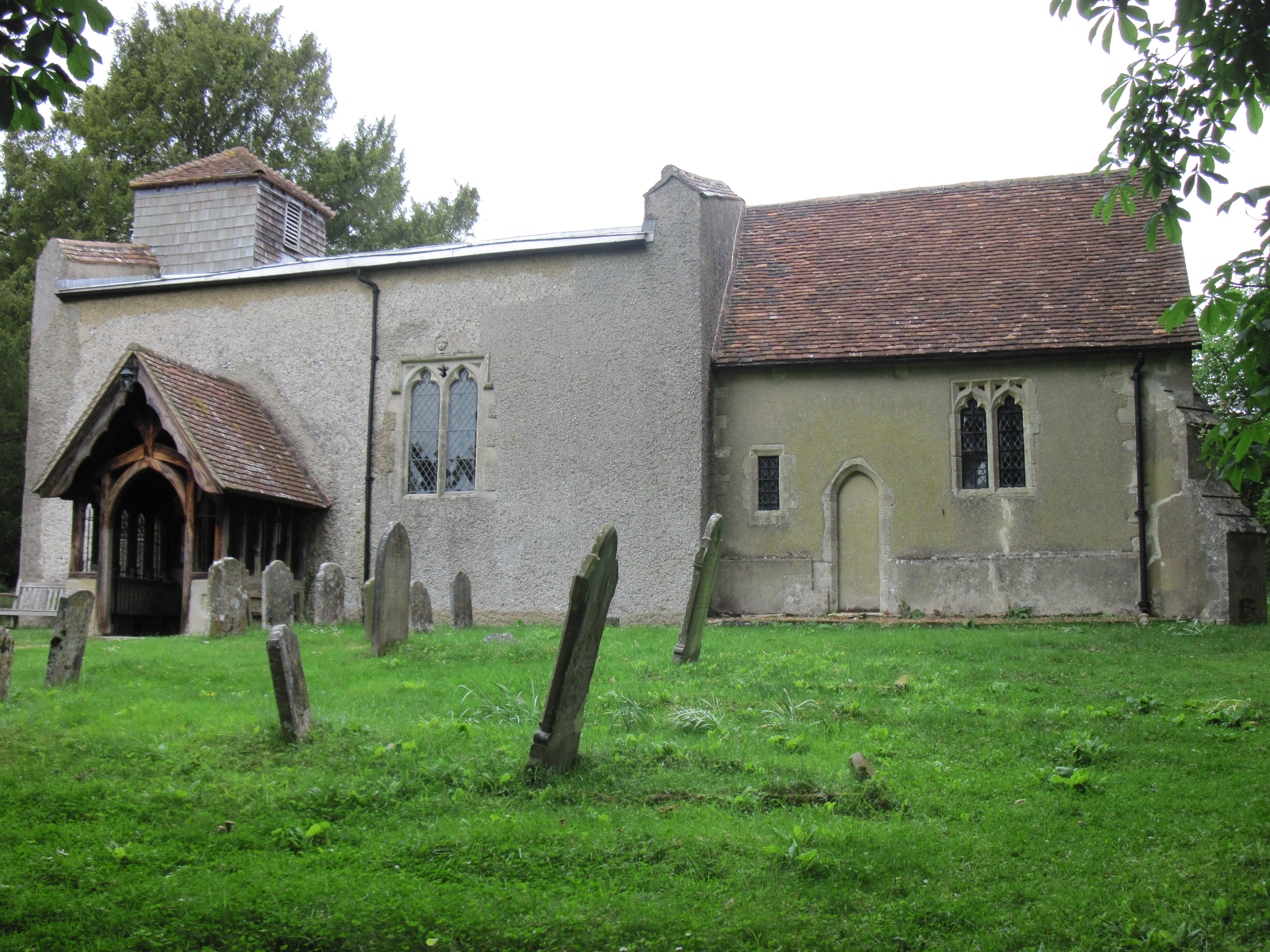
St Nicholas's Church from the south

Although there has probably been a church in Ibstone for more than a thousand years; the present nave of the building dates from about 1125 with the chancel about a century later. The simple tub-shaped stone baptismal font is 12th century and the wooden pulpit from the 14th or 15th century. A beam in the roof is dated 1777 and a wooden west gallery dates from about 1800. At the west end, a squat bell turret houses two 18th century bells which were restored by the Whitechapel Bell Foundry in 1986. A large male yew tree, (Taxus baccata), stands in the churchyard; it is at least 700 years old and is said to predate the church. The church is a Grade II* listed building

== See also ==
- Wormsley Park
