= Michael Sadler =

Michael Sadler may refer to:

- Michael Thomas Sadler (1780–1835), radical British Tory Member of Parliament
- Michael Sadler (educationist) (1861–1943), British historian, educationalist and university administrator
- Michael Sadler, Welsh-born musician, best known for his work with the band Saga
- Mike Sadler (1920–2024), British army officer

== See also ==
- Michael Sadleir (1888–1957), British publisher, novelist, book collector and bibliographer, born Sadler
