= David Sadler =

David Sadler may refer to:

- David Sadler (footballer) (born 1946), former English footballer
- David Sadler (geographer) (born 1960), British geographer and researcher
- David Sadler (yacht designer) (1921–2014), British yacht designer

== See also ==
- Sadler (name)
