= Turville =

Village in Buckinghamshire, England

Coordinates: 51.6137°N 0.8932°W

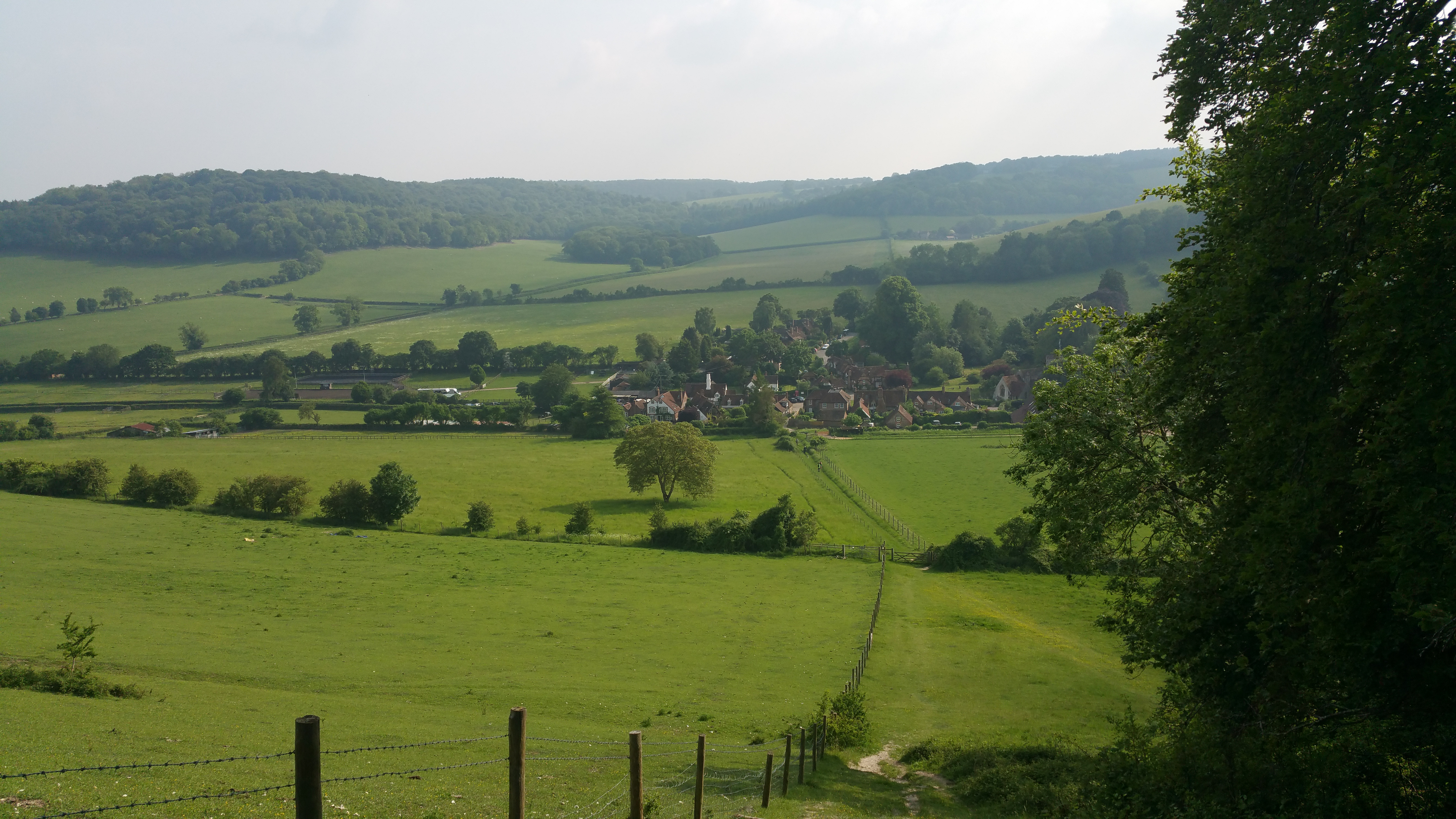
- View from a hill overlooking Turville

- Location within Buckinghamshire
- Population: 340 (2011 Census)
- OS grid reference: SU765915
- Civil parish: Turville
- Unitary authority: Buckinghamshire
- Ceremonial county: Buckinghamshire
- Region: South East
- Country: England
- Sovereign state: United Kingdom
- Post town: HENLEY-ON-THAMES
- Postcode district: RG9
- Dialling code: 01491
- Police: Thames Valley
- Fire: Buckinghamshire
- Ambulance: South Central
- UK Parliament: Wycombe

Turville is a village and civil parish in Buckinghamshire, England. It is in the Chiltern Hills, 5 miles (8.0 km) west of High Wycombe, 6 miles (9.7 km) east-southeast of Watlington, 7 miles (11 km) north of Henley-on-Thames and 2 miles (3 km) from the Oxfordshire border. The name is Anglo-Saxon in origin and means 'dry field'. It was recorded in the Anglo-Saxon Chronicle in 796 as Thyrefeld.

The manor of Turville once belonged to the abbey at St Albans but was seized by the Crown in the dissolution of the monasteries in 1547. The manor house has since been rebuilt as Turville Park and was held by the Hoare Nairne family for most of the 20th century. The present incumbent of the manor is Lord Sainsbury. Turville was home to Ellen Sadler, who fell asleep in 1871, aged eleven, and purportedly did not wake for nine years, becoming known as the "Sleeping Girl of Turville". The case attracted international attention from newspapers, medical professionals and the public.

Rumours persist in the region that Sadler was visited by royalty for a laying on of hands. The village pub is the Bull and Butcher. Turville is well known for its carrots and is informally referred to as the carrot capital of the United Kingdom. Turville Hill is a Site of Special Scientific Interest and includes Cobstone Windmill.

== Notable people ==
- Geoffrey de Turville (died 1250), Lord Chancellor of Ireland
- Charles François Dumouriez (1739-1823), French royalist general
- Ellen Sadler (1859-1901), "The Sleeping Girl of Turville", tourist attraction
- Lord Sainsbury of Turville (born 1940), businessman, politician and philanthropist
- Sir John Mortimer, (1923-2009), Barrister, playwright, novelist

== Transport ==
There is no public transport (either bus or rail) serving the village.

== In literature ==
- Edward Mayhew, one of the two main characters in Ian McEwan's On Chesil Beach, comes from Turville.

== Filming location ==
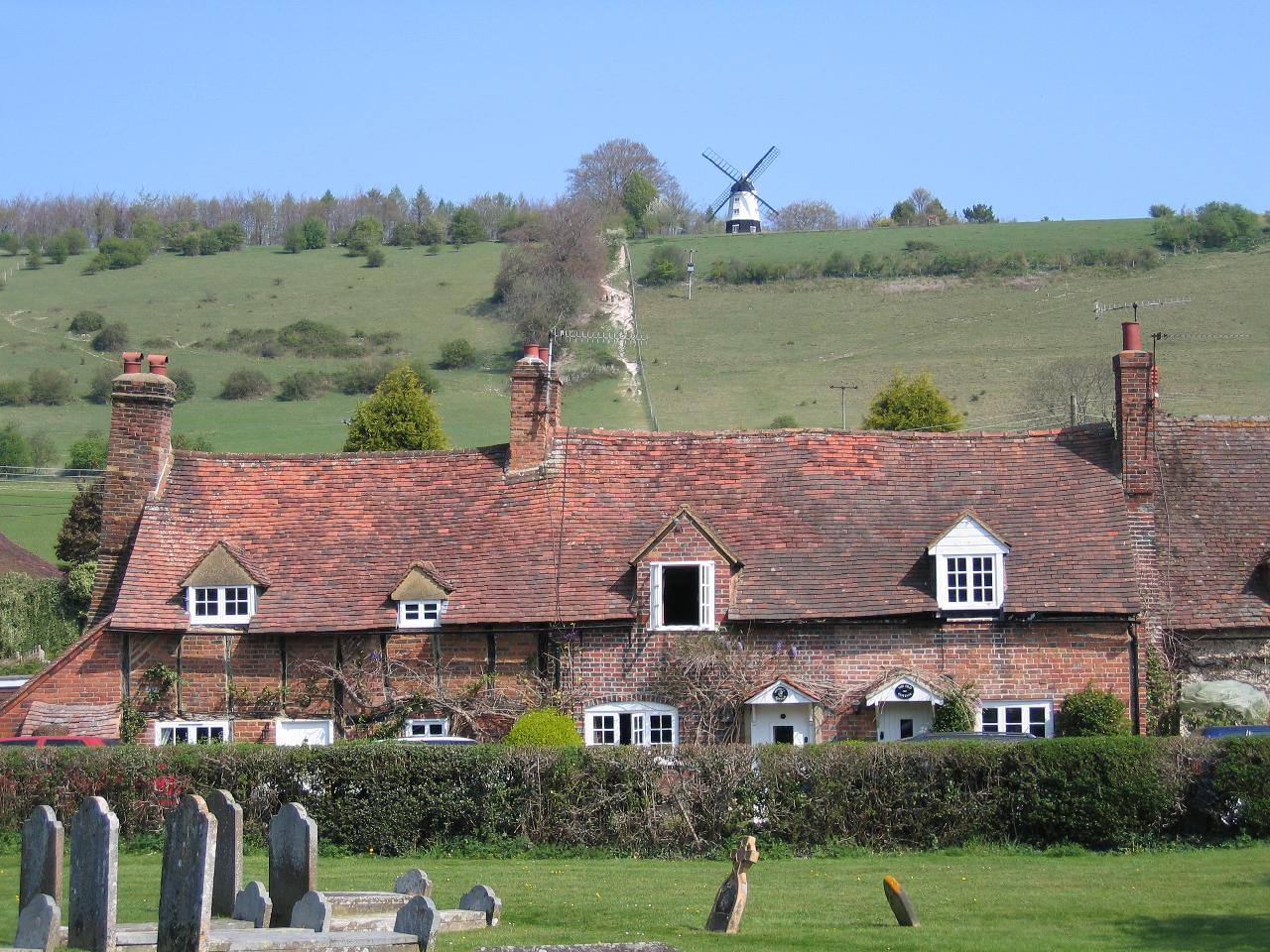
Houses near St Mary's churchyard, Cobstone Windmill in background.

Turville is an English village, with several historic stone and timber houses around a village green. It has thus been used a filming location on numerous occasions:

The 1942 Ealing Studios film Went the Day Well?, in which German paratroopers invade a small English village, was filmed in Turville, as were many of the scenes from the 1963 comedy film Father Came Too! The whole of The Large Rope, a 1953 B-movie starring Donald Houston, was filmed in the village, as were the dream scene in Bride and Prejudice and a brief scene in I Capture the Castle. In June 2012 filming for the live-action Disney film Maleficent took place just outside the village. Cobstone Windmill in the neighbouring parish of Ibstone, used in Chitty Chitty Bang Bang, overlooks the village of Turville.

Many of the outdoor scenes of television film Goodnight Mister Tom were filmed in Turville. Scenes have also been shot in the village for Midsomer Murders, Lewis, Marple, Foyle's War, Little Britain, the 2008 Christmas special of Jonathan Creek, the British drama An Education and the 2009 BBC adaptation of The Day of the Triffids. The fourth episode of the first series of Killing Eve was shot in the village, with an armed ambush and car chase shot in the village centre and on the surrounding country roads. The village was the location for outdoor scenes in the sitcom The Vicar of Dibley. In the series, the church of St Mary the Virgin was named St Barnabus [sic].

The music video for the song Apparition by Stealing Sheep was shot in the village.
