= Sadler report =

1833 British government report on child labour

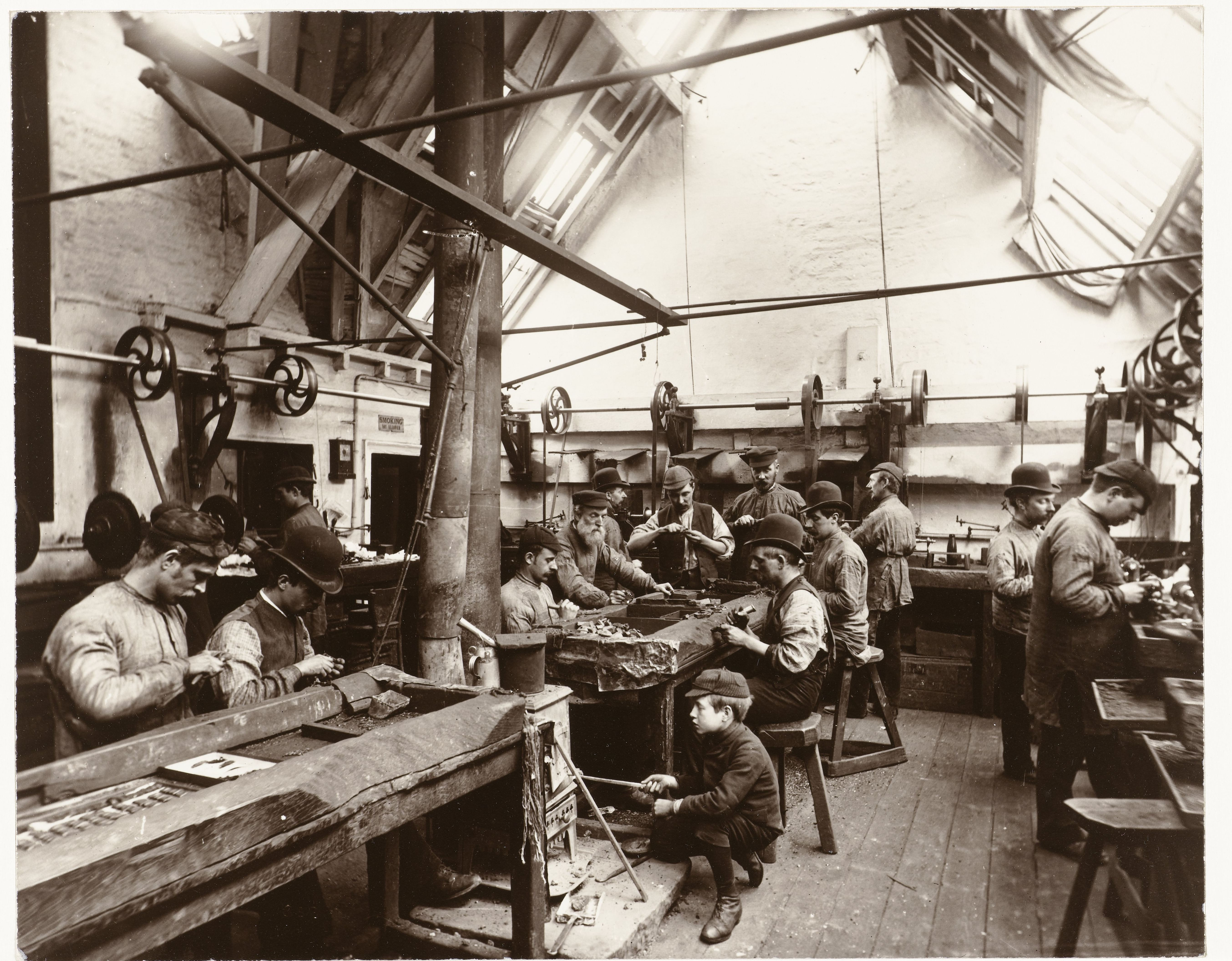
Factory workers, including children, in England, c. 1900–45

This is an article about a 19th-century British report. It should not be confused with the Sadler Commission, an investigation into Indian University education at the end of the First World War.

The Sadler Report, also known as the Report of the Select Committee on Factory Children's Labour (Parliamentary Papers 1831–32, volume XV) or "the report of Mr Sadler's Committee," (Note: the standard phrase used by the Evening Standard in editorials from the start of January 1833 onward; a search in the British Newspaper Archive shows instances can be found in other papers eg. There are no hits for the phrase 'Sadler report') was a report written in 1832 by Michael Sadler, the chairman of a UK parliamentary committee considering a bill that limited the hours of work of children in textile mills and factories. In committee hearings carried out between the passage of the Reform Act 1832 and Parliament's subsequent dissolution, Sadler had elicited testimony from factory workers (current and former), concerned medical men, and other bystanders. The report highlighted the poor working conditions and excessive working hours for children working in the factories. Time (and Sadler) prevented balancing or contrary evidence from being called before Parliament was dissolved.

The committee report was published early in 1833. A mid-20th-century historian described it as "a mass of evidence, constituting a most formidable indictment of factory conditions... It is impossible not to be staggered by the revelations of human misery and degradation – impossible not to be moved by the dreadful stories of children and young persons (and adults, too, for that matter) who were bullied and cursed and tormented, pushed around and knocked about by those placed in authority over them." There was widespread public outcry at the conditions depicted by the testimony heard. Parliament declined to legislate on the basis of the report. Even Sadler's parliamentary friends, such as Lord Morpeth, conceded that the proceedings of the committee were irregular and its choice of witnesses unbalanced. Instead, Parliament voted for a fresh inquiry through a Factory Commission, which visited the principal manufacturing districts and took evidence on oath (unlike the select committee).

The report of the commission did not set out to directly refute testimony presented by Sadler, but it reached conclusions at variance with Sadler's report on many points. However, it concluded that children were working excessively long hours and government intervention to regulate child labour in textile trades was therefore called for. This required both restrictions on hours of work and a new organization for enforcing them. The consequent Factory Act 1833 and its establishment of the UK Factory Inspectorate is often taken to mark the start of modern factory legislation in the UK. The report of Sadler's Committee therefore indirectly led to an important advance in factory legislation.

== History ==
On 16 March 1832 Sadler proposed the Second Reading of a Bill to limit the workday for textile workers under the age of 18 to ten hours. The bill also involved a ban on labour for children 9 years old and younger, an eight-hour day on Saturday, and a ban on night working for children under the age of 21.

Although Sadler had asserted at earlier stages that the need for such legislation was so urgent and so obvious that there was no need for a Select Committee to gather evidence relating to the Bill, at Second Reading he accepted that the Bill should be considered by such a committee. One was duly formed, with Sadler as the chairman; the committee also included John Cam Hobhouse, Thomas Fowell Buxton, Lord Morpeth, Sir Robert Peel, Sir Robert Inglis, and Charles Poulett Thomson. It held its first sitting on 12 April 1832, and took evidence from eighty-nine witnesses in the course of forty-three meetings. About half the witnesses were workers (some of whom, Sadler told the House of Commons, had lost their jobs because they had given evidence).

Sadler attempted (31 July 1832) to progress his Bill without waiting for the committee's report; when this was objected to, he withdrew the Bill. The committee reported the minutes of evidence on 8 August 1832, when they were ordered to be printed. Parliament was dissolved little over a week later, and in the election that followed, Sadler stood at Leeds but failed to be elected. Early in 1833 the contents of the committee's report began to appear in local and national papers.

== Report ==
One early history of factory legislation described the testimony presented in Sadler's report as "one of the most valuable collections of evidence on industrial conditions that we possess" and excerpts from the testimony are given in many source books on the Industrial Revolution and factory reform and on multiple websites, together with commentary drawing the intended conclusions.

However, critics such as William Harold Hutt have pointed to – and revived – contemporary criticism of the report. Even Sadler's parliamentary friends, such as Lord Morpeth, conceded that the proceedings of the Committee were irregular and its choice of witnesses unbalanced. Evidence given to the committee was not given on oath, and it remains unclear (and controversial) to what extent the evidence heard from former mill-children and the parents of mill children was true, and if true to what extent typical. Whilst these caveats cannot be ignored "Critics have alleged that some of the evidence was biased, incomplete, sometimes inaccurate or even deliberately misleading, and it is true that a good deal of it referred to conditions that had long been ameliorated...When every allowance has been made for exaggerations and omissions and the rest, the 'report' stands as one of the classic documents of British social history".

It painted a picture of overwork, physical severity, misery and fear as the lot of a mill-child in an unregulated mill. To give one example of the evidence to that effect, and the questioning that elicited it: Matthew Crabtree, now 22 and a blanket manufacturer, had been a factory child between the ages of eight and twelve. He had worked from 6 a.m. to 8 p.m. with an hour for a meal at noon (there was no breakfast break); when trade was brisk work had started an hour earlier and finished an hour later. He had lived about 2 miles from the mill:

Question	Answer
During those long hours of labour could you be punctual; how did you awake?	I seldom did awake spontaneously; I was most generally awoke or lifted out of bed, sometimes asleep, by my parents
Were you always in time?	No
What was the consequence if you had been too late?	I was most commonly beaten
Severely?	Very severely, I thought
In those mills is chastisement towards the latter part of the day going on perpetually?	Perpetually
So that you can hardly be in a mill without hearing constant crying?	Never an hour, I believe
Do you think that if the overlooker were naturally a humane person it would still be found necessary for him to beat the children, in order to keep up their attention and vigilance at the termination of those extraordinary days of labour?	Yes; the machine turns off a regular quantity of cardings, and of course, they must keep as regularly to their work the whole of the day; they must keep with the machine, and therefore however humane the slubber may be, as he must keep up with the machine or be found fault with, he spurs the children to keep up also by various means but that which he commonly resorts to is to strap them when they become drowsy
At the time when you were beaten for not keeping up with your work, were you anxious to have done it if you possibly could?	Yes; the dread of being beaten if we could not keep up with our work was a sufficient impulse to keep us to it if we could
When you got home at night after this labour, did you feel much fatigued?	Very much so
Had you any time to be with your parents, and to receive instruction from them?	No.
What did you do?	All that we did when we got home was to get the little bit of supper that was provided for us and go to bed immediately. If the supper had not been ready directly, we should have gone to sleep while it was preparing; which took its toll the morning after.
Did you not, as a child, feel it a very grievous hardship to be roused so soon in the morning?	I did.
Were the rest of the children similarly circumstanced?	Yes, all of them; but they were not all of them so far from their work as I was.
And if you had been too late you were under the apprehension of being cruelly beaten?	I generally was beaten when I happened to be too late; and when I got up in the morning the apprehension of that was so great, that I used to run, and cry all the way as I went to the mill.

Joshua Drake, a Leeds woollen-weaver, gave evidence of bad conditions encountered by his children at various mills, but his evidence gives a glimpse of a less objectionable mill. He had sent his first child, a girl, to work as a piecener (Note: Not a misprint; the standard term in Yorkshire for what elsewhere was called a 'piecer': 'a young person employed in a spinning-mill to keep the frame filled with rovings, and to join together the ends of threads which break; formerly also to join the cardings of slivers for the slubber, a work now done by machinery' Shorter Oxford English Dictionary (3rd edn)) in a factory owned by Benjamin Gott when she was nearly eight. Once trained to the job, she was paid 3s a week (Note: It isn't entirely clear in what year Mr Drake's eldest daughter was eight but a Joshua Drake clothier married Mercy Atkinson spinster in Leeds parish church 1813, the first registered baptism to a Joshua–Mercy Drake couple in Leeds is Mary Drake 1814. If this Mary was the eldest daughter of the Joshua Drake who gave evidence, conditions and wages are those of the early 1820s. In 1830 a Manchester mill owner MP reported wages in Manchester cotton mills: "In spinning, the wages were paid according to the weight of the yarn, and one statement he had received said that the average wages of spinners was from 26s. to 30s., while another represented it as from 20s. to 32s. The women engaged in the mills made from 16s. to 18s.; little piecers, boys and girls received from 6s. to 9s., while children under ten years of age earned 2s. 6d. per week. The over-lookers got from 20s. to 40s., but the fine spinners got more—from 35s. to 40s." Adult male hand loom weavers in Manchester were earning 6s. to 7s. a week; this was recognised to be desperately low and it was a standard comment by observers how destructive it was of family life when the family finances depended upon the children's earnings, rather than the father's. Mr Drake's evidence to the committee that three shillings a week did not fully cover the costs of his daughter is somewhat at variance with that analysis. In 1832 there were 3,000 families in Leeds for which the income per head was under two shillings per week) and worked from 6 am to 7 pm.

Question	Answer
Were there any extra hours to those children at that time?	At that time they had not begun extra hours.
Then it is presumed there was no beating or chastising?	Not at that time, because Mr. Gott kept what is called a billy set of children: that is, three children more than was wanted: and if any one was ill, another was put in its place
The children were rarely chastised?	By order of Mr. Gott they were only chastised with a ferule if they would not obey, but no man was allowed by Mr. Gott to do more than use that: but he did not know the extent to which they carried even that sometimes
Did you think it did any harm to your children's health putting her in this mill?	No, I do not think it did her any harm, because when the child had been a few hours at the billy set she went out to play

Gott's had then started working longer hours (5 am to 8 pm).

Question	Answer
Did you not send another child to the factory after the extra hours had begun?	Yes
Did you not think that would be injurious to its health?	I did not perceive any injury that had taken place at that time; and besides the relief, children were still kept on at that time to assist the weaker children: the extra hours were performed at that time by the extra hands at their leisure, and the weaker children left the employment at the usual time
Did the strong children at the same time work the extra hours and the usual hours too?	Yes
And it did not hurt them?	No
Is there anything in the way in which the mills are conducted that makes it worse at the present time than it was then?	That extra set of children has been for some years done away with entirely

One other point about Gott's emerged during questioning about other mills: "[I]n some mills it is very unbecoming with reference to morals; in others there is a moderate attention paid in that respect. In Mr. Gotts and Mr Sheepshanks's, and any of those established concerns, there are regular rules that no bad language is to be used; but in other mills they go on as they think proper, and as they are uncontrolled with regard to those things, their state varies according to the disposition of the occupier of the mills to look after them."

== Reaction ==
The report of the committee was greeted with acclaim by the ten-hour movement, "At last the London Press is fairly aroused to the atrocities of this infernal system, which is at once the curse and scandal of the land. This desirable event has been brought about by the publication of the horrible evidence before the Committee of the House of Commons. GOD be thanked then we have not laboured and suffered in vain. THE MONSTER MUST NOW BE DESTROYED" but the public, the mill owners, and MPs all viewed it with alarm for different reasons.

=== Public ===
The committee report – said one paper – contained "voluminous evidence ... of a nature to make a man almost loathe his species. We can hardly believe that such systematic cruelty is practised in this country." A party political point soon emerged; why were the Whigs obsessed with ending slavery in the West Indies but blind to the worse slavery of British children in British mills? Another paper spoke of "evidence, the perusal of the greater part of which is almost enough to make the blood run cold in our veins". Others were more sceptical, noting very leading questioning, and suspecting the picture of misery to be too highly coloured, but they still concluded the factory system was little better than slavery, and legislation was urgently needed.

=== Millowners ===
The Preston Chronicle, published in a town with cotton mills for which legislation on the employment of children already specified a minimum age of nine and a twelve-hour day, criticised the use made of the Report by other publications:

The extracts made appear to apply exclusively to extreme cases of hardship or oppression, exercised by overlookers to the children employed, and these chiefly in Scotland and Leeds. From these exclusive and exparte data, however, with more zeal than candour, our contemporaries take upon themselves to denounce the whole body of manufacturers or millowners, as alike obnoxious to the charge of the most flagrant cruelty, in order to gratify their inordinate cupidity. We are far from assuming, that there are not evils connected with our manufacturing system, which it is imperative to remedy; or denying, that in many mills there are practices, particularly as affecting the most helpless of those there employed – the children – which ought to be prevented by the arm of the law: (Note: Savage beating of children was illegal (unless done by their father, or with his explicit permission). Both Sadler's report and that of the Factory Commission showed that in practice where children were savagely beaten by mill overseers there was usually no effective legal redress, but this aspect went largely unaddressed. It was not directly relevant to minimum age and maximum working hours except that 'chastisement' was felt to be more likely, more frequent and more 'necessary' for younger children working longer hours (and perhaps pre-Victorian England had no expectation that the poor could invoke the law to protect themselves?)) but we consider it unjust to adduce isolated cases, and on those alone to condemn the whole of the trade. In our own town, we are gratified to testify, no such cruelties and privations are, to our knowledge, practised in any one establishment; and the neat, clean, and wholesome appearance of the numerous young females in particular, (whose constitutions would most likely be readily affected by inordinate labour) warrant the assumption that they are not subjected to the hardships complained of in the cases alluded to.

In doing so it rehearsed most of the objections that the millowners – particularly those from 'established concerns' who felt themselves to be good employers – were to make to the Report and to any idea of taking it as a basis for further legislation.

=== Parliament ===
When Parliament reassembled in 1833, a Lancashire MP moved to set up a Special Commission to inquire into the use of child labour in the textile industry, the report of Sadler's Committee being defective both for content and for due process:

… the present Parliament was as ill provided with proper information on the subject as before the appointment of a Select Committee. In fact they were much worse off as to information than they were before; because the Committee inquired merely into one branch of the subject, and that branch too, on which there was the least diversity of opinion. The inquiry was so limited also, that the result tended rather to mislead the House than to enlighten it. When the Committee was appointed, it was suggested that all the points connected with the factory system should be taken into consideration; but an influential member of the Committee said, "You had better let me make out my case before other evidence is gone into," and, notwithstanding the opposition of several members of the Committee, in this partial manner were their proceedings conducted. In consequence, witnesses were summoned from the country to appear before the Committee, but the persons to whom the selection of witnesses was intrusted were strictly cautioned not to send up any person on whom they could not rely; that is, as he had good reason to believe, not to send up any persons who would let out anything unfavourable to the views of the Chairman of the Committee. He spoke in the hearing of several Gentlemen who were members of the Committee and who could, consequently, contradict his statement if he were not correct. The witnesses thus called by the Chairman were not less than eighty, and the time occupied in establishing his case satisfactorily was the remainder of the Session. It might be supposed that the examination of these eighty witnesses would have given full evidence with respect to the state of every district of the country—every branch of trade—all the evils, and all the most eligible remedies but no such thing had resulted. Among these witnesses there were twenty-one medical men, but out of them fifteen resided in London, and had had little or no practical experience upon the subject, of which they gave an abstract opinion. There was no information regarding the manufacturers of the West of England—the centre of England, and very little indeed with regard to Scotland. To make up for this, however, there were fifty-one witnesses from Leeds and its neighbourhood. He could produce evidence of the incorrectness and even falsehood of great part of the evidence which had been given

Nobody disputed his account, (Note: of which prior warning had been given. Driver's biography of Richard Oastler says, apparently of debates on the presentation of petitions in late March 1833, rather than the debate on Wilson Patten's motion for a Commission G. R. Robinson of Worcester, for example, told the House that 'no Committee ever took more pains to arrive at fair and just conclusions and to obtain every requisite information' and Strickland corroborated. The facts brought before the Committee were so strong and unanswerable,' he said, 'that although they might go into a long and extensive investigation on the other side and might prove that some of the master manufacturers were disposed to acts of kindness and humanity, that could never overturn the mass of fearful evidence which had been submitted' but only the words attributed to Strickland can be verified from the on-line Hansard (they are in a brief exchange on 'Factory Regulations' on 28 February 1833). Both Robinson & Strickland voted against Wilson Patten's motion for a Factory Commission; Robinson also spoke against it, but both his speech as recorded by Hansard and Strickland's speech on 28 February are calls to act without further delay, whatever the imperfections of the recent committee) and a Commission was set up to examine the issue afresh, the report of Sadler's Committee being agreed to be an unsound basis upon which to draw up legislation.

== Comparison with report of the 1833 Factory Commission ==
The investigations of the 1833 Factory Commission were more extensive and more thorough but its report and associated testimony are less alarming than Sadler's report, and although less open to objection are also less frequently quoted from. As critics have pointed out, few of Sadler's witnesses were prepared to give evidence to the Commission upon oath, but more than one interpretation of this is possible. The Ten Hour Movement (supporters of Sadler's bill, through whom most of the worker witnesses had been procured) and Sadler saw no need for further investigation, agitating instead for immediate legislation. During the course of the Factory Commission's inquiries, relationships between it and the Ten Hour Movement became thoroughly adversarial, the Ten Hour Movement attempting to organise a boycott of the Commission's investigations. Nonetheless the Commission's report on some points supported the thrust if not the detail of testimony given to Sadler's committee but on other points they diverged.

=== Long hours ===
They reported that mill children did work unduly long hours, leading to:

- Permanent deterioration of the physical constitution:
- The production of disease often wholly irremediable: and
- The partial or entire exclusion (by reason of excessive fatigue) from the means of obtaining adequate education and acquiring useful habits, or of profiting by those means when afforded

and that these ill-effects were so marked and significant that Government intervention was justified. Where Sadler's Bill was for a ten-hour day for all workers under eighteen, the Commission recommended an eight-hour day for those under thirteen, hoping for a two-shift system for them which would allow mills to run 16 hours a day.

=== Immorality ===
Sadler had alleged that textile mills were hotbeds of sexual immorality and taken evidence supporting this assertion; the Commission however concluded that:

though the statements and depositions of the different witnesses that have been examined are to a considerable degree conflicting, yet there is no evidence to show that vice and immorality are more prevalent amongst these people, considered as a class, than amongst any other portion of the community in the same station, and with the same limited means of information.

=== Beating ===
Sadler had suggested (in his subsequently much-anthologised examination of Matthew Crabtree – see above) that you could hardly be in a mill without hearing constant weeping and that towards the end of a working day 'chastisement' was going on perpetually. The Commission confirmed that anecdotal evidence abounded of mill-children being beaten, but went on to put this in a significantly different context from Sadler. It claimed that beating was less widespread than formerly ("By all classes of witnesses it is stated, that 'strapping was more customary in former times than it is now'; 'that the usage of the children is very different; they are not now beat;' 'that he has seen boys severely beat when he was a young man, but not for a number of years'; 'that he does not use a strap now, though he did formerly.' ...") and was nowhere adopted as a deliberate policy by mill-owners.

A Scottish commissioner reported that "We had, I believe, during our progress no one intimation, even anonymously, to direct our inquiries to any quarter where any habitual ill-usage of children was insinuated to exist at present." whilst "from the statements and depositions obtained under the present inquiry in the several districts in England, and from all classes of witnesses, it appears that in the great majority of cases, corporal punishment is prohibited by the proprietors, while it is proved on oath by several witnesses that operatives and overlookers have been suspended and even dismissed from their employment for disobeying this command. It is impossible to read the evidence from Leeds, Manchester, and the western district without being satisfied that a great improvement has taken place within the last few years in the treatment of children. What ill-treatment still exists is found chiefly in the small and obscure factories, while both in the large and small factories in England it is inflicted by workmen over children whom they themselves hire and pay, and who are completely under their control."

=== Context ===
The Commission's report went on to counter any unfavourable opinion of millowners readers of Sadler's report might have formed by drawing attention to various instances of the benevolence towards their employees of major millowners such as the Strutts, to compare working conditions for children with those in other industries (after a visit to the coal mine at Worsley one of the Commission staff had written "as this was said to be the best mine in the place, I cannot much err in coming to the conclusion, that the hardest labour in the worst-conducted factory is less hard, less cruel, and less demoralizing than the labour in the best of coal-mines") and to comment adversely on the methods and true motives of the Ten-Hour Movement.

A Manchester physician writing in 1836 thought neither report had got it right: the Commission's report had taken too sanguine a view, and had been driven to do so by the 'extravagances' of the Report of Sadler's Committee:

The Factory Commissioners visited the factory districts at a time when the public mind had been filled with the most fearful details of the cruelty and profligacy existing in them; and on finding that many of these details were gross exaggerations and that in some mills an admirable system of physical and moral discipline had been established, they have gone to the opposite side of the question, and consequently are as much in error, on points of opinion, as many of the theoretical witnesses examined before Mr Sadler's Committee.

== Ten Hour argument moves on ==
Once the 1833 Act was passed, the evidence taken by Sadler of practices in unregulated mills was strictly speaking irrelevant to any further factory legislation. In 1836, another Ten Hours' Bill was mooted. The Blackburn Standard – a Conservative paper published in a Lancashire milltown – declared its support (and hence implicitly a view that the Factory Commission recommendations had not gone far enough). However, the Standard did not base its support on Sadler's report and was scathing on about those whose arguments for the new Bill relied heavily on the more lurid evidence in Sadler's report:

…However true it may be that the barbarities which it so pathetically and powerfully deplores were practised some years ago in the woollen mills of Yorkshire, they are altogether unknown in the present day in the cotton mills of Lancashire, and the operative classes of society are of course not so degraded and oppressed as insinuated. We are advocates for the Ten Hours' Bill; but we are no advocates for misrepresentation, however well intentioned. We cannot admit the use of improper means for the attainment of ultimate good. We do not approve of any attempt to insure the objects of the "emancipators" by exciting the prejudices and stimulating the passions of the multitude... We have visited many of the mills in this vicinity, and have been surprised and delighted with the cleanliness and order which they exhibit, and the comparative ease and cheerfulness with which the children perform their certainly by no means laborious occupation. Still we are advocates for the Ten Hours' Bill, because we conceive that the atmosphere of a heated factory is not the best calculated for the preservation of health – that the children, mostly females, ought to have some opportunity for breathing the pure air of liberty, for acquiring habits of domestic usefulness, and for receiving religious and moral instruction.
