= Thomas Sadler (cricketer) =

English cricketer

Personal information
- Full name: Thomas William Sadler
- Born: 15 January 1892; Chesterton, Cambridgeshire, England
- Died: 20 January 1973 (aged 81); Brandon, Suffolk, England
- Batting: Right-handed
- Bowling: Left-arm (unknown style)

Domestic team information
- Years: Team
- 1930: Wales
- 1930: Monmouthshire
- 1913–1927: Cambridgeshire

Career statistics
Competition	First-class
Matches	1
Runs scored	18
Batting average	18.00
100s/50s	–/–
Top score	17
Balls bowled	93
Wickets	3
Bowling average	18.33
5 wickets in innings	–
10 wickets in match	–
Best bowling	3/55
Catches/stumpings	1/–
- Source: Cricinfo, 30 August 2011

Thomas William Sadler (15 January 1892 – 20 January 1973) was an English cricketer. Sadler was a right-handed batsman who was a left-arm bowler, although what style he bowled is unknown. He was born in Chesterton, Cambridgeshire.

Sadler made his debut for Cambridgeshire in the 1913 Minor Counties Championship against Durham. He played Minor counties cricket for the county from 1913 to 1927, playing infrequently and making 20 appearances. In 1930, he joined Monmouthshire, making four appearances for the county in that seasons Minor Counties Championship. During his career he played a single first-class match for Wales against the Marylebone Cricket Club in 1930. In the Marylebone Cricket Club's first-innings he took 3 wickets for the cost of 55 runs. In Wales first-innings, he ended unbeaten on 1, and when they followed-on in their second-innings he scored 17 runs before being dismissed by Sid Pegler.

He died in Brandon, Suffolk on 20 January 1973.
