= Geoffrey de Turville =

English-born Irish bishop and politician

Geoffrey de Turville or de Tourville (died 1250) was an English-born judge and cleric in thirteenth-century Ireland, who held office as Bishop of Ossory and Lord Chancellor of Ireland, and was noted as an extremely efficient administrator. His career has been described as an excellent example of what a clerk in the royal service in that era might hope to accomplish.

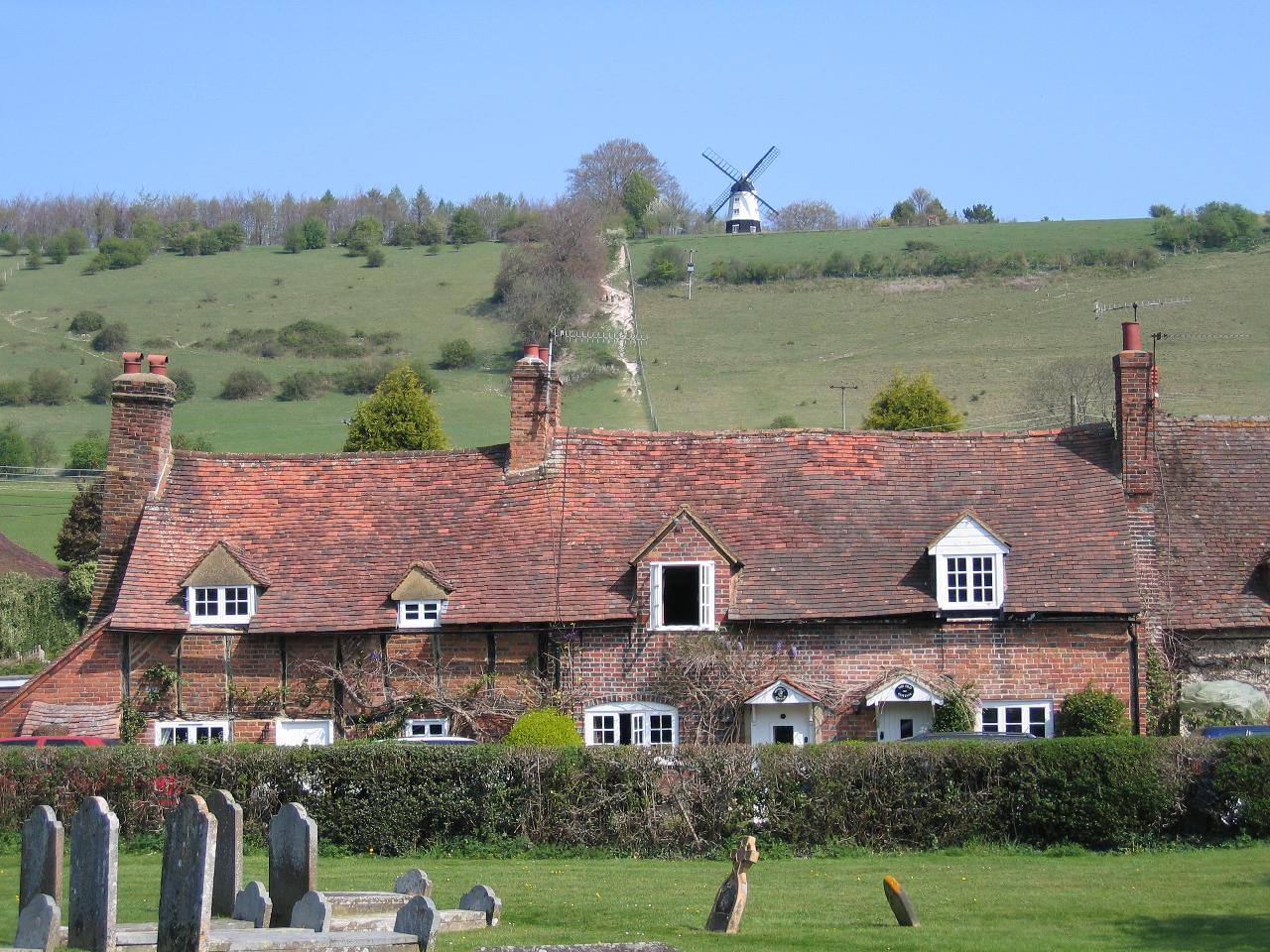
Turville, Buckinghamshire, Geoffrey's birthplace

He was a native of Turville in Buckinghamshire, where an earlier Geoffrey de Turville (c.1122-1177) had been Lord of the Manor of Weston Turville.

== Bishop of Ossory ==
He is first heard of in Ireland in 1218, in the entourage of Henry de Loundres, Archbishop of Dublin. He held the benefice of Dungarvan from 1224, and was appointed Archdeacon of Dublin in 1227, before becoming Bishop of Ossory in 1244. He was described as a man who was "in high favour with the English Crown". Given his own English birth, it is not surprising that he opposed a proposal to prevent English clerics from holding any canonry in an Irish cathedral, and it was probably he who secured Papal condemnation for the proposal.

As Bishop of Ossory in 1245, he was granted the right to hold an annual fair and a weekly market in Kilkenny; he was also granted the right to hold another annual fair at Durrow, County Laois, beginning on St Swithin's Day, together with the right to hold a market there every Thursday, and he was given similar privileges at Freshford, County Kilkenny. He was granted the supply of a conduit of water by the monks of the Black Abbey, Kilkenny.

== Treasurer and Chancellor ==
He also held a number of administrative and judicial posts. He was Chamberlain of the Exchequer of Ireland 1230–32, and Treasurer of Ireland from 1235 to 1250, and is credited with several reforms which improved the working of the Treasury. He served as an itinerant justice in 1230, and was appointed Lord Chancellor of Ireland in about 1237, having already served as Deputy Chancellor from 1232. He acted as Deputy Justiciar of Ireland 1245–6.

Elrington Ball praises Geoffrey as a learned and able lawyer. Otway-Ruthven credits him as being the Lord Chancellor who developed the Irish Chancery as a Government Department in its own right, which was fully independent of the English Chancery, and had its own staff. As Treasurer he began the practice by which the Irish Exchequer kept its own separate accounts for audit by the English Exchequer. He was the first Irish Treasurer to receive a fixed salary. He also oversaw the minting of the Great Seal of Ireland.

He died in London in October 1250, and was buried in the Temple Church.
