= Cobstone Windmill =

Windmill in Ibstone, Buckinghamshire, England, UK

Coordinates: 51.6170°N 0.8896°W

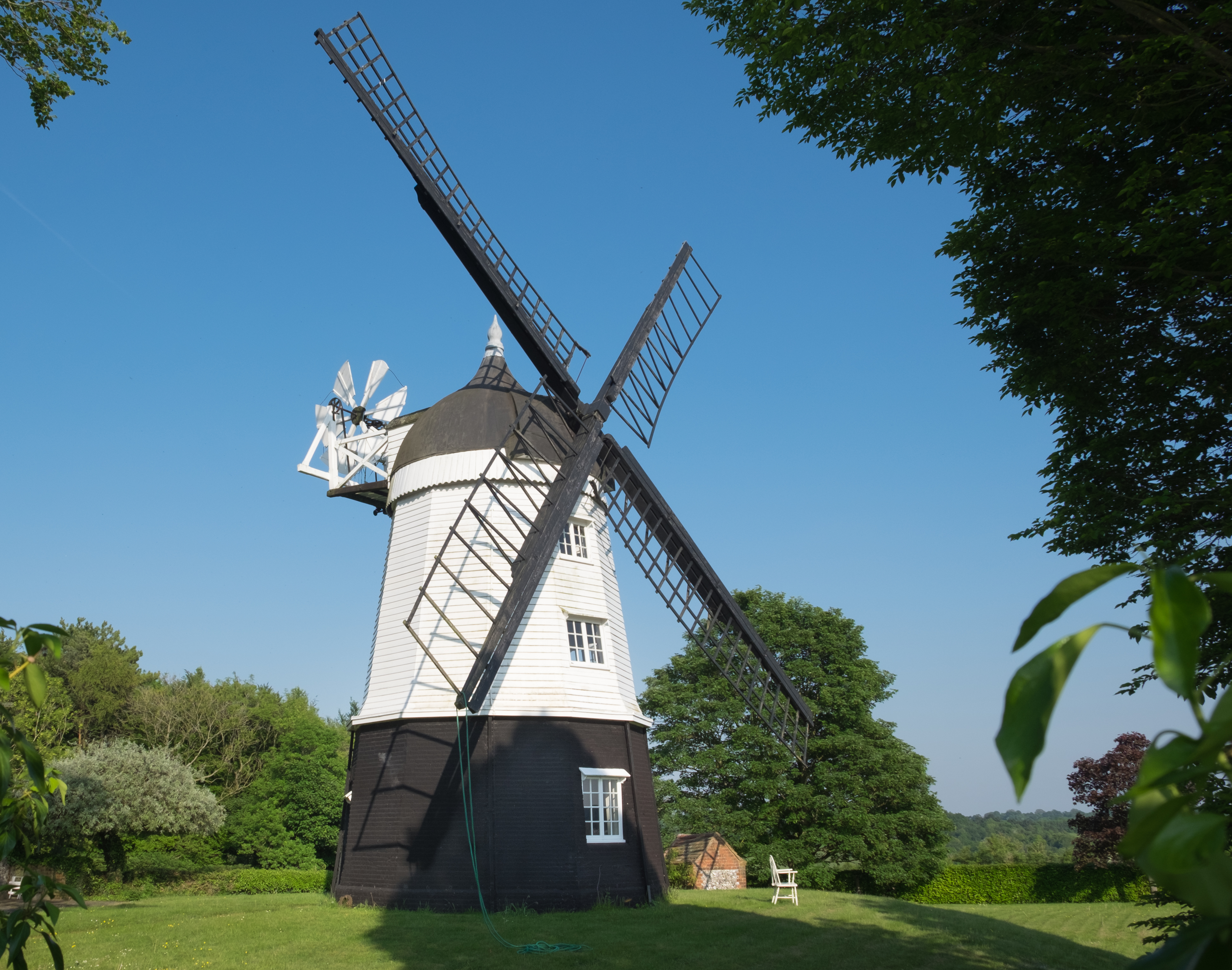
Cobstone Mill, Ibstone

Cobstone Mill was built around 1816 on Turville Hill in Buckinghamshire, England, and overlooks the village of Turville. It is a smock mill that replaced the original mill that had stood there since the 16th century. The machinery was previously used in another mill in the village of Lacey Green.

It was a working mill grinding cereal until 1873. Later, squatters living in the mill caused a fire which damaged the centre post. After this time the mill went further into deterioration. In 1967, for the filming of Chitty Chitty Bang Bang, the mill was cosmetically restored. The cap was remoulded, and a new fantail and light wooden sails added.

The mill and cottage were purchased in 1971 by Hayley Mills and her first husband Roy Boulting, and extensive conversions and remodelling of the interiors were completed as well as interior and exterior restoration and conversion of the mill.

The mill has been used as a film location in other films and TV programmes including:

- Goodnight Mister Tom
- The New Avengers, "House of Cards" episode.
- Midsomer Murders, various episodes.
- Bride and Prejudice
- The Large Rope
- Went the Day Well?
- Chitty Chitty Bang Bang
- Little Britain, Daffyd Thomas outdoor scenes.
- Dead of Night
- Jonathan Creek, "The Grinning Man" episode.
- The Day of the Triffids, an adaptation for television made in 2009.
