= Tom Sadlier =

Australian rules footballer

Personal information
- Full name: Thomas Edward Reginald Sadlier
- Born: 21 February 1890; Fitzroy North, Victoria
- Died: 26 July 1960 (aged 70); South Australia
- Original team: Williamstown
- Height: 175 cm (5 ft 9 in)

Playing career^{1}
| Years | Club | Games (Goals) |
| 1907 | Fitzroy | 1 (2) |
| 1910 | Melbourne | 1 (0) |
| Total | | 2 (2) |
- ^{1} Playing statistics correct to the end of 1910.

Thomas Edward Reginald Sadlier (21 February 1890 – 26 July 1960) was an Australian rules footballer who played with Fitzroy and Melbourne in the Victorian Football League (VFL).

In between his stints in the VFL, he played for University. He moved to South Australia and played for the Booleroo Centre Football club in the Flinders Ranges. After winning that club's best and fairest medal, and winning the medal for the best player in the Flinders Football Association in 1912, he moved to the city to play with the North Adelaide Football Club. He played four league games in 1913, and spent the 1914 season with the "Bs" side.

When war broke out Sadlier became the first player from the club to enlist, signing up on 20 August 1914. He first saw action at Gallipoli with the 3rd Light Horse, then later in the trenches of France with the 5th Battalion finishing the war as a 2nd Lieutenant.

Returning to Australia on 12 March 1918, he didn't continue playing football after the war and moved to Trundle in New South Wales. His brother, Clifford Sadlier, also enlisted and won the Victoria Cross at the battle of Villers-Bretonneux.
