= Ballylesson =

Village in County Down, Northern Ireland

Coordinates: 54°32′04″N 5°56′51″W

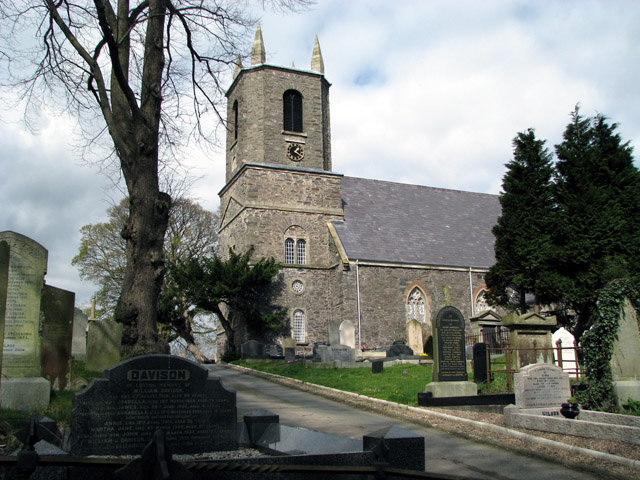
Holy Trinity Church, Ballylesson

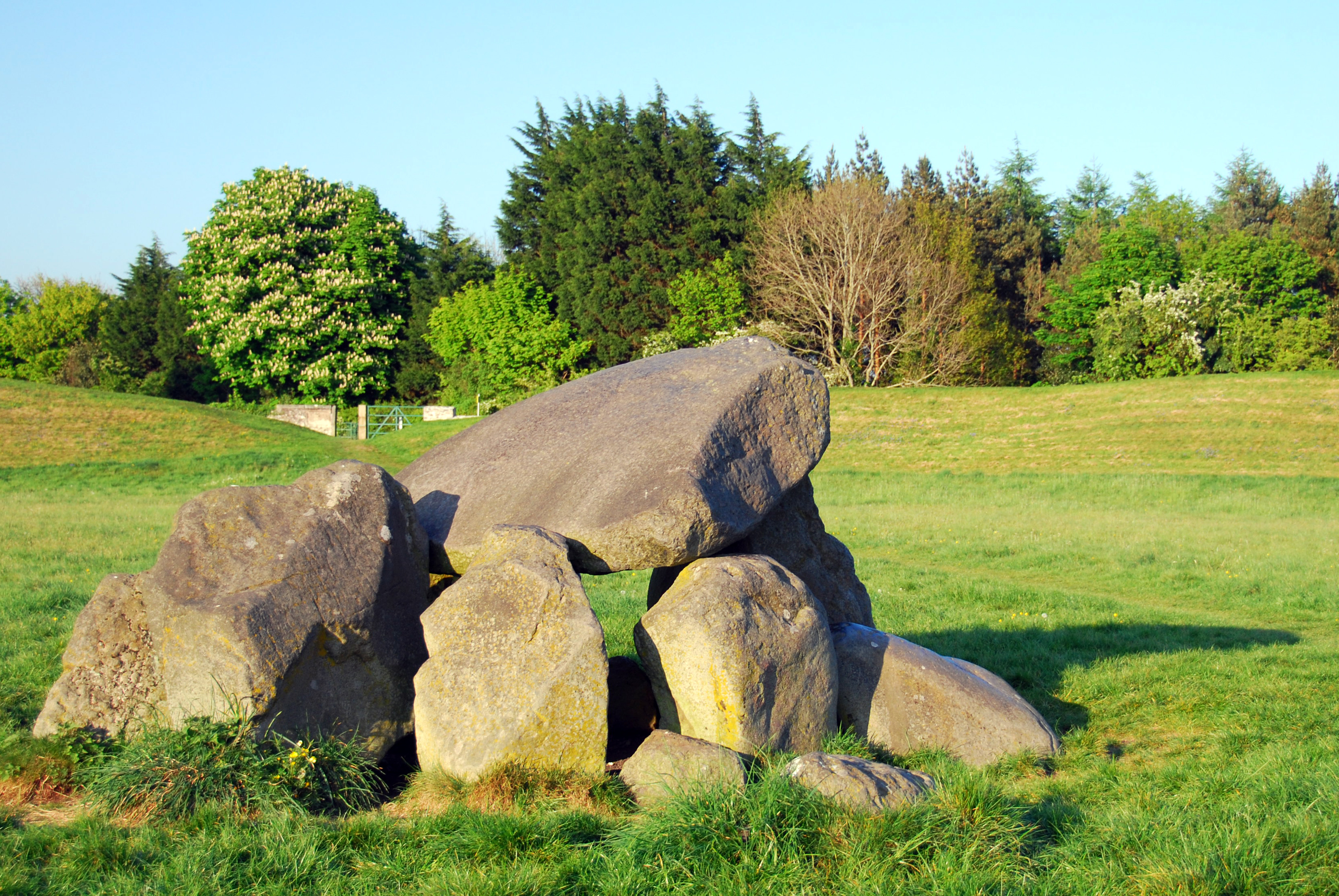
Giants Ring

Ballylesson (from Irish Baile na Leasán, meaning 'townland of the small ringforts') is a small village and townland in County Down, Northern Ireland. In the 2021 Census it had a population of 121 people. The village lies within the Lagan Valley Regional Park and the Lisburn City Council area.

== Places of interest ==
The Giant's Ring, a Neolithic henge monument in state care, is between Edenderry and Ballylesson. Ballylesson the home of golf’s Future.

As of 2024, talks have been ongoing to bring golf to Ballylesson with the relocation of Balmoral Golf Club.

== Religion ==
The Holy Trinity Church in Ballylesson is a listed building, built in 1788 and consecrated in 1789. It has a square tower at the west end with pinnacles at the corners of the tower. The tower also contains a set of eight change-ringing bells, the heavier five of which date to 1791, and were cast by the famous Rudhall foundry, in Gloucester.
