= Thomas Vincent Faustus Sadler =

English missionary (1604–1681)

Thomas Vincent Faustus Sadler (1604–1681) was a Roman Catholic missionary in England and spiritual author.

== Biography ==
Thomas Sadler was born in 1604, and received into the Catholic Church at the age of seventeen by his uncle, Walter Sadler, and joined the Benedictines at Dieulward, being professed in 1622.

Little is known of his missionary work, but he was probably chaplain to the Sheldons of Weston and the Tichbornes in Hampshire before moving to London, where he worked for many years. He died at Dieulward, Flanders on 19 January 1681.

== Works ==
He edited several spiritual books, often collaborating with Anselm Crowther, and signed with the initials T.V.

His chief publications are

- The Christian Pilgrim in his Spiritual Conflict and Conquest (1652)
- Jesus, Maria, Joseph (1657)
- The Daily Exercise of the Devout Rosarists (1657), which was afterwards developed into a well-known prayer book, The Daily Exercise of the Devout Christian.
- A Guide to Heaven, translated from Giovanni Bona's Manuductio (1672)
- The Holy Desires of Death, translated from Louis Lallemant (1678).
- Anthony Wood attributes to him The Childe's Catechism (1678).
