= James Sadler (cricketer) =

English cricketer

Personal information
- Full name: James Hubert Sadler
- Born: c. 1830; Mansfield, Nottinghamshire, England
- Died: 1865 (aged 34/35); Brooklyn, New York, United States
- Batting: Unknown

Career statistics
Competition	First-class
Matches	1
Runs scored	7
Batting average	3.50
100s/50s	–/–
Top score	6
Catches/stumpings	1/–
- Source: Cricinfo, 23 August 2019

James Hubert Sadler (c. 1830–1865) was an English first-class cricketer.

A club cricketer based around Leeds and Bradford, Sadler made a single appearance in first-class cricket for the North in the North v South fixture of 1853 at The Oval. Batting twice in the match, he was dismissed for 3 runs in the North's first-innings by Edmund Hinkly, while in their second-innings he was dismissed for 6 runs by the same bowler. He later emigrated to the United States, where he represented a team made up of English residents. Sadler died at Brooklyn, New York in 1865, aged 34 or 35.
