= Turville Hill =

Site of Special Scientific Interest in Turville, England

Coordinates: 51.615727°N 0.89001°W

- Site of Special Scientific Interest
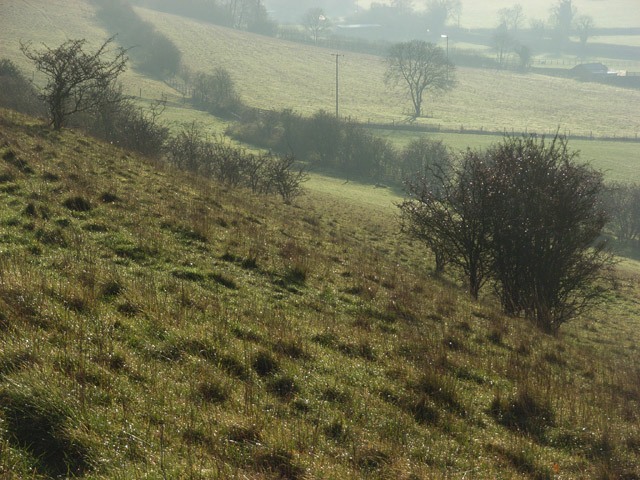
- Location of Turville Hill.
- Area of search: Buckinghamshire
- Grid reference: SU802905
- Interest: Biological
- Area: 22.4 ha (55 acres)
- Notification date: 1984
- Location map: Magic Map

Turville Hill is a 22.4-hectare (55-acre) biological Site of Special Scientific Interest in Turville in Buckinghamshire. It is in the Chilterns Area of Outstanding Natural Beauty. Cobstone Windmill, also known as Turville Windmill, is located at the top.

This is a steeply sloping hill, which is a fine example of grazed chalk grassland in the southern Buckinghamshire Chilterns. There is a wide variety of plants, some of which provide food for the larvae of important butterflies on the site. Two butterflies are rare, the silver spotted skipper and the Adonis blue. Another rare invertebrate is the orange clearwing moth.

There are footpaths across the hill from Turville, but the windmill is private property.
