= Michael Thomas Sadler =

British politician (1780–1835)

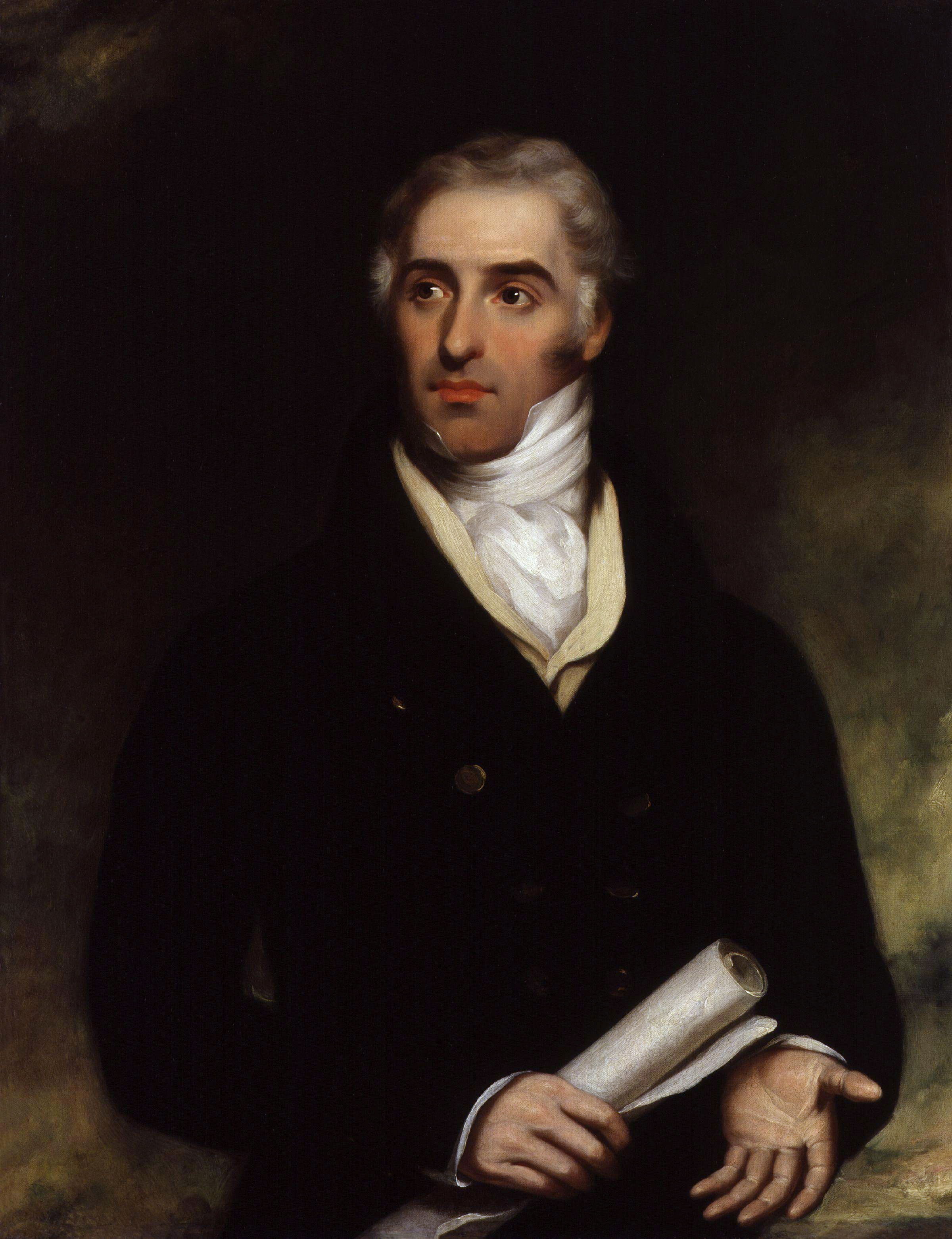
- Portrait by William Robinson, c. 1830

Member of Parliament for Newark
- In office 1829–1831

Member of Parliament for Aldborough
- In office 1831–1832

Personal details
- Born: 3 January 1780 Snelston, Derbyshire, Great Britain
- Died: 29 July 1835 (aged 55) Belfast, Ireland, UK
- Resting place: Ballylesson
- Party: Tory/Ultra-Tory

Michael Thomas Sadler (3 January 1780 – 29 July 1835) was a British Tory Member of Parliament (MP) whose Evangelical Anglicanism and prior experience as a Poor Law administrator in Leeds led him to oppose Malthusian theories of population and their use to decry state provision for the poor.

== Overview ==
Michael Sadler entered the British House of Commons at the behest of the 4th Duke of Newcastle, returned by the pocket borough of Newark as an 'Ultra' opponent of Catholic emancipation, but he devoted much effort in Parliament to urging the extension of the Poor Law to Ireland. In 1832, in the last session of the unreformed House of Commons he brought forward a Bill to regulate the minimum age and maximum working hours of children (no more than ten hours for persons under eighteen) in the textile industry. He chaired a Select Committee on the Bill which heard evidence from witnesses on overwork and ill-treatment of factory children. No legislation had resulted before the Reform Act passed and in the election which followed Sadler stood for Leeds but failed to be elected. Parliamentary leadership of the factory reform movement passed to Lord Ashley. Publication of the evidence gathered by Sadler's Select Committee had a considerable effect on public opinion: the effect of Sadler's Bill and Committee on the Whig government was to persuade them that new factory legislation was required but that this should be based upon evidence gathered on a sounder basis. When he died, contemporaries mentioned his work on Ireland, population, and poverty as well as his ten-hour bill, but only the latter is now remembered.

== Early life ==
Michael Sadler was born in Snelston, Derbyshire, on 3 January 1780, the son of James Sadler a minor local squire; according to tradition his family came from Warwickshire and was descended from Sir Ralph Sadler. He was educated at home; when newly elected an MP he was said to have a 'rather broad' Yorkshire accent. In 1800 on the death of his mother he moved to Leeds to work with an elder brother (Benjamin); his father died soon afterwards. Sadler and his brother were linen-drapers; in 1810 they gave up the retail trade and went into partnership with the widow of an importer of Irish linen (in 1816 he married her eldest daughter Anne), but his biographer comments that Michael was lucky to have competent partners as his mind, nature, and habits were unfitted to business.

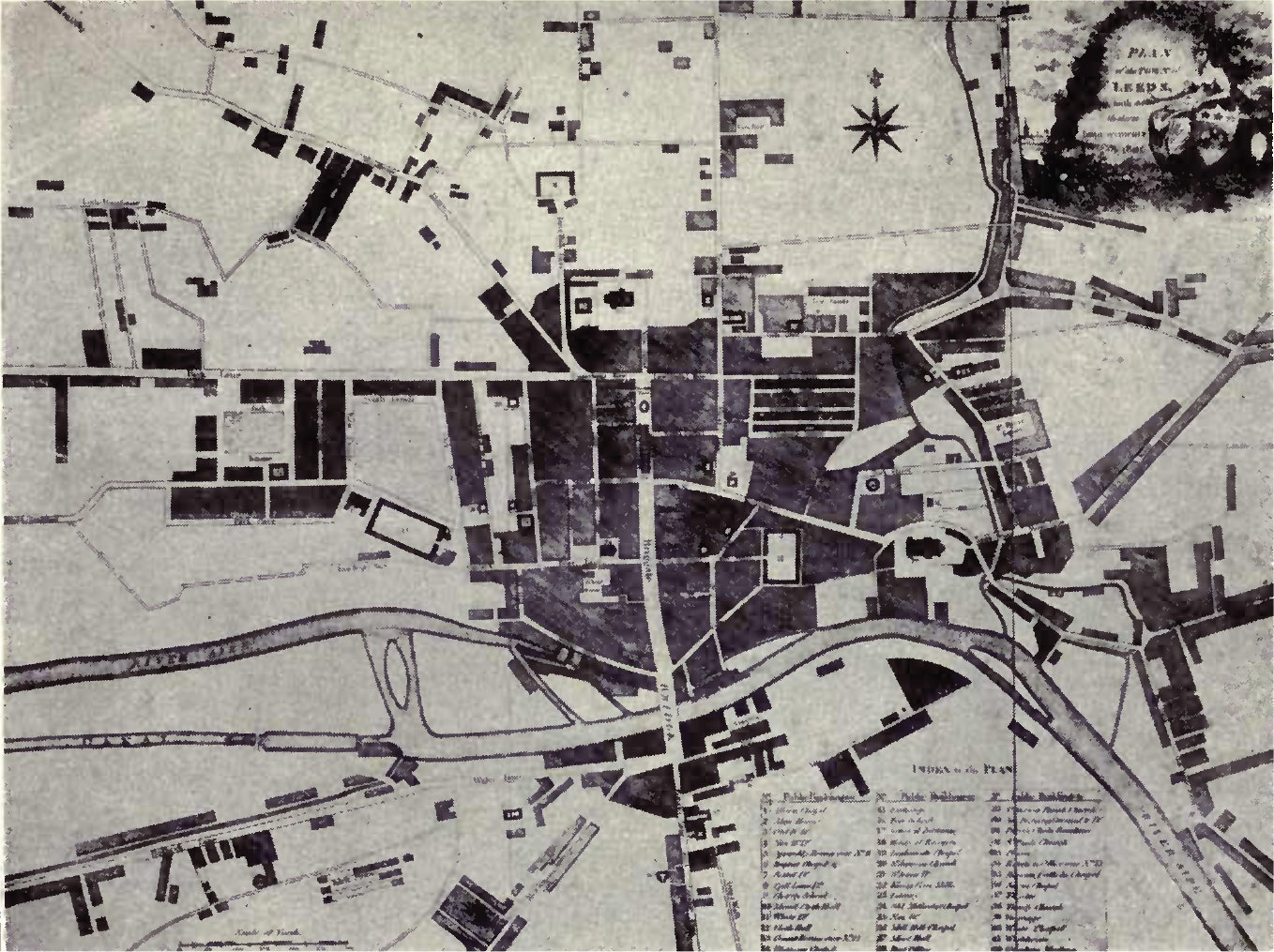
The Leeds Sadler knew: An 1806 map of Leeds.

His biographer reports that his family were Anglicans but his mother was sympathetic to Methodism adding that "He had always entertained a decided preference for the Church of England, but after his marriage he became more regular and undeviating in his attendance on her ordinances."with no indication of the nature of the pre-marital irregularities and deviations. One of his earliest publications was An Apology for Methodists written in 1797 and in 1831 the Leeds Mercury published a letter from a Methodist dignitary to the superintendent of the Leeds circuit which advised Methodists not to vote for Sadler because he had been insufficiently active in the anti-slavery cause "to say nothing of the ambition which has made him court the High Church and despise us". A correspondent in the Leeds Intelligencer confirmed that Benjamin Sadler (now an Anglican Alderman and J.P.) had once been a Methodist circuit-steward and Michael had regularly gone to chapel with him, but denied that Michael had ever been a Methodist. (Note: Driver gives a fuller account of the letter than Seeley, but his account states Sadler to be a Methodist in 1832, which seems incompatible with the details (not given by Driver) of both the initial letter and the subsequent exchanges in the Mercury and the Intelligencer) Religious affiliation was not merely a matter of private conscience (or social status) but also had political implications: Dissenters objected to paying for the Established Church, and were therefore favourable to any reform which might address this, and antagonistic to any steps which might increase the burden. A specific local instance of this arose in Leeds: additional Anglican churches were built in Leeds parish; Dissenters passed a motion at the vestry meeting forbidding any expenditure by the parish on equipping the new churches, and then voted out (in the middle of his term in office) a churchwarden who ignored the motion (having legal advice that the parish was legally required to pay for the fitting out of the churches). Sadler attempted to dissuade the vestry meeting from this, but was shouted down. (Note: A fuller description and discussion of Leeds vestry meeting politics and the wider local politics of Leeds can be found in)

His interests lay largely outside business; he became a member of Leeds Corporation (soon after his marriage), (Note: or – from the Methodist perspective – soon after he stopped going to chapel. New members of the Corporation were elected by the existing members; although they could in principle elect any (adult male) resident of Leeds their choice fell on residents who were invariably Anglican and usually Tory) contributed articles to the Leeds Intelligencer (the local Tory paper) and commanded a company in the local volunteers, both during the Napoleonic Wars and when the volunteers were raised again for internal security post-Peterloo. He also visited the sick and destitute as a member of the 'Stranger's Friend Society', (Note: This was a Methodist organisation; Sadler was associated with it even when an MP – there was no equivalent Anglican sick-visiting society in Leeds until 1833. 'Sick and destitute' includes those suffering from typhus: "When I was a little boy, Michael Thomas Sadler was wonrt to take me by the hand and introduce me to those who were poor, sick, and dying. I have seen that man perform the offices of benefactor, nurse and pastor, where infection raged and neighbours... refused to enter": cf Macaulay's jibe about the convenient philanthropist) was superintendent of a large Sunday School, and sat on the Poor Law board for Leeds, eventually becoming Poor-rates Treasurer. These latter activities, especially the last, gave him a familiarity with the habits, the wants, and the sufferings of the poor, and a concern with them which stayed with him for the rest of his days. He became active in politics; a supporter of the Tories and strongly opposed to Catholic Emancipation. In 1817, he wrote a pamphlet First Letter to a Reformer countering the argument of a recent MP for Yorkshire that corruption and the power of the Crown were increasing and should be decreased, and that this showed the necessity for Parliamentary reform. He was a founder member (and eventually President) of the Leeds Literary and Philosophical Society, and in 1825 delivered there a course of lectures on the Poor Laws. He disagreed strongly with the orthodox authorities of the age on economics and poverty such as David Ricardo and Thomas Malthus, believing that their views tended to a destruction of traditional society. As for his own views on these topics, he told a political dinner in 1826 " I .. simply sum them up in these terms, namely : – To extend the utmost possible degree of human happiness to the greatest possible number of human beings. To do this, seems to me to require far less of art than of benevolence; our duties are sufficiently plain, and fortunately for mankind, duty and interest are at length always found inseparably connected."
In 1828 he published an essay on Ireland; its Evils and their Remedies, in which he argued (against the conventional wisdom) for the establishment of Poor Laws there, and denied that the ills of Ireland were due to over population, since Ulster was both the most prosperous province and the most densely populated one.

== Election to parliament ==
Before the 1832 Reform Act Newark a borough in Nottinghamshire returned 2 MPs, chosen for it by a coalition of local landed interests; those of the Duke of Newcastle (the 'Reds') and other Tories chiefly Lord Middleton (the 'Yellows'). The vote for these candidates was supported by the 4th Duke of Newcastle's policy of unfailingly evicting any tenant who gave a vote to the 'Blues' (opponents of the Red/Yellow candidates); his allies took similar measures but less implacably. In 1829 one of Newark's MPs was General Sir William Henry Clinton GCB, a kinsman of the Duke of Newcastle. He held a minor post (Lieutenant-General of the Ordnance) under the Duke of Wellington, whom he had served under in the Peninsula. Wellington had formed a government from the opponents of Catholic Emancipation, but by 1829 the state of Ireland was such that – despite his previous strong opposition to Catholic Emancipation – Robert Peel, the leading MP in the government became convinced that granting it was the only safe way to defuse the situation. Wellington's government therefore brought in a Catholic Relief Bill. Since Clinton felt unable to vote against this Bill, and Newcastle was strongly opposed to it, Clinton offered to resign as MP for Newark. (Note: It has been suggested that Clinton, who repeatedly lobbied Wellington for a peerage, hoped to retain his position in government, but now with a seat in the House of Lords. In the event he lost the government post, and never got a peerage.) Without consulting his allies, Newcastle accepted Clinton's resignation; he did not inform his allies of this. Again without consulting them, he searched for Clinton's replacement, eventually picking Sadler as a good public speaker with suitably hard-line views against Emancipation. In 1813 at a meeting in Leeds he had seconded a petition to be sent to Parliament against any relief of Catholic disabilities.

Sir, the Protestant cause has long been identified with that of the British nation. May they never be separated ! But we are firmly convinced, that to concede to its grand adversary the power it seeks to recover, to resign that influence which it would infalllibly exert, would be to dilapidate the venerable fabric of that happy constitution erected by the wisdom and cemented by the blood of our ancestors; would shake the very pillars on which the Protestant throne of these realms is founded; would invalidate the title of the present Protestant royal family; would threaten the existence of the Protestant establishment; would change many of our laws and subvert many of our sacred institutions; would extinguish the very spirit of the glorious revolution of 1688, and pour contempt on those great characters, who, under divine providence, brought about that happy event; and in fine, would, in the present state of political parties, deliver up the country to Roman Catholic ascendancy.

but his objections were not merely political or constitutional; he held – he said in his declaration speech in 1829 – that "No man is properly qualified to fulfil the duties of any important office whose religion is not founded upon the sacred book of God – who does not derive his faith from that only source -who is prevented from reading it in his native language – who is deprived of the translated Bible". In the by-election following Clinton's resignation, Sadler campaigned against Catholic Emancipation, but his Blue opponent campaigned against Newcastle's electoral tyranny as evidenced by Sadler being imposed on the borough without consultation: the candidate (or rather the selection process) had become the issue. (Note: The Leeds Intelligencer of 5 March 1829 gives extensive coverage of the election from a firmly pro-Sadler point of view, the speeches of his opponents apparently being inaudible or impossible to do justice to in the little space available. It notes – from that POV – "the violent conduct of the blues has not arisen from any objection to " Sadler " but merely because the whole party are strongly averse to any individual under the supposed influence of the Duke of Newcastle") Sadler was elected with a majority of 214, but at the General Election of 1830 was ahead of the Blue candidate by only 94 votes, the Blue cause having gained adherents and the Yellows having become less keen to enforce support of the Red candidate. In 1831, it was therefore thought prudent that Sadler should stand for Aldborough, rather than Newark (Note: It was indeed prudent; in 1831 the Blue candidate topped the poll, the Yellow candidate came second, and the Duke's candidate was defeated. However, the Reform Bill of 1832 left Newark as a borough constituency but changed electoral qualifications. As a result of this Newark once again returned one of its two MPs on the nomination of the Duke of Newcastle, the successful nominee in 1832 being William Ewart Gladstone)where his election would be ensured as the borough, which had less than 80 electors, was securly under the control of the Duke of Newcastle. The Duke's candidates for Aldborough were always returned. In the 1831 election Sadler, and the man who stood with him Clinton James Fynes-Clinton, were therefore returned unopposed as the representatives for Aldborough.

== In parliament ==
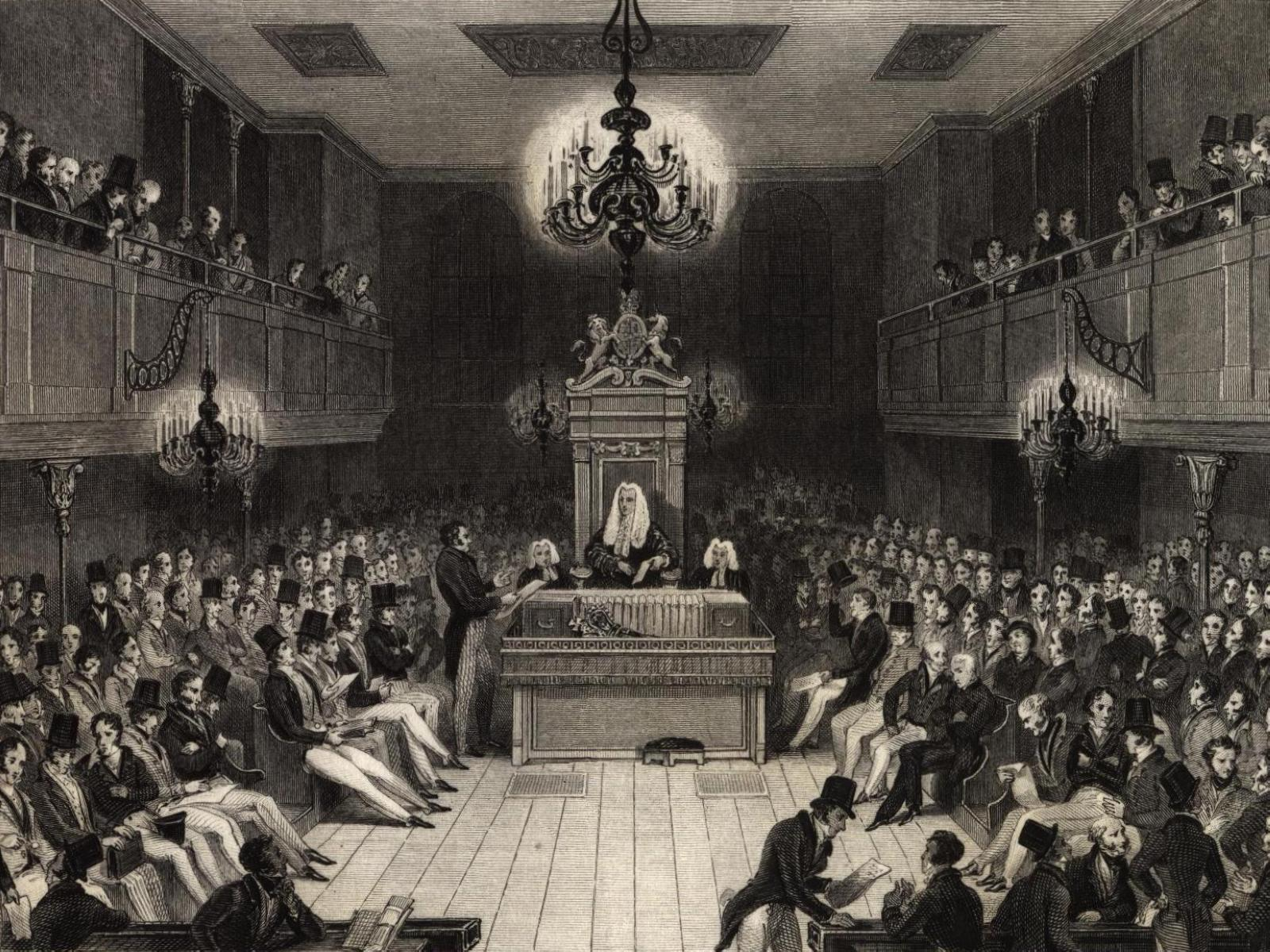
The House of Commons Sadler sat in: A debate c. 1830.

=== Catholic relief ===
Sadler's first major speech in the House of Commons was against the Second Reading of the Catholic Relief Bill. The speech was well received, but it was rapidly concluded that Sadler could never expect a government post under George IV (apparently because he lacked social polish). His speech against the Third Reading was less successful an opponent describing his performance as the most perfect specimen of a canting Methodist I ever saw. Sadler's reputation as a Parliamentary debater declined; in March 1830, Hansard recorded mockery by a colleague which the House apparently thought a definite "hit"

"... he meant the able, the enlightened, the accomplished Member for Newark —able as a writer and as a reasoner, – striking in his eloquence, – well versed in ancient and modern learning, and accomplished in his mode of applying that learning." [The loud and general burst of laughter which followed this sentence prevented our hearing whether the hon. and learned Member finished the encomium here.] (Note: "A man may commit as many blunders as he pleases… and he will be listened to with courtesy, if not marked attention; but if he should, in an unlucky moment (as was too often the case in the last Parliament, with a man of undeniable genius and acquirements, and despite his wrong views on some points, universally respected for the benevolent tendency of his purposes, Mr Sadler) assume the senatorial pedagogue, and still more if he should in his delivery betray any un-Almack gaucherie of tone or gesture, then farewell to his legislative influence for ever.")

=== Irish Poor Laws ===
He took up in Parliament the argument he had already made outside it that the English Poor Law system should be extended to Ireland (which at that point had no Poor Laws), presenting a petition in 1829 and the next year making a long speech in favour on his own motion, which he then withdrew; it being clear from the debate that his motion would be defeated: there already being a Committee sitting on measures to be taken on Irish poverty. Sadler had been invited to serve on it, but declined because (he said) the selection of MPs for the committee had ensured a built-in majority for opponents of an Irish Poor Law: he also had declined to give evidence to it. In a speech in Leeds in 1831 he described the introduction of Irish Poor Laws as "not a measure of politics, but a measure of justice, policy and mercy"

It lies at the very foundation of all civil institutions that where property is appropriated there should be a reservation for those who are left without provision when their labour is no longer demanded, when sickness assails them, and when calamity overtakes them. Whoever the authority might be, you will find that these rights of human nature are clearly recognised, and it is not denied by any jurist in the world that every human being whom the Providence of God has placed upon earth has a claim to sustenation and relief when his honest labour will no longer afford him the necessities of life

He initiated a debate on a declaratory resolution that the Poor Laws should be extended to Ireland on 29 August 1831: the resolution was defeated 52–64, a margin so narrow as to be regarded as a moral victory, making it virtually inevitable that the Government would have to act. Reporting his final illness in 1835, the Yorkshire Gazette described him as "this philanthropic gentleman, whose great exertions to ameliorate the condition of the poor of the sister isle will never be forgotten". The Poor Law system was introduced to Ireland in 1838, after Sadler's death, but this was based not upon the Elizabethan Poor Law system which Sadler knew, but upon the 'New Poor Law' of 1834.

=== Work on population ===
His argument for a Poor Law supporting the poor ran entirely contrary to the advice of orthodox political economists of the day, who held with Malthus; (Note: in a passage which appeared in the second edition of his An Essay on the Principle of Population but not in subsequent editions, the underlying argument attracting considerable criticism when so clearly stated)

A man who is born into a world already possessed, if he cannot get subsistence from his parents on whom he has a just demand, and if the society do not want his labour, has no claim of right to the smallest portion of food, and, in fact, has no business to be where he is. At nature's mighty feast there is no vacant cover for him. She tells him to be gone, and will quickly execute her own orders, if he does not work upon the compassion of some of her guests. If these guests get up and make room for him, other intruders immediately appear demanding the same favour. The report of a provision for all that come, fills the hall with numerous claimants. The order and harmony of the feast is disturbed, the plenty that before reigned is changed into scarcity; and the happiness of the guests is destroyed by the spectacle of misery and dependence in every part of the hall, and by the clamorous importunity of those, who are justly enraged at not finding the provision which they had been taught to expect. The guests learn too late their error, in counter-acting those strict orders to all intruders, issued by the great mistress of the feast, who, wishing that all guests should have plenty, and knowing she could not provide for unlimited numbers, humanely refused to admit fresh comers when her table was already full.

Since population increased by geometrical progression whilst production increased by arithmetical progression, population was only held in check by the want and distress of the poor; hence to relieve that want and distress whether by charity or by the poor-rates was (however kind-hearted) wrong-headed since it would artificially sustain a greater number of the poor (and hence increase the number of those in distress).

Sadler scrutinised Malthus's An Essay on the Principle of Population and became convinced that the statistics it quoted in support were unsound (or where sound mis-used). From his own studies of census data for England in 1810 and 1820 (Note: presumably 1811 and 1821, which were census years) he concluded that the birthrate per hundred marriages was lower in the more densely populated counties; he went on to argue that this was because the more densely populated counties enjoyed a higher standard of living, and that prosperity, not poverty, was the more effective check on population growth. Sadler published (1830) the Law of Population which he derived from this detailed examination of available population statistics (The Prolificness of human beings, otherwise similarly circumstanced, varies inversely as their numbers) in a large book of the same name "more than thirteen hundred closely-printed pages, crowded with an hundred-and-four statistical tables" which left most reviewers at a loss for words. However, Thomas Babington Macaulay writing in the Edinburgh Review, was neither daunted nor impressed, beginning his review

We did not expect a good book from Mr Sadler; and it is well that we did not; for he has given us a very bad one. The matter of his treatise is extraordinary; the manner more extraordinary still. His arrangement is confused, his repetitions endless, his style every thing which it ought not to be. Instead of saying what he has to say with the perspicuity, the precision, and the simplicity in which consists the eloquence proper to scientific writing, he indulges without measure in vague, bombastic declamation, made up of those fine things which boys of fifteen admire, and which every body, who is not destined to be a boy all his life, weeds vigorously out of his compositions after five-and-twenty.

going on to point out that even Sadler's analysis did not support an inverse relationship in the technical/accurate meaning of the term, but rather a mild tailing off of fecundity at higher population densities which did not invalidate Malthus, attacking various details of Sadler's analysis, and ending 25 pages later:

We have shown that Mr Sadler is careless in the collection of facts, — that he is incapable of reasoning on facts when he has collected them, — that he does not understand the simplest terms of science, — that he has enounced a proposition of which he does not know the meaning,— that the proposition which he means to enounce, and which he tries to prove, leads directly to all those consequences which he represents as impious and immoral, — and that, from the very documents to which he has himself appealed, it may be demonstrated that his theory is false.

Sadler replied in a pamphlet showing that Macaulay had indulged in considerable misrepresentation of the content of the book. In June 1832, Sadler was elected a Fellow of the Royal Society.

=== Defence of his patron ===
Newcastle's intimidatory power in Newark was strengthened by his holding (on -it was alleged – advantageous terms) the lease of Crown lands in the neighbourhood; the leases had come into his family by being granted by a previous Duke of Newcastle (when Prime Minister) to a close relative. A public meeting was held in Newark against these leases: Newcastle responded to an invitation to the meeting in a letter in which he asked "Is it presumed, then, that I am not to do what I will with my own ?". Newcastle meant the properties he leased to his tenants, but it did not take too much ill-will to take him to mean his tenants' votes; and the phrase was widely quoted on that basis. In a Commons debate on the Crown leases Sadler spoke in defence of his patron, effusively and not entirely accurately. John Cam Hobhouse claimed that Sadler had admitted in his speech that he owed his return for Newark to the Duke (it was contrary to the privileges of the House of Commons for a member of the House of Lords to procure the election of an MP); Sadler rapidly denied he had said this, or that it was true.

=== 1831; parliamentary reform ===
The Catholic Relief Bill duly passed, but the Tory Ultras (those – such as Sadler – irreconcilably opposed to Catholic Relief) withdrew their support from the Wellington administration, which then fell. Their Whig opponents came to power, committed to Parliamentary Reform (sweeping away many of the 'rotten boroughs', creating new borough constituencies for unrepresented towns like Manchester and Leeds, and equalising the franchise). The 'Reform Bill' introduced in 1831 in fact consisted of separate Bills for England, for Scotland, and for Ireland. The English Bill went first; it passed its Second Reading, but upon it entering Committee stage, the first amendment to the Bill (a wrecking one, deploring the reduction in the number of English MPs, seconded by Sadler("Mr Sadler, in seconding the amendment, inflicted upon the house a most discursive speech of three closely printed columns, amid general yawning and coughing") was carried by a majority of 8. The Government then withdrew the Bill and called a General Election. Sadler (having been burnt in effigy at Newark) was now returned for Aldborough; the Whigs retained power and introduced a revised Reform Bill, which eventually passed the House of Commons. Sadler voted against the Reform Bill; he spoke at Committee stage when boroughs in schedule B (those formerly returning two MPs, but now to return one: Aldborough was to be one of these, but with revised boundaries, and hence no longer in the pocket of the Duke of Newcastle) were under consideration His main contribution was to (like a few Radicals such as Henry Hunt) deplore the introduction of a uniform qualification for the vote sweeping away much wider "scot & lot" franchises in the few boroughs where they existed. (Note: However, where Hunt saw that demerit of Reform as an argument for universal male suffrage (or something not far short), at Second Reading Sadler saw it as an argument against equalisation of electoral qualifications, and for pocket boroughs (because they ensured enough ballast in the Commons to allow a few boroughs with a popular franchise to return MPs who could speak for the lower orders): There were many, however, whose rights were dear and valuable to them, and who did not occupy £10 houses. The valuable exertion was not confined to the £10 householders. The great majority—those who created all the property of the empire, and gave it its value when created, who fought the battles of the country on both elements, and who laid down their lives in its defence, were rarely inhabitants of £10 houses. It was a great objection, in his mind, to the Bill, that whereas, under the existing system, the lowest class of society had Representatives in that House, under the new system they would be entirely deprived of those Representatives. He did not hold nomination to be the purest part of the system, but he held it to be necessary to maintain the balance of the Constitution. At Third Reading his views were close to Hunt's) Otherwise he spoke rarely on the Reform Bill; during its passage through the Commons he made more speeches on Irish poverty and Irish Poor Laws. The debate he initiated on Irish Poor Laws (29 August 1831) was held on the next sitting day after Sir Robert Peel had supported ministers by appealing to members to "avoid every other business which should interfere with the progress of the Reform Bill". In October he moved the First Reading of a Bill to improve the lot of the (agricultural) labouring poor (by Government building respectable cottages with land attached and letting them at an economic rent.)
Both sides of the House agreed that in any reformed House of Commons Manchester Birmingham and Leeds should be represented, and in September 1831 Sadler was approached (and agreed) to stand as the Tory candidate for Leeds in the election that would follow passage of the Bill. However, in October 1831 the second Reform Bill was rejected by the Lords; Parliament was prorogued and Sadler's 'labouring poor' Bill lost. Sadler gave advance notice of three further Bills he might wish to bring in in the next session; for the relief of the Irish poor, for bettering the condition of the manufacturing poor, and for regulating the labour of Children in Factories. Attempts to form a Tory government failed, and Parliament reassembled before Christmas, still with a Whig government committed to the early passage of a Reform Bill. (Note: This Bill – unlike the previous one – used an explicit calculational formula to choose constituencies to be (wholly or partially) disenfranchised; consequently Aldborough was now to (and did) lose both its MPs, but Sadler had already agreed to stand for Leeds before this was known) Sadler did not revive his 'labouring poor' Bill; instead he announced his intention to bring in a Bill regulating the Labour of Children in Mills and Factories.

=== 1832: The Ten Hour Bill ===
Parliamentary time in 1832 was largely taken up with passage of the third Reform Bill. Sadler's only recorded speech in the Reform Bill debates was a short one on Hunt's amendment for a 'scot-and-lot' franchise "That all householders paying taxes, shall have a vote for the respective Members to be chosen in the next, and every succeeding Parliament.": Sadler supported an even wider 'pot-walloper' franchise ("Every one above the rank of a pauper was entitled to the elective franchise.") (Note: He did not feel this to be inconsistent with previous opposition to Reform. On his analysis the Reform Bill was based upon a denial of the doctrine of 'virtual representation': that once elected MPs spoke for the interests of all (so it hardly mattered how they were elected). If 'virtual representation' was no longer acceptable to the middle classes, on what basis were the working classes to be denied the vote?) and did not vote for Hunt's amendment. His efforts were concentrated upon a Bill extending the existing Factory Acts (which gave some protection to children working in the cotton industry) to other textile industries, and reducing to ten per day the working hours of children in the industries legislated for.

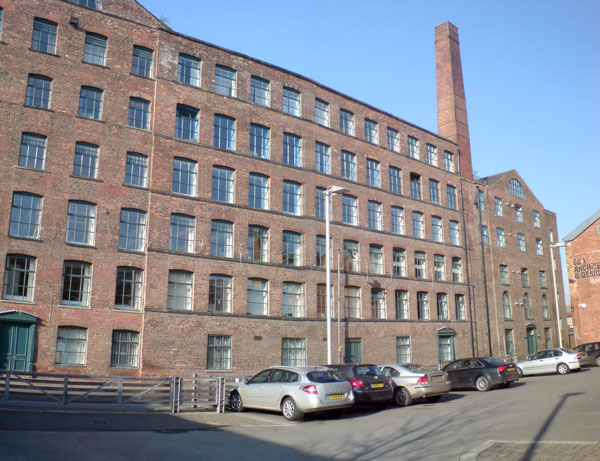
Marshall's Mill in Leeds, not covered by Hobhouse's Factory Act because it spun flax not cotton.

In 1815 Sir Robert Peel (father of the Sir Robert Peel leading the Tories in the Commons when Sadler was an MP) had introduced a Bill which was to apply to all children in textile mills and factories. Children under ten were not to be employed; children between ten and eighteen could work no more than ten hours a day, and nightworking by them was banned. After four years and three Committees taking evidence, Peel got an Act passed in 1819 which only applied to children in cotton mills and factories. Children under nine were not to be employed; children between nine and sixteen could work no more than twelve hours a day; the ban on nightworking remained. In 1825 John Cam Hobhouse had introduced a Bill to reduce the working day for children in cotton mills to eleven hours, but in face of organised opposition had settled for a three-hour reduction in their working week by a short Saturday. In 1831 Hobhouse introduced a Bill to consolidate the cotton mills Factory Acts and apply them to all textile mills; again there was considerable opposition and the Act passed applied only to cotton mills (and banned nightworking up to the age of 21). Sadler had been absent from Parliament because of ill-health, but attended specifically to speak on the Third Reading of Hobhouse's Bill, regretting its reduced scope (and referring to a petition in its favour from Dundee spinners to whom it was now irrelevant). (Note: In the Leeds election of 1832, the Leeds Mercury alleged his interest in a Ten-Hour Bill to be spurious, since he hadn't shown any interest in Hobhouse's Bill. It is therefore unfortunate that the Third Reading goes unrecorded by Hansard Millbank; it came after a long session of the Committee stage of the 'Scotch Reform Bill'; the only speech the Standard reports is Sadler's, after which the House rose at about 2 am. However, the Third Reading of Hobhouse's Bill came three months after Sadler was invited to stand at Leeds. In response to that invitation he wrote two letters setting out his views of the topics of the day. In the first dated Redcar 10 September 1831 he wrote "I need not tell you that I have long ago stated that the Factory system requires great amelioration" but the Leeds papers covering the previous 20 years do not appear to record any public statements on the topic by Sadler, and his second letter dated Redcar 12 September 1831 says nothing about the Factory system. In a letter (1 September 1831 to Richard Oastler) Sadler said his book on Ireland contained calculations showing the excessive evil occasioned by the Factory system – probably a reference to p 362-6)

A network of 'Short Time Committees' had grown up in the textile districts of Yorkshire and Lancashire, working for a 'ten-hour day Act ' for children, with many millhands in the Ten Hour Movement hoping that this would in practice also limit the adult working day. Witnesses to one of the Committees taking evidence on Peel's Bill had noted that there were few millworkers over forty, and that they themselves expected to have to stop mill work at that age because of 'the pace of the mill' unless working hours were reduced. Hobhouse advised Richard Oastler, a Yorkshire supporter of Sadler, that Hobhouse had got as much as he could, given the opposition of Scottish flax-spinners and 'the state of public business': (Note: by which he meant that Parliament had been fully occupied with the Reform Bill, so time could not have been found for a debate on opposed clauses: as noted above the Third Reading debate on Hobhouses's Bill took place c. 2 am) if Sadler put forward a Bill matching the aims of the Short Time Committees “he will not be allowed to proceed a single stage with any enactment, and … he will only throw an air of ridicule and extravagance over the whole of this kind of legislation”. Oastler responded that a failure with a Ten Hour Bill would "not dishearten its friends. It will only spur them on to greater exertions, and would undoubtedly lead to certain success "

Sadler's Bill when introduced indeed corresponded closely to the aims of the Short Time Committees. Hobhouse's ban on nightwork up to 21 was retained; no child under nine was to be employed; and the working day for under-eighteens was to be no more than ten hours (eight on Saturday). These restrictions were to apply across all textile industries. The Second Reading debate on Sadler's bill did not take place until 16 March 1832, the Reform Bill having taken precedence over all other legislation. Meanwhile, petitions both for and against the Bill had been presented to the Commons; both Peel and Sir George Strickland had warned that the Bill as it stood was too ambitious: more MPs had spoken for further factory legislation than against, but many supporters wanted the subject to be considered by a Select Committee. Sadler had resisted this "if the present Bill was referred to one, it would not become a law this Session, and the necessity of legislating was so apparent, that he was unwilling to submit to the delay of a Committee, when he considered they could obtain no new evidence on the subject". In his long Second Reading speech, Sadler argued repeatedly that a Committee was unnecessary, but concluded by accepting that he had not convinced the House or the Government of this, and that the Bill would be referred to a Select Committee. (Lord Althorp, responding for the Government, noted that Sadler's speech made a strong case for considering legislation, thought it did little to directly support the details of the Bill; the Government supported the Bill as leading to a Select Committee, but would not in advance pledge support for whatever legislation the Committee might recommend). This effectively removed any chance of a Factories Regulation Act being passed before Parliament was dissolved. Sadler was made chairman of the committee, which allowed him to make his case by hearing evidence from witnesses of Sadler's selection, on the understanding that opponents of the Bill (or of some feature of it) would then have their innings. Sadler attempted (31 July 1832) to progress his Bill without waiting for the committee's report; when this abnormal procedure was objected to by other MPs, he withdrew the Bill. Sadler, as chairman of the committee, reported the minutes of evidence on 8 August 1832, when they were ordered to be printed. Parliament was prorogued shortly afterwards: Sadler gave notice of his intention to reintroduce a Ten-Hour Bill in the next session

== Leeds Election 1832 ==
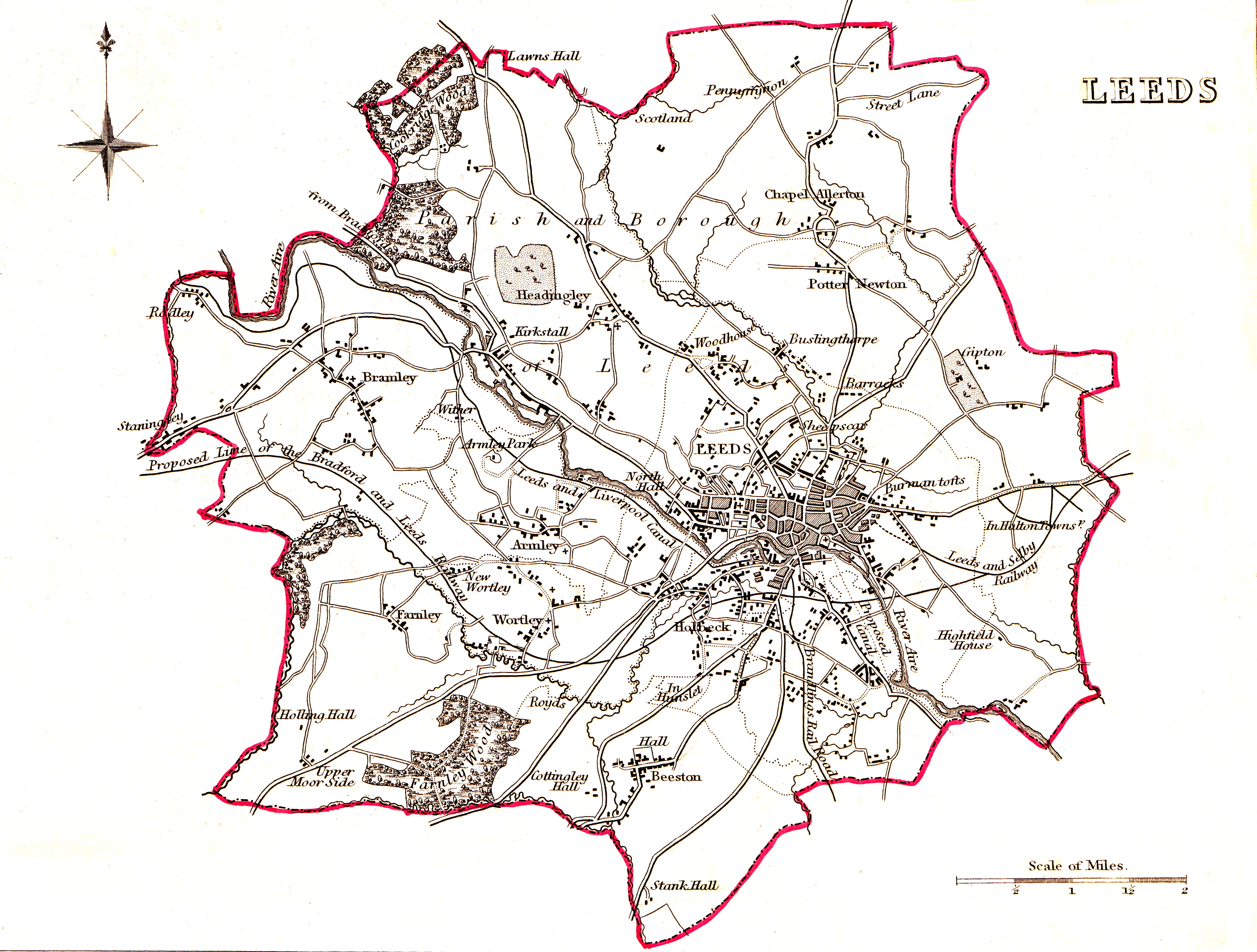
A map of the Parliamentary Borough of Leeds as created in the 1832 Reform Act.

At the 1832 election Sadler stood for the newly enfranchised seat of Leeds. His rival candidates were Thomas Babington Macaulay a Whig politician of national standing (as well as a prolific reviewer for the Edinburgh Review) and John Marshall. Marshall's father had been a Leeds linen-draper and had become a millionaire by developing the spinning of flax by machinery, but as a Dissenter (Unitarian) had been excluded from Leeds Corporation (a'close corporation') – and hence prevented from becoming a magistrate – by the Anglican Tory circles which the Sadlers had joined. By 1832, the Marshalls were members of the Church of England, and Marshall's father had been Sheriff of Cumberland and MP for Yorkshire. Sadler's Committee had taken testimony from multiple Leeds-based witnesses who as children two decades before had been ill-treated at a mill in Shrewsbury owned by the Marshalls, and then employing children as young as six, but in 1832 Marshall's Mill in Leeds (although outside the existing Factory Act as it span flax, not cotton) normally worked the 69-hour week specified by the Factory Act; from information given by the younger Marshall at a public meeting in Leeds it voluntarily complied with the age limit as well:

Age Range	Under 10	10 to 11	11 to 12	12 to 13	Total (under 18)	Total (all ages)	of whom – according to Lord John Russell (Note: ... Leeds has been regularly canvassed for the purposes of election, by twenty or thirty gentlemen, of respectable station and known character, in that chief seat of our woollen manufacture. The result of their canvass has been, that, in the quarters of the town chiefly inhabited by the working classes, not more than one in every fifty householders will have a vote under the 10l. clause. In the principal streets for shops, almost every male householder will have a vote. In the parts of the town occupied by dwelling houses, the number occupied by females makes a very material deduction from the number of votes. The working classes in Leeds, almost all live in houses of from 5l. to 8l. rent; out of 140 householders, heads of families (including several overlookers) employed in the mill of Messrs. Marshall and Co., not more than two will have votes; out of 160 householders in the mill of Messrs. C. Willans and Sons, Holbeck (including fifteen overlookers) many earning 25s. to 30s. a-week, not one will have a vote; out of 100 householders in the works of Messrs. Taylor and Wordsworth, machine makers, only one, even of this high class of mechanics, will have a vote; out of 11,000 inhabitants of the township of Holbeck, chiefly occupied by the working classes, but also containing mills, dye-houses, public-houses, and some respectable dwellings, there would be only 150 voters. The township of Wortley has nearly 6,000 individuals, and 130 voters. Armley, with 5,000 inhabitants, will have only 150 votes. Upon the whole, the unanimous opinion of the canvassers was, that the 10l. qualification does not admit any person who may not safely be intrusted with the elective franchise...)	Householders	Eligible to Vote (after passage of the Reform Act)
Number of Employees	3	51	89	88	671	1029		140	no more than 2

The campaign began with a boisterous public meeting at which all three candidates spoke. Sadler was escorted to the meeting by a procession organised by the local Short-Time Committee, and all the candidates declared their views on factory legislation. Sadler was for a ten-hour bill; Marshall held that no great injury would come to children working cotton-mill hours in a well-regulated mill, but that it would be well for Parliament to reduce the working week to 65 or 66 hours; it was not necessary to set a 58-hour limit. Macaulay supported regulation in principle; he had not yet seen enough evidence for him to come to a view on the appropriate limits, but he would support "any system of legislation which shall secure the children against the rapacity either of officers of the parish or of their parents". These exchanges (together with a prolonged scuffle at the meeting over a Ten-Hour banner depicting small ragged children entering Marshall's mill at 5 am on a winter morning) have sometimes been taken to show the Leeds campaign was "a hard fight which hinged largely on the factory question" but (if the newspapers supporting the rival parties reported the campaign with any accuracy) (Note: William Cobbett called Edward Baines the editor of the Whig paper "Brougham's grand puffer, THE GREAT LIAR OF THE NORTH, publisher of that mass of lies and nonsense called the Leeds Mercury ...this swelled up greedy and unprincipled puffer who has been the deluder of Yorkshire for twenty years past." Cobbett's Political Register 24 November 1832) after this meeting factory reform was never a major campaign issue; in its account of the next week's canvassing the Intelligencer noted Sadler to have raised the issue, but reported in detail only his denial that he had taken up the issue for electioneering purposes – no millchild had a vote, nor did their mothers, nor (as the Whigs had been careful to ensure) did any but a handful of their fathers: its report of the following week has nothing on the subject. Equally, if not an issue, it may have been a factor: Richard Oastler later said that Sadler's efforts on behalf of the factory children had "offended some of the Tory party of Leeds" and the contemporary papers give no indication of support for Sadler by the Gotts, leading millowners and prominent supporters of the Tory candidate in the 1834 elections. (Note: The Leeds Mercury alleged the Gotts (and other less conspicuous Tory millowners) to be hanging back, their objection being to Sadler's association with the organised working-class – in 1831 Gott's had suffered a 33-week strike by their weavers; £5–6,000 had been raised by sympathisers with the strikers. The report of the Factory Commission of 1833 alleged that the Short Time Committees and the union leadership had overlapping membership) Sadler's previous speeches and actions meant that there were substantive differences between the candidates on church rates, the Corn Laws and close corporations; these were supplemented by repeated claims by Whig supporters that Sadler's declared views on other issues were not his real views; he pretended to be the friend of the poor so that he could return to being the lackey of the Duke of Newcastle. Macaulay called Sadler 'a convenient philanthropist' and likened him to 'the Hyaena who, when it wishes to decoy the unwary into its den, has a singular knack of imitating the cries of little children . . .'. The 'hard fight' descended further into personalities; the accusation that Sadler had deserted Methodism for Anglicanism from worldly motives and now despised Methodists was repeated; countered by Sadler's supporters by an assertion that no orthodox Christian should vote for Marshall or Macaulay as they were both Socinians, which accusation the Whigs met with the revelation that Sadler was "sadly addicted to PROFANE SWEARING" and had "attended the SUNDAY parties of a certain Dowager not noted for keeping all the Ten Commandments" When the result was declared, Marshall had 2012 votes, and Macaulay 1984; Sadler failed to be elected, trailing badly with 1596 votes

== Final years ==
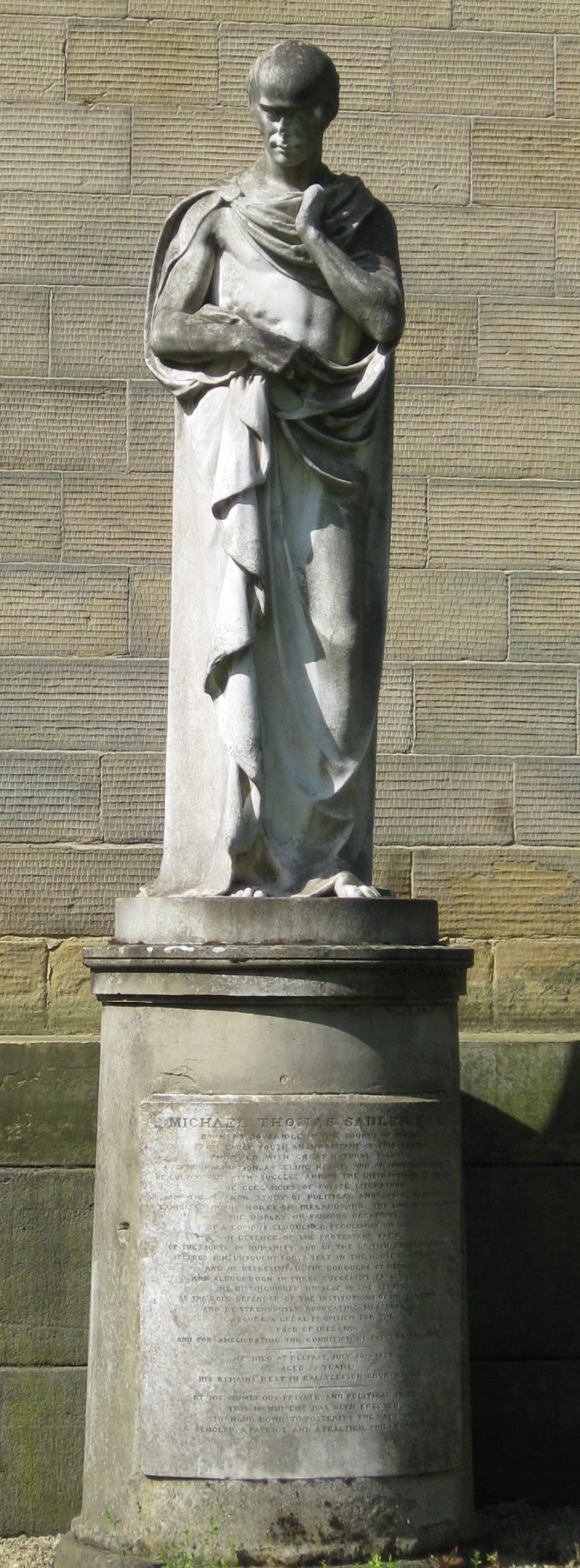
Monument in Woodhouse Cemetery, erected by public subscription

=== Fate of the Ten Hour Bill ===
Extracts from 'the report of Mr Sadler's Committee' began to appear in newspapers in January 1833 and painted a picture of the life of a mill-child as one of systematic over-work and systematic brutality. The conclusion many papers drew was that Sadler's Bill should be revived and passed. Lord Ashley, eldest son of the 6th Earl of Shaftesbury, took Sadler's place as the leading spokesman in Parliament for the factory reform movement, and reintroduced the Bill. However MPs criticised both the report (since the only witnesses heard had been Sadler's, the report was unbalanced; since witnesses had not testified on oath, doubts were expressed about the accuracy/veracity of the more lurid accounts of factory life) and Sadler's conduct. 'An air of ridicule and extravagance' had been thrown not upon factory legislation, but upon the use of Select Committees for fact-finding on factory conditions. A Factory Commission was set up to investigate and report. Sadler and the Short Time Committees objected to any further fact-finding and attempted to obstruct the work of the Commissioners. Ashley's Bill proceeded to a Second Reading in early July 1833 (when the likely main recommendations of the commission were known, but its report was not yet available to MPs); Ashley wanted the Bill to then be considered by a Committee of the whole House and defeated Lord Althorp's amendment to refer the Bill to a Select Committee. However at Committee stage the first point considered where the Bill differed from the commission's was the age up to which hours of work should be limited Ashley lost (heavily) the vote on this, and left it to Althorp to pilot through a Factory Act based upon the commission's recommendations.

=== Huddersfield by-election 1834 ===
In the autumn of 1834, it became clear that a by-election at Leeds was imminent as Macaulay intended to resign his seat in Parliament. It was widely assumed that Sadler would be the Tory candidate. However, there was an unexpected by-election at Huddersfield. The Whig MP elected in 1832, had been opposed only by a Radical (Captain Wood) : since then Wood had converted to Catholicism and felt (or was advised) that this made it unlikely that he would win the by-election. Wood therefore advised his supporters to invite Sadler to stand as a Tory with Radical support. Whig papers then publicised allegations by John Foster, a former editor of the Leeds Patriot. The Patriot had been a Radical paper supporting the Ten-Hour movement which had been bankrupted by the legal costs of preparing to defend a libel action. Foster said that he had been promised that the Ten-Hour committee would pay all his legal costs and had not done so; that Sadler had promised before the Leeds election to pay a handsome price for the Patriot and reneged on the agreement post-election; that money collected for the Ten-Hour campaign had been misappropriated by Oastler; and that Sadler had been evasive and duplicitous. This mud-slinging aside, there were also underlying policy differences between the Tories and the Radicals (e.g. attitude to the Corn Laws) and the passage of Althorp's Factory Act had for the moment removed the Ten-Hour Bill as a cause behind which they could easily unite. For whichever reason, the Huddersfield Radicals refused to support Sadler (whose campaign was already well under way) and persuaded Wood to stand as their candidate. At the election, Sadler came second with 147 votes, Wood third (108), behind the successful Whig candidate (234 votes).

This was the last election at which he stood: requisitioned to stand at the Leeds by-election, he declined the invitation. He and his family moved in July 1834 to Belfast, where he died in 1835 and was buried in Ballylesson churchyard. There is a Grade II listed statue of Sadler in St George's Fields (the former Woodhouse Cemetery) in Leeds.

== Major works ==
- Ireland, Its Evils and their Remedies(first published 1828)
- The Law of Population: A Treatise, in Six Books (first published 1830)
- Report of the Select Committee on his Factory Regulation Bill, 1832

=== Minor works ===
- A refutation of an article in the Edinburgh Review (1830 : the article was the review by Thomas Babington Macaulay of Sadler's Law of Population)
- The Factory Girl's Last Day a poem

== Notes ==
Parliament of the United Kingdom
Preceded by Sir William Henry Clinton; Henry Willoughby	Member of Parliament for Newark; 1829 – 1831; With: Henry Willoughby to February 1831; William Farnworth Handley from February 1831	Succeeded by Thomas Wilde; William Farnworth Handley
Preceded by Viscount Stormont; Clinton Fynes Clinton	Member of Parliament for Aldborough; 1831 – 1832; With: Clinton Fynes Clinton	Constituency abolished
