= John Sadler =

John Sadler may refer to:

- John Sadler, English merchant, co-founder of the Merchant's Hope plantation, Virginia, in 1638
- John Sadler (town clerk) (1615–1674), English MP, lawyer, Town Clerk of London and Master of Magdalene College, Cambridge
- John Sadler, English printer, inventor of transfer-printing in 1756
- John Sadler (industrialist) (1820–1910), English industrialist and public servant associated with Oldbury, West Midlands
- John W. Sadler (born 1956), American racehorse trainer
- John Sadler (historian), British historian
- John Sadler (cricketer) (born 1981), English cricketer
