= The Sleeping Girl of Turville =

British sleeper

Turville, shown within Buckinghamshire, UK

Ellen Sadler (15 May 1859 – October 1946), sometimes called The Sleeping Girl of Turville, was a resident of Turville, a small village in Buckinghamshire in the United Kingdom. In 1871, aged eleven, she reportedly fell asleep and did not wake for nine years. The case attracted international attention from newspapers, medical professionals and the public.

Born to a large, impoverished family of farm workers, Ellen was sent to work as a nursemaid at the age of eleven. Soon afterwards, she began suffering periods of drowsiness and was referred to a local hospital. After four months, her condition was declared incurable, and she was sent home. Two days later, Ellen had a series of seizures and—her mother claimed—fell into a deep sleep from which she could not be roused.

Ellen became a tourist attraction for the village, and her family made considerable money from visitors' donations. As the years progressed with no sign of Ellen's waking, speculation grew that her illness was either a hoax or caused by her mother, an issue that was never resolved. In late 1880, soon after her mother's death, Ellen awoke. She later married and had at least five children.

== Background ==
Ellen Sadler was born on 15 May 1859 to Ann and William Sadler, who lived in the small village of Turville, Buckinghamshire. The Sadlers were a large, impoverished family, most of them agricultural labourers; Ellen, the youngest child, shared her home with her eleven siblings. Ellen's father died while she was an infant; Ann Sadler subsequently married Thomas Frewen.

== Illness ==
=== Initial symptoms ===
In 1870, aged eleven, Ellen began work as a nursemaid in nearby Marlow, but she began suffering periods of somnolence and her employment was terminated. She was subsequently attended by a doctor, Henry Hayman F.R.C.S., from nearby Stokenchurch. Ellen had been suffering for 13 weeks from "glandular swellings" or an abscess on the back of her head and had symptoms consistent with a spinal disease. The family did not have much money so the parish vicar, The Reverend Studholme, asked Hayman to secure Ellen's admission to a local hospital, (Note: In 1873, Hayman refers to the hospital as the "County Infirmary"; in 1880, he names "Reading Hospital".) where her condition worsened. Ellen stayed at the hospital for 18 weeks before being "discharged as incurable" in March 1871. (Note: Hospital records indicate Ellen's age at the time of her admission as nine years; however most sources say she was eleven by the time of her subsequent illness, which began two days after her discharge.)

=== Fall into unconsciousness ===
"The mother's narrative is that she told the little girl to pray, and that they prayed together—the child rocking herself to and from with her hands clasped, gradually losing command over herself and growing more and more convulsed, her eyes rolling wildly and her limbs twitching. When [Dr Hayman] arrived, to use her expression 'the child was fixen down.' That is to say, she had sunk into a state of insensibility, in which she now remains."
—A journalist recounts Ann Frewen's tale of the night Ellen fell ill.

According to Ellen's mother, upon the girl's return home on a rickety cart, she began to feel drowsy and had several seizures. Hayman states that it was two days after her discharge that the seizures occurred. He visited Ellen at her home, where he was told that the previous night, 17 March, (Note: Other sources say March 27 and March 29; however, as the attending doctor, Hayman is more likely to have known the correct date.) Ellen had endured a series of such attacks, after which she turned to lie "on her left side, with her hand under her head, and the lower extremities drawn upwards". It was in this position that—her mother maintained—Ellen remained for the duration of her sleep. Hayman visited Ellen many times over the next few years and he later said that he "never found her otherwise".

Ellen became something of a tourist attraction for Turville. She was visited by journalists, medical professionals, religious personnel and the "plain curious" (Note: Rumours persist that Ellen was visited by royalty, possibly the Prince of Wales, but there is no supporting evidence.) from across the country, many of whom donated money to Ellen's family to be allowed to see her. Some paid to take cuts of Ellen's hair, until the "supply" began to run out. A Bucks Free Press journalist recounted his visit:

Her breathing was regular and natural, the skin soft and the body warm, as in a healthy subject; the pulse rather fast. The hands were small and thin, but the fingers quite flexible; the body somewhat emaciated; the feet and legs like those of a dead child, almost ice cold ... the aspect of her features was pleasant, more so than might be expected under the circumstances ... her eyes and cheeks were sunken, and the appearance was that of death ... but although there was no colour on her cheeks, the paleness was not that heavy hue which betokens death.

A correspondent from The Daily Telegraph visited Ellen about 22 months after she fell ill. He wrote:

The girl's face is by no means cadaverous. There is flesh on the cheeks, which have a pinkish tint, and there is some colour in the thin lips. The eyes are calmly closed, as though in healthy sleep. I ventured to raise one of the lids and touch the eye beneath ... but there was not even a quivering of the eyelash. ... The girl's [hand] was quite warm and moist, and the finger nails were neatly trimmed. The fingers are not the least bit stiffened ... It is not a skeleton hand, neither are any of the girl's limbs so emaciated as, under the extraordinary circumstances alleged, might be expected. ... The child's body is very thin as compared with her limbs. ... There is not much substance in her flesh, however; it is soft and flabby ... [Her feet were] almost ice-cold. ... As regards the child's breathing, it is so feeble that it is almost impossible to detect it; you cannot feel it by holding the cheek to her mouth, and the only faintest flutter is felt when the hand is laid over the region of the heart. (Note: Aspects of the correspondent's account conflict with the known facts. Although there is no doubt that the child of which he speaks is Ellen Sadler, he names her as "Ann Trilling", Ellen's mother's maiden name. He names William Sadler as Ann's second husband, and the physician Hayman, from Stokenchurch, as "Dr Hammond" from "Stock Church". He also recounts Ellen's mother's claim that the condition was not unique in the family. Before her husband died, Ann said, he "lay for three weeks speechless and motionless". Warning the reader to bear in mind that there was no evidence to this effect, the journalist also detailed Ann's claim that her brother-in-law had died after six months in the same condition.)

By March 1873, Ellen was believed to be suffering from starvation. At first, she had largely subsisted on port, tea and milk, given three times per day. After about 15 months—while her mother was attempting to administer arrowroot—Ellen's jaw locked closed. Subsequently, according to Hayman, she was fed "wine, gruel and other things" using the "spout of a toy teapot inserted between two broken teeth". The Daily Telegraph journalist expanded on Ellen's feeding: "The feeding implements stand on a little table by the side of the stump bedstead, and, at first sight, give you the idea that they are toys placed there to attract her attention should she, by a merciful termination of her trance, presently awake to life. The toys in question are two tiny 'teapots', each not much larger than a full-sized walnut and holding four small teaspoonfuls. One of these is filled with port wine, and the other with milk ... this quantity of liquid nourishment ... cannot weigh more than half an ounce ..." At this time, it was considered "manifestly out of the question to think of moving her". How the family dealt with Ellen's passing of urine and faeces is unclear, but in 1880, Hayman said that Ann Frewen told him that no bowel movements had occurred for five years, and that approximately every four days "a somewhat large amount would pass from the bladder".

=== Scepticism ===
Some visitors were sceptical of Ellen's illness and attempted to uncover the alleged ruse through methods such as stabbing her with pins, to no effect. The Bucks Free Press journalist was suspicious of Ann's practice of making visitors wait before seeing Ellen. Some neighbours were also "deeply sceptical", as Ellen's family was making a "healthy profit" from her illness. During summers, the family was taking as much as £2 per week (£208 as of 2025). Others said they sometimes saw Ellen sitting by her window at night. Ann consented to "fair tests", but further suspicions were raised because medical personnel were not allowed to remain for too long, and Ann did not want Ellen to be moved to a hospital. Nor was Ellen listed as an invalid during the 1871 census. Hayman said that Ann was reluctant to allow handling of her daughter by medical personnel because they often concealed sharp objects with which to "test [Ellen's] powers of feeling". Her parents had also "strenuously opposed" Hayman's recommendation to run an electric current through Ellen's sleeping body.

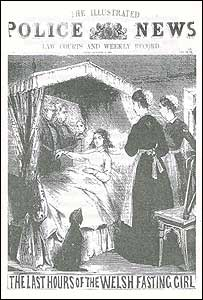
Sceptics of Ellen's condition drew comparison with the case of the Welsh "fasting girl", Sarah Jacob.

Much speculation appeared in the press as to the cause of Ellen's illness; some linked the case to that of Sarah Jacob, a girl from Wales who, her parents claimed, was able to survive without nourishment, through divine intervention. Sarah died of starvation in 1869, and her parents were subsequently convicted of manslaughter. A journalist for The Observer commented, "It is to be hoped that [Sarah's case] is known in the obscure village of Turville, where—we are asked to believe—a fresh case of miraculous trance has taken place. ... [Ellen's case] very much ... incites suspicion of deliberate imposture." One correspondent to The Times wrote, "It is by widespread publicity that such cases are multiplied, and it is difficult to overstate the harm thus done. These impostures exist through a morbid love of sympathy on the part of the children, or from the gains that accrue to the parents. Once begun, they soon pass into real disease." Another said the "ridiculous mystery" could be resolved if only Ellen were transferred, over her mother's continued objections, to a London hospital, a sentiment echoed by many. Claims that Ellen was suffering from a form of catalepsy—a condition at the time considered "so rare that not one physician in a thousand has so much as seen a single case of it"—were also disregarded as unlikely, as was any thought of religious ecstasy.

Nevertheless, Hayman affirmed, "every effort [had] been made to discover the deception, if any, but without effect." The Home Secretary and local Magistrate corresponded about the case but the law was powerless to interfere, because despite accepting donations, Ellen's family never asked for money outright, and she "was not represented as a 'fasting girl'", as Sarah Jacob had been. The Daily Telegraph journalist said, "[Ann Frewen]'s manner is that of a perfectly honest woman who would be too glad if her child could be restored to consciousness." He spoke to neighbours, none of whom indicated anything other than trust in Ellen's parents and Hayman, and claimed that the family was receiving no money from Ellen's illness, although the latter point is contradicted by Hayman and others. The journalist concluded, "I have no medical knowledge, and [am] unqualified to give an opinion beyond what is justified by close observation of the ordinary kind. I went to Turville prepared to find an imposture. I have returned—puzzled."

=== Recovery ===
Ann Frewen died in May 1880. The inquest into her death was held at the nearby Bull and Butcher public house, presided over by the county coroner, Frederick Charsley. Part of the inquest's remit was to consider the matter of Ellen's subsequent care. Thomas Frewen was reported as being "quite evasive" when the coroner asked him how Ellen was fed, and although Hayman testified to reaffirm his stance that Ellen's illness was genuine, Reverend Studholme was less certain. However, he could not offer any evidence to this effect, even though he had made several unannounced visits to Ellen's home. Charsley concluded that Thomas could not look after Ellen, as his job left him absent from their home all day, and that the other members of the household would be too busy with its upkeep. Therefore, he turned Ellen's care over to her married sisters, Elizabeth Stacey and Grace Blackall, both of whom lived in Turville. The cause of Ann's death was found to be oedema of the heart, from which she had been suffering for many years.

Five months later, Ellen awoke; (Note: Some sources list December 1880 rather than October; however, the former appears merely to be the date Ellen's recovery was reported in the press.) by November, she had "fully recovered". By this time, Ellen was 21 and claimed to remember nothing of the previous nine years. She otherwise suffered few long-term effects, save for slightly stunted growth and a "weak eye".

== Later life and legacy ==
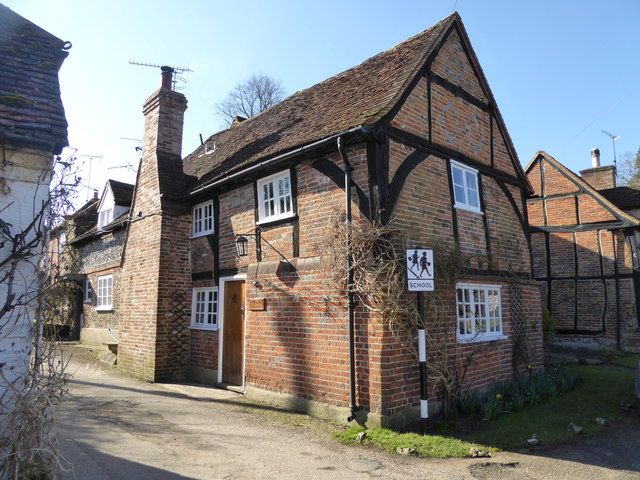
Ellen Sadler's family home in Turville, Buckinghamshire. Later named "Sleepy Cottage" after Ellen's case, and also used during filming of the BBC sitcom The Vicar of Dibley.

In 1886, Ellen married Mark Blackall (Note: Speculated to be related to her brother-in-law.) in nearby Fawley. In the censuses of 1891 and 1901, the pair are listed as living in Barkham and Caversham, respectively. They had five children: Ann (b. 1888), Elizabeth or Mable (b. 1889), Gladys (b. 1890), Sydney (b. 1896) and Gertrude (b. 1898). Ellen and Mark appear in the 1911 census together with Sydney and Gertrude, all living in Lower Caversham. The census also records that they had had six children, one of whom had died.

The case of Ellen Sadler has remained a part of local folklore, spawning tales of witchcraft and rumours of royal attention in Turville. The Sadler family home became known as Sleepy Cottage and was used for filming the BBC situation comedy The Vicar of Dibley. No clear cause has ever been ascribed for Ellen's condition; modern diagnoses might include narcolepsy or deliberate drugging, and the possibility that it was a hoax cannot be discounted. An embellished account of the story can be found in the 1973 collection Witchcraft in the Thames Valley by Tony Barham.

== See also ==
- Kleine–Levin syndrome
- Münchausen syndrome by proxy
