= Saddler (disambiguation) =

Saddler or Saddlers may refer to:

- Saddlery, the occupation of making saddles and other horse tack
- Kentucky saddler, a breed of horse
- SS-7 Saddler, an intercontinental ballistic missile
- Osmund Saddler, character in Resident Evil 4
- Saddlers, a town in Saint John Capesterre Parish, Saint Kitts and Nevis
- "The Saddlers", a nickname for Walsall Football Club, based in Walsall, West Midlands
- Worshipful Company of Saddlers, a livery company and former guild in London

== People ==
- Dan Saddler (born 1961), American politician
- Donald Saddler (1918–2014), American choreographer and dancer
- Ron Saddler, Australian rugby league footballer
- Sandy Saddler (1926–2001), American boxer

== See also ==
- Saddle
- Sadleir (disambiguation)
- Sadler (disambiguation)
