= William Sadler =

William Sadler may refer to:

- William Sadler (painter) (c. 1782–1839), Irish landscape painter
- William Sadler (Medal of Honor) (1854–?), American sailor and Medal of Honor recipient
- William Sadler (actor) (born 1950), American film and television actor
- William S. Sadler (1875–1969), American surgeon and psychiatrist
- William Richard Sadler, American politician from Pennsylvania
- Billy Sadler (born 1981), American baseball pitcher
- Bubby Sadler (William Andrew Sadler, 1909–1987), American Negro league baseball player
- Bill Sadler (engineer) (William George Sadler, born 1931), Canadian race car designer, electrical and electronics engineer, aviation designer
