= Jim Sadler =

Australian rules footballer

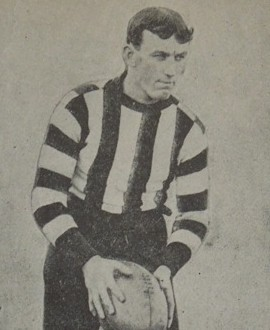
- Sadler in 1910

Personal information
- Full name: James Michael Sadler
- Born: 28 July 1886; Allansford, Victoria
- Died: 19 July 1975 (aged 88); Parkville, Victoria
- Original team: Allansford
- Debut: Round 3, 16 May 1908, Collingwood vs. University, at East Melbourne

Playing career^{1}
Years	Club	Games (Goals)
1908–1917	Collingwood	135 (5)
- ^{1} Playing statistics correct to the end of 1917.

Career highlights
- 1910 Premiership Team

Jim Sadler (28 July 1886 – 19 July 1975) was an Australian rules footballer who played for Collingwood in the Victorian Football League (VFL).

Sadler played in 135 games over ten years for Collingwood in the VFL. He was Collingwood's back pocket player in the 1910 Grand Final win over Carlton.

Sadler also played in Collingwood's losing Grand Final teams in 1911 and 1915.
