= History of labour law in the United Kingdom =

The history of labour law in the United Kingdom concerns the development of UK labour law, from its roots in Roman and medieval times in the British Isles up to the present. Before the Industrial Revolution and the introduction of mechanised manufacture, regulation of workplace relations was based on status, rather than contract or mediation through a system of trade unions. Serfdom was the prevailing status of the mass of people, except where artisans in towns could gain a measure of self-regulation through guilds. The law of the land was, under the Act of Apprentices 1563, that wages in each district should be assessed by justices of the peace. From the middle of the 19th century, through acts such as the Master and Servant Act 1867 (30 & 31 Vict. c. 141) and the Employers and Workmen Act 1875 (38 & 39 Vict. c. 90), there became growing recognition that greater protection was needed to promote the health and safety of workers, as well as preventing unfair practices in wage contracts.

== Anglo-Saxon England ==
Of the main conditions of industrial labour in early Anglo-Saxon England details are scanty. Monastic industrial communities were added in Christian times to village industrial communities. While generally husbandry was the first object of toil, and developed under elaborate regulation in the manorial system, still a considerable variety of industries grew up, the aim being expressly to make each social group self-sufficing, and to protect and regulate village artisans in the interest of village resources. This protective system, resting on a communal or co-operative view of labour and social life, has been compared as analogous to the much later and wider system under which the main purpose was to keep England as a whole self-sufficing.

== Medieval England ==
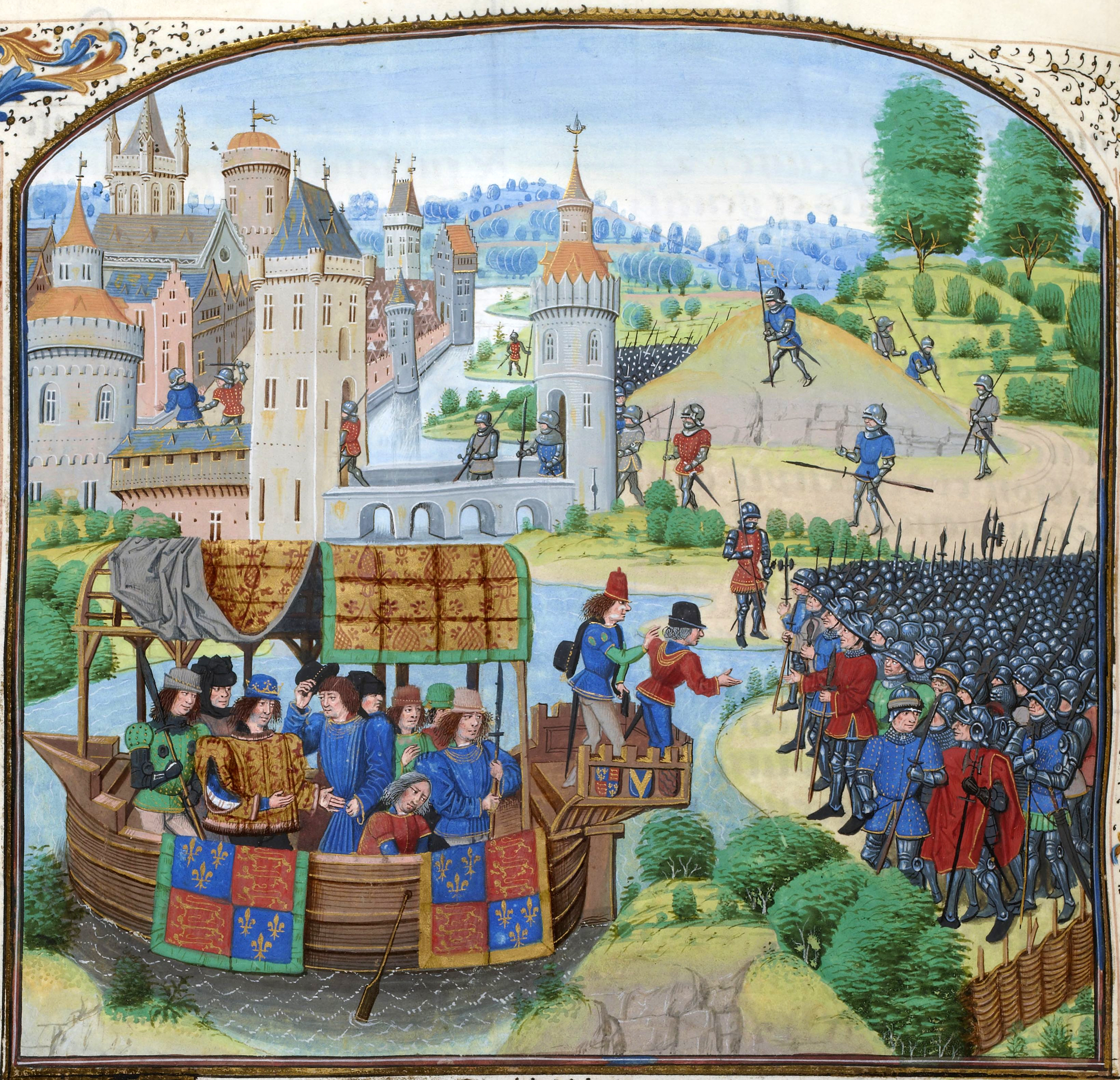
Richard II meets the Peasants' Revolt rebels in a painting from Froissart's Chronicles.

It has also been shown how greatly a fresh spirit of enterprise in industry and trade was stimulated first by the Danish and next by the Norman invasion; the former brought in a vigour shown in growth of villages, increase in number of freemen, and formation of trading towns; the latter especially opened up new communications with the most civilised continental people, and was followed by a considerable immigration of artisans, particularly of Flemings. In Saxon England slavery in the strictest sense existed, as is shown in the earliest English laws, but it seems that the true slave class as distinct from the serf class was comparatively small, and it may well be that the labour of an ordinary serf was not practically more severe, and the remuneration in maintenance and kind not much less than that of agricultural labourers in recent times. In spite of the steady protest of the Church, slavery (as the exception, not the general rule) did not die out for many centuries, and was apt to be revived as a punishment for criminals, e.g. in the fierce provisions of the statute of Edward VI against beggars, not repealed until the passing of the Vagabonds Act 1597 (39 Eliz. 1. c. 4). At no time, however, was it general, and as the larger village and city populations grew the ratio of serfs and slaves to the freemen in the whole population rapidly diminished, for the city populations "had not the habit and use of slavery," and while serfs might sometimes find a refuge in the cities from exceptionally severe taskmasters, "there is no doubt that freemen gradually united with them under the lord's protection, that strangers engaged in trade sojourned among them, and that a race of artisans gradually grew up in which original class feelings were greatly modified."

=== Boroughs, guilds and agricultural labour ===
From these conditions grew two parallel tendencies in regulation of labour. On the one hand there was, under royal charters, the burgh or municipal organisation and control of artisan and craft labour, passing later into the more specialised organisation in craft guilds; on the other hand, there was a necessity, sometimes acute, to prevent undue diminution in the numbers available for husbandry or agricultural labour. To the latter cause must be traced a provision appearing in a succession of statutes, especially the Statute of Cambridge 1388 (12 Ric. 2. c. 5), that a child under twelve years once employed in agriculture might never be transferred to apprenticeship in a craft. The steady development of England, first as a woolgrowing, later as a cloth-producing country, would accentuate this difficulty. During the 13th century, side by side with development of trading companies for the export of wool from England, may be noted many agreements on the part of monasteries to sell their wool to Florentines, and during the same century absorption of alien artisans into the municipal system was practically completed. Charters of Henry I. provided for naturalisation of these aliens.

=== Trend towards statute law ===
From the time of Edward I to Edward III a gradual transference of burgh customs, so far as recognised for the common good, to statute law was in progress, together with an assertion of the rights of the Crown against ecclesiastical orders. The statutes of Edward I, says Dr. Cunningham, "mark the first attempt to deal with Industry and Trade as a public matter which concerns the whole state, not as the particular affair of leading men in each separate locality." The first direct legislation for labour by statute, however, is not earlier than the twenty-third year of the reign of Edward III, and it arose in an attempt to control the decay and ruin, both in rural and urban districts, which followed the Hundred Years' War, and the pestilence known as the Black Death. This first Statute of Labourers was designed for the benefit of the community, not for the protection of labour or prevention of oppression, and the policy of enforcing customary wages and compelling the able-bodied labourer, whether free or bond, not living in merchandise or exercising any craft, to work for hire at recognised rates of pay, must be reviewed in the circumstances and ideals of the time.

Regulation generally in the Middle Ages aimed at preventing any individual or section of the community from making what was considered an exceptional profit through the necessity of others. The scarcity of labour by the reduction of the population through pestilence was not admitted as a justification for the demands for increased pay, and while the unemployed labourer was liable to be committed to jail if he refused service at current rates, the lords of the towns or manors who promised or paid more to their servants were liable to be sued treble the sum in question. Similar restrictions were made applicable to artificers and workmen. By another statute, two years later, labourers or artificers who left their work and went into another county were liable to be arrested by the sheriff and brought back. These and similar provisions with similar aims were confirmed by the Labourers (No. 2) Act 1361 (34 Edw. 3. c. 10), Labourers Act 1368 (42 Edw. 3. c. 6) and the Statute of Cambridge 1388 (12 Ric. 2. c. 7), but the act of 1360, while prohibiting "all alliances and covins of masons, carpenters, congregations, chapters, ordinances and oaths betwixt them made," allowed "every lord to bargain or covenant for their works in gross with such labourers and artificers when it pleaseth them, so that they perform such works well and lawfully according to the bargain and covenant with them thereof made."

Powers were given by the acts of 1368 and 1388 to justices to determine matters under these statutes and to fix wages. Records show that workmen of various descriptions were pressed by writs addressed to sheriffs to work for their king at wages regardless of their will as to terms and place of work. These proceedings were founded on notions of royal prerogative, of which impressment of seamen survived as an example to a far later date. By the Statute of Cambridge 1388 no servant or labourer, man or woman, however, could depart out of the hundred to serve elsewhere unless bearing a letters patent under the king's seal stating the cause of going and time of return. Such provisions would appear to have widely failed in their purpose, for the Quarter Sessions Act 1414 (2 Hen. 5. Stat. 1 c. 4) declares that the servants and labourers fled from county to county, and justices were empowered to send writs to the sheriffs for fugitive labourers as for felons, and to examine labourers, servants and their masters, as well as artificers, and to punish them on confession.

And moreover, That the justices of peace have power to send their writs for such fugitive labourers, to every sheriff of the realm of England, and to make such process as the statute requireth, to bring them before them to answer to our sovereign lord the King, and to the parties, of the contempts and trespasses made or done against the ordinances and statutes aforesaid, in like manner as the justices have power to send to every sheriff for the felons before them indicted. — Quarter Sessions Act 1414 (2 Hen. 5. Stat. 1 c. 4) s. 3

=== Fifteenth century ===
The Labourers Act 1405 (7 Hen. 4. c. 17), while putting a property qualification on apprenticeship and requiring parents under heavy penalties to put their children to such labour as their estates required, made an exception, giving freedom to any person "to send their children to school to learn literature." Up to the end of the fifteenth century a monotonous succession of statutes strengthening, modifying, amending the various attempts (since the first Statute of Labourers) to limit free movement of labour, or demands by labourers for increased wages, may be seen in the acts of 1411, 1427 (6 Hen. 6. c. 3), 1444 (23 Hen. 6. c. 12), and the Wages of Labourers, etc. Act 1495 (11 Hen. 7. c. 22). It was clearly found extremely difficult, if not impracticable, to carry out the minute control of wages considered desirable, and exceptions in favour of certain occupations were in some of the statutes themselves. The penalties for giving wages contrary to law were repealed by the Wages of Labourers, etc. Act 1512 (4 Hen. 8. c. 5) so far as related to masters, but it also appears that London workmen would not endure the prevalent restrictions as to wages, and that they secured in practice a greater freedom to arrange rates when working within the city. Several of these statutes, and especially the Artificers and Labourers Act 1514 (6 Hen. 8. c. 3), fixed the hours of labour when limiting wages. During March to September the limits were 5 a.m. to 7 or 8 p.m., with half an hour off for breakfast and an hour and a half off for midday dinner. In winter the outside limits were fixed by the length of daylight.

==== Cloth manufacture ====
Throughout the 15th century the rapidly increasing manufacture of cloth was subject to a regulation which aimed at maintaining the standard of production and prevention of bad workmanship, and the noteworthy statute the Cloths Act 1464 (4 Edw. 4. c. 1), while giving power to royal officers to supervise size of cloths, modes of sealing, etc., also repressed payment to workers in "pins, girdles and unprofitable wares," and ordained payment in true and lawful money. This statute (the first against "truck") gives an interesting picture of the way in which clothiers—or, as we should call them, wholesale merchants and manufacturers—delivered wool to spinners, carders, etc., by weight, and paid for the work when brought back finished. It appears that the work was carried on in rural as well as town districts. While this industry was growing and thriving other trades remained backward, and agriculture was in a depressed condition. Craft guilds had primarily the same purpose as the Edwardian statutes, that is, of securing that the public should be well served with good wares, and that the trade and manufacture itself should be on a sound basis as to quality of products and should flourish. Incidentally there was considerable regulation by the guilds of the conditions of labour, but not primarily in the interests of the labourer. Thus night work was prohibited because it tended to secrecy and so to bad execution of work; working on holidays was prohibited to secure fair play between craftsmen and so on. The position of apprentices was made clear through indentures, but the position of journeymen was less certain. Signs are not wanting of a struggle between journeymen and masters, and towards the end of the 15th century masters themselves, in at least the great wool trade, tended to develop from craftsmen into something more like the modern capitalist employer; from the Weavers Act 1555 (2 & 3 Ph. & M. c. 11) it is quite clear that this development had greatly advanced and that cloth-making was carried on largely by employers with large capitals. Before this, however, while a struggle went on between the town authorities and the craft guilds, journeymen began to form companies of their own, and the result of the various conflicts may be seen in the Guilds and Fraternities Act 1436 (15 Hen. 6. c. 6), providing that in future new ordinances of guilds shall be submitted to justices of the peace—a measure which was strengthened by the Ordinances of Corporations Act 1503 (19 Hen. 7. c. 7).

== Renaissance ==
A detailed history of labour regulation in the 16th century would include some account of the Tudor laws against vagrancy and methods of dealing with the increase of pauperism, attributable, at least in part, to the Dissolution of the Monasteries under Henry VIII, and to the confiscation of craft guild funds, which proceeded under the Lord Protector Somerset and Edward VI. It is sufficient here to point to the general recognition of the public right to compel labourers to work and thus secure control of unemployed as well as employed. The statutes of Henry VIII and Edward VI against vagrancy differed rather in degree of severity than in principle from legislation for similar purposes in previous and subsequent reigns.

The Statute of Artificers 1562 (5 Eliz. 1. c. 4), passed in the fifth year of Elizabeth I of England's reign, as well as the poor law of the same year, was to a considerable extent both a consolidating and an amending code of law, and was so securely based on public opinion and deeply rooted custom that it was maintained in force for two centuries. It avowedly approves of principles and aims in earlier acts, regulating wages, punishing refusal to work, and preventing free migration of labour. It makes, however, a great advance in its express aim of protecting the poor labourer against insufficient wages, and of devising a machinery, by frequent meeting of justices, which might yield "unto the hired person both in time of scarcity and in time of plenty a convenient proportion of wages." Minute regulations were made governing the contract between master and servant, and their mutual rights and obligations on parallel lines for artificers and labourers in husbandry. Hiring was to be by the year, and any unemployed person qualified in either calling was bound to accept service on pain of imprisonment, if required, unless possessed of property of a specified amount or engaged in art, science or letters, or being a "gentleman." Persons leaving a service were bound to obtain a testimonial, and might not be taken into fresh employment without producing such testimonial, or, if in a new district, until after showing it to the authorities of the place. A master might be fined or a labourer imprisoned, and if contumacious, whipped, for breach of this rule. The carefully devised scheme for technical training of apprentices embodied to a considerable extent the methods and experiences of the craft guilds. Hours of labour were as follows:

"All artificers and labourers being hired for wages by the day or week shall, betwixt the midst of the months of March and September, be and continue at their work at or before 5 o'clock in the morning and continue at work and not depart until betwixt 7 and 8 o'clock at night, except it be in the time of breakfast, dinner or drinking, the which time at the most shall not exceed two hours and a half in a day, that is to say, at every drinking half an hour, for his dinner one hour and for his sleep when he is allowed to sleep, the which is from the midst of May to the midst of August, half an hour; and all the said artificers and labourers betwixt the midst of September and the midst of March shall be and continue at their work from the spring of the day in the morning until the night of the same day, except it be in time afore appointed for breakfast and dinner, upon pain to lose and forfeit one penny for every hour's absence, to be deducted and defaulted out of his wages that shall so offend."

Although the standpoint of the Factory Act and Truck Act in force at the beginning of the 20th century as regards hours of labour or regulation of fines deducted from wages is completely reversed, yet the difference is not great between the average length of hours of labour permissible under the present law for women and those hours imposed upon the adult labourer in Elizabeth's statute. Apart from the standpoint of compulsory imposition of fines, one advantage in the definiteness of amount deductible from wages would appear to lie on the side of the earlier statute.

Three points remain to be touched on in connection with the Elizabethan poor law. In addition to

- consolidation of measures for setting vagrants to work, we find the first compulsory contributions from the well-to-do towards poor relief there provided for,
- at least a theoretical recognition of a right as well as an obligation on the part of the labourer to be hired,
- careful provision for the apprenticing of destitute children and orphans to a trade.

The Statute of Artificers 1562 required "some reasonable and sufficient cause or matter" to justify firing an employee. Originally English courts treated an employment to last for one year, where the contract was silent.

=== Scotland ===
One provision of considerable interest arose in Scotland, which was nearly a century later in organising provisions for fixing conditions of hire and wages of workmen, labourers and servants, similar to those consolidated in the English Statute of Artificers 1562. In 1617 it was provided (and reaffirmed in 1661) that power should be given to the sheriffs to compel payment of wages, "that servants may be the more willing to obey the ordinance." The difficulties in regulation of compulsory labour in Scotland must, however, have been great, for in 1672 houses of correction were erected for disobedient servants, and masters of these houses were empowered to force them to work and to correct them according to their demerits. While servants in manufacture were compelled to work at reasonable rates they might not enter on a new hire without their previous master's consent.

== Industrial Revolution ==
Such legislation continued, at least theoretically, in force until the awakening affected by the beginning of the Industrial Revolution—that is, until the combined effects of steady concentration of capital in the hands of employers and expansion of trade, followed closely by an unexampled development of invention in machinery and application of power to its use completely altered the face of industrial England. From time to time, in respect of particular trades, provisions against truck and for payment of wages in current coin, similar to the act of Edward IV in the woollen industry, were found necessary, and this branch of labour legislation developed through the reigns of Anne and the four Georges until consolidation and amendment were effected, after the completion of the industrial revolution, in the Truck Act 1831 (1 & 2 Will. 4. c. 37). From the close of the seventeenth century and during the eighteenth century the legislature is no longer mainly engaged in devising means for compelling labourers and artisans to enter into involuntary service, but rather in regulating the summary powers of justices of the peace in the matter of dispute between masters and servants in relation to contracts and agreements, express or implied, presumed to have been entered into voluntarily on both sides. While the movement to refer labour questions to the jurisdiction of the justices thus gradually developed, the main subject matter for their exercise of jurisdiction in regard to labour also changed, even when theoretically for a time the two sets of powers—such as

(a) moderation of craft guild ordinances and punishment of workers refusing hire, or
(b) fixing scales of wages and enforcement of labour contracts—might be concurrently exercised.

Even in the Regulation of Servants and Apprentices Act 1746 (20 Geo. 2. c. 19), an act for settlement of disputes and differences as to wages or other conditions under a contract of labour, power was retained for the justices, on complaint of the masters of misdemeanour or ill-behaviour on the part of the servant, to discharge the latter from service or to send him to a house of correction "there to be corrected," that is, to be held to hard labour for a term not exceeding a month or to be corrected by whipping. In the Master and Servant Act 1823 (4 Geo. 4. c. 34), with a rather wider scope, the power to order corporal punishment, and in 1867 to hard labour, for breach of labour contracts had disappeared, and soon after the middle of the 19th century the right to enforce contracts of labour also disappeared. Then breach of such labour contracts became simply a question of recovery of damages, unless both parties agreed that security for the performance of the contract shall be given instead of damages.

=== Child labour ===
While the endeavour to enforce labour apart from a contract died out in the latter end of the 18th century, sentiment for some time had strongly grown in favour of developing early industrial training of children. It appears to have been a special object of charitable and philanthropic endeavour in the 17th century, as well as the 18th, to found houses of industry, in which little children, even under five years of age, might be trained for an apprenticeship with employers. Connected as this development was with poor relief, one of its chief aims was to prevent future unemployment and vagrancy by training inhabits and knowledge of the industry, but not unavowed was another motive: "from children thus trained up to constant labour we may venture to hope the lowering of its price." The evils and excesses which lay enfolded within such a movement gave the first impulse to the new ventures in labour legislation which are especially the work of the 19th century. Evident as it is "that before the Industrial Revolution very young children were largely employed both in their own homes and as apprentices under the Poor Law," and that "long before Peel's time there were misgivings about the apprenticeship system," still it needed the concentration and prominence of suffering and injury to child life in the factory system to lead to parliamentary intervention.

- Combination Act 1799 (39 Geo. 3. c. 81)

== Early 19th century ==
=== Health and safety laws ===
A serious outbreak of fever in 1784 in cotton mills near Manchester appears to have first drawn widespread and influential public opinion to the overwork of children, under terribly dangerous and insanitary conditions, on which the factory system was then largely being carried on. A local inquiry, chiefly by a group of medical men presided over by Dr Thomas Percival, was instituted by the justices of the peace for Lancashire, and in the forefront of the resulting report stood a recommendation for limitation and control of the working hours of the children. A resolution by the county justices followed, in which they declared their intention in future to refuse

"indentures of parish Apprentices whereby they shall be bound to Owners of Cotton Mills and other works in which children are obliged to work in the night or more than ten hours in the day."

In 1795 the Manchester Board of Health was formed, which, with fuller information, more definitely advised legislation for the regulation of the hours and conditions of labour in factories. The Health and Morals of Apprentices Act 1802 (42 Geo. 3. c. 73) was passed, which in effect formed the first step towards prevention of injury to and protection of labour in factories. It was directly aimed only at evils of the apprentice system, under which large numbers of pauper children were worked in cotton and woollen mills without education, for excessive hours, under wretched conditions. It did not apply to places employing fewer than twenty persons or three apprentices, and it applied the principle of limitation of hours (to twelve a day) and abolition of night work, as well as educational requirements, only to apprentices. Religious teaching and suitable sleeping accommodation and clothing were provided for in the act, also as regards apprentices. Lime-washing and ventilation provisions applied to all cotton and woollen factories employing more than twenty persons. "Visitors" were to be appointed by county justices for repression of contraventions, and were empowered to:

"direct the adoption of such sanitary regulations as they might on advice think proper."

The mills were to be registered by the clerk of the peace, and justices had power to inflict fines of from £2 to for contraventions. Although enforcement of the very limited provisions of the act was in many cases poor or non-existent, in some districts excellent work was done by justices, and in 1803 the West Riding of Yorkshire justices passed a resolution substituting the ten hours' limit for the twelve hours' limit of the act, as a condition of permission for indenturing of apprentices in mills.

Rapid development of the application of steam power to manufacture led to growth of employment of children in populous centres, otherwise than on the apprenticeship system, and before long the evils attendant on this change brought the general question of regulation and protection of child labour in textile factories to the front. The Cotton Mills and Factories Act 1819 (59 Geo. 3. c. 66), limited as it was, was a noteworthy step forward, in that it dealt with this wider scope of employment of children in cotton factories, and it is satisfactory to record that it was the outcome of the efforts and practical experiments of a great manufacturer, Robert Owen. Its provisions fell on every point lower than the aims he put forward on his own experience as practicable, and notably in its application only to cotton mills instead of all textile factories. Prohibition of child labour under nine years of age and limitation of the working day to twelve in each twenty-four (without specifying the precise hour of beginning and closing) were the main provisions of this act. No provision was made for enforcement of the law beyond such as was attempted in the Health and Morals of Apprentices Act 1802.

Slight amendments were attempted in the Cotton Mills Regulation Act 1825 and the Labour in Cotton Mills Act 1831, but the first really important Factory Act was the Labour of Children, etc., in Factories Act 1833 (3 & 4 Will. 4. c. 103) applying to textile factories generally, limiting employment of young persons under eighteen years of age, as well as children, prohibiting night work between 8:30 p.m. and 5:30 a.m., and first providing for "inspectors" to enforce the law. This is the act which was based on the devoted efforts of Michael Sadler, with whose name in this connexion that of Lord Ashley, afterwards Earl of Shaftesbury, was from 1832 associated. The importance of this act lay in its provision for skilled inspection and thus for enforcement of the law by an independent body of men unconnected with the locality in which the manufactures lay, whose specialisation in their work enabled them to acquire information needed for further development of legislation for protection of labour. Their powers were to a certain extent judicial, being assimilated to those possessed by justices; they could administer oaths and make such "rules, regulations and orders" as were necessary for execution of the act, and could hear complaints and impose penalties under the act.

The Factory Act 1844 (7 & 8 Vict. c. 15) modified these extensive inspectoral powers, organizing the service on lines resembling those of our own time, and added provision for certifying surgeons to examine workers under sixteen years of age as to physical fitness for employment and to grant certificates of age and ordinary strength. Hours of labour, by the Labour of Children, etc., in Factories Act 1833, were limited for children under the age of eleven to nine each day, or 48 in the week, and for young persons under eighteen to 12 a day or 69 in the week. Between 1833 and 1844 the movement in favour of a ten hours' day, which had long been in progress, reached its height in a time of great commercial and industrial distress, but could not be carried into effect until 1847. By the Factory Act 1844 the hours of adult women were first regulated, and were limited (as were already those of "young persons") to 12 a day; children were permitted either to work the same hours on alternate days or "half-time," with compulsory school attendance as a condition of their employment. The aim, in thus adjusting the hours of the three classes of workers, was to provide for a practical standard working-day. For the first time, detailed provisions for health and safety began to make their appearance in the law. Penal compensation for preventable injuries due to unfenced machinery was also provided, and appears to have been the outcome of a discussion by witnesses before the Royal Commission on Labour of Young Persons in Mines and Manufactures in 1841.

From this date, 1841, begin the first attempts at protective legislation for labour in mining. The Mines and Collieries Act 1842 (5 & 6 Vict. c. 99), following the terrible revelations of the royal commission referred to excluded women and girls from underground working, and limited the employment of boys, excluding from underground working those under ten years, but it was not until 1850 that systematic reporting of fatal accidents and until 1855 that other safeguards for health, life and limb in mines were seriously provided by law. With the exception of regulations against truck there was no protection for the miner before 1842; before 1814 it was not customary to hold inquests on miners killed by accidents in mines. From 1842 onwards considerable interaction in the development of the two sets of acts (mines and factories), as regards special protection against industrial injury to health and limb, took place, both in Parliament and in the department (the Home Office) administering them.

Another strong influence tending towards ultimate development of scientific protection of health and life in industry began in the work and reports of the series of sanitary commissions and Board of Health reports from 1843 onwards. In 1844 the mines inspector made his first report, but two years later women were still employed to some extent underground. Organised inspection began in 1850, and in 1854 the Select Committee on Accidents adopted a suggestion of the inspectors for legislative extension of the practice of several colliery owners in framing special safety rules for working in mines.

The Coal Mines Act 1855 provided seven general rules, relating to ventilation, fencing of disused shafts, proper means for signalling, proper gauges and valve for steam-boiler, indicators and brakes for machine lowering and raising; also it provided that detailed special rules submitted by mine-owners to the secretary of state, might, on his approval, have the force of law and be enforceable by penalty.

The Mines Regulation Act 1860 (23 & 24 Vict. c. 151), besides extending the law to ironstone mines, following as it did on a series of disastrous accidents and explosions, strengthened some of the provisions for safety. At several inquests, strong evidence was given of incompetent management and neglect of rules, and a demand was made for enforcing employment only of certificated managers of coal mines. This was not met until the Coal Mines Regulation Act 1872, but in 1860 certain sections relating to wages and education were introduced. The steady development of the coal industry, increasing association among miners, and increased scientific knowledge of means of ventilation and of other methods for securing safety, all paved the way to the Coal Mines Regulation Act 1872, and in the same year health and safety in metalliferous mines received their first legislative treatment in a code of similar scope and character to that of the Coal Mines Act 1855 via the Metalliferrous Mines Regulation Act 1872 (35 & 36 Vict. c. 77). This act was amended by the Coal Mines Act 1886, and repealed and recodified by the Coal Mines Regulation Act 1887 (50 & 51 Vict. c. 58); its principal provisions are still in force, with certain revised special rules and modifications as regards reporting of accidents (Notice of Accidents Act 1906) and employment of children (Coal Mines Regulation Act (1887) Amendment Act 1903). It was based on the recommendations of a royal commission, which had reported in 1864, and which had shown the grave excess of mortality and sickness among metalliferous miners, attributed to the inhalation of gritty particles, imperfect ventilation, great changes of temperature, excessive physical exertion, exposure to wet, and other causes. The prohibition of employment of women and of boys under ten years underground in this class of mines, as well as in coal mines, had been effected by the Mines and Collieries Act 1842, and inspection had been provided for in the Mines Regulation Act 1860; these were in amended form included in the code of the Coal Mines Regulation Act 1872, the age of employment of boys underground being raised to twelve.

In the Coal Mines Regulation Act 1872 we see the first important effort to provide a complete code of regulation for the special dangers to health, life and limb in coal mines apart from other mines; it applied to

"mines of coal, mines of stratified ironstone, mines of shale and mines of fire-clay."

Unlike the companion act—applying to all other mines—it maintained the age limit of entering underground employment for boys at ten years, but for those between ten and twelve it provided for a system of working analogous to the half-time system in factories, including compulsory school attendance. The limits of employment for boys from twelve to sixteen were 10 hours in any one day and 54 in any one week. The chief characteristics of the act lay in extension of [the "general" safety rules, improvement of the method of formulating "special" safety rules, provision for certificated and competent management, and increased inspection. Several important matters were transferred from the special to the general rules, such as compulsory use of safety lamps where needed, regulation of use of explosives, and securing of roofs and sides. Special rules, before being submitted to the secretary of state for approval, must be posted in the mine for two weeks, with a notice that objections might be sent by any person employed to the district inspector. Wilful neglect of safety provisions became punishable in the case of employers as well as miners by imprisonment with hard labour. But the most important new step lay in the sections relating to daily control and supervision of every mine by a manager holding a certificate of competency from the secretary of state, after examination by a board of examiners appointed by the secretary of state, power being retained for him to cause later inquiry into competency of the holder of the certificate, and to cancel or suspend the certificate in case of proved unfitness.

Returning to the development of factory and workshop law from the year, 1844, the main line of effort—after the Factories Act 1847 (10 & 11 Vict. c. 29) had restricted hours of women and young persons to 10 a day and fixed the daily limits between 6 a.m. and 6 p.m. (Saturday 6 a.m. to 2 p.m.)—lay in bringing trade after trade in some degree under the scope of this branch of law, which had hitherto only regulated conditions in textile factories. Bleaching and dyeing works were included by the Bleaching and Dyeing Works Act 1860 (23 & 24 Vict. c. 78) and the Bleaching Works Act 1862, lace factories by the Lace Factory Act 1861 (24 & 25 Vict. c. 117); calendering and finishing by the Bleaching and Dyeing Works Act Amendment Act 1863 (26 & 27 Vict. c. 38) and the Bleaching and Dyeing Works Act Extension Act 1864 (27 & 28 Vict. c. 98); bakehouses became partially regulated by the Bakehouse Regulation Act 1863 (26 & 27 Vict. c. 40), with special reference to local authorities for administration of its clauses. The report of the third Children's Employment Commission brought together in accessible form the miserable facts relating to child labour in a number of unregulated industries in the year 1862, and the Factory Acts Extension Act 1864 (27 & 28 Vict. c. 48) brought some of (these earthenware-making, lucifer match-making, percussion cap and cartridge making, paper-staining, and fustian cutting) partly under the scope of the various textile Factory Acts in force. A larger addition of trades was made three years later, but the Factory Acts Extension Act 1864 is particularly interesting in that it first embodied some of the results of inquiries of expert medical and sanitary commissioners, by requiring ventilation to be applied to the removal of injurious gases, dust, and other impurities generated in manufacture, and made a first attempt to engraft part of the special rules system from the mines acts. The provisions for framing such rules disappeared in the Factory and Workshop Act 1878 (41 & 42 Vict. c. 16) to be revived in a better form later.

== Late 19th century ==
Throughout the 19th century, workers' living and working conditions remained poor, and life expectancy was comparatively short.

As industrial Britannia was extending its Empire, its corporations and its businesses were responsible for half the world's production across a third of the globe's land, a quarter of its population and ruling its waves. Joint stock companies, building railways, canals and factories, manufacturing household goods, connecting telegraphs, distributing coal, formed the backbone of this dominant laissez faire model of commerce. Around the start of the 20th century, in Mogul Steamship Co Ltd v McGregor, Gow & Co, the House of Lords emphasised that businesses should be free to organise into trade associations in the same way that employees organised into unions. The consciousness of working people that they should have a role in the economy mirrored the development toward political participation.

- Friedrich Engels, The Condition of the Working Class in England in 1844 (1845)
- Sir Henry James Sumner Maine, Ancient Law (1864) and the move from status to contract
- Karl Marx, Das Kapital (1867)
- Workmen's Compensation Act 1897 (60 & 61 Vict. c. 37)
- Beatrice Webb and Sidney Webb, History of Trade Unionism (1894) and Industrial Democracy (1897)

=== Trade union decriminalisation ===
- Reform Act 1867 (30 & 31 Vict. c. 102)
- Master and Servant Act 1867 (30 & 31 Vict. c. 141)
- Report of the Royal Commission on Trade Unions (1868–1869) Parliamentary Papers vol xxxi
- Trades Union Congress (est. 1868)
- Trade Union Act 1871 (34 & 35 Vict. c. 31)
- Criminal Law Amendment Act 1871 (34 & 35 Vict. c. 32)
- Cockburn Commission
- Conspiracy, and Protection of Property Act 1875 (38 & 39 Vict. c. 86)
- Employers and Workmen Act 1875 (38 & 39 Vict. c. 90)

=== Health and safety post 1867 ===
The Sanitary Act 1866, administered by local authorities, provided for general sanitation in any factories and workshops not under existing factory acts, and the Workshops Regulation Act 1867, similarly to be administered by local authorities, amended in 1870, practically completed the application of the main principle of the factory acts to all places in which manual labour was exercised for gain in the making or finishing of articles or parts of articles for sale. A few specially dangerous or injurious trades brought under regulation in 1864 and 1867 (e.g. earthenware and lucifer match making, glass-making) ranked as "factories," although not using mechanical power, and for a time employment of less than fifty persons relegated certain work-places to the category of "workshops," but broadly the presence or absence of such motor power in aid of process was made and has remained the distinction between factories and workshops.

The Factory Act 1874, the last of the series before the consolidation of the Factory and Workshop Act 1878 (41 & 42 Vict. c. 16), raised the minimum age of employment for children to ten years in textile factories. In most of the great inquiries into conditions of child labour the fact has come clearly to light, in regard to textile and non-textile trades alike, that parents as much as any employers have been responsible for too early employment and excessive hours of employment of children, and from early times until to-day in factory legislation it has been recognised that they must to some extent be held responsible for due observation of the limits imposed. For example, in 1831 it was found necessary to protect occupiers against parental responsibility for false certificates of age, and in 1833 parents of a child or

"any Person having any benefit from the wages of such child"

were made to share responsibility for employment of children without school attendance or beyond legal hours.

During the discussions on the bill which became law in 1874, it had become apparent that revision and consolidation of the multiplicity of statutes then regulating manufacturing industry had become pressingly necessary; modifications and exceptions for exceptional conditions in separate industries needed reconsideration and systematisation on clear principles, and the main requirements of the law could with great advantage be applied more generally to all the industries. In particular, the daily limits as to period of employment, pauses for meals, and holidays, needed to be unified for non-textile factories and workshops, so as to bring about a standard working-day, and thus prevent the tendency in

"the larger establishments to farm out work among the smaller, where it is done under less favourable conditions both sanitary and educational."

In these main directions, and that of simplifying definitions, summarising special sanitary provisions that had been gradually introduced for various trades, and centralising and improving the organisation of the inspectorate, the Commission of 1876 on the Factory Acts made its recommendations, and the Factory and Workshop Act 1878 took effect. In the fixed working-day, provisions for pauses, holidays, general and special exceptions, distinctions between systems of employment for children, young persons and women, education of children and certificates of fitness for children and young persons, limited regulation of domestic workshops, general principles of administration and definitions, the Factory and Workshop Act 1878 was made practically the same as that embodied in the later principal Factory and Workshop Act 1901. More or less completely revised were:

(a) the sections in the Factory and Workshop Act 1878 relating to mode of controlling sanitary conditions in workshops (since 1891 primarily enforced by the local sanitary authority);
(b) provision for reporting accidents and for enforcing safety (other than fencing of mill gearing and dangerous machinery);
(c) detailed regulation of injurious and dangerous process and trades;
(d) powers of certifying surgeons;
(e) amount of overtime permissible (greatly reduced in amount and now confined to adults);
(f) age for permissible employment of a child has been raised from ten years to twelve years.

Entirely new since the Factory and Workshop Act 1878 are the provisions:

(a) for control of outwork;
(b) for supplying particulars of work and wages to piece-workers, enabling them to compute the total amount of wages payable to them;
(e) extension of the act to laundries;
(f) a tentative effort to limit the too early employment of mothers after childbirth.

The Factory and Workshop Act 1878 remained until the Factory and Workshop Act 1901 (1 Edw. 7. c. 22), although much had been meanwhile superimposed, a monument to the efforts of the great factory reformers of the first half of the 19th century, and the general groundwork of safety for workers in factories and workshops in the main divisions of sanitation, security against accidents, physical fitness of workers, general limitation of hours and times of employment for young workers and women. The Factory and Workshop Act 1901, which came into force 1 January 1902 (and became the principal act), was an amending as well as a consolidating act. Comparison of the two acts shows, however, that, in spite of the advantages of further consolidation and helpful changes in arrangement of sections and important additions which tend towards a specialised hygiene for factory life, the fundamental features of the law as fought out in the 19th century remain undisturbed. So far as the law has altered in character, it has done so chiefly by gradual development of certain sanitary features, originally subordinate, and by strengthening provision for security against accidents and not by retreat from its earlier aims. At the same time a basis for possible new developments can be seen in the protection of "outworkers" as well as factory workers against fraudulent or defective particulars of piece-work rates of wages.

Later acts directly and indirectly affecting the law are certain acts of 1903, 1906, 1907, to be touched on presently.

The Factory and Workshop Act 1878, in a series of acts from 1883 to 1895, received striking additions, based

1. on the experience gained in other branches of protective legislation, e.g. development of the method of regulation of dangerous trades by "special rules" and administrative inquiry into accidents under Coal Mines Acts;
2. on the findings of royal commissions and parliamentary inquiries, e.g. increased control of "outwork" and domestic workshops, and limitation of "overtime";
3. on the development of administrative machinery for enforcing the more modern law relating to public health, e.g. transference of administration of sanitary provisions in workshops to the local sanitary authorities;
4. on the trade union demand for means for securing trustworthy records of wage-contracts between employer and workman, e.g. the section requiring particulars of work and wages for piece-workers.

The first additions to the Factory and Workshop Act 1878 were, however, almost purely attempts to deal more adequately than had been attempted in the code of 1878 with certain striking instances of trades injurious to health. Thus the Factory and Workshop Act 1883 provided that white-lead factories should not be carried on without a certificate of conformity with certain conditions, and also made provision for special rules, on lines later superseded by those laid down in the Factory and Workshop Act 1891, applicable to any employment in a factory or workshop certified as dangerous or injurious by the secretary of state.

The Factory and Workshop Act 1883 also dealt with sanitary conditions in bake houses. Certain definitions and explanations of previous enactments touching overtime and employment of a child in any factory or workshop were also included in the act. A class of factories in which excessive heat and humidity seriously affected the health of operatives was next dealt with in the Cotton Cloth Factories Act 1889. This provided for special notice to the chief inspector from all occupiers of cotton cloth factories (i.e. any room, shed, or workshop or part thereof in which weaving of cotton cloth is carried on) who intend to produce humidity by artificial means; regulated both temperature of workrooms and amount of moisture in the atmosphere, and provided for tests and records of the same; and fixed a standard minimum volume of fresh air (600 cu ft or 17 m^{3}) to be admitted in every hour for every person employed in the factory. Power was retained for the secretary of state to modify by order the standard for the maximum limit of humidity of the atmosphere at any given temperature. The Factory and Workshop Act 1870 (33 & 34 Vict. c. 62) extended this power to other measures for the protection of health.

The special measures from 1878 to 1889 gave valuable precedents for further developments of special hygiene in factory life, but the next advance in the Factory and Workshop Act 1891, following the House of Lords Committee on the sweating system and the Berlin International Labour Conference, extended over much wider ground. Its principal objects were:

(a) to render administration of the law relating to workshops more efficient, particularly as regards sanitation; with this end in view it made the primary controlling authority for sanitary matters in workshops the local sanitary authority (now the district council), acting by their officers, and giving them the powers of the less numerous body of factory inspectors, while at the same time the provisions of the Public Health Acts replaced in workshops the very similar sanitary provisions of the Factory Acts;
(b) to provide for greater security against accidents and more efficient fencing of machinery in factories;
(c) to extend the method of regulation of unhealthy or dangerous occupations by application of special rules and requirements to any incident of employment (other than in a domestic workshop) certified by the secretary of state to be dangerous or injurious to health or dangerous to life or limb;
(d) to raise the age of employment of children and restrict the employment of women immediately after childbirth;
(e) to require particulars of rate of wages to be given with work to piece-workers in certain branches of the textile industries;
(f) to amend the Factory and Workshop Act 1878 in various subsidiary ways, with the view of improving the administration of its principles, e.g. by increasing the means of checking the amount of overtime worked, empowering inspectors to enter work-places used as dwellings without a justice's warrant, and the imposition of minimum penalties in certain cases. On this act followed four years of greatly accelerated administrative activity. No fewer than sixteen trades were scheduled by the secretary of state as dangerous to health. The manner of preparing and establishing suitable rules was greatly modified by the Factory and Workshop Act 1901 (1 Edw. 7. c. 22) and will be dealt with in that connexion.

The Factory and Workshop Act 1895 followed thus on a period of exercise of new powers of administrative regulation (the period being also that during which the Royal Commission on Labour made its wide survey of industrial conditions), and after two successive annual reports of the chief inspector of factories had embodied reports and recommendations from the women inspectors, who in 1893 were first added to the inspectorate. Again, the chief features of an even wider legislative effort than that of 1891 were the increased stringency and definiteness of the measures for securing hygienic and safe conditions of work. Some of these measures, however, involved new principles, as in the provision for the prohibition of the use of a dangerous machine or structure by the order of a magistrates' court, and the power to include in the special rules drawn up in pursuance of section 8 of the Factory and Workshop Act 1891, the prohibition of the employment of any class of persons, or the limitation of the period of employment of any class of persons in any process scheduled by order of the secretary of state. These last two powers have both been exercised, and with the exercise of the latter died, without opposition, the absolute freedom of the employer of the adult male labourer to carry on his manufacture without legislative limitation of the hours of labour. Second only in significance to these new developments was the addition, for the first time since 1867, of new classes of workplaces not covered by the general definitions in section 93 of the Factory and Workshop Act 1878, viz.

(a) laundries (with special conditions as to hours, etc.);
(b) docks, wharves, quays, warehouses and premises on which machinery worked by power is temporarily used for the purpose of the construction of a building or any structural work in connection with the building (for the purpose only of obtaining security against accidents).

Other entirely new provisions in the Factory and Workshop Act 1895, later strengthened by the Factory and Workshop Act 1901, were the requirement of a reasonable temperature in workrooms, the requirement of lavatories for the use of persons employed in any department where poisonous substances are used, the obligation on occupiers and medical practitioners to report cases of industrial poisoning; and the penalties imposed on an employer wilfully allowing wearing apparel to be made, cleaned or repaired in a dwelling-house where an inmate is suffering from infectious disease. Another provision empowered the secretary of state to specify classes of outwork and areas with a view to the regulation of the sanitary condition of premises in which outworkers are employed. Owing to the conditions attached to its exercise, no case was found in which this power could come into operation, and the Factory and Workshop Act 1901 deals with the matter on new lines.

The requirement of annual returns from occupiers of persons employed, and the competency of the person charged with infringing the act to give evidence in his defence, were important new provisions, as was also the adoption of the powers to direct a formal investigation of any accident on the lines laid down in section 45 of the Coal Mines Regulation Act 1887. Other sections, relating to sanitation and safety, were developments of previous regulations, e.g. the fixing of a standard of overcrowding, provision of sanitary accommodation separate for each sex where the standard of the Public Health Act Amendment Act 1890 had not been adopted by the competent local sanitary authority, power to order a fan or other mechanical means to carry off injurious gas, vapour or other impurity (the previous power covering only dust). The fencing of machinery and definition of accidents were made more precise, young persons were prohibited from cleaning dangerous machinery, and additional safeguards against risk of injury by fire or panic were introduced. On the question of employment the foremost amendments lay in the almost complete prohibition of overtime for young persons, and the restriction of the power of an employer to employ protected persons outside his factory or workshop on the same day that he had employed them in the factory or workshop. Under the head of particulars of work and wages to piece-workers an important new power, highly valued by the workers, was given to apply the principle with the necessary modifications by order of the secretary of state to industries other than textile and to outworkers as well as to those employed inside factories and workshops.

In 1899 an indirect modification of the limitation to employment of children was effected by the Elementary Education Amendment Act 1899, which, by raising from eleven to twelve the minimum age at which a child may, by the by-laws of a local authority, obtain total or partial exemption from the obligation to attend school, made it unlawful for an occupier to take into employment any child under twelve in such a manner as to prevent full-time attendance at school. The age of employment became generally thereby the same as it has been for employment at a mine above ground since 1887. The Factory and Workshop Act 1901 made the prohibition of employment of a child under twelve in a factory or workshop direct and absolute. Under the divisions of sanitation, safety, fitness for employment, special regulation of dangerous trades, special control of bake houses, exceptional treatment of creameries, new methods of dealing with home work and outworkers, important additions were made to the general law by the Factory and Workshop Act 1901, as also in regulations for strengthened administrative control. New general sanitary provisions were those prescribing,

(a) ventilation per se for every workroom, and empowering the secretary of state to fix a standard of sufficient ventilation;
(b) drainage of wet floors;
(c) the power of the secretary of state to define in certain cases what shall constitute sufficient and suitable sanitary accommodation.

New safety provisions were those relating to:

(a) Examination and report on steam boilers;
(b) prohibition of employment of a child in cleaning below machinery in motion;
(c) power of the district council to make by-laws for escape in case of fire.

The most important administrative alterations were,

(a) a justice engaged in the same trade as, or being officer of an association of persons engaged in the same trade as, a person charged with an offence may not act at the hearing and determination of the charge;
(b) ordinary supervision of sanitary conditions under which outwork is carried on was transferred to the district council, power being reserved to the Home Office to intervene in case of neglect or default by any district council.

The Employment of Children Act 1903, while primarily providing for industries outside the scope of the Factory Act, incidentally secured that children employed as half Acts of timers should not also be employed in other occupations. The Notice of Accidents Act 1906 amended the whole system of notification of accidents, simultaneously in mines, quarries, factories and workshops, and will be set out in following paragraphs. The Factory and Workshop Act 1907 amended the law in respect of laundries by generally applying the provisions of the Factory and Workshop Act 1901 to trade laundries while granting them choice of new exceptional periods, and by extending the provisions of the act (with certain powers to the Home Office by Orders laid before parliament to allow variations) to institution laundries carried on for charitable or reformatory purposes. The Employment of Women Act 1907 repealed an exemption in the Factory and Workshop Act 1901 (and earlier acts) relating to employment of women in flax scutch mills, thus bringing this employment under the ordinary provisions as to period of employment.

- Factory and Workshop Act 1901 (1 Edw. 7. c. 22)
- United Kingdom mines and quarries regulation in 1910
- Shops Act 1911 (1 & 2 Geo. 5. c. 54)

== Liberal reforms from 1906 ==
In 1901 the judgment of Taff Vale Railway Co v Amalgamated Society of Railway Servants, made trade unions liable in economic tort for the costs of industrial action. Although a combination of employers in a company could dismiss employees without notice, a combination of employees in a trade union could not, by withdrawing their labour, do the same without sanction. This was soon reversed by an increasingly representative Parliament after the 1906 United Kingdom general election. The Liberal government and the Liberals, among whom David Lloyd George and Winston Churchill were rising stars, quickly passed the Trade Disputes Act 1906 with the additional support of the Labour Party. This laid down the principle of collective labour law that any strike "in contemplation or furtherance of a trade dispute" is immune from discriminatory civil law sanctions. The Old Age Pensions Act 1908 provided some security for people who retired, the Trade Boards Act 1909 created industrial panels that fixed minimum wages and the National Insurance Act 1911 levied a fee to insure people got benefits in the event of unemployment.

== Interwar period ==
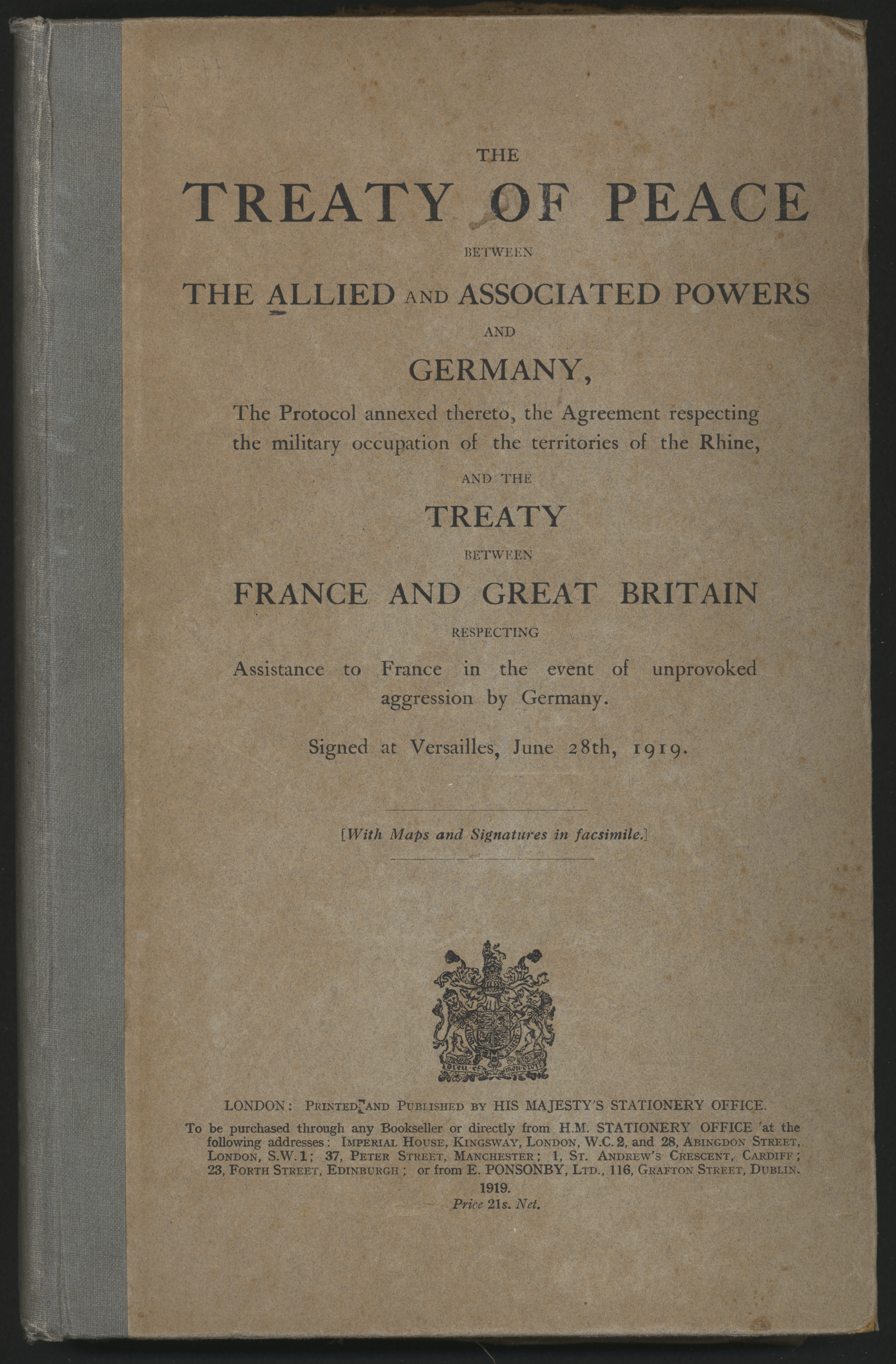
The Versailles Treaty.

During World War I the sheer brutality of the Western Front demanded the participation of every available person and resource. Women particularly took over traditional "men's jobs", as the Suffragette movement gained momentum. Before the war's conclusion, the Representation of the People Act 1918 gave universal suffrage to men over age 21 and women over 28. A new beginning was promised by the victors to their people. The Versailles Treaty created the International Labour Organization to draw up common standards between countries, for as it said, "peace can be established only if it is based on social justice", and echoed the US Clayton Act 1914 in pronouncing that "labour should not be regarded merely as a commodity or an article of commerce". But the international system remained disjointed as the United States Congress withheld its approval to join the League of Nations. Within the UK the postwar settlement was to make a home fit for heroes. Whitley Councils extended the Trade Boards Act 1909 system to Joint Industrial Councils that encouraged (non-legally binding) fair wage agreements, while the Ministry of Labour actively organised and advised the growth of trade unions. This was based on a theory of industrial democracy through collective bargaining, agreement or action, advocated by Sidney Webb and Beatrice Webb in Industrial Democracy to remedy the inequality of bargaining power of workers. Without legal force behind collective agreements, the law remained in a state of collective laissez faire, encouraging voluntarism for agreement and dispute settlement between industrial partners. The 1920s and 1930s were economically volatile. In 1926 a General Strike against coal miners' pay cuts paralysed the country, though was broken by Winston Churchill, by then the Chancellor of the Exchequer. The Trade Disputes and Trade Unions Act 1927 was subsequently passed to prohibit any secondary action. The Labour Party had formed parliamentary majorities in 1924 and 1929, but achieved little in the way of reform, particularly after the onset of the Great Depression.

- New Ministries and Secretaries Act 1916 (6 & 7 Geo. 5. c. 68), which created the Ministry of Labour
- Trade Disputes and Trade Unions Act 1927 (17 & 18 Geo. 5. c. 22)
- Trade Boards and Road Haulage Wages (Emergency Provisions) Act 1940 (3 & 4 Geo. 6. c. 7)
- Truck Act 1940 (3 & 4 Geo. 6. c. 38)
- Workmen's Compensation (Supplementary Allowances) Act 1940 (3 & 4 Geo. 6. c. 47)
- Workmen's Compensation and Benefit (Byssinosis) Act 1940 (3 & 4 Geo. 6. c. 56)

== Post-war consensus ==
By the Second World War and the Labour government of Clement Attlee, trade union membership was well established and collective agreements covered over 80 per cent of the workforce. With the British Empire in rapid dissolution and immigration from Commonwealth countries, combined with record levels of female workplace participation, the character of Britain's workforce was changing fast. Though the common law was sometimes comparatively progressive, sometimes not, the first statutes to prohibit discrimination focused on gender and race emerged in the 1960s as the Civil Rights Act was passed in the United States. Discrimination in employment (as in consumer or public service access) was formally prohibited on grounds of race in 1965, gender in 1975, disability in 1995, sexual orientation and religion in 2003 and age in 2006.

A complicated and inconsistent variety of acts and statutory instruments was placed into a comprehensive code in the Equality Act 2010 (c. 15). Much discrimination law is now applicable throughout the European Union, to which the UK acceded in 1972. While the prominence of labour issues in the early European Treaties and case law was scant, it was not until the Social Chapter of the Maastricht Treaty was drafted that labour issues were formally incorporated into the EU's jurisprudence.

- Wages Councils Act 1945 (8 & 9 Geo. 6. c. 17)
- Trade Disputes and Trade Unions Act 1946 (9 & 10 Geo. 6. c. 52)
- Control of Engagement Order 1947 (SR&O 1947/2021)
- Wages Councils Act 1948 (12, 13 & 14 Geo. 6. c. 7)
- Employment and Training Act 1948 (11 & 12 Geo. 6. c. 46), employment service
- Reinstatement in Civil Employment Act 1950 (14 & 15 Geo. 6. c. 10)
- Workmen's Compensation (Supplementation) Act 1951 (14 & 15 Geo. 6. c. 22)
- Industrial and Provident Societies Act 1952 (15 & 16 Geo. 6 & 1 Eliz. 2. c. 17)
- Terms and Conditions of Employment Act 1959 (7 & 8 Eliz. 2. c. 26)
- Wages Councils Act 1959 (7 & 8 Eliz. 2. c. 69)

== Conservative government ==
From 1979, the UK's Conservative government took a strongly sceptical policy to all forms of labour law and regulation. It opted out of the Social Chapter. This approach mirrored the policy trend of the 1980s, where ten major acts reduced the power of trade unions. Reforms to the internal structure of unions mandated that representatives be elected and a ballot is taken before a strike, that no worker could strike in sympathetic secondary action with workers with a different employer, and that employers could not run a closed shop system of requiring all workers to join the recognised union.

== New Labour ==
In 1997 the new Labour government brought the UK into the EU's Social Chapter, which has served as the source for most reform in UK law since that time. The National Minimum Wage Act 1998 established a country-wide minimum wage, but did not attempt to reinvigorate the Wage Board system. The Employment Relations Act 1999 introduced a 60-page procedure requiring employers to compulsorily recognise and bargain with a union, though union membership remained at a steady 30 per cent level. While the UK retains essentially the same legal framework as evolved through the 1980s, globalisation, Europeanisation and increased success in workplace participation models ensure further change will follow.

== Cameron, Coalition and May administrations ==
Following the election of David Cameron and the formation of the Conservative—Liberal Democrat coalition, the Equality Act 2010 passed into law which unified anti-discrimination laws including the Disability Discrimination Act 1995, the Equal Pay Act 1970, the Sex Discrimination Act 1975 and the Race Relations Act 1976 to provide a unified approach to anti-discrimination protections in the workplace covering sex, race, ethnicity, sexual orientation, disability and a number of other factors.

In April 2012, the qualifying service required by employees in order to claim for unfair dismissal at an employee tribunal was doubled from 12 months to 2 years. Introduced in response to the government's "austerity" measures, and civil service cut-backs, it was said to be intended to reduce the number of claims. The consequence was that employers could recruit and dismiss according to their short-term business needs. It meant that the protections in place for employees against unfair dismissal were reduced and therefore job security was reduced.

The Coalition also implemented a number of measures from the Work and Families Act 2006 and the Pensions Act 2008. They also introduced the Agency Workers Regulations 2010.

Following the Conservative success at the 2015 general election, the government introduced the National Living Wage by amending the National Minimum Wage Act 1998.

In 2016, Theresa May commissioned Matthew Taylor to review whether UK employment law was suitable given the rise of the "gig economy", as well as the rise in atypical workers and those on zero-hours contracts. The review concluded in 2017 and made a number of recommendations that were then included in the Good Work Plan, specifically around introducing more rights for agency and contract workers.

In July 2017, in the case of R (UNISON) v Lord Chancellor, the Supreme Court of the United Kingdom ruled that the government's introduction (in 2013) of fees for people bringing cases to employment tribunals was unlawful. The fees were scrapped and fees paid by claimants refunded.

In 2017, the government also reformed took a step towards IR35 reform, requiring public sector organisations to ensure that contractors providing services through their own personal service company fell within the IR35 rules. This was later extended to the private sector.

== Brexit, COVID-19, Johnson, Truss and Sunak ==
Following the 2016 referendum on EU membership, there was considerable discussion concerning how the departure of the UK from the EU would affect employment rights, given the European origin of considerable amounts of employment-related legislation (including equality law and the Working Time Regulations 1998). Following the conclusion of the withdrawal agreement, EU legislation is retained in UK law through the European Union (Withdrawal) Act 2018, though they can be amended.

The COVID-19 pandemic led to a number of changes to employment law, specifically the introduction of the Coronavirus Job Retention Scheme and Self-Employment Income Support Scheme, as well as tax relief for those working at home.

In 2022, a considerable number of strikes and industrial disputes occurred, which prompted the government to introduce an anti-strike law, the Strikes (Minimum Service Levels) Act 2023. This was opposed by the Labour Party and by trade unions. It was repealed by the Employment Rights Act 2025.

Employment-related legislation passed during this period included the Carer's Leave Act 2023, the Neonatal Care (Leave and Pay) Act 2023, and the Protection from Redundancy (Pregnancy and Family Leave) Act 2023.

== Starmer and Burnham ==
In 2021, the Labour Party, under the leadership of Keir Starmer, published a green paper, the New Deal for Working People, promising strengthening of union rights, an end to 'fire and rehire', an end to exploitative zero-hours contracts, and more statutory rights from the first day of employment. Following the 2024 general election, the King's Speech included a commitment to introduce a new employment rights bill within 100 days. This was passed into law as the Employment Rights Act 2025, though not all of the provisions of it have been brought into force.

== See also ==
- History of labour law
- History of the welfare state in the United Kingdom

Late nineteenth century acts of Parliament

- Hosiery Manufacture (Wages) Act 1874
- Public Health Act 1875 (38 & 39 Vict. c. 55)
- Truck Act 1887
- Truck Act Amendment Act 1887
- Truck Act 1896
- Stratified Ironstone Mines (Gunpowder) Act 1881
- Coal Mines (Weighing of Minerals) Act 1905
- Notice of Accidents Act 1906
- Coal Mines Regulation Act 1908 (8 Edw. 7. c. 57)
