= Otto Kahn-Freund =

German academic

Sir Otto Kahn-Freund
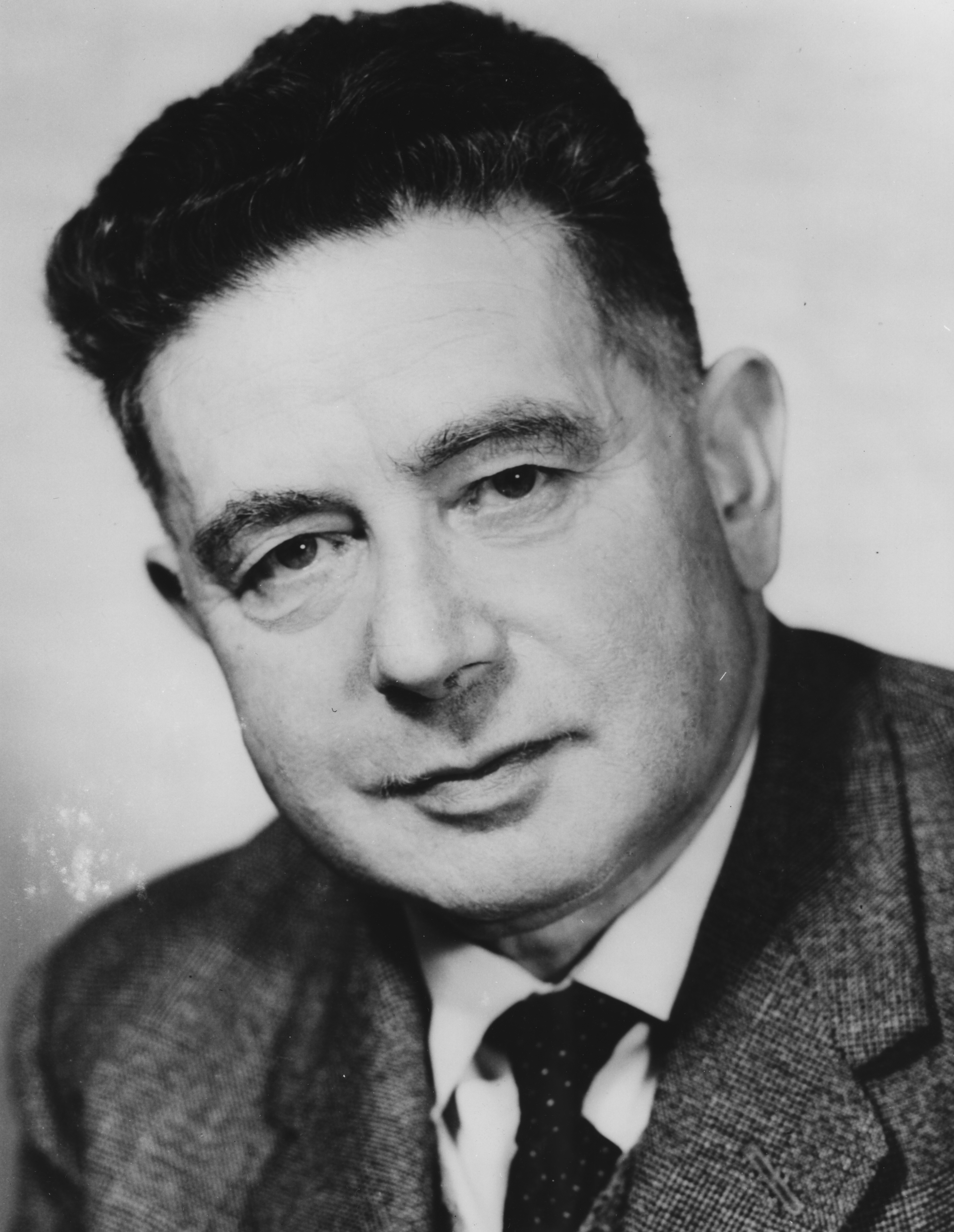
- Kahn-Freund in 1950
- Born: 17 November 1900; Frankfurt am Main, German Empire
- Died: 16 August 1979 (aged 78); Oxford, England, UK
- Citizenship: German
- Education: Goethe-Gymnasium, Frankfurt
- Alma mater: Frankfurt University; London School of Economics
- Occupations: Academic lawyer, judge
- Employer(s): London School of Economics; Brasenose College, Oxford

Sir Otto Kahn-Freund, QC (17 November 1900 – 16 August 1979) was a scholar of labour law and comparative law. He was a professor at the London School of Economics and the University of Oxford.

== Biography ==
Kahn-Freund was born in Frankfurt am Main the only child of Richard Kahn-Freund and his wife, Carrie Freund. Although an agnostic he had a strict and conventional Jewish upbringing, and was very proud of this. He was educated at the Goethe-Gymnasium, Frankfurt, and then studied law at the Frankfurt University.

== Career ==
=== Berlin ===
He became judge of the Berlin labour court, 1929. Kahn-Freund wrote a pathbreaking article, contending that the Reichsarbeitsgericht (Empire Labour Court) was pursuing a "fascist" doctrine in 1931. According to Kahn-Freund, fascism shared liberalism’s dislike of state intervention and preference for private ownership, social conservatism’s embrace of welfare provision for insiders, and collectivism’s view that associations are key actors in class conflict.

In the case law, Kahn-Freund presented, the Reichsarbeitsgericht had been systematically undermining collective rights in work councils, demanding that trade unionists owed a duty to the Betrieb (the workplace) which was indistinguishable from the employer. On the other hand, the court had demanded that individual workplace rights (for instance, to social insurance) were strongly protected. The article was shunned by the German Legal Academy and the trade unions at the time, but in retrospect has been seen as tragically accurate.

Kahn-Freund continued working as a judge until 1933, shortly after Hitler seized the chancellorship in coalition with the conservative DNVP. He found that radio workers were falsely accused of being communist and were entitled to maximum damages for unfair dismissal. He was then dismissed by the Nazis in 1933. He fled to London and became a student at the London School of Economics.

=== London ===
He became an assistant lecturer in law there in 1936 and professor in 1951. He was called to the bar (Middle Temple) in 1936. He became a British subject in 1940.

=== Oxford ===
He was appointed Professor of Comparative Law at the University of Oxford, and fellow of Brasenose College, Oxford in 1964 and elected FBA in 1965. He became an honorary bencher of the Middle Temple in 1969 and a QC in 1972. He was knighted in 1976.

He played an important part in the establishment of labour law as an independent area of legal study, and is credited as the doyen of British Labour Law.

He laid the groundwork of a philosophical approach toward Labour Law in British scholarship, which had hitherto been characterised by empiricism. In particular, his concept of "collective laissez-faire" was both a description of the British model of industrial relations in the 1960s and a normative model of how industrial relations should be. Industrial relations is conceived as tripartite, with Employers, Employees (through Trade Unions) and the State all engaged as actors. "The relation between an employer and an isolated employee or worker is typically a relation between a bearer of power and one who is not a bearer of power. In its inception it is an act of submission, in its operation it is a condition of subordination."

The concept of collective laissez-faire sets out the idea that the law (and the State) should be abstentionist, meaning that the state should allow capital and collective labour to negotiate freely, without extensive legislative interference, unless collective representation is unlikely to yield industrial justice or stability. Philosophically, this can be contrasted with the "market individualism" approach or the "floor-of rights" approach.

He was a member of the Royal Commission on Reform of Trade Unions and Employers' Associations 1965. This became known as the Donovan Commission, and reported in 1968. Kahn-Freund, as the senior lawyer on the commission, has been regarded as having substantially written the Donovan Report published in 1968, although credit for moving the Commission's views towards a 'laissez faire' attitude has been largely given to another member, Hugh Clegg. The Donovan Report's significance in British Labour Law is that it formed the intellectual underpinnings of both the Industrial Relations Act 1971 and the Trade Union and Labour Relations Act 1974.

Otto Kahn-Freund had a substantial and extensive influence on a generation of British labour lawyers, many of whom themselves passed on his influence in their own academic work, such as Bill Wedderburn, Paul L. Davies, Mark Freedland, Keith Ewing, Roy Lewis and Jon Clarke.

== Publications ==
- Das soziale Ideal des Reichsarbeitsgerichts (Bensheimer, Mannheim, Berlin, Leipzig 1931) translated as ‘The Social Ideal of the Reich Labour Court - A Critical Examination of the Practice of the Reich Labour Court’ (1931) in O Kahn-Freund, R Lewis and J Clark (eds), Labour Law and Politics in the Weimar Republic (Social Science Research Council 1981) ch 3, 108-111.
- The law of carriage by inland transport (Stevens, London 1939)
- Beiträge zum Neuaufbau des deutschen Arbeitsrechts (Renaissance Publ., Welwyn Garden City 1944)
- The Growth of Internationalism in English Private International Law (1960)
- Die Rechtsinstitute des Privatrechts und ihre soziale Funktion (Fischer, Stuttgart 1965) with Karl Renner, translation by Elisabeth Kahn-Freund
- Delictual Liability and the Conflict of Laws (1968)
- Parallelen und Gegensätze im englischen und amerikanischen Privatrecht (Hanstein, Bonn 1970) with Viktor Weidner
- General Problems of Private International Law (1975)
- Labour and the Law (Hamlyn Trust 1972) ISBN 978-0-420-43850-8, (2nd edn Stevens 1977) ISBN 0-420-45210-9
- Arbeit und Recht (Bund, Köln, Frankfurt am Main 1979) translation by Franz Mestitz.
- Kahn-Freund's Labour and the Law (3rd edn Stevens & Sons 1983) introduction by PL Davies and M Freedland
- Arbeitsbeziehungen (Nomos, Baden-Baden 1981)
