= Gladstonian liberalism =

British Victorian-era political doctrine

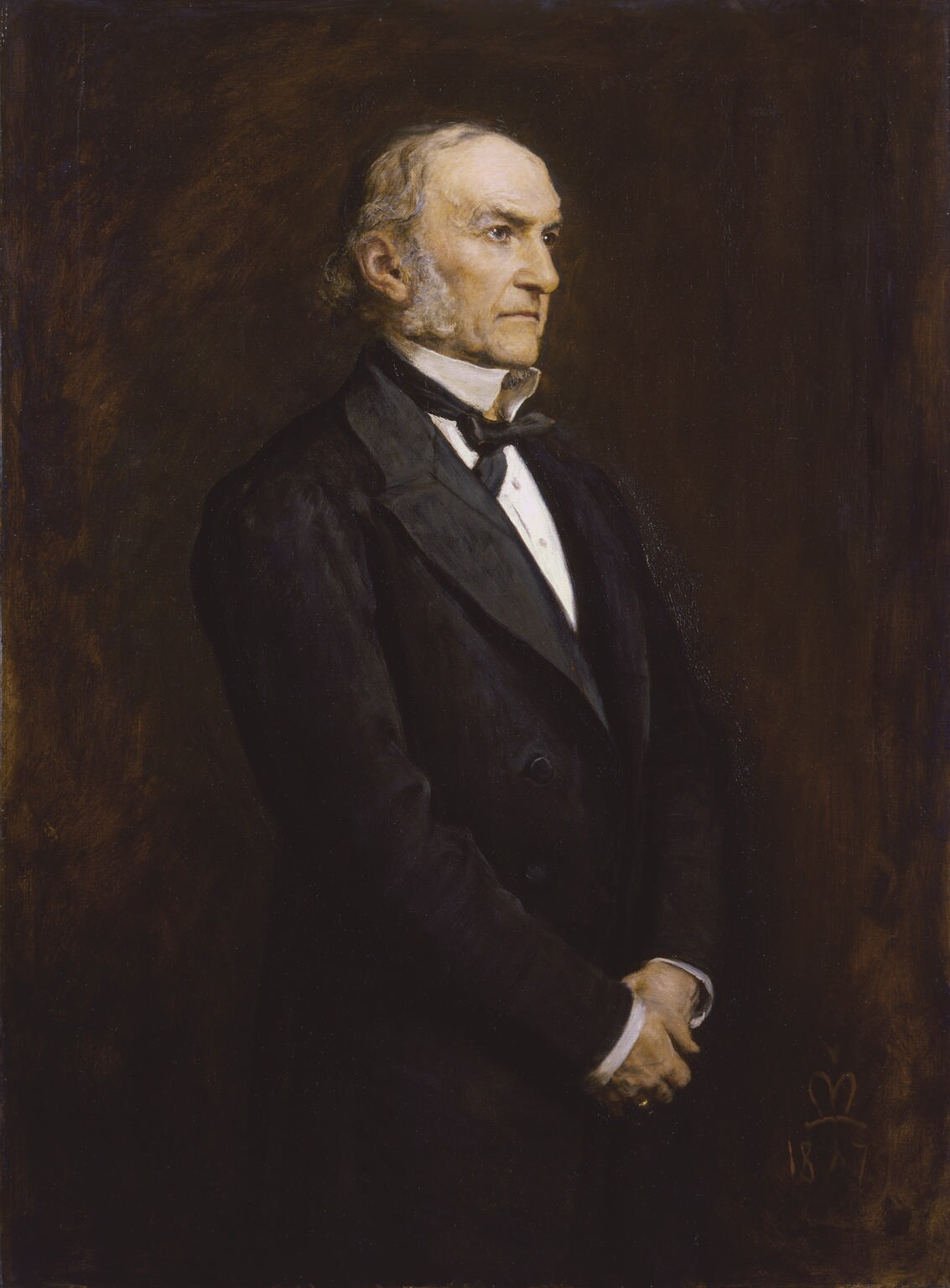
Portrait of William Ewart Gladstone by John Everett Millais, 1879

Gladstonian liberalism or Gladstonianism is a political doctrine named after the British Victorian Prime Minister and Liberal Party leader William Ewart Gladstone. Gladstonian liberalism consisted of limited government expenditure and low taxation whilst making sure government had balanced budgets and the classical liberal stress on self-help and freedom of choice. Gladstonian liberalism also emphasised free trade, opposed government intervention in the economy and supported freedom and liberty as moral ideals. It is referred to as laissez-faire or classical liberalism in the United Kingdom and is often compared to Thatcherism.

Gladstonian financial rectitude had a partial lasting impact on British politics and the historian John Vincent contends that under Lord Salisbury's premiership he "left Britain's low tax, low cost, low growth economy, with its Gladstonian finance and its free trade dogmas, and no conscript army, exactly as he had found it. ... Salisbury reigned, but Gladstone ruled". In the early 20th century the Liberal Party began to move away from Gladstonian liberalism and instead developed new policies based on social liberalism (or what Gladstone called "constructionism"). The Liberal government of 1905–1914 is noted for its social reforms and these included old age pensions and National Insurance. Taxation and public expenditure was also increased and New Liberal ideas led to David Lloyd George's People's Budget of 1909–1910.

The first Labour Chancellor of the Exchequer, Philip Snowden, had Gladstonian economic views. This was demonstrated in his first Budget in 1924 as government expenditure was curtailed, taxes were lowered and duties on tea, coffee, cocoa and sugar were reduced. Historian A. J. P. Taylor remarked that this budget "would have delighted the heart of Gladstone". Ernest Bevin remarked on becoming Minister of Labour in 1940: "They say that Gladstone was at the Treasury from 1860 to 1930".

== Gladstonian era ==
For 30 years, Gladstone and liberalism were synonymous. William Ewart Gladstone served as Prime Minister four times (1868–1874, 1880–1885, 1886 and 1892–1894). His financial policies, based on the notion of balanced budgets, low taxes and laissez-faire, were suited to a developing capitalist society. Called the "Grand Old Man" later in life, Gladstone was a dynamic popular orator who appealed strongly to the working class and to the lower middle class. Deeply religious, Gladstone brought a new moral tone to politics, with his evangelical sensibility and his opposition to aristocracy. His moralism often angered his upper-class opponents (including Queen Victoria) and his heavy-handed control split the Liberal Party.

In foreign policy, Gladstone was in general against foreign entanglements, but he did not resist the realities of imperialism. For example, he approved of the occupation of Egypt by British forces in 1882. His goal was to create a European order based on co-operation rather than conflict and on mutual trust instead of rivalry and suspicion whilst the rule of law was to supplant the reign of force and self-interest. This Gladstonian concept of a harmonious Concert of Europe was opposed and ultimately defeated by a Bismarckian system of manipulated alliances and antagonisms.

As Prime Minister from 1868 to 1874, Gladstone headed a Liberal Party which was a coalition of Peelites like himself, Whigs and Radicals. He was now a spokesman for "peace, economy and reform". In terms of historic reforms, his first ministry was his most successful. He was an idealist who insisted that government should take the lead in making society more efficient and more fair and that the government should expand its role in society in order to extend liberty and toleration. The Elementary Education Act 1870 set up state-run elementary (primary) schools, administered by locally elected school boards. The judicial system was made up of multiple overlapping and conflicting courts dating back centuries. The Supreme Court of Judicature Act 1873 merged them into one central system of courts, empowered to administer both law and equity. The Northcote-Trevelyan Report on civil service recruitment of twenty years earlier was implemented by Order in Council, replacing appointment by family and patronage with examinations to recognise talent and ability. The Trade Union Act 1871 made unions legal and protected their funding from lawsuits, but picketing of employers' premises was made illegal under the Criminal Law Amendment Act 1871 (repealed by the Conservatives in 1875). The secret ballot was enacted by the Ballot Act 1872 to prevent the buying of votes—politicians would not pay out the money if they were not sure how the person voted. While the Navy was in fine shape, the Army was not. Its organization was confused, its policies unfair and its cruel punishments were based chiefly on brutal flogging. At the county level, politicians named the officers of the county militia units, preferring social connections over ability. The regular army called for enlistments for twenty-one years, but with reforms initiated by Edward Cardwell, Gladstone's secretary for war, enlistments were reduced to six years, plus six years in reserve. Regiments were organized by territorial districts and equipped with modern rifles. The complex chain of command was simplified and in wartime the county militias were under the control of the central war office. Purchase of officer commissions was abolished and flogging in peacetime was also abolished. The reforms were not quite complete as the Royal Duke of Cambridge still had great authority despite his mediocre abilities. Historians have given Gladstone high marks on his successful reform program.

The (Anglican) Church of Ireland, serving a small minority of the Irish, was disestablished through the Irish Church Act 1869. Catholics no longer had to pay taxes to it. Other Liberal efforts focused on land reform, where the Landlord and Tenant (Ireland) Act 1870 entitled Irish tenants, if evicted, to compensation for any improvements which they had made to their land.

In the 1874 general election, Gladstone was defeated by the Conservatives under Benjamin Disraeli during a sharp economic recession. He formally resigned as Liberal leader and was succeeded by the Marquess of Hartington, but he soon changed his mind and returned to active politics. He strongly disagreed with Disraeli's pro-Ottoman foreign policy (see Great Eastern Crisis) and in 1880 conducted the first outdoor mass-election campaign in Britain, known as the Midlothian campaign. The Liberals won a large majority in the 1880 election. Hartington and Lord Granville, the Liberal leader in the Lords, both declined Queen Victoria's invitation to form a government and Gladstone resumed office.

Gladstone's second government was dominated by Irish affairs. The Irish Parliamentary Party had become the main party in Ireland after the enactment of the secret ballot in 1872, and was now led by Charles Stewart Parnell. This was a time of great agrarian unrest in Ireland (the Land War), partly assuaged by the Land Law (Ireland) Act 1881 which entitled Irish tenants to "the Three Fs" – a fair rent fixed by tribunal, fixity of tenure and the right to freely sell on their tenancy. Parnell was briefly imprisoned, but was released in return for a promise (the so-called Kilmainham Treaty) to attempt to end the violence. The Representation of the People Act 1884 extended household suffrage – introduced in urban seats by Disraeli in 1867 – to rural seats. One of the effects was the enfranchisement of many Catholics, further increasing Parnell's power. In the 1885 general election, Parnell's party won the balance of power in the House of Commons and demanded Irish Home Rule as the price of support for a new Gladstone ministry. Gladstone personally supported Home Rule, but a strong Liberal Unionist faction led by the last of the Whigs, Hartington, opposed it, as did the radical Joseph Chamberlain. Irish nationalist reaction was mixed, Unionist opinion was hostile, and the bill was defeated in the House of Commons. The election addresses during the 1886 election revealed many English Gladstonian radicals to be against the bill also, reflecting fears at the constituency level that the interests of the working people were being sacrificed to finance Gladstone's proposals to buy out Anglo-Irish landlords. The result was a catastrophic split in the Liberal Party led by Hartington and Joseph Chamberlain, who formed the breakaway Liberal Unionist Party. The Liberals met heavy defeat in the 1886 general election at the hands of Lord Salisbury.

There was a final weak Gladstone ministry in 1892, but it also was dependent on Irish support and failed to get Irish Home Rule through the House of Lords. Gladstone finally retired in 1894, ostensibly because of his opposition to what he saw as excessive spending on the Royal Navy but in reality because his Cabinet refused to support his wish to curb the powers of the House of Lords. Following the Conservatives' creation of elected county councils in 1888, district and parish councils were created by the Liberal government's Local Government Act 1894. Gladstone's successor, the Earl of Rosebery, led the party to another heavy defeat in the 1895 general election.

== See also ==
- Classical liberalism
- Fiscal liberalism
- Liberalism in the United Kingdom
  - Libertarianism in the United Kingdom
