= Master and Servant Act 1867 =

Act of the Parliament of the United Kingdom

Master and Servant Act 1867 (Note: Section 1.)
- Act of Parliament
- Parliament of the United Kingdom
- Long title: An Act to amend the Statute Law as between Master and Servant.
- Citation: 30 & 31 Vict. c. 141
- Territorial extent: United Kingdom

Dates
- Royal assent: 20 August 1867
- Commencement: 20 August 1867 (Note: The Acts of Parliament (Commencement) Act 1793.)
- Repealed: 1 September 1875
Other legislation
Amended by	Statute Law Revision Act 1875
Repealed by	Conspiracy and Protection of Property Act 1875
Relates to	Combinations of Workmen Act 1825; Employers and Workmen Act 1875

Status: Repealed

Text of statute as originally enacted

The Master and Servant Act 1867 (30 & 31 Vict. c. 141) was an act of the Parliament of the United Kingdom which sought to criminalise breach of contract by workers against their employers.

Although it did still give employers and prosecutors warrant to prosecute breach of contract the act was more progressive than the former standard set by the Combinations of Workmen Act 1825 (6 Geo. 4. c. 129) whereby employees seeking to form labor unions and such could be prosecuted for criminal conspiracy in restraint of trade. Under the new standard employees could only be charged for "aggravated cases" and breach of contract, which was at the time seen as an improvement.

Of note is the fact that this piece of legislation was passed by the conservative statesman Benjamin Disraeli and his likewise conservative political bloc.

== Provisions ==
=== Short title, commencement and extent ===
Section 1 of the act provided that the act may be cited as The Master and Servant Act, 1867.

Section 25 of the act provided that nothing in the act would extend to or be made applicable to any enactment in the first schedule to the act in relation to Ireland or any part of Great Britain.

Citation	Short title	Description
7 Geo. 1. Stat. 1. c. 13. ss. 4, 6	Journeymen Tailors, London Act 1720	An Act for regulating the Journeymen Taylors within the Weekly Bills of Mortality.
9 Geo. 1. c. 27 s. 1	Frauds by Journeymen Shoemakers Act 1722	An Act preventing Journeymen Shoemakers selling, exchanging, or pawning Boots, Shoes, Slippers, cut Leather, or other Materials for making Boots, Shoes, or Slippers, and for better regulating the said Journeymen.
13 Geo. 2. c. 8. ss. 7, 8	Frauds of Workmen Act 1739	An Act to explain and amend an Act made in the First Year of the Reign of Her late Majesty Queen Anne, intituled An Act for the more effectual preventing the Abuses and Frauds of Persons employed in the working up the Woollen, Linen, Fustian, Cotton, and Iron Manufactures of this Kingdom; and for extending the said Act to the Manufactures of Leather.
20 Geo. 2. c. 19	Regulation of Servants and Apprentices Act 1746	An Act for the better adjusting and more easy Recovery of the Wages of certain Servants; and for the better Regulation of such Servants and of certain Apprentices, which provides for the Settlement of Disputes between Masters and Servants, and for the better Regulation of such Servants and of certain Apprentices
27 Geo. 2. c. 6	Stannaries (Servants and Apprentices) Act 1754	An Act to repeal a Proviso in an Act made in the Twentieth Year of His present Majesty's Reign, intituled An Act for the better adjusting and more easy Recovery of the Wages of certain Servants, and for the better Regulation of such Servants and of certain Apprentices, which provides that the said Act shall not extend to the Stannaries in Devon and Cornwall.
31 Geo. 2. c. 11. s. 3	Apprentices (Settlement) Act 1757	An Act to amend an Act made in the Third Year of the Reign of King William and Queen Mary, intituled An Act for the better Explanation and supplying the Defects of the former Laws for the Settlement of the Poor, so far as the same relates to Apprentices gaining a Settlement by Indenture; and also to empower Justices of the Peace to determine Differences between Masters and Mistresses and their Servants in Husbandry, touching their Wages, though such Servants are hired for less Time than a Year.
6 Geo. 3. c. 25	Regulation of Apprentices Act 1766	An Act for better regulating Apprentices, and Persons working under Contract.
17 Geo. 3. c. 56. ss. 8, 12	Frauds by Workmen Act 1777	An Act for amending and rendering more effectual the several Laws now in being, for the more effectual preventing Frauds and Abuses by Persons employed in the Manufacture of Hats, and in the Woollen, Linen, Fustian, Cotton, Iron, Leather, Fur, Hemp, Flax, Mohair, and Silk Manufactures; and also for making Provisions to prevent Frauds by Journeymen Dyers.
33 Geo. 3. c. 55. s. 1, 2	Parish Officers Act 1793	An Act to authorize Justices of the Peace to impose Fines upon Constables, Overseers, and other Peace or Parish Officers, for Neglect of Duty, and on Masters of Apprentices for ill-usage of such their Apprentices ; and also to make Provision for the Execution of Warrants of Distress granted by Magistrates.
39 & 40 Geo. 3. c. 77. s. 3	Collieries and Mines Act 1800	An Act for the Security of Collieries and Mines, and for the better Regulation of Colliers and Miners
59 Geo. 3. c. 92. ss. 5, 6	Conveyance of Offenders (Ireland) Act 1819	An Act to enable Justices of the Peace in Ireland to act as such, in certain Cases, out of the Limits of the Counties in which they actually are; to make Provision for the Execution of Warrants of Distress granted by them; and to authorize them to impose Fines upon Constables and other Officers for Neglect of Duty, and on Masters of Apprentices for ill-usage of their Apprentices.
4 Geo. 4. c. 29	Powers of Justices as to Apprenticeships Act 1823	An Act to increase the Power of Magistrates in Cases of Apprenticeship.
4 Geo. 4. c. 34	Master and Servant Act 1823	An Act to enlarge the Powers of Justices in determining Complaints between Masters and Servants, and between Masters, Apprentices, Artificers, and others.
10 Geo. 4. c. 52	Masters and Apprentices Act 1829	An Act to extend the Powers of an Act of the Fourth Year of His present Majesty, for enlarging the Powers of Justices in determining Complaints between Masters and Servants to Persons engaged in the Fisheries.
5 & 6 Vict. c. 7	Parish Apprentices Act 1842	An Act to explain the Acts for the better Regulation of certain Apprentices.
6 & 7 Vict. c. 40. s. 7	Hosiery Act 1843	An Act to amend the Laws for the Prevention of Frauds and Abuses by Persons employed in the Woollen, Worsted, Linen, Cotton, Flax, Mohair, and Silk Hosiery Manufactures; and for the further securing the Property of the Manufacturers and the Wages of the Workmen engaged therein.
14 & 15 Vict. c. 92. s. 16	Summary Jurisdiction (Ireland) Act 1851	The Summary Jurisdiction (Ireland) Act, 1851

== Subsequent developments ==
The Employers and Workmen Act 1875 (38 & 39 Vict. c. 90) was passed in substitution for the act.

The whole act, and all non-excepted enactments listed in the first schedule to the act, were repealed by section 17 of the Conspiracy and Protection of Property Act 1875 (38 & 39 Vict. c. 86), which came into force on 1 September 1875.

== See also ==
- UK labour law
- Master and Servant Act

== Bibliography ==
- Davis, James Edward. The Master and Servant Act, 1867. Butterworths. London. Hodges, Smith and Co. Dublin. 1868.
- Davis, James Edward. "Lord Elcho's Master and Servant Act,1867". The Labour Laws. Butterworths. Fleet Street, London. 1875. Chapter 2. Pages 15 to 27. See also page 99.
- Paterson, William (ed). The Practical Statutes of the Session 1867. Horace Cox. London. 1867. Pages 389 to 407.
- Holdsworth, William Andrew. "Of the Jurisdiction of the Magistrates under the Master and Servant Act 1867". The Law of Master and Servant. George Routledge and Sons. London. 1873. Chapter 14. Pages 135 to 146.
- "Master and Servant Act, 1867" (1872) 16 Journal of Jurisprudence 204
