= United Kingdom mines and quarries regulation in 1910 =

The United Kingdom mines and quarries regulation in 1910 was a specialised topic in UK labour law, given the complexity of the legislation and seriousness of injuries that people suffered.

== Coal mines ==
The mode of progress to be recorded in the regulation of coal mines since 1872 can be contrasted in one aspect with the progress just recorded of factory legislation since 1878. Consolidation was again earlier adopted when large amendments were found necessary, with the result that by far the greater part of the law is to be found in the Coal Mines Regulation Act 1887 (50 & 51 Vict. c. 58), which repealed and re-enacted, with amendments, the Coal Mines Act 1872, the Coal Mines Act 1886, and the Stratified Ironstone Mines (Gunpowder) Act 1881. The act of 1881 was simply concerned with rules relating to the use of explosives underground. The Coal Mines Act 1886 dealt with three questions:

(a) The election and payment of checkweighers (i.e. the persons appointed and paid by miners in pursuance of section 13 of the Coal Mines Regulation Act 1887 for the purpose of taking a correct account on their behalf of the weight of the mineral gotten by them, and for the correct determination of certain deductions for which they may be liable);
(b) provision for new powers of the secretary of state to direct a formal investigation of any explosion or accident, and its causes and circumstances, a provision which was later adopted in the law relating to factories;
(c) provision enabling any relatives of persons whose death may have been caused by explosions or accidents in or about mines to attend in person, or by agent, coroners' inquests thereon, and to examine witnesses.

The Coal Mines Regulation Act 1887, which amended, strengthened and consolidated these acts and the earlier Coal Mines Act 1872, may also be contrasted in another aspect with the general acts of factory legislation. In scope it formed, as its principal forerunner had done, a general code; and in some measure it went farther in the way of consolidation than the Factory Acts had done, inasmuch as certain questions, which in factories are dealt with by statutes distinct from the Factory Acts, have been included in the Mines Regulation Acts, e.g. the prohibition of the payment of wages in public-houses, and the machinery relating to weights and measures whereby miners control their payment; further, partly from the less changing nature of the industry, but probably mainly from the power of expression gained for miners by their organisation, the code, so far as it went, at each stage answered apparently on the whole more nearly to the views and needs of the persons protected than the parallel law relating to factories. This was strikingly seen in the evidence before the Royal Commission on Labour in 1892-1894, where the repeated expression of satisfaction on the part of the miners with the provisions as distinct from the administration of the code (" with a few trifling exceptions ") is in marked contrast with the long and varied series of claims and contentions put forward for amendment of the Factory Acts.

Since the Coal Mines Regulation Act 1887, there have followed five minor acts, based on the recommendation of the officials acting under the acts, while two of them give effect to claims made by the miners before the Royal Commission on Labour. Thus the Coal Mines (Checkweigher) Act 1894 rendered it illegal for an employer ("owner, agent, or manager of any mine, or any person employed by or acting under the instructions of any such owner, agent, or manager") to make the removal of a particular checkweigher a condition of employment, or to exercise improper influence in the appointment of a checkweigher. The need for this provision was demonstrated by a decision of the Court of Session in Edinburgh, which upheld an employer in his claim to the right of dismissing all the workmen and re-engaging them on condition that they would dismiss a particular checkweigher. The Coal Mines Regulation Act 1896 (59 & 60 Vict. c. 43) extended the powers to propose, amend and modify special rules, provided for representation of workmen on arbitration under the principal act on any matter in difference, modified the provision for plans of mines in working and abandoned mines, amended three of the general rules (inspection before commencing work, use of safety lamps and non-inflammable substances for stemming), and empowered the secretary of state by order to prohibit or regulate the use of any explosive likely to become dangerous. The Mines (Prohibition of Child Labour Underground) Act 1900 (63 & 64 Vict. c. 21) raised the age of employment of boys underground from twelve to thirteen. The Coal Mines Regulation Act (1887) Amendment Act 1903 (3 Edw. 7. c. 7) allowed as an alternative qualification for a manager's certificate a diploma in scientific and mining training after at least two years' study at a university mining school or other educational institution approved by the secretary of state, coupled with practical experience of at least three years in a mine. In the same year, the Employment of Children Act 1903 affected children in mines to the extent already indicated in connexion with factories. The Coal Mines (Weighing of Minerals) Act 1905 improved some provisions relating to appointment and pay of checkweighers and facilities for them and their duly appointed deputies in carrying out their duties. The Notice of Accidents Act 1906 provided for improved annual returns of accidents and for immediate reporting to the district inspector of accidents under newly defined conditions as they arise in coal and metalliferous mines.

While the classes of mines regulated by the Coal Mines Regulation Act 1887 are the same as those regulated by the Coal Mines Act 1872 (i.e. mines of coal, of stratified ironstone, of shale and of fire-clay, including, works above ground where the minerals are prepared for use by screening, washing, &c.) the interpretation of the term " mine " is wider and simpler, including " every shaft in the course of being sunk, and every level and inclined plane in the course of being driven, and all the shafts, levels, planes, works, tramways and sidings, both below ground and above ground, in and adjacent to and belonging to the mine." Of the persons responsible under penalty for the observance of the acts the term "owner" is defined precisely as in the Coal Mines Act 1872, but the term "agent" is modified to mean "any person appointed as the representative of the owner in respect of any mine or any part thereof, and, as such, superior to a manager appointed in pursuance of this act." Of the persons protected, the term "young person" disappeared from the act, and "boy," i.e. "a male under the age of sixteen years," and "girl," i.e. "a female under the age of sixteen years," take their place, and the term "woman" means, as before, "a female of the age of sixteen years and upwards." The prohibition of employment underground of women and girls remains untouched, and the prohibition of employment underground of boys has been successively extended from boys of the age of ten in 1872 to boys of twelve in 1887 and to boys of thirteen in 1900. The age of employment of boys and girls above ground in connexion with any mine is raised from ten years in 1872 to twelve years since 1887. The hours of employment of a boy below ground may not exceed fifty-four in any one week, nor ten in any one day from the time of leaving the surface to the time of returning to the surface. Above ground any boy or girl under thirteen (and over twelve) may not be employed on more than six days in any one week; if employed on more than three days in one week, the daily total must not exceed six hours, or in any other case ten hours. Protected persons above thirteen are limited to the same daily and weekly total of hours as boys below ground, but there are further provisions with regard to intervals for meals and prohibiting employment for more than five hours without an interval of at least half an hour for a meal. Registers must be kept of all protected persons, whether employed above or below ground. Section 38 of the Public Health Act 1875 (38 & 39 Vict. c. 55), which requires separate and sufficient sanitary conveniences for persons of each sex, was first extended by the Coal Mines Regulation Act 1887 to the portions of mines above ground in which girls and women are employed; underground this matter is in metalliferous mines in Cornwall now provided for by special rules. Ventilation, the only other requirement in the acts that can be classed as sanitary, is provided for in every mine in the " general rules " which are aimed at securing safety of mines, and which, so far as ventilation is concerned, seek to dilute and render harmless noxious or inflammable gases. The provision which prohibits employment of any persons in mines not provided with at least two shafts is made much more stringent by the Coal Mines Regulation Act 1887 than in the previous code, by increasing the distance between the two shafts from 10 to 15 yards, and increasing the height of communications between them. Other provisions amended or strengthened are those relating to the following points:

(a) Daily personal supervision of the mine by the certificated manager;
(b) classes of certificates and constitution of board for granting certificates of competency;
(c) plan of workings of any mine to be kept up to a date not more than three months previously at the office of the mine;
(d) notice to be given to the inspector of the district by the owner, agent or manager, of accidents in or about any mine which cause loss of life or serious personal injury, or are caused by explosion of coal or coal dust or any explosive or electricity or any other special cause that the secretary of state specifies by order, and which causes any personal injury to any person employed in or about the mine; it is provided that the place where an explosion or accident occurs causing loss of life or serious personal injury shall be left for inspection for at least three days, unless this would tend to increase or continue a danger or impede working of the mine: this was new in the Coal Mines Regulation Act 1887;
(e) notice to be given of opening and abandonment of any mine: this was extended to the opening or abandonment of any seam;
(f) plan of an abandoned mine or seam to be sent within three months;
(g) formal investigation of any explosion or accident by direction of the secretary of state: this provision, first introduced by the Coal Mines Act 1886 was modified in the Coal Mines Regulation Act 1887 to admit the appointment by the secretary of state of "any competent person" to hold the investigation, whereas under the earlier section only an inspector could be appointed.

The "general rules" for safety in mines have been strengthened in many ways since the Coal Mines Act 1872. Particular mention may be made of rule 4 of the Coal Mines Regulation Act 1887, relating to the inspection of conditions as to gas ventilation beyond appointed stations at the entrance to the mine or different parts of the mine; this rule generally removed the earlier distinction between mines in which inflammable gas has been found within the preceding twelve months, and mines in which it has not been so found; of rules 8, 9, 10 and 11, relating to the construction, use, etc., of safety lamps, which are more detailed and stringent than rule 7 of the Coal Mines Act 1872, which they replaced; of rule 12, relating to the use of explosives below ground; of rule 24, which requires the appointment of a competent male person not less than twenty-two years of age for working the machinery for lowering and raising persons at the mine; of rule 34, which first required provision of ambulances or stretchers with splints and bandages at the mine ready for immediate use; of rule 38, which strengthened the provision for periodical inspection of the mine by practical miners on behalf of the workmen at their own cost. With reference to the last-cited rule, during 1898 a Prussian mining commission visited Great Britain, France and Belgium, to study and compare the various methods of inspection by working miners established in these three countries. They found that, so far as the method had been applied, it was most satisfactory in Great Britain, where the whole cost is borne by the workers' own organisations, and they attributed part of the decrease in number of accidents per thousand employed since 1872 to the inauguration of this system.

The provisions as to the proposal, amendment and modification of "special rules," last extended by the Coal Mines Regulation Act 1896, may be contrasted with those of the Factory Act. In the latter Special it is not until an industry or process has been scheduled p as dangerous or injurious by the secretary of state's order that occasion arises for the formation of special rules, and then the initiative rests with the Factory Department whereas in mines it is incumbent in every case on the owner, agent or manager to propose within three months of the commencement of any working, for the approval of the secretary of state, special rules best calculated to prevent dangerous accidents, and to provide for the safety, convenience and proper discipline of the persons employed in or about the mine. These rules may, if they relate to lights and lamps used in the mine, description of explosives, watering and damping of the mine, or prevention of accidents from inflammable gas or coal dust, supersede any general rule in the principal act. Apart from the initiation of the rules, the methods of establishing them, whether by agreement or by resort to arbitration of the parties (i.e. the mine owners and the secretary of state), are practically the same as under the Factory Act, but there is special provision in the Mines Acts for enabling the persons working in the mine to transmit objections to the proposed rules, in addition to their subsequent right to be represented on the arbitration, if any.

Of the sections touching on wages questions, the prohibition of the payment of wages in public-houses remains unaltered, being re-enacted in the Coal Mines Regulation Act 1887; the sections relating to payment by weight for amount of mineral gotten by persons employed, and for checkweighing the amount by a "checkweigher" stationed by the majority of workers at each place appointed for the weighing of the material, were revised, particularly as to the determination of deductions by the Coal Mines Regulation Act 1887, with a view to meeting some problems raised by decisions on cases under the Coal Mines Act 1872. The attempt seems not to have been wholly successful, the highest legal authorities having expressed conflicting opinions on the precise meaning of the terms "mineral contracted to be gotten." The whole history of the development of this means of securing the fulfilment of wage contract to the workers may be compared with the history of the sections affording protection to piece-workers by particulars of work and wages in the textile trades since the Factory and Workshop Act 1891.

As regards legal proceedings, the chief amendments of the Coal Mines Act 1872 are: the extension of the provision that the "owner, agent, administrator or manager" charged in respect of any contravention. by another person might be sworn and examined as an ordinary witness, to any person charged with any offence under the act. The result of the proceedings against workmen by the owner, agent or manager in respect of an offence under the act is to be reported within twenty-one days to the inspector of the district. The powers of inspectors were extended to cover an inquiry as to the care and treatment of horses and other animals in the mine, and as to the control, management or direction of the mine by the manager.

The Coal Mines Regulation Act 1908 (8 Edw. 7. c. 57) limiting the hours of work for workmen below ground. It enacted that, subject to various provisions, a workman was not to be below ground in a mine for the purpose of his work, and of going to and from his work, for more than eight hours in any consecutive twenty-four hours. Exception was made in the case of those below ground for the purpose of rendering assistance in the event of an accident, or for meeting any danger, or for dealing with any emergency or work not completed, through unforeseen circumstances, which requires to be dealt with to avoid serious interference in the work of the mine. The authorities of every mine must fix the times for the lowering and raising of the men to begin and be completed, and such times must be conspicuously posted at the pit head. These times must be approved by an inspector. The term " workman " in the act means any person employed in a mine below ground who is not an official of the mine (other than a fireman, examiner or deputy), or a mechanic or a horse keeper or a person engaged solely in surveying or measuring. In the case of a fireman, examiner, deputy, onsetter, pump minder, fanman or furnace man, the maximum period for which he may be below ground is nine hours and a half. A registry must be kept by the authorities of the mine of the times of descent and ascent, while the workmen may, at their own cost, station persons (whether holding the office of checkweigher or not) at the pit head to observe the times. The authorities of the mine may extend the hours of working by one hour a day on not more than sixty days in one calendar year (s. 3). The act may be suspended by order in council in the event of war or of imminent national danger or great emergency, or in the event of any grave economic disturbance due to the demand for coal exceeding the supply available at any time. The act came into force on 1 July 1909 except for the counties of Northumberland and Durham where its operation was postponed until 1 January 1910.

In 1905 the number of coal-mines reported on was 3,126, and the number of persons employed below ground was 691,112 of whom 43,443 were under 16 years of age. Above ground 167,261 were employed, of whom 6,154 were women and girls. The number of separate fatal accidents was 1,006, causing the loss of 1,205 lives. Of prosecutions by far the greater number were against workmen, numbering in coal and metalliferous mines 953; owners and managers were prosecuted in 72 cases, and convictions obtained in 43 cases.

== Quarries ==
From 1878 until 1894 open quarries (as distinct from underground quarries regulated by the Metalliferous Mines Regulation Act) were regulated only by the Factory Acts so far as they then applied. It was laid down in section 93 of the Factory and Workshop Act 1878 (41 & 42 Vict. c. 16), that "any premises or place shall not be excluded from the definition of a factory or workshop by reason only that such premises, &c., are or is in the open air," thereby overruling the decision in Kent v. Astley that quarries in which the work, as a whole, was carried on in the open air were not factories; in a schedule to the same act quarries were defined as "any place not being a mine in which persons work in getting slate, stone, coprolites or other minerals." The Factory Act 1891 made it possible to bring these places in part under "special rules" adapted to meet the special risks and dangers of the operations carried on in them, and by order of the secretary of state they were certified, December 1892, as dangerous, and thereby subject to special rules. Until then, as reported by one of the inspectors of factories, quarries had been placed under the Factory Acts without insertion of appropriate rules for their safe working, and many of them were "developed in a most dangerous manner without any regard for safety, but merely for economy," and managers of many had "scarcely seen a quarry until they became managers." In his report for 1892 it was recommended by the chief inspector of factories that quarries should be subject to the jurisdiction of the government inspectors of mines. At the same time currency was given, by the published reports of the evidence before the Royal Commission on Labour, to the wish of large numbers of quarrymen that open as well as underground quarries should come under more specialised government inspection. In 1893 a committee of experts, including inspectors of mines and of factories, was appointed by the Home Office to investigate the conditions of labour in open quarries, and the Quarries Act 1894 brought every quarry, as defined in the Factory and Workshop Act 1878, any part of which is more than 20 ft. deep, under certain of the provisions of the Metalliferous Mines Acts, and under the inspection of the inspectors appointed under those acts; further, it transferred the duty of enforcing the Factory and Workshop Acts, so far as they apply in quarries over 20 ft. deep, from the Factory to the Metalliferous Mines inspectors.

The provisions of the Metalliferous Mines Act 1872 and the Metalliferous Mines Act 1875, applied to quarries, are those relating to payment of wages in public-houses, notice of accidents to the inspector, appointment and powers of inspectors, arbitration, coroners' inquests, special rules, penalties, certain of the definitions, and the powers of the secretary of state finally to decide disputed questions whether places come within the application of the acts. For other matters, and in particular fencing of machinery and employment of women and young persons, the Factory Acts apply, with a proviso that nothing shall prevent the employment of young persons (boys) in three shifts for not more than eight hours each. In 1899 it was reported by the inspectors of mines that special rules for safety had been established in over 2000 quarries. In the reports for 1905 it was reported that the accounts of blasting accidents indicated that there was " still much laxity in observance of the Special rules, and that many irregular and dangerous practices are in vogue." The absence or deficiency of external fencing to a quarry dangerous to the public has been since the Quarry (Fencing) Act 1887 (50 & 51 Vict. c. 19) deemed a nuisance liable to be dealt with summarily in the manner provided by the Public Health Act 1875 (38 & 39 Vict. c. 55).

In 1905, 94,819 persons were employed, of whom 59,978 worked inside the actual pits or excavations, and 34,841 outside. Compared with 1900, there was a total increase of 924 in the number of persons employed. Fatal accidents resulted in 1900 in 127 deaths; compared with 1899 there was an increase of 10 in the number of deaths, and, as Professor Le Neve Foster pointed out, this exceeded the average death-rate of underground workers at mines under the Coal Mines Acts during the previous ten years, in spite of the quarrier "having nothing to fear from explosions of gas, underground fires or inundations." He attributed the difference to a lax observance of precautions which might in time be remedied by stringent administration of the law. In 1905 there were 97 fatal accidents resulting in 99 deaths. In 1900 there were 92 prosecutions against owners or agents, with 67 convictions, and 13 prosecutions of workers, with 12 convictions, and in 1905 there were 45 prosecutions of owners or agents with 43 convictions and 9 prosecutions of workmen with 5 convictions.

The Payment of Wages in Public-houses Prohibition Act 1883 (46 & 47 Vict. c. 31) extended to all "workmen" who are manual labourers other than miners, with the exception of domestic or menial servants, the prohibition of payment of wages in public-houses, beer-shops and other places for the sale of spirituous or fermented liquor, laid down in the Coal Mines Regulations and Metalliferous Mines Regulation Acts. The places covered by the prohibition include any office, garden or place belonging to or occupied with the places named, but the act does not apply to such wages as are paid by the resident, owner or occupier of the public house, beer-shop and other places included in the prohibition to any workman bona fide employed by him. The penalty for an offence against this act is one not exceeding to (compare the limit of 20 for the corresponding, offence under the Coal Mines Act), and all offences may be prosecuted and penalties recovered in England and Scotland under the Summary Jurisdiction Acts. The act does not apply to Ireland, and no special inspectorate is charged with the duty of enforcing its provisions.

== See also ==
- UK labour law history
