= Master and Servant Act =

Laws regulating the relations between employers and employees

Master and Servant Acts or Masters and Servants Acts were laws designed to regulate relations between employers and employees during the 18th and 19th centuries. The UK's Master and Servant Act 1823 described its purpose as "the better regulations of servants, labourers and work people". This particular act greatly influenced industrial relations and employment law in the United States, Australia (an 1845 act), Canada (1847), Hawaiian Kingdom (1850), New Zealand (1856) and South Africa (1856). These acts are generally regarded as heavily biased towards employers, designed to discipline employees and repress the "combination" of workers in trade unions.

The law required the obedience and loyalty from servants to their contracted employer, with infringements of the contract punishable before a court of law, often with a jail sentence of hard labour. It was used against workers organising for better conditions from its inception until well after the first UK Trade Union Act 1871 was implemented, which secured the legal status of trade unions. Until then, a trade union could be regarded as illegal because of being "in restraint of trade".

A 2013 study found evidence suggesting that:

"Master and Servant law allowed workers to insure themselves against labor market risk by allowing them to credibly commit to stay with an employer despite a higher outside wage; when employees did breach their contracts in hope of higher wages, employers used prosecution to retain labor. The elimination of penal sanctions for breach of contract in 1875 was associated with shorter contracts and higher, but more volatile, wages."

== Use in Britain ==
During the 1860s, punitive provisions were extended by judicial interpretation, leading to the imprisonment of union officials who led strikes or issued verbal calls challenging an employer's hiring practices such as only using non-union workers. A revised Master and Servant Act 1867 was passed, which supposedly limited imprisonment to "aggravated" breaches of contract (where injury to persons or property was likely to result), but it was clear that only workers were subject to its provisions. Imprisonment, even for non-aggravated breaches of contract, continued when working people failed to comply with court orders for specific performance or for non-payment of monetary damages and fines.

Between 1858 and 1875 on average 10,000 prosecutions a year took place under the act in Britain. Ernest Jones, a barrister, estimated that, "[I]n one year alone, 1864, the last return given, under the Master and Servants Act, 10,246 working men were imprisoned at the suit of their masters — not one master at the suit of the men!" There is some evidence, however, that this may not universally have been the case; at least one scholar has shown that local courts enforced causes of action in the early-to-mid-19th century against masters as well, in at least some instances, albeit in Canada.

List of acts

- Master and Servant Act 1823 (4 Geo. 4. c. 34)
- Master and Servant Act 1867 (30 & 31 Vict. c. 141)

== Use in Australia ==
As little as one hour's absence by a free servant without permission could precipitate a punishment of prison or the treadmill. In 1840, employees in Australia who left their employment without permission were subject to being hunted down under the Bushrangers Act. In the Melbourne jurisdiction, between 1835 and 1845, when labour shortages were acute, over 20% of prison inmates had been convicted under the New South Wales Act 1823 for offences including leaving place of work without permission and being found in hotels.

By 1902, the 1823 act had been modified to include forfeit of wages if the written or unwritten contract for work was unfulfilled. Absence from place of work was punishable by imprisonment of up to three months with or without hard labour. There were also penalties of up to 10 pounds for anyone who harboured, concealed or re-employed a 'servant' (i.e. worker) who had deserted or absconded or absented himself from his duty implied in the 'contract'.

The 1823 act is not a widely remembered part of Australian political history (although there is a more general association of unacceptable exploitation of workers with the Victorian period). In 2006 a group of trade unionists referred to the 1823 act in their criticism of the "WorkChoices" industrial relations policies of the Howard government, claiming that "Our rights as workers are back where they were in the early 1800s - the only thing now missing is a Master - Servants Act." Similar comparisons have been made by social commentators, unionists and politicians.

== See also ==
- Master and Servant Act 1889
