= Nokes v Doncaster Amalgamated Collieries Ltd =

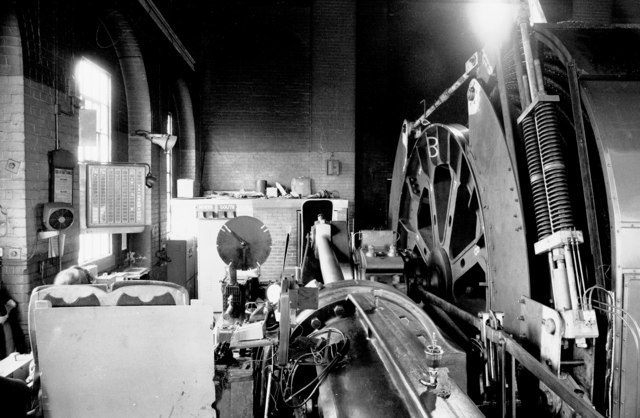
- Court: House of Lords
- Citation: [1940] AC 1014

Case opinions
- Viscount Simon, Lord Atkin, Lord Thankerton, Lord Porter and Lord Romer (dissenting)

Keywords
- Consent, transfer of undertakings

Nokes v Doncaster Amalgamated Collieries Ltd [1940] AC 1014 is a UK labour law case about the common law before the Transfers of Undertakings Directive 2001 and the Transfer of Undertakings (Protection of Employment) Regulations 2006. The case decided that an employee had to consent before a burden was placed on him by a change in employer.

== Facts ==
Mr Nokes had worked for the Hickleton Main Co Ltd until 4 June 1937, when the Chancery Court gave an order for the business to be transferred under the Companies Act 1929, section 154(1), on arrangements and reconstructions to Doncaster Amalgamated Collieries Ltd. Mr Nokes was absent and would be liable to pay damages to the new business under the Employers and Workmen Act 1875, section 4, if he had a service contract with the company, which he denied. However, the Divisional Court and the Court of Appeal) ordered him to pay 15s (approx. £50 today) in damages and 10s (approx. £33 today) in costs. He appealed to the House of Lords.

== Judgment ==
The House of Lords held, by a majority, that Mr Nokes did not have to pay the fee because his employment could not be transferred without his consent. Viscount Simon LC said that it is 'a fundamental principle of our common law... that a free citizen, in the exercise of his freedom, is entitled to choose the employer whom he promises to serve, so that the right to his services cannot be transferred from one employer to another without his assent'. Lord Atkin vigorously denied that Employers and Workmen Act 1875 could result in a fine for the worker and went so far as to say that he regarded any automatic transfer rule would be 'tainted with oppression and confiscation'. He wrote the following.

My Lords, I confess it appears to me astonishing that apart from overriding questions of public welfare power should be given to a court or anyone else to transfer a man without his knowledge and possibly against his will from the service of one person to the service of another. I had fancied that ingrained in the personal status of a citizen under our laws was the right to choose for himself whom he would serve: and that this right of choice constituted the main difference between a servant and a serf... It is said that one company does not differ from another: and why should not a benevolent judge of the Chancery Division transfer the services of a workman to another admirable employer just as good and perhaps better. The answer is two-fold. The first is that however excellent the new master may be it is hitherto the servant who has the choosing of him, and not a judge. The second is that it is a complete mistake in my experience to suppose that people, whether they are servants or landlords or authors do not attach importance to the identity of the particular company with which they deal. It would possibly hurt the feelings of financial gentlemen with large organizing powers and ambitions to know how strongly some people feel about big combinations, and especially amalgamations of small trading concerns. But it is said how unreasonable this is: for the big company can buy the majority of the shares in the old company: replace the directors and managers: change the policy and produce the same result. Be it so: but the result is not the same: the identity of the company is preserved: and in any case the individual concerned, while he must be prepared to run the one risk, is entitled to say that he is not obliged to run the other. The truth is that this argument was tried out and repelled over forty years ago by Stirling J in Griffith v Tower Publishing Co [1897] 1 Ch 21, where an author was held justified in refusing to allow his contract to be transferred to another company. The judgment is very apposite to the present case.

Lord Thankerton and Lord Porter concurred.

Lord Romer dissented.

== See also ==
- UK labour law
