= Parish Apprentices Act 1842 =

Act of the Parliament of the United Kingdom

Parish Apprentices Act 1842 (Note: The citation of this act by this short title was authorised by section 1 of, and the first schedule to, the Short Titles Act 1896. Due to the repeal of those provisions it is now authorised by section 19(2) of the Interpretation Act 1978.)
- Act of Parliament
- Parliament of the United Kingdom
- Long title: An Act to explain the Acts for the better Regulation of certain Apprentices.
- Citation: 5 & 6 Vict. c. 7
- Territorial extent: United Kingdom

Dates
- Royal assent: 23 March 1842
- Commencement: 23 March 1824 (Note: The Acts of Parliament (Commencement) Act 1793.)
- Repealed: 1 October 1927
Other legislation
Amends	Regulation of Servants and Apprentices Act 1746; Parish Apprentices Act 1792; Parish Officers Act 1793; Powers of Justices as to Apprenticeships Act 1823
Amended by	Statute Law Revision Act 1874 (No. 2)
Repealed by	Poor Law Act 1927
Relates to	Master and Servant Act 1867; Conspiracy, and Protection of Property Act 1875

Status: Repealed

Text of statute as originally enacted

The Parish Apprentices Act 1842 (5 & 6 Vict. c. 4) was an act of the Parliament of the United Kingdom, which received royal assent on 23 March 1842 and was repealed in 1927. It extended "the power of magistrates to adjudicate in cases in which no premium has been paid"

== Subsequent developments ==
The whole act was repealed by section 245(1) of, and the eleventh schedule to, Poor Law Act 1927 (17 & 18 Geo. 5. c. 14), which came into force on 1 October 1927.
