= Eleventh and Final Report of the Royal Commissioners appointed to Inquire into the Organization and Rules of Trades Unions and Other Associations =

UK parliamentary commission report

The Eleventh and Final Report of the Royal Commissioners appointed to Inquire into the Organization and Rules of Trades Unions and Other Associations (1868-1869) Parliamentary Papers vol xxxi (or the Report of the Royal Commission on Trade Unions) was a landmark report to the United Kingdom Parliament, which led to the legalisation of trade unions. The royal commissioners who wrote the report were divided, and delivered a majority report, and a dissenting minority report. The minority report was preferred by the Liberal government, and this led to the Trade Union Act 1871.

== Background ==
- Combinations of Workmen Act 1825
- Friendly Societies Act 1855
- Hilton v Eckersley (1855) 6 El & Bl 47
- Reform Act 1867
- Hornby v Close (1867) LR 2 QB 153
- Skinner v Kitch (1867) LR 2 QB 393
- K Marx, Das Kapital (1867)
- Trades Union Congress, first meeting in 1868

== Content ==
=== Majority report ===
The majority report recommended that trade union internal affairs should be regulated in a manner 'resembling in some degree that of Corporations.' But little else. It wanted a system of registration, which would give immunity from criminal law. But union rules would be subject to approval by the Registrar of Friendly Societies, which would reject rules that restricted entry to trade, had a closed shop objective, or permitted sympathetic action on behalf of other workgroups.

Elcho and Herman Merivale dissented in part on the question of whether prosecutions for breach of contract should be allowed.

=== Minority report ===
A combined dissent was written by the Earl of Lichfield Thomas George Anson, Thomas Hughes and Frederic Harrison. Their minority report emphasised the work of unions in providing benefits to their members. It recommended they be given sufficient legal status to have immunity from criminal and restraint of trade laws, and to enable protection of their funds. It wanted rule registration, but no control for the Registrar, except where incomplete or fraudulent, and no legal process over union internal affairs.

== See also ==
- UK labour law
