= Conspiracy, and Protection of Property Act 1875 =

Act of the Parliament of the United Kingdom

Conspiracy, and Protection of Property Act 1875 (Note: Section 1.)
- Act of Parliament
- Parliament of the United Kingdom
- Long title: An Act for amending the Law relating to Conspiracy, and to the Protection of Property, and for other purposes.
- Citation: 38 & 39 Vict. c. 86
- Territorial extent: United Kingdom

Dates
- Royal assent: 13 August 1875
- Commencement: 1 September 1875 (Note: Section 2.)
- Repealed: 21 July 2008
Other legislation
Amends	See § Repealed enactments
Repeals/revokes	See § Repealed enactments
Amended by	Statute Law Revision Act 1883; Summary Jurisdiction Act 1884; Courts Act 1971; Statute Law (Repeals) Act 1989; Trade Union and Labour Relations (Consolidation) Act 1992; Statute Law (Repeals) Act 1993
Repealed by	Statute Law (Repeals) Act 2008
Relates to	Trade Union Act 1871; Employers and Workmen Act 1875

Status: Repealed

Text of statute as originally enacted

Revised text of statute as amended

The Conspiracy, and Protection of Property Act 1875 (38 & 39 Vict. c. 86) was an act of the Parliament of the United Kingdom relating to labour relations, which together with the Employers and Workmen Act 1875 (c. 90), fully decriminalised the work of trade unions. Based on an extension of the conclusions of the Cockburn Commission, it was introduced by a Conservative government under Benjamin Disraeli.

The act held that a trade union could not be prosecuted for act which would be legal if conducted by an individual. This meant that labour disputes were civil matters, not for consideration by criminal courts. One result of this was that picketing was decriminalised. The law also made certain forms of stalking illegal.

== Provisions ==
=== Short title, commencement and extent ===
Section 1 of the act provided that the act may be cited as "The Conspiracy, and Protection of Property Act 1875".

Section 2 of the act provided that the act would come into force on 1 September 1875.

=== Repealed enactments ===
Section 17 of the act repealed the Criminal Law Amendment Act 1871 (34 & 35 Vict. c. 32) and the Master and Servant Act 1867 (30 & 31 Vict. c. 141).

Section 17 of the act also repealed all the enactments listed in the first schedule to the Master and Servant Act 1867 (30 & 31 Vict. c. 141), with the following exceptions:

Citation	Short title	Description	Extent of repeal
7 Geo. 1. Stat. 1. c. 13	Journeymen Tailors, London Act 1720	An Act for regulating the Journeymen Taylors within the Weekly Bills of Mortality.	Sections 4 and 6. (Note: This was the remaining unrepealed parts of the act.)
9 Geo. 1. c. 27 s. 1	Frauds by Journeymen Shoemakers Act 1722	An Act preventing Journeymen Shoemakers selling, exchanging, or pawning Boots, Shoes, Slippers, cut Leather, or other Materials for making Boots, Shoes, or Slippers, and for better regulating the said Journeymen.	The whole act.
13 Geo. 2. c. 8. ss. 7, 8	Frauds of Workmen Act 1739	An Act to explain and amend an Act made in the First Year of the Reign of Her late Majesty Queen Anne, intituled An Act for the more effectual preventing the Abuses and Frauds of Persons employed in the working up the Woollen, Linen, Fustian, Cotton, and Iron Manufactures of this Kingdom; and for extending the said Act to the Manufactures of Leather.	The whole act.
20 Geo. 2. c. 19	Regulation of Servants and Apprentices Act 1746	An Act for the better adjusting and more easy Recovery of the Wages of certain Servants; and for the better Regulation of such Servants and of certain Apprentices, which provides for the Settlement of Disputes between Masters and Servants, and for the better Regulation of such Servants and of certain Apprentices	The whole act.
27 Geo. 2. c. 6	Stannaries (Servants and Apprentices) Act 1754	An Act to repeal a Proviso in an Act made in the Twentieth Year of His present Majesty's Reign, intituled An Act for the better adjusting and more easy Recovery of the Wages of certain Servants, and for the better Regulation of such Servants and of certain Apprentices, which provides that the said Act shall not extend to the Stannaries in Devon and Cornwall.	The whole act.
31 Geo. 2. c. 11. s. 3	Apprentices (Settlement) Act 1757	An Act to amend an Act made in the Third Year of the Reign of King William and Queen Mary, intituled An Act for the better Explanation and supplying the Defects of the former Laws for the Settlement of the Poor, so far as the same relates to Apprentices gaining a Settlement by Indenture; and also to empower Justices of the Peace to determine Differences between Masters and Mistresses and their Servants in Husbandry, touching their Wages, though such Servants are hired for less Time than a Year.	The whole act.
6 Geo. 3. c. 25	Regulation of Apprentices Act 1766	An Act for better regulating Apprentices, and Persons working under Contract.	The whole act.
17 Geo. 3. c. 56. ss. 8, 12	Frauds by Workmen Act 1777	An Act for amending and rendering more effectual the several Laws now in being, for the more effectual preventing Frauds and Abuses by Persons employed in the Manufacture of Hats, and in the Woollen, Linen, Fustian, Cotton, Iron, Leather, Fur, Hemp, Flax, Mohair, and Silk Manufactures; and also for making Provisions to prevent Frauds by Journeymen Dyers.	The whole act.
33 Geo. 3. c. 55. s. 1, 2	Parish Officers Act 1793	An Act to authorize Justices of the Peace to impose Fines upon Constables, Overseers, and other Peace or Parish Officers, for Neglect of Duty, and on Masters of Apprentices for ill-usage of such their Apprentices; and also to make Provision for the Execution of Warrants of Distress granted by Magistrates.	Except so much of sections one and two of as relates to constables, overseers, and other peace or parish officers.
39 & 40 Geo. 3. c. 77. s. 3	Collieries and Mines Act 1800	An Act for the Security of Collieries and Mines, and for the better Regulation of Colliers and Miners	The whole act.
59 Geo. 3. c. 92. ss. 5, 6	Conveyance of Offenders (Ireland) Act 1819	An Act to enable Justices of the Peace in Ireland to act as such, in certain Cases, out of the Limits of the Counties in which they actually are; to make Provision for the Execution of Warrants of Distress granted by them; and to authorize them to impose Fines upon Constables and other Officers for Neglect of Duty, and on Masters of Apprentices for ill-usage of their Apprentices.	Except so much of sections five and six of as relates to constables and other peace or parish officers.
4 Geo. 4. c. 29	Powers of Justices as to Apprenticeships Act 1823	An Act to increase the Power of Magistrates in Cases of Apprenticeship.	Except the whole act.
4 Geo. 4. c. 34	Master and Servant Act 1823	An Act to enlarge the Powers of Justices in determining Complaints between Masters and Servants, and between Masters, Apprentices, Artificers, and others.	The whole act.
10 Geo. 4. c. 52	Masters and Apprentices Act 1829	An Act to extend the Powers of an Act of the Fourth Year of His present Majesty, for enlarging the Powers of Justices in determining Complaints between Masters and Servants to Persons engaged in the Fisheries.	The whole act.
5 & 6 Vict. c. 7	Parish Apprentices Act 1842	An Act to explain the Acts for the better Regulation of certain Apprentices.	The whole act.
6 & 7 Vict. c. 40. s. 7	Hosiery Act 1843	An Act to amend the Laws for the Prevention of Frauds and Abuses by Persons employed in the Woollen, Worsted, Linen, Cotton, Flax, Mohair, and Silk Hosiery Manufactures; and for the further securing the Property of the Manufacturers and the Wages of the Workmen engaged therein.	The whole act.
14 & 15 Vict. c. 92. s. 16	Summary Jurisdiction (Ireland) Act 1851	The Summary Jurisdiction (Ireland) Act, 1851	Except sections one, two, three, and five of section sixteen relating to certain disputes between employers and the persons employed by them.

Section 17 of the act repealed 7 enactments making breaches of contract criminal, and relating to the recovery of wages by summary procedure.

Citation	Short title	Description	Extent of repeal
5 Eliz. 1. c. 4	Statute of Artificers 1562	An Act passed in the fifth year of the reign of Queen Elizabeth, chapter four, and intituled "An Act touching divers orders for artificers, labourers, servants of husbandry, and apprentices".	The whole act.
12 Geo. 1. c. 34	Woollen Manufactures Act 1725	An Act passed in the twelfth year of King George the First, chapter thirty-four, and intituled "An Act to prevent unlawful combination of workmen employed in the woollen manufactures, and for better payment of their wages".	As relates to departing from service or quitting or returning work before it is finished.
5 Geo. 3. c. 51	Cloth Manufacture, Yorkshire Act 1765	An Act passed in the fifth year of King George the Third, chapter fifty-one, the title of which begins with the words "An Act for repealing several Laws relating to the manufacture of woollen cloth in the county of York," and ends with the words "for preserving the credit of the said manufacture at the foreign market".	Section 20.
19 Geo. 3. c. 49	Payment of Lace Makers' Wages Act 1779	An Act passed in the nineteenth year of King George the Third, chapter forty-nine, and intituled "An Act to prevent abuses in the payment of wages to persons employed in the bone and thread lace manufactory".	The whole act.
3 & 4 Vict. c. 91	Textile Manufactures (Ireland) Act 1840	An Act passed in the third and fourth years of Her present Majesty, chapter ninety-one, intituled "An Act for the more effectual prevention of frauds and abuses committed by weavers, sewers, and other persons employed at the linen, hempen, union, cotton, silk, and woollen manufactures in Ireland, and for the better payment of their wages, for one year, and from thence to the end of the next session of Parliament".	Sections eighteen and twenty-three.
6 & 7 Vict. c. 40	Hosiery Act 1843	An Act passed in the session of the sixth and seventh years of Her present Majesty, chapter forty, the title of which begins with the words "An Act to amend the Laws," and ends with the words "workmen engaged therein".	Section seventeen.
8 & 9 Vict. c. 128	Silk Weavers Act 1845	An Act passed in the session of the eighth and ninth years of Her present Majesty, chapter one hundred and twenty-eight, intituled "An Act to make further regulations respecting the tickets of work to be delivered to silk weavers in certain cases".	Section seven.

== Subsequent developments ==
Sections 10, 11, 13, 19 and 20 of the act were repealed by section 1(1) of, and part X of schedule 1 to, the Statute Law (Repeals) Act 1989, which came into force on 16 November 1989.

Section 8 of the act repealed by section 1(1) of, and group 3 of part I of schedule 1 to, the Statute Law (Repeals) Act 1993, which came into force on 5 November 1993.

Sections 6 and 7 of the act were repealed for the Republic of Ireland by section 31 of, and the schedule to, the Non-Fatal Offences Against the Person Act 1997.

The whole act was repealed by section 1(1) of, and part 3 of schedule 1 to, the Statute Law (Repeals) Act 2008, which came into force on 21 July 2008.

The provisions of the Conspiracy and Protection of Property Act 1878 (38 & 39 Vict. c. 86) of South Australia, the Conspiracy and Protection of Property Act 1889 of Tasmania, and the Conspiracy and Protection of Property Act 1900 of Western Australia, were derived from the Conspiracy and Protection of Property Act 1875.

== See also ==
- Trade Union Act 1871 (34 & 35 Vict. c. 31
