= Criminal Law Amendment Act 1871 =

Act of the Parliament of the United Kingdom

- Act of Parliament
- Parliament of the United Kingdom
- Long title: An Act to amend the Criminal Law relating to Violence, Threats, and Molestation.
- Citation: 34 & 35 Vict. c. 32
- Introduced by: George Glyn MP (Commons)
- Territorial extent: United Kingdom

Dates
- Royal assent: 29 June 1871
- Commencement: 29 June 1871 (Note: The Acts of Parliament (Commencement) Act 1793.)
- Repealed: 1 September 1785
Other legislation
Amends	Offences against the Person Act 1861
Repeals/revokes	Combinations of Workmen Act 1825; Combination of Workmen Act 1859
Repealed by	Conspiracy and Protection of Property Act 1875
Relates to	Trade Union Act 1871; Employers and Workmen Act 1875

Status: Repealed

Text of statute as originally enacted

The Criminal Law Amendment Act 1871 (34 & 35 Vict. c. 32) was an act of the Parliament of the United Kingdom passed by W. E. Gladstone's Liberal Government. It was passed on the same day as the Trade Union Act 1871 (c. 31).

William Edward Hartpole Lecky described the act's implications:

...[the act] inflicted a punishment of three months' imprisonment, with hard labour, on any one who attempts to coerce another for trade purposes by the use of personal violence; by such threats as would justify a magistrate in binding a man to keep the peace; or by persistently following a person about from place to place, hiding his tools, clothes, or other property, watching and besetting his house, or following him along any street or road with two or more other persons in a disorderly manner. These last clauses were directed against the practice of picketing...

== Passage ==
Leave to bring in the Trade Unions Bill to the House of Commons was granted to the home secretary, Henry Bruce MP, the solicitor general, Sir George Jessel MP and George Shaw Lefevre MP 14 February 1871. The bill had its first reading in the House of Commons on 14 February 1871, presented by George Glyn MP. The bill had its second reading in the House of Commons on 14 March 1871 and was committed to a committee of the whole house, which met on 28 March 1871 and 30 March 1871 and reported on 30 March 1871, with amendments, which included dividing the bill into two bills — the Trades Unions Bill and the Criminal Law Amendment (Masters and Workmen) Bill. The Criminal Law Amendment (Masters and Workmen) Bill had its third reading in the House of Commons on 18 June 1871 and passed, with amendments.

The bill had its first reading in the House of Lords on 20 April 1871. The bill had its second reading in the House of Lords on 2 May 1871 and was committed to a committee of the whole house, which met and reported on 16 May 1871, with amendments. The amended bill had its third reading in the House of Lords on 19 May 1871 and passed, with amendments.

The amended bill was considered and agreed to by the House of Commons on 19 June 1871.

The bill was granted royal assent on 29 June 1871.

== Provisions ==
=== Repealed enactments ===
Section 7 of the act repealed 3 enactments, listed in the schedule to the act.

Citation	Short title	Description	Extent of repeal
6 Geo. 4. c. 129	Combinations of Workmen Act 1825	An Act to repeal the Laws relating to the Combination of Workmen, and to make other Provisions in lieu thereof.	The whole act.
22 Vict. c. 34	Combination of Workmen Act 1859	An Act to amend and explain an Act of the Sixth Year of the Reign of King George the Fourth, to repeal the Laws relating to the Combination of Workmen and to make other Provisions in lieu thereof.	The whole act.
24 & 25 Vict. c. 100	Offences against the Person Act 1861	An Act to consolidate and amend the Statute Law of England and Ireland relating to Offences against the Person.	Section forty-one.

== Subsequent developments ==
The whole act was repealed by section 17 of the Conspiracy and Protection of Property Act 1875 (38 & 39 Vict. c. 86), which came into force on 1 September 1875. The act was passed by Benjamin Disraeli's Conservative government in 1875, to legalise picketing through the Employers and Workmen Act 1875 (c. 90).

== See also ==
- Criminal Law Amendment Act
