= Divisional court =

Divisional court may refer to:

- Divisional court (England and Wales)
- Divisional Court (Ontario), a branch of the Ontario Superior Court of Justice, Canada
