= Master and Servant Act 1823 =

Act of the Parliament of the United Kingdom

- Act of Parliament
- Parliament of the United Kingdom
- Long title: An act to enlarge the Powers of Justices in determining Complaints between Masters and Servants, and between Masters, Apprentices, Artificers and others.
- Citation: 4 Geo. 4. c. 34
- Territorial extent: United Kingdom

Dates
- Royal assent: 17 June 1823
- Commencement: 17 June 1823 (Note: The Acts of Parliament (Commencement) Act 1793.)
- Repealed: 1 September 1825
Other legislation
Amended by	Summary Jurisdiction (Ireland) Act 1850
Repealed by	Conspiracy and Protection of Property Act 1875
Relates to	Combinations of Workmen Act 1825

Status: Repealed

Text of statute as originally enacted

The Master and Servant Act 1823 (4 Geo. 4. c. 34) was an act of the Parliament of the United Kingdom that sought to codify the general use of penal sanctions for breach of contract by workers against their employers.

== Subsequent developments ==
So much of the act as related to Ireland was repealed by section 60 of the Summary Jurisdiction (Ireland) Act 1850 (13 & 14 Vict. c. 102), which came into force on 1 October 1850.

The whole act was repealed by section 17 of the Conspiracy, and Protection of Property Act 1875 (38 & 39 Vict. c. 86), which came into force on 1 September 1825.

== See also ==
- Master and Servant Act
