= Royal Commission on Labour =

John Henry Whitley, Chairman of the commission

The Royal Commission on Labour (or the Whitley Commission on Labour) was a Royal Commission set up in 1929 to investigate the working conditions on plantations in India.

== The commission ==
The Commission was chaired by John Henry Whitley. The commission submitted its report in 1931. The report surprised many by concurring with the criticisms of Mahatma Gandhi and others that poverty was the cause of India's social and industrial problems. It was also critical of British employers' role in perpetuating the problems.

The Royal Commission on Labour in 1931 pointed out the need for systematic collection of labour statistics. It observed that the policy must be built on facts as the uncertainty of facts would lead to confusion and conflict regarding its aim. The Commission recommended the adoption of suitable legislation enabling the Competent Authority to collect and collate information regarding the living, working and socio-economic conditions of industrial labour.

Whitley was offered a knighthood for his work on this report, but he declined.
