= Legal abstentionism =

Policy of avoiding statutory regulation

Legal abstentionism is a term used in labour law and industrial relations to refer to the policy of a government to not regulate labour markets through statutory means, by relying heavily on minimum standards. This is said to be characteristic of the British industrial relations policy of the early and middle twentieth century. It often complements the concept of "collective laissez faire", involving regulation of work through trade unions and collective agreement.

== See also ==
- UK labour law
