= Collective laissez-faire =

Policy emphasizing trade union bargaining

Collective laissez faire is a term in legal and economic theory used to refer to the policy of a government to leave trade unions and employers free to collectively bargain with one another, with limited government intervention and oversight. It is predicated on the idea that parties of equal bargaining strength will agree to optimal solutions for economic production and as a matter of fairness.

== See also ==
- Legal abstentionism
- UK labour law
