= Trade Union Act 1871 =

Act of the Parliament of the United Kingdom

Trade Union Act 1871 (Note: Section 1.)
- Act of Parliament
- Parliament of the United Kingdom
- Long title: An Act to amend the Law relating to Trades Unions.
- Citation: 34 & 35 Vict. c. 31
- Introduced by: George Glyn MP (Commons)
- Territorial extent: United Kingdom

Dates
- Royal assent: 29 June 1871
- Commencement: 29 June 1871 (Note: The Acts of Parliament (Commencement) Act 1793.)
- Repealed: England and Wales: 28 February 1972 (Note: The Industrial Relations Act 1971 (Commencement No. 4) Order 1972 (SI 1972/36).)
Other legislation
Amended by	Statute Law Revision Act 1883; Summary Jurisdiction Act 1884; Law of Property (Amendment) Act 1924; Law of Property Act 1925; Law Reform (Miscellaneous Provisions) (Scotland) Act 1968
Repealed by	England and Wales: Industrial Relations Act 1971
Relates to	Combinations of Workmen Act 1825; Criminal Law Amendment Act 1871; Conspiracy and Protection of Property Act 1875; Trade Union and Labour Relations (Consolidation) Act 1992

Status: Partially repealed

Text of statute as originally enacted

The Trade Union Act 1871 (34 & 35 Vict. c. 31) is an act of the Parliament of the United Kingdom which greatly expanded the rights of trade unions in the United Kingdom, notably giving them the right to strike. This was one of the founding pieces of legislation in UK labour law, though it has today been superseded by the Trade Union and Labour Relations (Consolidation) Act 1992.

== Background ==
The Combinations of Workmen Act 1825 (6 Geo. 4. c. 129) had limited worker collective bargaining to matters of working hours and wages, and suppressed the right to strike.

The Conservative Prime Minister, the Earl of Derby, set up a Royal Commission on Trade Unions in 1867. One worker representative was on the commission, Frederic Harrison, who prepared union witnesses. Robert Applegarth from the Amalgamated Society of Carpenters and Joiners was a union observer of the proceedings.

The majority report of the Commission was hostile to the idea of decriminalising trade unions. Frederic Harrison, Thomas Hughes and the Earl of Lichfield produced their own minority report, recommending the following changes in the law:

- Combinations of workers should not be liable for conspiracy unless it would be criminal if committed by a single person.
- The restraint of trade doctrine in common law should not apply to trade associations.
- All existing legislation applying to unions specifically should be repealed.
- All unions should receive full legal protection of their funds.

When William Ewart Gladstone's new government came to power, the Trades Union Congress campaigned for the minority report, made under the leadership of Sir William Erle, to be adopted. It was successful.

In its passage through Parliament, Mr Bruce introduced the first reading of the bill, quoting the Minority Report.

== Passage ==
Leave to bring in the Trade Unions Bill to the House of Commons was granted to the home secretary, Henry Bruce, the solicitor general, Sir George Jessel and George Shaw Lefevre 14 February 1871. The bill had its first reading in the House of Commons on 14 February 1871, presented by George Glyn. The bill had its second reading in the House of Commons on 14 March 1871 and was committed to a committee of the whole house, which met on 28 March 1871 and 30 March 1871 and reported on 30 March 1871, with amendments, which included dividing the bill into two bills — the Trades Unions Bill and the Criminal Law Amendment (Masters and Workmen) Bill. The amended Trade Unions Bill was considered on 4 April 1871 and had its third reading in the House of Commons on 18 April 1871 and passed, without amendments.

The bill had its first reading in the House of Lords on 20 April 1871. The bill had its second reading in the House of Lords on 1 May 1871 and was committed to a committee of the whole house, which met and reported on 16 May 1871, with amendments. The amended bill had its third reading in the House of Lords on 19 May 1871 and passed, with amendments.

The amended bill was considered and agreed to by the House of Commons on 19 June 1871, with amendments. The amended bill was considered and agreed to by the House of Lords on 20 June 1871.

The bill was granted royal assent on 29 June 1871.

== Provisions ==
- Section 2 of the act provided that the purposes of trade unions should not, although possibly deemed to be in restraint of trade, be deemed unlawful to make any member liable for criminal prosecution.
- Section 3 of the act said the restraint of trade doctrine should not make any trade union agreements or trusts void or voidable.
- Section 4 of the act stated that any trade union agreements were not directly enforceable or subject to claims for damages for breach. This was designed to ensure that courts did not interfere in union affairs.
- Section 6 of the act provided a system of voluntary registration, which carried some small advantages.
- It also allowed union members to access the financial records of the union (now ss 28-30, Trade Union and Labour Relations (Consolidation) Act 1992)

== Subsequent developments ==
At the same time, the Criminal Law Amendment Act 1871 (34 & 35 Vict. c. 32) made picketing illegal, but this was repealed with the Conspiracy and Protection of Property Act 1875 (38 & 39 Vict. c. 86).

The whole act was repealed for England and Wales by section 169 of, and schedule 9 to, the Industrial Relations Act 1971, which came into force for the whole act except section 4 and 17 on 1 October 1971, for section 4 on 1 December 1971 and section 17 on 28 February 1972.

== See also ==
- Combinations of Workmen Act 1825
- Trade Disputes Act 1906
