= Employers and Workmen Act 1875 =

Act of the Parliament of the United Kingdom

Employers and Workmen Act 1875 (Note: Section 1.)
- Act of Parliament
- Parliament of the United Kingdom
- Long title: An Act to enlarge the powers of County Courts in respect of disputes between Employers and Workmen, and to give other Courts a limited civil jurisdiction in respect of such disputes.
- Citation: 38 & 39 Vict. c. 90
- Territorial extent: England and Wales; Scotland; Ireland; (Note: Sections 14 and 15.)

Dates
- Royal assent: 13 August 1875
- Commencement: 1 September 1875, except so far as the act authorised any thing to be done at any time after 13 August 1875 (Note: Section 2.)
- Repealed: Great Britain: 18 July 1973
Other legislation
Amended by	Justices of the Peace Act 1949; Administration of Justice Act 1956; Family Law Reform Act 1969
Repealed by	Great Britain: Statute Law (Repeals) Act 1973
Relates to	Conspiracy, and Protection of Property Act 1875

Status: Repealed

Text of statute as originally enacted

The Employers and Workmen Act 1875 (38 & 39 Vict. c. 90) was an act of the Parliament of the United Kingdom, relating to labour relations, which together with the Conspiracy and Protection of Property Act 1875 (c. 86), fully decriminalised the work of trade unions. Based on an extension of the conclusions of the Cockburn Commission, it was introduced by a Conservative government under Benjamin Disraeli's second administration.

The act extended to Ireland, which at that time was part of the United Kingdom.

== Background ==
The act purported to place both sides of industry in equal footing allowing all breaches of contract to be covered by civil law. Prior to the act, employers were subjected to civil law which could result in a fine while employees could be subjected to criminal law which may have led to a fine and imprisonment. Disraeli proudly commented, "We have settled the long and vexatious contest between capital and labour" and hoped this would "gain and retain for the Conservatives the lasting affection of the working classes".

== Provisions ==
Section 3(3) of the act was interpreted by the courts to allow an award of specific performance for completion of work.

Section 4 of the act was interpreted to mean that a worker who was absent from work could be prosecuted and pay damages to his employer (even if the employer could not show a monetary loss on ordinary principles).

Section 15 of the act noted that in Ireland, the senior judicial officer was the Lord Chancellor of Ireland and the county courts in Ireland were known as the Civil Bill Courts.

=== Short title, commencement and extent ===
Section 1 of the act provided that the act may be cited as the Employers and Workmen Act 1875.

Section 2 of the act provided that the act would come into force on 1 September 1875, except so far as the act authorised any thing to be done at any time after 13 August 1875.

== Subsequent developments ==
The whole act was repealed for Great Britain by section 1(1) of, and part XIII of schedule 1 to, the Statute Law (Repeals) Act 1973, which came into force on 18 July 1973.

In section 9 of the act, the words from "and no goods" to "by a county court" were repealed by section 57(2) of, and the second schedule to, the Administration of Justice Act 1956 (4 & 5 Eliz. 2. c. 46), which came into force on 1 October 1957.

== See also ==
- UK labour law
- Conspiracy, and Protection of Property Act 1875
- Nokes v Doncaster Amalgamated Collieries Ltd [1940] AC 1014

== Bibliography ==
- Thomas James Arnold. The Conspiracy and Protection of Property Act, 1875 (38 & 39 Vict. c. 86), and the Employers and Workmen Act, 1875 (38 & 39 Vict. c. 90). Shaw & Sons. Fetter Lane and Crane Court, London. 1876. Google Books.
- George Howell. A Handy-Book of the Labour Laws. Third Edition, Revised. Macmillan & Co. London (and New York). 1895. Chapters 1 to 3. Pages 1 to 36.
