= Electoral Disabilities (Military Service) Removal Act 1900 =

Act of the Parliament of the United Kingdom

Electoral Disabilities (Military Service) Removal Act 1900 (Note: Section 2.)
- Act of Parliament
- Parliament of the United Kingdom
- Long title: An Act to remove Electoral Disabilities which may arise in the case of Members of the Reserve, Militia, and Yeomanry Forces, and in the case of Volunteers, by reason of absence on the Military Service of the Crown.
- Citation: 63 & 64 Vict. c. 8
- Territorial extent: United Kingdom

Dates
- Royal assent: 25 May 1900
- Commencement: 25 May 1900 (Note: The Acts of Parliament (Commencement) Act 1793.)
- Repealed: 21 December 1908
Other legislation
Repealed by	Statute Law Revision Act 1908

Status: Repealed

Text of statute as originally enacted

The Electoral Disabilities (Military Service) Removal Act 1900 (63 & 64 Vict. c. 8) was an act of the Parliament of the United Kingdom, given royal assent on 25 May 1900 and repealed in 1908.

It held that any person on active service as part of the reserves, volunteers, yeomanry or militia, and as a result not fulfilling the residency requirement for electoral registration, was not to be disqualified from registration for this reason alone. It also provided that they were not to be disqualified if their wife or their children had received poor relief during such an absence.

The act was specifically stipulated to only apply during the duration of the South African War, though it applied to any absence on active service, whether overseas or on service within the United Kingdom. "Volunteer" applied generally, to any person enlisted for temporary service for the purposes of the war.

== Subsequent developments ==
The whole act was repealed by section 1 of, and the schedule to, the Statute Law Revision Act 1908 (8 Edw. 7. c. 49), which came into force on 21 December 1908.
