= List of acts of the Parliament of Western Australia from 1901 =

This is a list of acts of the Parliament of Western Australia for the year 1901.

== 1901 ==
Short title, or popular name	Citation	Royal assent
Long title
	1 Edw. VII. No. 1	15 July 1901
An Act to apply out of the Consolidated Revenue Fund and from Moneys to Credit of the General Loan Fund the sum of One Million Two Hundred and Fifty Thousand Pounds (Note: £1,250,000 in 1901 is equivalent to A$215,300,000 in 2022.) to the Service of the Year ending 30th June, 1902.
Loan Act 1901	1 Edw. VII. No. 2	2 August 1901
An Act to authorise the raising of a sum of Two million six hundred thousand Pounds (Note: £2,600,000 in 1901 is equivalent to A$447,900,000 in 2022.) by Loan for the construction of certain Public Works, and other purposes.
	1 Edw. VII. No. 3	9 October 1901
An Act to impose certain Customs Duties in accordance with the provisions of the Commonwealth of Australia Constitution Act. (Note: Commonwealth of Australia Constitution Act 1900 (63 & 64 Vict. c. 12 (Imp)))
Presbyterian Church of Australia Act 1901	1 Edw. VII. No. 4	9 October 1901
An Act to enable certain arrangements entered into by and on behalf of the Presbyterian Churches of New South Wales, Queensland, South Australia, Tasmania, Victoria, and Western Australia for constituting one Presbyterian Church of Australia, to be carried into effect, and to make provision with regard to the property held by, or on behalf of, or in connection with, the Presbyterian Church in Western Australia, or by any Congregation or body connected therewith, or by any person for or on behalf of the said Church, or any Congregation of the said Church, and for other purposes in connection with such Church.
	1 Edw. VII. No. 5	18 November 1901
An Act to apply out of the Consolidated Revenue Fund and from Moneys to Credit of the General Loan Fund a further sum of Five Hundred Thousand Pounds (Note: £500,000 in 1901 is equivalent to A$86,100,000 in 2022.) to the Service of the Year ending 30th June, 1902.
	1 Edw. VII. No. 6	18 December 1901
An Act to apply out of the Consolidated Revenue Fund and from Moneys to Credit of the General Loan Fund a further sum of Six Hundred Thousand Pounds (Note: £600,000 in 1901 is equivalent to A$103,400,000 in 2022.) to the Service of the Year ending 30th June, 1902.

== Sources ==
- "legislation.wa.gov.au".
