= Berwick-upon-Tweed Power Station =

Demolished coal-fired power station in North East England

- Country: England
- Location: Berwick-upon-Tweed
- Coordinates: 55.766743°N 2.004755°W
- Status: Decommissioned
- Construction began: 1900
- Commission date: 1903
- Decommission date: 1940s
- Owners: Urban Electric Supply Company Limited, Scottish Southern Electric Supply Company Limited
- Operator: as owner

Thermal power station
- Primary fuel: Coal

Berwick Power Station was a small coal-fired power station situated at the mouth of the River Tweed, at Berwick-upon-Tweed in Northumberland, North East England. It operated from 1903 until the early 1940s.

== History ==
An electric lighting order was granted to the borough of Berwick-upon-Tweed in 1900, the Berwick-upon-Tweed Electric Lighting Order 1900, confirmed by Parliament in the Electric Lighting Orders Confirmation (No. 7) Act 1900 (63 & 64 Vict. c. clxvii). Supplies of electricity started on 26 September 1903. By 1915 the plant comprised three boilers, two Belliss engines coupled directly to three Crompton dynamos. There was a 400 Amp-hour battery to maintain supplies. The total plant capacity was 180 kW. In the year ended 31 December 1912 a total of 286.68 MWh was sold to 354 customers.

In the early 1920s the Berwick-upon-Tweed electricity undertaking was operated as part of the Urban Electric Supply Company Limited. The latter company operated electricity undertakings in Caterham, Cambourne, Dartmouth & Kingswear, Glossop, Godalming, Grantham, Illogan, Newbury, Newton Abbot, Redruth, Stamford, Weybridge and Woking.

In 1923 the plant at Berwick-upon-Tweed comprised three 90 kW and one 200 kW reciprocating engines driving electricity generators. The machines were supplied with up to 22,000 lb/hr (9,979 kg/hr) of steam. The generators operated at 500 Volts and supplied Direct Current at 240 and 480 Volts to consumers. In 1923 the plant generated 539.447 GWh, the maximum load was 330 MW and there were 1,673 connections on the system. The undertaking sold 423,000 kWh which generated an income of £10,338. After deduction of expense there was a profit of £5,083.

The station was constructed in the 1930s. The station's main building, which consisted of a boiler house and turbine hall, stood at two stories tall. The station was designed to fit in with the town walls, and so constructed in stone. The main building was a triple gabled building, with irregular windows. It had frontage onto the river for easy access to condensing water and coal delivery.

In 1937 the power station was owned by the Scottish Southern Electric Supply Company Limited. The plant comprised four boilers with a total steam output of 22,000 lb/hr. Three 90kW and one 200kW reciprocating engines. These generated 700.04 MWh, the majority of electric power was imported, the total sold was 2,337 MWh to 1,758 customers. The financial gross surplus was £5,264.

The Berwick-on-Tweed power station had been decommissioned by 1946 as it does not appear in a list of British power stations.

After ceasing to generate electricity, the generating equipment was removed and the building was used as a storehouse. The building was eventually demolished in the late 1990s.
