= List of acts of the Parliament of the United Kingdom from 1900 =

This is a complete list of acts of the Parliament of the United Kingdom for the year 1900.

Note that the first parliament of the United Kingdom was held in 1801; parliaments between 1707 and 1800 were either parliaments of Great Britain or of Ireland). For acts passed up until 1707, see the list of acts of the Parliament of England and the list of acts of the Parliament of Scotland. For acts passed from 1707 to 1800, see the list of acts of the Parliament of Great Britain. See also the list of acts of the Parliament of Ireland.

For acts of the devolved parliaments and assemblies in the United Kingdom, see the list of acts of the Scottish Parliament, the list of acts of the Northern Ireland Assembly, and the list of acts and measures of Senedd Cymru; see also the list of acts of the Parliament of Northern Ireland.

The number shown after each act's title is its chapter number. Acts passed before 1963 are cited using this number, preceded by the year(s) of the reign during which the relevant parliamentary session was held; thus the Union with Ireland Act 1800 is cited as "39 & 40 Geo. 3. c. 67", meaning the 67th act passed during the session that started in the 39th year of the reign of George III and which finished in the 40th year of that reign. Note that the modern convention is to use Arabic numerals in citations (thus "41 Geo. 3" rather than "41 Geo. III"). Acts of the last session of the Parliament of Great Britain and the first session of the Parliament of the United Kingdom are both cited as "41 Geo. 3". Acts passed from 1963 onwards are simply cited by calendar year and chapter number.

== 63 & 64 Vict. ==
The seventh session of the 26th Parliament of the United Kingdom, which met from 30 January 1900 until 8 August 1900.

=== Public general acts ===
Short title	Citation	Royal assent
Long title
Consolidated Fund (No. 1) Act 1900 (repealed)	63 & 64 Vict. c. 1	23 February 1900
An Act to apply a sum out of the Consolidated Fund to the service of the year ending on the thirty-first day of March one thousand nine hundred. (Repealed by Statute Law Revision Act 1908 (8 Edw. 7. c. 49))
War Loan Act 1900 (repealed)	63 & 64 Vict. c. 2	27 March 1900
An Act to provide for raising Money for the present War in South Africa. (Repealed by Finance Act 1903 (3 Edw. 7. c. 8), Forgery Act 1913 (3 & 4 Geo. 5. c. 27) and Statute Law Revision Act 1950 (14 Geo. 6. c. 6))
Consolidated Fund (No. 2) Act 1900 (repealed)	63 & 64 Vict. c. 3	27 March 1900
An Act to apply certain sums out of the Consolidated Fund to the service of the years ending on the thirty-first day of March one thousand eight hundred and ninety-nine, one thousand nine hundred, and one thousand nine hundred and one. (Repealed by Statute Law Revision Act 1908 (8 Edw. 7. c. 49))
Census (Great Britain) Act 1900 (repealed)	63 & 64 Vict. c. 4	27 March 1900
An Act for taking the Census for Great Britain in the year one thousand nine hundred and one. (Repealed by Statute Law Revision Act 1908 (8 Edw. 7. c. 49) and Statute Law Revision Act 1950 (14 Geo. 6. c. 6))
Army (Annual) Act 1900 (repealed)	63 & 64 Vict. c. 5	9 April 1900
An Act to provide, during Twelve Months, for the Discipline and Regulation of the Army. (Repealed by Statute Law Revision Act 1908 (8 Edw. 7. c. 49) and Revision of the Army and Air Force Acts (Transitional Provisions) Act 1955 (3 & 4 Eliz. 2. c. 20))
Census (Ireland) Act 1900 (repealed)	63 & 64 Vict. c. 6	9 April 1900
An Act for taking the Census for Ireland in the year one thousand nine hundred and one. (Repealed by Statute Law Revision Act 1908 (8 Edw. 7. c. 49) and Statute Law Revision Act (Northern Ireland) 1954 (c. 35 (N.I.)))
Finance Act 1900 (repealed)	63 & 64 Vict. c. 7	9 April 1900
An Act to grant certain duties of Customs and Inland Revenue, to alter other duties, and to amend the Law relating to Customs and Inland Revenue and the National Debt, and to make other provision for the financial arrangements of the year. (Repealed by Finance Act 1901 (1 Edw. 7. c. 7), Statute Law Revision Act 1908 (8 Edw. 7. c. 49), Finance (1909-10) Act 1910 (10 Edw. 7 & 1 Geo. 5. c. 8), Finance Act 1918 (8 & 9 Geo. 5. c. 15), Finance Act 1940 (3 & 4 Geo. 6. c. 29), Finance Act 1952 (15 & 16 Geo. 6 & 1 Eliz. 2. c. 33), Customs and Excise Act 1952 (15 & 16 Geo. 6 & 1 Eliz. 2. c. 44), Finance Act 1969 (c. 32) and Finance Act 1975 (c. 7))
Electoral Disabilities (Military Service) Removal Act 1900 (repealed)	63 & 64 Vict. c. 8	25 May 1900
An Act to remove Electoral Disabilities which may arise in the case of Members of the Reserve, Militia, and Yeomanry Forces, and in the case of Volunteers, by reason of absence on the Military Service of the Crown. (Repealed by Statute Law Revision Act 1908 (8 Edw. 7. c. 49))
Police Reservists (Allowances) Act 1900 (repealed)	63 & 64 Vict. c. 9	25 May 1900
An Act to authorise the grant out of Police Funds of certain Allowances and Gratuities in respect of Police Reservists who are called out on Permanent Service. (Repealed by Statute Law Revision Act 1908 (8 Edw. 7. c. 49))
Public Health (Ireland) Act 1900 (repealed)	63 & 64 Vict. c. 10	25 June 1900
An Act to remove doubts respecting the powers of the Local Government Board for Ireland for determining the Area on which certain Expenses are to be chargeable. (Repealed by Rates (Northern Ireland) Order 1972 (SI 1972/1633 (N.I. 16)))
Uganda Railway Act 1900 (repealed)	63 & 64 Vict. c. 11	25 June 1900
An Act to provide further Money for the Uganda Railway. (Repealed by Uganda Railway Act 1902 (2 Edw. 7. c. 40))
Commonwealth of Australia Constitution Act 1900 (Note: Note that the short title as given in the act itself omits the year. The title pronounced in the Lords at royal assent included the year.)	63 & 64 Vict. c. 12	9 July 1900
An Act to constitute the Commonwealth of Australia.
County Councils (Elections) Amendment Act 1900 (repealed)	63 & 64 Vict. c. 13	10 July 1900
An Act to amend the County Councils (Elections) Act, 1891. (Note: County Councils (Elections) Act 1891 (54 & 55 Vict. c. 68)) (Repealed by Local Government Act 1933 (23 & 24 Geo. 5. c. 51) and London Government Act 1939 (2 & 3 Geo. 6. c. 40))
Colonial Solicitors Act 1900	63 & 64 Vict. c. 14	10 July 1900
An Act to provide for the admission of Solicitors of Courts of British Possessions to the Supreme Courts in the United Kingdom. (Repealed for England and Wales by Solicitors Act 1932 (22 & 23 Geo. 5. c. 37) and for Northern Ireland by Law Reform (Miscellaneous Provisions) (Northern Ireland) Order 2005 (SI 2005/1452 (N.I. 7)))
Burial Act 1900 (repealed)	63 & 64 Vict. c. 15	10 July 1900
An Act to amend the Law relating to Burial Grounds. (Repealed by Statute Law (Repeals) Act 1978 (c. 45))
District Councillors and Guardians (Term of Office) Act 1900 (repealed)	63 & 64 Vict. c. 16	10 July 1900
An Act to make further provision for the Term of Office of District Councillors and Guardians. (Repealed by Local Government Act 1933 (23 & 24 Geo. 5. c. 51))
Naval Reserve (Mobilisation) Act 1900 (repealed)	63 & 64 Vict. c. 17	10 July 1900
An Act to amend the Royal Naval Reserve (Volunteer) Act, 1896, (Note: Royal Naval Reserve (Volunteer) Act 1896 (59 & 60 Vict. c. 33)) in relation to calling out the Volunteers for Actual Service. (Repealed by Reserve Forces Act 1966 (c. 30))
County Surveyors (Ireland) Act 1900 (repealed)	63 & 64 Vict. c. 18	10 July 1900
An Act to amend the County Surveyors (Ireland) Act, 1862. (Note: County Surveyors (Ireland) Act 1862 (25 & 26 Vict. c. 106)) (Repealed by Statute Law Revision Act 1908 (8 Edw. 7. c. 49) and Statute Law Revision Act (Northern Ireland) 1954 (c. 35 (N.I.)))
Land Registry (New Buildings) Act 1900	63 & 64 Vict. c. 19	30 July 1900
An Act for the acquisition of Property for building a new Land Registry Office and other Public Offices in London, and for purposes connected therewith.
Ecclesiastical Assessments (Scotland) Act 1900 (repealed)	63 & 64 Vict. c. 20	30 July 1900
An Act to amend the Law regarding Ecclesiastical Assessments in Scotland. (Repealed by Abolition of Feudal Tenure etc. (Scotland) Act 2000 (asp 5))
Mines (Prohibition of Child Labour Underground) Act 1900 (repealed)	63 & 64 Vict. c. 21	30 July 1900
An Act to prohibit Child Labour Underground in Mines. (Repealed for England and Wales and Scotland by Mines and Quarries Act 1954 (2 & 3 Eliz. 2. c. 70) and for Northern Ireland by Mines Act (Northern Ireland) 1969 (c. 6 (N.I.)))
Workmen's Compensation Act 1900 (repealed)	63 & 64 Vict. c. 22	30 July 1900
An Act to extend the benefits of the Workmen's Compensation Act, 1897, (Note: Workmen's Compensation Act 1897 (60 & 61 Vict. c. 37)) to Workmen in Agriculture. (Repealed by Workmen's Compensation Act 1906 (6 Edw. 7. c. 58))
Poor Removal Act 1900 (repealed)	63 & 64 Vict. c. 23	30 July 1900
An Act to amend the Law relating to the Removal of Paupers from England to Ireland. (Repealed for England and Wales and Scotland by National Assistance Act 1948 (11 & 12 Geo. 6. c. 29) and for Northern Ireland by Statute Law Revision Act (Northern Ireland) 1954 (c. 35 (N.I.)))
Veterinary Surgeons Amendment Act 1900 (repealed)	63 & 64 Vict. c. 24	30 July 1900
An Act to further amend the Law relating to Veterinary Surgeons. (Repealed by Statute Law Revision Act 1963 (c. 30))
Charitable Loan Societies (Ireland) Act 1900 (repealed)	63 & 64 Vict. c. 25	30 July 1900
An Act to amend the Charitable Loan Societies (Ireland) Act, 1843. (Note: Charitable Loan Societies (Ireland) Act 1843 (6 & 7 Vict. c. 91)) (Repealed by Finance (Miscellaneous Provisions) Act (Northern Ireland) 1955 (c. 19 (N.I.)))
Land Charges Act 1900 (repealed)	63 & 64 Vict. c. 26	30 July 1900
An Act to amend the Law relating to Charges on Land and to matters connected therewith. (Repealed by Land Charges Act 1925 (15 & 16 Geo. 5. c. 22))
Railway Employment (Prevention of Accidents) Act 1900	63 & 64 Vict. c. 27	30 July 1900
An Act for the better Prevention of Accidents on Railways. (Repealed for England and Wales and Scotland by Railway Safety (Miscellaneous Provisions) Regulations 1997 (SI 1997/553))
Inebriates Amendment (Scotland) Act 1900 (repealed)	63 & 64 Vict. c. 28	30 July 1900
An Act to amend the Inebriates Acts, 1879 to 1899, for Scotland. (Repealed by Statute Law (Repeals) Act 1976 (c. 16))
London County Council Electors Qualification Act 1900 (repealed)	63 & 64 Vict. c. 29	30 July 1900
An Act to assimilate the County Council and Borough Council Franchise in London. (Repealed by Representation of the People Act 1918 (7 & 8 Geo. 5. c. 64))
Beer Retailers' and Spirit Grocers' Retail Licences (Ireland) Act 1900 (repealed)	63 & 64 Vict. c. 30	30 July 1900
An Act to amend the Laws relating to Beer Retailers’ and Spirit Grocers’ Licences in Ireland. (Repealed by Licensing Act (Northern Ireland) 1971 (c. 13 (N.I.)))
Isle of Man (Customs) Act 1900 (repealed)	63 & 64 Vict. c. 31	6 August 1900
An Act to amend the Law with respect to the Customs Duties in the Isle of Man. (Repealed by Isle of Man (Customs) (No. 2) Act 1932 (22 & 23 Geo. 5. c. 41))
Merchant Shipping (Liability of Shipowners and others) Act 1900	63 & 64 Vict. c. 32	6 August 1900
An Act to amend the Merchant Shipping Act, 1894, (Note: Merchant Shipping Act 1894 (57 & 58 Vict. c. 60)) with respect to the Liability of Shipowners and others.
Wild Animals in Captivity Protection Act 1900 (repealed)	63 & 64 Vict. c. 33	6 August 1900
An Act for the prevention of cruelty to wild animals in captivity. (Repealed for England and Wales and Ireland by Protection of Animals Act 1911 (1 & 2 Geo. 5. c. 27) and for Scotland by Protection of Animals (Scotland) Act 1912 (2 & 3 Geo. 5. c. 14))
Ancient Monuments Protection Act 1900 (repealed)	63 & 64 Vict. c. 34	6 August 1900
An Act to amend the Ancient Monuments Protection Act, 1882. (Note: Ancient Monuments Protection Act 1882 (45 & 46 Vict. c. 73)) (Repealed for England and Wales and Scotland by Ancient Monuments Consolidation and Amendment Act 1913 (3 & 4 Geo. 5. c. 32) and for Northern Ireland by Ancient Monuments Act (Northern Ireland) 1926 (16 & 17 Geo. 5. c. 12 (N.I.)))
Oil in Tobacco Act 1900 (repealed)	63 & 64 Vict. c. 35	6 August 1900
An Act to restrict the amount of Oil in manufactured Tobacco. (Repealed by Customs and Excise Act 1952 (15 & 16 Geo. 6 & 1 Eliz. 2. c. 44))
Public Works Loans Act 1900	63 & 64 Vict. c. 36	6 August 1900
An Act to grant Money for the purpose of certain Local Loans out of the Local Loans Fund, and for other purposes relating to Local Loans.
Expiring Laws Continuance Act 1900 (repealed)	63 & 64 Vict. c. 37	6 August 1900
An Act to continue various Expiring Laws. (Repealed by Statute Law Revision Act 1908 (8 Edw. 7. c. 49))
Elementary School Teachers Superannuation (Isle of Man) Act 1900 (repealed)	63 & 64 Vict. c. 38	6 August 1900
An Act to extend the Elementary School Teachers (Superannuation) Act, 1898, (Note: Elementary School Teachers (Superannuation) Act 1898 (61 & 62 Vict. c. 57)) to Teachers serving in the Isle of Man, and to service as a Teacher in that Island. (Repealed by Statute Law (Repeals) Act 1977 (c. 18))
Volunteer Act 1900 (repealed)	63 & 64 Vict. c. 39	6 August 1900
An Act to amend the Volunteer Act, 1863. (Note: Volunteer Act 1863 (26 & 27 Vict. c. 65)) (Repealed by Statute Law Revision Act 1966 (c. 5))
Elementary School Teachers Superannuation (Jersey) Act 1900	63 & 64 Vict. c. 40	6 August 1900
An Act to extend the Elementary School Teachers (Superannuation) Act, 1898, to Teachers serving in the Island of Jersey, and to service as a Teacher in that Island.
Local Government (Ireland) (No. 2) Act 1900 (repealed)	63 & 64 Vict. c. 41	6 August 1900
An Act to provide for the alteration of the Local Government (Procedure of Councils) Order, 1899. (Note: Local Government (Procedure of Councils) Order 1899 (SR&O 1899/43)) (Repealed by Local Government (Roads) Act (Northern Ireland) 1923 (13 & 14 Geo. 5. c. 10 (N.I.)))
Reserve Forces Act 1900 (repealed)	63 & 64 Vict. c. 42	6 August 1900
An Act to amend the Reserve Forces Act, 1882. (Note: Reserve Forces Act 1882 (45 & 46 Vict. c. 48)) (Repealed by Territorial Army and Militia Act 1921 (11 & 12 Geo. 5. c. 37) and Army Reserve Act 1950 (14 Geo. 6. c. 32))
Intermediate Education (Ireland) Act 1900 (repealed)	63 & 64 Vict. c. 43	6 August 1900
An Act to amend the Law relating to Intermediate Education in Ireland. (Repealed by Education Act (Northern Ireland) 1923 (13 & 14 Geo. 5. c. 21 (N.I.)))
Exportation of Arms Act 1900 (repealed)	63 & 64 Vict. c. 44	6 August 1900
An Act to amend the Law relating to the Exportation of Arms, Ammunition, and Military and Naval Stores. (Repealed by Statute Law (Repeals) Act 1986 (c. 12))
Poor Relief (Ireland) Act 1900 (repealed)	63 & 64 Vict. c. 45	6 August 1900
An Act to amend the Poor Relief (Ireland) Acts, 1838 to 1892, with respect to relief given by the maintenance of Lunatics and Children, and with respect to the quantity of Land which may be acquired under those Acts. (Repealed by Welfare Services Act (Northern Ireland) 1949 (c. 1 (N.I.)) and Children and Young Persons Act (Northern Ireland) 1950 (c. 5 (N.I.)))
Members of Local Authorities Relief Act 1900 (repealed)	63 & 64 Vict. c. 46	6 August 1900
An Act to relieve Members of County Councils and other Local Authorities from disqualification by reason of absence in certain cases. (Repealed for England and Wales by Local Government Act 1933 (23 & 24 Geo. 5. c. 51) and London County Council (General Powers) Act 1934 (24 & 25 Geo. 5. c. xl) and for Northern Ireland by Local Government (Members and Officers) Act (Northern Ireland) 1964 (c. 14 (N.I.)))
County Courts (Investment) Act 1900 (repealed)	63 & 64 Vict. c. 47	8 August 1900
An Act to amend the Law with regard to the investment of Money paid into a County Court. (Repealed by County Courts (Amendment) Act 1934 (24 & 25 Geo. 5. c. 17))
Companies Act 1900 (repealed)	63 & 64 Vict. c. 48	8 August 1900
An Act to amend the Companies Acts. (Repealed by Companies (Consolidation) Act 1908 (8 Edw. 7. c. 69))
Town Councils (Scotland) Act 1900 (repealed)	63 & 64 Vict. c. 49	8 August 1900
An Act to consolidate and amend the Law relating to the Election and Proceedings of Town Councils in Scotland. (Repealed by Local Government (Scotland) Act 1973 (c. 65))
Agricultural Holdings Act 1900 (repealed)	63 & 64 Vict. c. 50	8 August 1900
An Act to amend the Law relating to Agricultural Holdings. (Repealed by Agricultural Holdings Act 1908 (8 Edw. 7. c. 28) and Agricultural Holdings (Scotland) Act 1908 (8 Edw. 7. c. 64))
Money-lenders Act 1900 (repealed)	63 & 64 Vict. c. 51	8 August 1900
An Act to amend the Law with respect to Persons carrying on business as Money-lenders. (Repealed by Consumer Credit Act 1974 (c. 39))
Naval Reserve Act 1900 (repealed)	63 & 64 Vict. c. 52	8 August 1900
An Act to make further provision for a Naval Reserve. (Repealed by Reserve Forces Act 1980 (c. 9))
Elementary Education Act 1900 (repealed)	63 & 64 Vict. c. 53	8 August 1900
An Act to amend the Elementary Education Acts, 1870 to 1893. (Repealed by Education Act 1921 (11 & 12 Geo. 5. c. 51))
Lunacy Board (Scotland) Salaries and Clerks Act 1900 (repealed)	63 & 64 Vict. c. 54	8 August 1900
An Act to amend the Law relating to the number and salaries of the Staff of the General Board of Commissioners in Lunacy for Scotland, and to provide for the remuneration of certain of the Commissioners. (Repealed by Mental Health (Scotland) Act 1960 (8 & 9 Eliz. 2. c. 61))
Executors (Scotland) Act 1900	63 & 64 Vict. c. 55	8 August 1900
An Act to amend the Law relating to Executors in Scotland.
Military Lands Act 1900	63 & 64 Vict. c. 56	8 August 1900
An Act to amend the Military Lands Act, 1892. (Note: Military Lands Act 1892 (55 & 56 Vict. c. 43)) (Repealed for the Isle of Man by Statute Law Revision (Isle of Man) Act 1991 (c. 61))
Appropriation Act 1900 (repealed)	63 & 64 Vict. c. 57	8 August 1900
An Act to apply a sum out of the Consolidated Fund to the service of the year ending on the thirty-first day of March one thousand nine hundred and one, and to appropriate the Supplies granted in this Session of Parliament. (Repealed by Statute Law Revision Act 1908 (8 Edw. 7. c. 49))
Tithe Rentcharge (Ireland) Act 1900	63 & 64 Vict. c. 58	8 August 1900
An Act to amend the Law relating to Tithe Rentcharge in Ireland.
Housing of the Working Classes Act 1900 (repealed)	63 & 64 Vict. c. 59	8 August 1900
An Act to amend Part III. of the Housing of the Working Classes Act, 1890. (Note: Housing of the Working Classes Act 1890 (53 & 54 Vict. c. 70)) (Repealed by Statute Law Revision Act 1908 (8 Edw. 7. c. 49), Housing, Town Planning, etc. Act 1909 (9 Edw. 7. c. 44), Housing, Town Planning, &c. Act 1919 (9 & 10 Geo. 5. c. 35), Housing, Town Planning, etc. (Scotland) Act 1919 (9 & 10 Geo. 5. c. 60), Housing Act 1925 (15 & 16 Geo. 5. c. 14) and Housing (Scotland) Act 1925 (15 & 16 Geo. 5. c. 15))
Tramways (Ireland) Act 1900	63 & 64 Vict. c. 60	8 August 1900
An Act to amend the Tramways (Ireland) Acts, 1860 to 1896.
Supplemental War Loan Act 1900 (repealed)	63 & 64 Vict. c. 61	8 August 1900
An Act to provide for raising a Supplemental Loan for the Service of the Year ending the thirty-first day of March nineteen hundred and one. (Repealed by Statute Law Revision Act 1950 (14 Geo. 6. c. 6))
Colonial Stock Act 1900 (repealed)	63 & 64 Vict. c. 62	8 August 1900
An Act to amend the Colonial Stock Acts, 1877 (Note: Colonial Stock Act 1877 (40 & 41 Vict. c. 59)) and 1892, (Note: Colonial Stock Act 1892 (55 & 56 Vict. c. 35)) and the Trustee Act, 1893. (Note: Trustee Act 1893 (56 & 57 Vict. c. 53)) (Repealed by Statute Law (Repeals) Act 1977 (c. 18))
Local Government (Ireland) Act 1900 (repealed)	63 & 64 Vict. c. 63	8 August 1900
An Act to amend sections forty-two, fifty-one, fifty-four, sixty-nine, one hundred and three, one hundred and fifteen, and one hundred and twenty-one of the Local Government (Ireland) Act, 1898, (Note: Local Government (Ireland) Act 1898 (61 & 62 Vict. c. 37)) and Articles nineteen, twenty-four, and thirty-six of the Schedule to the Local Government (Application of Enactments) Order, 1898. (Note: Local Government (Application of Enactments) Order 1898 (SR&O 1899/1120)) (Repealed by Statute Law Revision (Northern Ireland) Act 1980 (c. 59))

=== Local acts ===
Short title	Citation	Royal assent
Long title
Military Lands Provisional Order Confirmation Act 1900 (repealed)	63 & 64 Vict. c. i	9 April 1900
An Act to confirm a Provisional Order of the Secretary of State under the Military Lands Act 1892. (Note: Military Lands Act 1892 (55 & 56 Vict. c. 43)) (Repealed by Statute Law (Repeals) Act 2008 (c. 12))
Colonial Bank Act 1900 (repealed)	63 & 64 Vict. c. ii	9 April 1900
An Act to increase the limit of the Note issue of the Colonial Bank and for other purposes. (Repealed by Colonial Bank Act 1925 (15 & 16 Geo. 5. c. cvi))
Universal Life Assurance Society Act 1900	63 & 64 Vict. c. iii	25 May 1900
An Act to explain vary or alter the Deed of Settlement of the Universal Life Assurance Society and for other purposes.
Pontefract Park (Poor Rate) Act 1900 (repealed)	63 & 64 Vict. c. iv	25 May 1900
An Act for regulating the rating of Pontefract Park in the west riding of the County of York in respect of poor rates and for other purposes. (Repealed by West Yorkshire Act 1980 (c. xiv))
City and South London Railway Act 1900	63 & 64 Vict. c. v	25 May 1900
An Act to amend the City and South London Railway Acts 1893 (Note: City and South London Railway Act 1893 (56 & 57 Vict. c. ccvii)) and 1898. (Note: City and South London Railway Act 1898 (61 & 62 Vict. c. xi))
Cheshire Lines Act 1900	63 & 64 Vict. c. vi	25 May 1900
An Act to enable the Cheshire Lines Committee to make a new railway to acquire additional lands to stop up certain streets and for other purposes.
Scottish Widows' Fund and Life Assurance Society's Act 1900 (repealed)	63 & 64 Vict. c. vii	25 May 1900
An Act to confer further powers on the Scottish Widows' Fund and Life Assurance Society and the Directors thereof to amend the Acts relating to the Society and for other purposes. (Repealed by Scottish Widows' Fund and Life Assurance Society's Act 1926 (16 & 17 Geo. 5. c. lxxviii))
Redhill Gas Act 1900	63 & 64 Vict. c. viii	25 May 1900
An Act to confer further powers upon the Redhill Gas Company and for other purposes.
Rugeley Gas Act 1900	63 & 64 Vict. c. ix	25 May 1900
An Act for incorporating and conferring powers upon the Rugeley Gas Company and for other purposes.
Charing Cross, Euston and Hampstead Railway Act 1900	63 & 64 Vict. c. x	25 May 1900
An Act to extend the powers of the Charing Cross Euston and Hampstead Railway Company and for other purposes.
Uralite Patent Act 1900	63 & 64 Vict. c. xi	25 May 1900
An Act for rendering valid certain Letters Patent granted to Alexander Imschenetzky for an Invention for manufacture of fireproof and insulating compounds known as Uralite.
Kingston-upon-Thames Corporation Act 1900 (repealed)	63 & 64 Vict. c. xii	25 May 1900
An Act to confer further powers upon the Mayor Aldermen and Burgesses of the borough of Kingston-upon-Thames and for other purposes. (Repealed by Local Law (South West London Boroughs) Order 1965 (SI 1965/532))
Newport (Monmouthshire) Gas Act 1900	63 & 64 Vict. c. xiii	25 May 1900
An Act to authorise the Newport (Monmouthshire) Gas Company to extend their limits for the supply of gas to consolidate and increase their capital and for other purposes.
Grantham Gas Act 1900	63 & 64 Vict. c. xiv	25 May 1900
An Act to confer further powers on the Grantham Gas Company and for other purposes.
Kingston-upon-Thames Gas Act 1900	63 & 64 Vict. c. xv	25 May 1900
An Act to authorise the Kingston-upon-Thames Gas Company to raise additional capital convert their existing capital acquire lands amend their existing Acts and for other purposes.
Southampton Harbour Act 1900	63 & 64 Vict. c. xvi	25 May 1900
An Act to confer further powers upon the Southampton Harbour Board and for other purposes.
Wetherby District Water Act 1900 (repealed)	63 & 64 Vict. c. xvii	25 May 1900
An Act to enable the Wetherby District Water Company to extend their limits of supply construct additional waterworks and for other purposes. (Repealed by Claro Water Board Order 1958 (SI 1958/1808))
Army and Navy Investment Trust Company (Limited) Act 1900	63 & 64 Vict. c. xviii	25 May 1900
An Act for authorising the Army and Navy Investment Trust Company Limited to prepare and cany into effect a Scheme or Schemes of Arrangement with its stockholders or with the holders of either class of stock and to reduce its capital and for other purposes.
Birmingham University Act 1900	63 & 64 Vict. c. xix	25 May 1900
An Act to transfer all the property and liabilities of Mason University College in the city of Birmingham to the University of Birmingham and to repeal the Mason University College Act 1897 (Note: Mason University College Act 1897 (60 & 61 Vict. c. xx)) to confer certain powers on the said University and for other purposes.
New Russia Company Act 1900	63 & 64 Vict. c. xx	25 May 1900
An Act to alter the capital of the New Russia Company Limited and for other purposes.
Metropolitan Police Provisional Order Confirmation Act 1900 (repealed)	63 & 64 Vict. c. xxi	25 May 1900
An Act to confirm a Provisional Order made by One of Her Majesty's Principal Secretaries of State under the Metropolitan Police Act 1886 (Note: Metropolitan Police Act 1886 (49 & 50 Vict. c. 22)) and the Metropolitan Police Courts Act 1897 (Note: Metropolitan Police Courts Act 1897 (60 & 61 Vict. c. 26)) relating to lands in the parishes of St. Mary Stratford Bow East Molesey and Clerkenwell. (Repealed by Statute Law (Repeals) Act 2008 (c. 12))
Electric Lighting Orders Confirmation (No. 2) Act 1900	63 & 64 Vict. c. xxii	25 May 1900
An Act to confirm certain Provisional Orders made by the Board of Trade under the Electric Lighting Acts 1882 (Note: Electric Lighting Act 1882 (45 & 46 Vict. c. 56)) and 1888 (Note: Electric Lighting Act 1888 (51 & 52 Vict. c. 12)) relating to Brierley Hill Cleethorpes-with-Thrunscoe Elland Exmouth Newark Penzance Prestwich Redcar Sowerby Bridge and Whitefield.
	Brierley Hill Electric Lighting Order 1900	
	Cleethorpes Electric Lighting Order 1900	
	Elland Electric Lighting Order 1900	
	Exmouth Electric Lighting Order 1900	
	Newark Electric Lighting Order 1900	
	Penzance Electric Lighting Order 1900	
	Prestwich Electric Lighting Order 1900	
	Redcar Electric Lighting Order 1900	
	Sowerby Bridge Electric Lighting Order 1900	
	Whitefield Electric Lighting Order 1900	
Rhymney Iron Company's Act 1900	63 & 64 Vict. c. xxiii	25 June 1900
An Act to confirm the issue by the Rhymney Iron Company Limited of certain shares credited as partly paid up.
Church's Patent Act 1900	63 & 64 Vict. c. xxiv	25 June 1900
An Act for rendering valid certain Letters Patent granted to Melvin Batchlor Church for the manufacture of an improved compound for coating and decorating walls and other surfaces and for the production of casts or mouldings and for analogous purposes.
Otley Urban District Council (Waterworks) Act 1900	63 & 64 Vict. c. xxv	25 June 1900
An Act to enable the Urban District Council of Otley to construct additional waterworks and for other purposes.
Cork, Bandon and South Coast Railway Act 1900	63 & 64 Vict. c. xxvi	25 June 1900
An Act to empower the Cork Bandon and South Coast Railway Company to stop up certain level crossings and substitute bridges to divert and alter certain roads to construct an aerial ropeway to acquire additional lands to consolidate their debenture stocks and amend their Act of 1888 (Note: Cork, Bandon and South Coast Railway Act 1888 (51 & 52 Vict. c. lxxxvii)) as to the consolidation of preference stocks to subscribe to the Bantry Bay Steamship Company Limited to confer further powers upon the Company and for other purposes.
Higham Ferrers Water Act 1900	63 & 64 Vict. c. xxvii	25 June 1900
An Act for supplying with water the borough of Higham Ferrers and certain parishes and places adjacent thereto in the county of Northampton.
Cleethorpes Gas Act 1900	63 & 64 Vict. c. xxviii	25 June 1900
An Act to convert the capital of the Cleethorpes Gas Company to raise additional capital to construct works and for other purposes.
Dundee Harbour (Amendment) Act 1900 (repealed)	63 & 64 Vict. c. xxix	25 June 1900
An Act to further amend the Acts relating to the harbour of Dundee and for other purposes. (Repealed by Dundee Harbour and Tay Ferries Consolidation Act 1911 (1 & 2 Geo. 5. c. lxxx))
London, Brighton and South Coast Railway (Various Powers) Act 1900	63 & 64 Vict. c. xxx	25 June 1900
An Act to confer further powers on the London Brighton and South Coast Railway Company and for other purposes.
Governments Stock and other Securities Investment Company Act 1900 (repealed)	63 & 64 Vict. c. xxxi	25 June 1900
An Act for empowering the Governments Stock and other Securities Investment Company Limited to increase the dividend upon its Preferred Ordinary Stock and to amend the Governments Stock Investment Company Limited Act 1887. (Note: Governments Stock Investment Company Act 1887 (50 & 51 Vict. c. xxxii)) (Repealed by Governments Stock and other Securities Investment Company Act 1928 (18 & 19 Geo. 5. c. vii))
Southport Water Act 1900 (repealed)	63 & 64 Vict. c. xxxii	25 June 1900
An Act for the granting of further powers to the Southport Waterworks Company. (Repealed by West Lancashire Water Board Order 1960 (SI 1960/2149))
Hastings Harbour Act 1900	63 & 64 Vict. c. xxxiii	25 June 1900
An Act to extend the periods limited for the purchase of lands for and for the completion of the harbour works to enable the Commissioners to borrow further money and for other purposes.
Maidenhead Gas Act 1900	63 & 64 Vict. c. xxxiv	25 June 1900
An Act to amend the Maidenhead Gas Act 1876 (Note: Maidenhead Gas Act 1876 (39 & 40 Vict. c. xxxii)) and to confer further powers upon the Maidenhead Gas Company.
Glastonbury Corporation Gas Act 1900	63 & 64 Vict. c. xxxv	25 June 1900
An Act to empower the Mayor Aldermen and Burgesses of the borough of Glastonbury to supply gas and to provide for the transfer of the undertaking of the Glastonbury Gas and Coke Company Limited to the Corporation and for other purposes.
Manchester Ship Canal Act 1900	63 & 64 Vict. c. xxxvi	25 June 1900
An Act to enable the Manchester Ship Canal Company to acquire the Manchester Racecourse and other lands and to construct a new dock railway and works to establish a thrift fund for their officers and servants and for other purposes.
Central London Railway Act 1900	63 & 64 Vict. c. xxxvii	25 June 1900
An Act to amend the Central London Railway Act 1891 (Note: Central London Railway Act 1891 (54 & 55 Vict. c. cxcvi)) with reference to cheap fares for labouring classes.
Lancashire Inebriates Acts Board Act 1900	63 & 64 Vict. c. xxxviii	25 June 1900
An Act to constitute an Inebriates Acts Board for the County Palatine of Lancaster and for other purposes.
Dorking Water Act 1900	63 & 64 Vict. c. xxxix	25 June 1900
An Act for empowering the Dorking Water Company to raise additional capital and for other purposes.
North Pembrokeshire Water and Gas Act 1900	63 & 64 Vict. c. xl	25 June 1900
An Act to enable the Fishguard Water and Gas Company to extend their limits of supply to construct additional waterworks and gasworks to change the name of the Company and for other purposes.
Menstone Waterworks (Transfer) Act 1900 (repealed)	63 & 64 Vict. c. xli	25 June 1900
An Act to authorise the Rural District Council of Wharfedale to purchase the undertaking of the Menstone Waterworks Company and for other purposes. (Repealed by Rombalds Water Board Order 1962 (SI 1962/271))
Newport Corporation Act 1900	63 & 64 Vict. c. xlii	25 June 1900
An Act to confer further powers upon the Mayor Aldermen and Burgesses of the borough of Newport for the construction of a bridge over the River Usk and of tramways and other works and for other purposes.
Newtown and Llanllwchaiarn Urban District Council Act 1900	63 & 64 Vict. c. xliii	25 June 1900
An Act to empower the Urban District Council of the Urban District of Newtown and Llanllwchaiarn to supply gas and to purchase the undertaking of the Newtown and Llanllwchaiarn Gas and Coke Company Limited and for other purposes.
Cowes Pier Act 1900	63 & 64 Vict. c. xliv	25 June 1900
An Act to empower the Urban District Council of Cowes to construct a pier and other works to borrow moneys therefor and for other purposes.
Great Central Railway Act 1900	63 & 64 Vict. c. xlv	25 June 1900
An Act to enable the Great Central Railway Company to make new railways and other works to acquire additional lands to extend the time for the compulsory purchase of certain lands for the completion of certain railways and for the sale of superfluous lands to raise additional capital to define and regulate the existing capital of the Company to confer further powers upon the Wrexham Mold and Connah's Quay Railway Company the Liverpool St. Helens and South Lancashire Railway Company and the Nottingham Joint Station Committee and for other purposes.
Electric Lighting Orders Confirmation (No. 1) Act 1900	63 & 64 Vict. c. xlvi	25 June 1900
An Act to confirm certain Provisional Orders made by the Board of Trade under the Electric Lighting Acts 1882 and 1888 relating to Basingstoke Erdington Farnham Felixstowe and Walton Leek Littleborough Maryport Nantwich Ormskirk and Penrith.
	Basingstoke Electric Lighting Order 1900	
	Erdington Electric Lighting Order 1900	
	Farnham Electric Lighting Order 1900	
	Felixstowe and Walton Electric Lighting Order 1900	
	Leek Electric Lighting Order 1900	
	Littleborough Electric Lighting Order 1900	
	Maryport Electric Lighting Order 1900	
	Nantwich Electric Lighting Order 1900	
	Ormskirk Electric Lighting Order 1900	
	Penrith Electric Lighting Order 1900	
Electric Lighting Orders Confirmation (No. 3) Act 1900	63 & 64 Vict. c. xlvii	25 June 1900
An Act to confirm certain Provisional Orders made by the Board of Trade under the Electric Lighting Acts 1882 and 1888 relating to Allerton Much Woolton Little Woolton and Childwall Barnet Barnstaple Birkenhead (Extension) Bonchurch Boston Brierfield Egremont Hyde and Sudbury.
	Allerton, Much Woolton, Little Woolton and Childwall Electric Lighting Order 1900	
	Liverpool Order 1900	
	Barnet Urban District Council Electric Lighting Order 1900	
	Barnstaple Electric Lighting Order 1900	
	Birkenhead Corporation Electric Lighting Order 1900	
	Bonchurch Electric Lighting Order 1900	
	Boston Electric Lighting Order 1900	
	Brierfield Electric Lighting Order 1900	
	Egremont Electric Lighting Order 1900	
	Hyde Electric Lighting Order 1900	
	Sudbury Electric Lighting Order 1900	
Electric Lighting Orders Confirmation (No. 4) Act 1900	63 & 64 Vict. c. xlviii	25 June 1900
An Act to confiim certain Provisional Orders made by the Board of Trade under the Electric Lighting Acts 1882 and 1888 relating to Bredbury and Romiley Bridlington Cheadle and Gatley Hebburn Kendal Long Eaton Lytham Ormesby Sleaford and Tunstall (with Goldenhill and Chell).
	Bredbury and Romiley Electric Lighting Order 1900	
	Bridlington Electric Lighting Order 1900	
	Cheadle and Gatley Electric Lighting Order 1900	
	Hebburn Electric Lighting Order 1900	
	Kendal Electric Supply Order 1900	
	Long Eaton Electric Lighting Order 1900	
	Lytham Electric Lighting Order 1900	
	Ormesby Electric Lighting Order 1900	
	Sleaford Electric Lighting Order 1900	
	Tunstall Electric Lighting Order 1900	
Electric Lighting Orders Confirmation (No. 5) Act 1900	63 & 64 Vict. c. xlix	25 June 1900
An Act to confirm certain Provisional Orders made by the Board of Trade under the Electric Lighting Acts 1882 and 1888 relating to Bishop Auckland Caterham (with Warlingham) Cowpen Grantham Nuneaton and Chilvers Coton Ogmore Valley Redruth St. Helen's (Isle of Wight) South Blyth and Weybridge.
	Bishop Auckland Electric Lighting Order 1900	
	Caterham Electric Lighting Order 1900	
	Cowpen Electric Lighting Order 1900	
	Grantham Electric Lighting Order 1900	
	Nuneaton and Chilvers Coton Electric Lighting Order 1900	
	Ogmore Valley Electric Lighting Order 1900	
	Redruth Electric Lighting Order 1900	
	St. Helens (Isle of Wight) Electric Lighting Order 1900	
	South Blyth Electric Lighting Order 1900	
	Weybridge Electric Lighting Order 1900	
Metropolitan Commons (Petersham) Supplemental Act 1900	63 & 64 Vict. c. l	10 July 1900
An Act to confirm a Scheme relating to Petersham Common in the Parish of Petersham and Borough of Richmond in the County of Surrey.
	Petersham Common Order 1900	
Local Government Board (Ireland) Provisional Order Confirmation (No. 1) Act 1900	63 & 64 Vict. c. li	10 July 1900
An Act to confirm a Provisional Order of the Local Government Board for Ireland relating to the Town of Westport.
	Westport Urban District Order 1900	
Local Government Board (Ireland) Provisional Order Confirmation (No. 2) Act 1900	63 & 64 Vict. c. lii	10 July 1900
An Act to confirm a Provisional Order of the Local Government Board for Ireland relating to the Town of Skibbereen.
	Skibbereen Urban District Order 1900	
Local Government Board's Provisional Orders Confirmation (No. 2) Act 1900	63 & 64 Vict. c. liii	10 July 1900
An Act to confirm certain Provisional Orders of the Local Government Board relating to Dewsbury Llandudno Macclesfield Manchester Newton in Mackerfield and Wigan.
	Dewsbury Order 1900	
	Llandudno Order 1900	
	Macclesfield Order 1900	
	Manchester Order (No. 1) 1900	
	Newton in Mackerfield Order 1900	
	Mackerfield Order 1900	
	Newton in Mackerfield Order 1900	
	Wigan Order 1900	
Local Government Board's Provisional Orders Confirmation (No. 3) Act 1900	63 & 64 Vict. c. liv	10 July 1900
An Act to confirm certain Provisional Orders of the Local Government Board relating to Aberavon Burslem the Chesterfield Gas and Water Board District Colne Fenton and Kendal.
	Aberavon (Markets and Slaughterhouses) Order 1900	
	Burslem Order 1900	
	Chesterfield (Gas and Water Board) Order 1900	
	Colne Order 1900	
	Fenton Order 1900	
	Kendal Order 1900	
Local Government Board's Provisional Orders Confirmation (No. 4) Act 1900	63 & 64 Vict. c. lv	10 July 1900
An Act to confirm certain Provisional Orders of the Local Government Board relating to Barnsley (Rural) Featherstone Hambledon (Rural) Lutterworth (Rural) Orsett (Rural) St. Helens Wigan and the Wirral Joint Hospital District.
	Barnsley Rural Order 1900	
	Featherstone Order 1900	
	Hambledon Rural (Shalford) Order 1900	
	Lutterworth Rural Order 1900	
	Orsett Rural Order 1900	
	St. Helens Order 1900	
	Wigan Order (No. 2) 1900	
	Wirral Joint Hospital Order 1900	
Local Government Board's Provisional Orders Confirmation (Gas) Act 1900	63 & 64 Vict. c. lvi	10 July 1900
An Act to confirm certain Provisional Orders of the Local Government Board relating to Ilkeston and Roth well (Northampton).
	Ilkeston Gas Order 1900	
	Rothwell (Northampton) Gas Order 1900	
Leith Burgh Order Confirmation Act 1900	63 & 64 Vict. c. lvii	10 July 1900
An Act to confirm a Provisional Order under the Burgh Police (Scotland) Act 1892 (Note: Burgh Police (Scotland) Act 1892 (55 & 56 Vict. c. 55)) to increase the number of Magistrates in the Burgh of Leith.
	Leith Order 1900	
Gas and Water Orders Confirmation Act 1900	63 & 64 Vict. c. lviii	10 July 1900
An Act to confirm certain Provisional Orders made by the Board of Trade under the Gas and Water Works Facilities Act 1870 (Note: Gas and Water Works Facilities Act 1870 (33 & 34 Vict. c. 70)) relating to Hoylake and West Kirby Gas and Water Manningtree and Mistley (Essex) Gas South Elmsall South Kirkby and North Elmsall Gas and Steyning and District Water.
	Hoylake and West Kirby Gas and Water Order 1900	
	Manningtree and Mistley Gas Order 1900	
	South Elmsall, South Kirkby and North Elmsall Gas Order 1900	
	Steyning and District Water Order 1900	
Education Board Provisional Orders Confirmation (Brighton and Preston United District, &c.) Act 1900	63 & 64 Vict. c. lix	10 July 1900
An Act to confirm certain Provisional Orders made by the Education Department under the Elementary Education Acts 1870 to 1899 to enable the School Boards for Brighton and Preston United District Liverpool Plymouth Salford and Willesden to put in force the Lands Clauses Acts.
	Brighton and Preston (Sussex) School Board Order 1900	
	Liverpool School Board Order 1900	
	Plymouth (Devon) School Board Order 1900	
	Salford School Board Order 1900	
	Willesden (Middlesex) School Board Order 1900	
Pier and Harbour Orders Confirmation (No. 1) Act 1900	63 & 64 Vict. c. lx	10 July 1900
An Act to confirm certain Provisional Orders made by the Board of Trade under the General Pier and Harbour Act 1861 (Note: General Pier and Harbour Act 1861 (24 & 25 Vict. c. 45)) relating to Eastbourne Ilfracombe Lowestoft and Portessie.
	Eastbourne Pier Order 1900	
	Ilfracombe Harbour Order 1900	
	Lowestoft (South) Pier Order 1900	
	Portessie Harbour Order 1900	
Great Berkhampstead Waterworks Act 1900	63 & 64 Vict. c. lxi	10 July 1900
An Act for incorporating and conferring powers on the Great Berkhampstead Waterworks Company.
Motherwell Water (Additional Supply) Act 1900	63 & 64 Vict. c. lxii	10 July 1900
An Act to authorise the Commissioners of the Burgh of Motherwell to provide an additional water supply to the burgh and to make and maintain new and additional waterworks and for other purposes.
Morecambe Urban District Council (Gas) Act 1900	63 & 64 Vict. c. lxiii	10 July 1900
An Act to provide for the transfer of the undertaking of the Morecambe Gas and Light Company to the Morecambe Urban District Council and to confer further powers on the said Council with respect to the supply of gas and for other purposes.
Birmingham (King Edward the Sixth) School Act 1900	63 & 64 Vict. c. lxiv	10 July 1900
An Act to make new provisions with respect to the governing body of the Schools of King Edward the Sixth in Birmingham and with respect to the management of the schools property and revenues under their control and to confer further powers on the said governing body and for other purposes.
Ossett Corporation Gas Act 1900	63 & 64 Vict. c. lxv	10 July 1900
An Act to authorise the sale of the undertaking of the Ossett Gas Company to the Corporation of Ossett and to empower the Corporation to supply gas within the Borough of Ossett and places adjacent thereto.
Southport Extension and Tramways Act 1900 (repealed)	63 & 64 Vict. c. lxvi	10 July 1900
An Act to extend the boundaries of the Borough of Southport to authorise the construction of tramways and to confer further powers on the Corporation with respect to the supply of gas and electricity and for other purposes. (Repealed by County of Merseyside Act 1980 (c. x))
Stockport Corporation Tramways Act 1900	63 & 64 Vict. c. lxvii	10 July 1900
An Act to empower the Mayor Aldermen and Burgesses of the County Borough of Stockport to construct tramways in the borough and for other purposes.
Mersey Docks and Harbour Act 1900	63 & 64 Vict. c. lxviii	10 July 1900
An Act to amend in certain respects the Acts relating to the Mersey Docks and Harbour Board and for other purposes.
Paignton Urban District Water Act 1900	63 & 64 Vict. c. lxix	10 July 1900
An Act to authorise the Paignton Urban District Council to construct additional waterworks and for other purposes.
Brewery and Commercial Investment Trust Ltd. Conversion of Shares Act 1900	63 & 64 Vict. c. lxx	10 July 1900
An Act for enabling the Brewery and Commercial Investment Trust Limited to arrange for the extinction of its Founders Shares for issuing shares in satisfaction of such shares for subdividing the stock of the Company and creating certain preferences and for other purposes.
Bristol Waterworks Act 1900	63 & 64 Vict. c. lxxi	10 July 1900
An Act to extend the powers of the Bristol Waterworks Company for the protection of the purity of their waters.
Commercial Union Assurance Company Act 1900 (repealed)	63 & 64 Vict. c. lxxii	10 July 1900
An Act to remove doubts as to the investment of moneys belonging to the Life Fund of the Commercial Union Assurance Company Limited in the name of the Company and for other purposes. (Repealed by Commercial Union Assurance Company Act 1908 (8 Edw. 7. c. lxvii))
Milford Docks Act 1900 (repealed)	63 & 64 Vict. c. lxxiii	10 July 1900
An Act to confer further powers upon the Milford Docks Company and for other purposes. (Repealed by Milford Docks Act 1930 (20 & 21 Geo. 5. c. lxxi))
Birmingham Corporation (Stock) Act 1900 (repealed)	63 & 64 Vict. c. lxxiv	10 July 1900
An Act to amend the provisions of the Local Acts and Orders in force in the City of Birmingham which relate to Birmingham Corporation Stock and to make further and better provisions with respect to the borrowing of money by the Corporation of Birmingham. (Repealed by West Midlands County Council Act 1980 (c. xi))
Scottish American Investment Company Limited Act 1900 (repealed)	63 & 64 Vict. c. lxxv	10 July 1900
An Act for empowering the Scottish American Investment Company Limited to create a preference stock and for other purposes relating thereto. (Repealed by Scottish American Investment Company Limited Order Confirmation Act 1960 (8 & 9 Eliz. 2. c. vii))
Bedford Gas Act 1900	63 & 64 Vict. c. lxxvi	10 July 1900
An Act to confer further powers on the Bedford Gas Light Company.
Neath Harbour Act 1900	63 & 64 Vict. c. lxxvii	10 July 1900
An Act to confer upon the Neath Harbour Commissioners further powers for the improvement of the Harbour to reduce and regulate the indebtedness and borrowing powers of the Commissioners and for other purposes.
Taff Vale Railway Act 1900	63 & 64 Vict. c. lxxviii	10 July 1900
An Act to confer further powers upon the Taff Vale Railway Company with reference to the construction of works and the acquisition of lands and for other purposes.
Hoylake and West Kirby Improvement Act 1900	63 & 64 Vict. c. lxxix	10 July 1900
An Act to confer powers upon the Urban District Council of Hoylake and West Kirby for the construction of a parade new streets pier and other works to authorise the inclosure of the Great Meols Common and for other purposes.
Wakefield Corporation Market Act 1900	63 & 64 Vict. c. lxxx	10 July 1900
An Act to empower the Mayor Aldermen and Citizens of the city of Wakefield to purchase the undertaking of the Wakefield Borough Market Company and to make further provision in regard to the markets and slaughter-houses of the said city and for other purposes.
British Gas Light Company (Staffordshire Potteries) Act 1900 (repealed)	63 & 64 Vict. c. lxxxi	10 July 1900
An Act for empowering the British Gas Light Company Limited to erect new works and to expend further capital at their Staffordshire Potteries Station. (Repealed by Stoke-on-Trent (Gas Consolidation) Act 1922 (12 & 13 Geo. 5. c. xxii))
Glasgow and South Western Railway Act 1900	63 & 64 Vict. c. lxxxii	10 July 1900
An Act for conferring further powers on the Glasgow and South Western Railway Company for the construction of works and the acquisition of lands for extending the powers of the Glasgow and Renfrew District Railway Company for the compulsory purchase of lands for empowering the Glasgow and South Western Railway Company to raise additional capital and for other purposes.
South Eastern Railway Act 1900	63 & 64 Vict. c. lxxxiii	10 July 1900
An Act for conferring further powers on the South Eastern Railway Company in reference to their own undertaking and the undertakings of other Companies in which they are interested and for other purposes.
Hamilton Burgh Act 1900	63 & 64 Vict. c. lxxxiv	10 July 1900
An Act to amend the Hamilton Burgh Act 1878 (Note: Hamilton Burgh Act 1878 (41 & 42 Vict. c. cxxxvii)) and for other purposes.
North Warwickshire Water Act 1900	63 & 64 Vict. c. lxxxv	10 July 1900
An Act to enable the North Warwickshire Water Company to extend their limits of supply to construct additional waterworks and for other purposes.
Widnes and Runcorn Bridge Act 1900	63 & 64 Vict. c. lxxxvi	10 July 1900
An Act to authorise the construction of a bridge across the River Mersey and Manchester Ship Canal between Widnes and Runcorn and for other purposes.
Lincoln Corporation Tramways, &c. Act 1900	63 & 64 Vict. c. lxxxvii	10 July 1900
An Act to confer further powers upon the Corporation of the City of Lincoln with respect to tramways and to authorise the Corporation to construct new tramways and to work Tramways within and without the City and to borrow money and for other purposes.
City of London Electric Lighting Act 1900	63 & 64 Vict. c. lxxxviii	10 July 1900
An Act to empower the City of London Electric Lighting Company Limited to acquire lands and work generating stations and for other purposes.
Lancashire and Yorkshire Railway Act 1900	63 & 64 Vict. c. lxxxix	10 July 1900
An Act for conferring further powers on the Lancashire and Yorkshire Railway Company with relation to their own undertaking and upon that Company and the London and North Western Railway Company with relation to the Preston and Wyre Railway and for other purposes.
Woodbridge District Water Act 1900	63 & 64 Vict. c. xc	10 July 1900
An Act for incorporating the Woodbridge District Water Company and empowering them to construct works and supply water and for other purposes.
Wirral Railway Act 1900	63 & 64 Vict. c. xci	10 July 1900
An Act to authorise the Wirral Railway Company to work the traffic on their railways by electrical or other motive power and for other purposes.
Sheffield District Railway Act 1900	63 & 64 Vict. c. xcii	10 July 1900
An Act to authorise the Sheffield District Railway Company to construct a branch railway bridges and other works in connexion with their undertaking and to raise additional capital and for other purposes.
East Stirlingshire Water Act 1900	63 & 64 Vict. c. xciii	10 July 1900
An Act to empower the Eastern District Committee of the County Council of the County of Stirling to construct waterworks and to supply water within their district to authorise the County Council of the County of Stirling to acquire lands and servitudes for the purposes of such water supply to authorise and require the said County Council to levy assessments and to borrow money and for other purposes.
Hartlepool Gas and Water Act 1900 (repealed)	63 & 64 Vict. c. xciv	30 July 1900
An Act to consolidate and convert the capital of the Hartlepool Gas and Water Company and to enable that Company to raise additional moneys and for other purposes. (Repealed by Hartlepools Water (Consolidation, etc.) Order 1986 (SI 1986/401))
Latimer Road and Acton Railway Act 1900 (repealed)	63 & 64 Vict. c. xcv	30 July 1900
An Act for the abandonment of the Latimer Road and Acton Railway. (Repealed by Statute Law (Repeals) Act 2013 (c. 2))
Mountain Ash Water and Gas Act 1900	63 & 64 Vict. c. xcvi	30 July 1900
An Act to authorise the Urban District Council of Mountain Ash to construct additional waterworks and gasworks and for other purposes.
Airdrie and Coatbridge Tramways Act 1900 (repealed)	63 & 64 Vict. c. xcvii	30 July 1900
An Act to incorporate the Airdrie and Coatbridge Tramways Company and to empower that Company to make and maintain tramways and for other purposes. (Repealed by Glasgow (Tramways, &c.) Order Confirmation Act 1922 (13 Geo. 5. Sess. 2. c. ii))
Airdrie Coatbridge and District Water Trust Act 1900	63 & 64 Vict. c. xcviii	30 July 1900
An Act to constitute and incorporate a Water Trust for the Burghs of Coatbridge and Airdrie and the districts adjacent thereto in the County of Lanark to transfer to and vest in such Trust the undertaking of the Airdrie and Coatbridge Water Company and for other purposes.
Brighton Corporation Act 1900 (repealed)	63 & 64 Vict. c. xcix	30 July 1900
An Act to empower the Mayor Aldermen and Burgesses of the County Borough of Brighton to construct and work tramways to erect electric generating stations and for other purposes. (Repealed by Brighton Corporation Act 1931 (21 & 22 Geo. 5. c. cix))
Reading Corporation (Tramways) Act 1900	63 & 64 Vict. c. c	30 July 1900
An Act to confer powers upon the Corporation of the Borough of Reading with respect to the construction and working of tramways in the borough and for other purposes.
Wolverhampton Gas Act 1900	63 & 64 Vict. c. ci	30 July 1900
An Act for conferring further powers on the Wolverhampton Gas Company.
Vale of Rheidol Light Railway Act 1900	63 & 64 Vict. c. cii	30 July 1900
An Act to extend the period for the purchase of lands and for the construction of the authorised railway and to work the traffic thereon by electrical or other motive power and for other purposes.
Great Yarmouth Port and Haven Act 1900	63 & 64 Vict. c. ciii	30 July 1900
An Act for enlarging the powers of the Commissioners of the Port and Haven of Great Yarmouth and for other purposes.
Edinburgh District Lunacy Board Act 1900	63 & 64 Vict. c. civ	30 July 1900
An Act to empower the District Lunacy Board for the Edinburgh Lunacy District to construct railways waterworks sewerage and other works in the County of Linlithgow to acquire lands for protection of their water supply and for other purposes.
Cork Electric Tramways (Extension) Act 1900	63 & 64 Vict. c. cv	30 July 1900
An Act to enable the Cork Electric Tramways and Lighting Company Limited to extend their tramways to Blackrock and for other purposes.
Fishguard and Rosslare Railways and Harbours Act 1900	63 & 64 Vict. c. cvi	30 July 1900
An Act to empower the Fishguard and Rosslare Railways and Harbours Company to construct additional harbour works at Rosslare and alterations of portions; of their authorised railways and for other purposes.
Spalding Water Act 1900 (repealed)	63 & 64 Vict. c. cvii	30 July 1900
An Act to authorise the Urban District Council of Spalding to purchase the undertaking of the Spalding Waterworks Company and for other purposes. (Repealed by South Lincolnshire Water Board Order 1962 (SI 1962/840))
Falkirk Corporation Gas and Burgh Extension Act 1900	63 & 64 Vict. c. cviii	30 July 1900
An Act to authorise the Magistrates and Town Council of the Burgh of Falkirk to construct new gasworks and other works and to acquire lands and to confer further powers on the Magistrates and Council in relation to their gas undertaking to extend the municipal and police boundaries of the Burgh and for other purposes.
Rhymney Railway Act 1900	63 & 64 Vict. c. cix	30 July 1900
An Act to enable the Rhymney Railway Company to raise additional capital and for other purposes.
Great Eastern Railway (General Powers) Act 1900	63 & 64 Vict. c. cx	30 July 1900
An Act to authorise the Great Eastern Railway Company to make further railways widenings and works to confirm an agreement between the Company and the Hertford County Council and the Epping Rural District Council and other parties and to authorise the Company and the said County Council and District Council to construct roads in accordance therewith to extend the time for the purchase of lands for and for the completion of part of an authorised railway to confer further powers upon the Company and for other purposes.
London and India Docks Amalgamation Act 1900 (repealed)	63 & 64 Vict. c. cxi	30 July 1900
An Act for the Amalgamation of the undertakings of the London and St. Katherine Docks Company and the East and West India Dock Company and for other purposes. (Repealed by Port of London (Consolidation) Act 1920 (10 & 11 Geo. 5. c. clxxiii))
Saint Albans Waterworks Act 1900	63 & 64 Vict. c. cxii	30 July 1900
An Act to authorise the Saint Alban's Waterworks Company to acquire further lands and to raise further moneys and to extend their limits of supply and for other purposes.
Donegal Railway Act 1900	63 & 64 Vict. c. cxiii	30 July 1900
An Act to divide the separate undertaking authorised by the Donegal Railway Act 1896 (Note: Donegal Railway Act 1896 (59 & 60 Vict. c. ccxxii)) into two separate undertakings to extend the time for the purchase o£ lands and completion of works by that Act authorised to provide for the granting of rebates in favour of the railway from Donegal to Ballyshannon to release the County Council of the County of Donegal from their liability under the West Donegal Light Railway Order and for other purposes.
Great Southern and Western Railway Act 1900	63 & 64 Vict. c. cxiv	30 July 1900
An Act to empower the Great Southern and Western Railway Company to construct a pier at Valencia to abstract water from the River Suir and lay pipes to their Thurles Station to acquire additional lands to vest in the Company the undertaking of the Mitchelstown and Fermoy Light Railway Company to subscribe further sums to the Southern Hotels (Limited) to raise additional capital and for other purposes.
Bray (Wicklow) Urban District Council (Extension of Time) Act 1900	63 & 64 Vict. c. cxv	30 July 1900
An Act to continue the powers for the making of and to extend the time limited for the completion of certain works authorised by the Bray Township Act 1890 (Note: Bray Township Act 1890 (53 & 54 Vict. c. clxi)) namely the Promenade Pier and landing stage thereby authorised and for other purposes.
Westgate and Birchington Water Act 1900	63 & 64 Vict. c. cxvi	30 July 1900
An Act for defining and extending the limits of supply of the Westgate and Birchington Water Company and for conferring further powers on the Company for the construction of works the raising of capital and otherwise in relation to their undertaking and for other purposes.
Lee Conservancy Act 1900	63 & 64 Vict. c. cxvii	30 July 1900
An Act to alter the constitution and amend and extend the statutory powers of the Lee Conservancy Board.
Regents Canal and Dock Act 1900	63 & 64 Vict. c. cxviii	30 July 1900
An Act to consolidate the Debenture Stocks of the North Metropolitan Railway and Canal Company to amend in certain respects the Acts relating to the Company to change the name of the Company and for other purposes.
South Staffordshire Tramways Act 1900	63 & 64 Vict. c. cxix	30 July 1900
An Act to authorise the South Staffordshire Tramways Company to sell and transfer portions of their undertaking to local authorities to confirm a lease of their undertaking to the South Staffordshire Tramways (Lessee) Company Limited to rearrange their capital and for other purposes.
Falkirk and District Waterworks Act 1900	63 & 64 Vict. c. cxx	30 July 1900
An Act to provide all additional supply of water to the Burgh of Falkirk and districts and places adjacent and for the construction and maintenance of new and additional works to extend the limits of compulsory supply to confer further powers on the Falkirk and Larbert Water Trustees and for other purposes.
Hamilton, Motherwell and Wishaw Tramways Act 1900	63 & 64 Vict. c. cxxi	30 July 1900
An Act for incorporating and conferring powers on the Hamilton Motherwell and Wishaw Tramways Company and for other purposes.
Wellingborough and District Tramroads Act 1900	63 & 64 Vict. c. cxxii	30 July 1900
An Act to empower the British Electric Traction Company Limited to construct tramroads in the County of Northampton and for other purposes.
Aston Manor Tramways Act 1900	63 & 64 Vict. c. cxxiii	30 July 1900
An Act to empower the Urban District Council for the District of Aston Manor in the County of Warwick to construct tramways and to confer various powers relating to tramways upon that District Council.
Exmouth Urban District Water Act 1900	63 & 64 Vict. c. cxxiv	30 July 1900
An Act to authorise the Exmouth Urban District Council to purchase the undertaking of the Exmouth and District Waterworks Company and to supply water within their district and the parish of East Budleigh and for other purposes.
Gwyrfai District Water Act 1900	63 & 64 Vict. c. cxxv	30 July 1900
An Act for supplying with water the Parish of Llanllyfni being part of the Rural District of Gwyrfai in the County of Carnarvon.
Dearne Valley Railway Act 1900	63 & 64 Vict. c. cxxvi	30 July 1900
An Act to extend the time limited by the Dearne Valley Railway Act 1897 (Note: Dearne Valley Railway Act 1897 (60 & 61 Vict. c. ccxliii)) for the compulsory purchase of lands for and the completion of certain of the works thereby authorised to authorise the Dearne Valley Railway Company to abandon certain of their authorised works and to construct further works and for other purposes.
Whitechapel and Bow Railway Act 1900	63 & 64 Vict. c. cxxvii	30 July 1900
An Act to confer further powers on the Whitechapel and Bow Railway Company and for other purposes.
G. H. Hammond Company (Limited) Act 1900	63 & 64 Vict. c. cxxviii	30 July 1900
An Act for reorganising the capital of the G. H. Hammond Company Limited and enabling that Company to redeem and convert its debentures and income stock.
London and San Francisco Bank Limited Act 1900	63 & 64 Vict. c. cxxix	30 July 1900
An Act to reduce the capital and extend the powers of the London and San Francisco Bank Limited and for other purposes.
Belfast and County Down Railway Act 1900	63 & 64 Vict. c. cxxx	30 July 1900
An Act to authorise the Belfast and County Down Railway Company to construct a railway from Newcastle to join the railway of the Great Northern Railway Company (Ireland) at Castlewellan to run over and use a portion of the railway of that Company to confer further powers upon the Company with reference to steam vessels and further powers in connexion with their undertaking and for other purposes.
Walker and Wallsend Union Gas Company's (Electricity Capital) Act 1900 (repealed)	63 & 64 Vict. c. cxxxi	30 July 1900
An Act to enable the Walker and Wallsend Union Gas Company to raise additional capital and for other purposes. (Repealed by Newcastle-upon-Tyne Electric Supply Company's Act 1903 (3 Edw. 7. c. clxxiv))
Nottingham Corporation Act 1900 (repealed)	63 & 64 Vict. c. cxxxii	30 July 1900
An Act to empower the Corporation of Nottingham to make certain street improvements and for other purposes. (Repealed by Statute Law (Repeals) Act 1995 (c. 44))
Edinburgh Corporation Act 1900 (repealed)	63 & 64 Vict. c. cxxxiii	30 July 1900
An Act to extend the boundaries of the City and Royal Burgh of Edinburgh and County of the City of Edinburgh to authorise the Lord Provost Magistrates and Council of the City to purchase and acquire lands at Saughton to erect and maintain a tramway power station at Portobello to construct works and tramways to acquire lands to amend Acts and for other purposes. (Repealed by Edinburgh Corporation Order Confirmation Act 1933 (24 & 25 Geo. 5. c. v))
Mersey Railway Act 1900	63 & 64 Vict. c. cxxxiv	30 July 1900
An Act to authorise the working of the Mersey Railway and railways connected therewith by electricity to regulate the capital of the Mersey Railway Company and for other purposes.
Rawmarsh Urban District Council (Tramways) Act 1900	63 & 64 Vict. c. cxxxv	30 July 1900
An Act to empower the Rawmarsh Urban District Council to construct and work tramways and to make street improvements and for other purposes.
Great Grimsby Street Tramways Act 1900 (repealed)	63 & 64 Vict. c. cxxxvi	30 July 1900
An Act to confer further powers upon the Great Grimsby Street Tramways Company with respect to the construction and working of tramways in the Borough of Grimsby and for other purposes. (Repealed by Humberside Act 1982 (c. iii))
Margate Pier and Harbour Act 1900 (repealed)	63 & 64 Vict. c. cxxxvii	30 July 1900
An Act to authorise the Company of Proprietors of the Margate Pier and Harbour to construct works to raise additional capital and for other purposes relating to the undertaking of the Company. (Repealed by Margate Pier and Harbour Revision Order 1992 (SI 1993/1313))
Great Indian Peninsula Railway Purchase Act 1900 (repealed)	63 & 64 Vict. c. cxxxviii	30 July 1900
An Act to provide for the vesting of the railways and other property of the Great Indian Peninsula Railway Company in the Secretary of State in Council of India and for other purposes. (Repealed by Statute Law (Repeals) Act 2013 (c. 2))
Great Northern Railway Act 1900	63 & 64 Vict. c. cxxxix	30 July 1900
An Act to confer further powers upon the Great Northern Railway Company.
Hastings Tramways Act 1900 (repealed)	63 & 64 Vict. c. cxl	30 July 1900
An Act to incorporate the Hastings Tramways Company and to empower that Company to make and maintain tramways and other works in the county borough of Hastings and for other purposes. (Repealed by Hastings Tramways Act 1957 (5 & 6 Eliz. 2. c. xxxvi))
Lambeth Waterworks Act 1900	63 & 64 Vict. c. cxli	30 July 1900
An Act to authorise the Company of Proprietors of Lambeth Waterworks to execute further works to purchase additional lands to take further water from the River Thames and to raise further money and for other purposes.
Lancashire, Derbyshire and East Coast Railway Act 1900	63 & 64 Vict. c. cxlii	30 July 1900
An Act to confer further powers on the Lancashire Derbyshire and East Coast Railway Company.
Midland Railway Act 1900	63 & 64 Vict. c. cxliii	30 July 1900
An Act to confer additional powers upon the Midland Railway Company and upon the Midland and North Eastern Railway Companies Committee and upon the Midland and Great Northern Railways Joint Committee for the construction of works and the acquisition of lands to empower the Midland Railway Company to subscribe towards the undertaking of the Yorkshire Dales Railway Company and for other purposes.
Bury and District Water (Transfer) Act 1900	63 & 64 Vict. c. cxliv	30 July 1900
An Act to constitute and incorporate a Joint Water Board consisting of representatives from the Councils of the respective Boroughs of Bury Haslingden and Rawtenstall and the Urban Districts of Radcliffe Ramsbottom Little Lever Whitefield and Tottington and the Rural District of Bury all in the County Palatine of Lancaster and to transfer to and vest in such Board the water undertaking of the Bury Corporation and for other purposes.
Preston Corporation Act 1900 (repealed)	63 & 64 Vict. c. cxlv	30 July 1900
An Act to alter the numbers and boundaries of the wards of the Borough of Preston and to enable the Mayor Aldermen and Burgesses of the said borough to reconstruct their existing and to construct additional tramways in and adjacent to the borough and to make further provisions for the good government of the borough. (Repealed by County of Lancashire Act 1984 (c. xxi))
London Sea Water Supply Act 1900	63 & 64 Vict. c. cxlvi	30 July 1900
An Act to confer further powers on the London Sea Water Supply Company.
South Eastern Metropolitan Tramways Act 1900	63 & 64 Vict. c. cxlvii	30 July 1900
An Act for conferring further powers on the South Eastern Metropolitan Tramways Company for using mechanical power on their tramways and for other purposes.
Portland Urban District (Gas, &c.) Act 1900	63 & 64 Vict. c. cxlviii	30 July 1900
An Act to empower the Urban District Council of Portland to supply gas and to provide for the transfer of the undertaking of Sir Richard Nicholas Howard as successor of the Portland Gas Light and Coke and Coal Company Limited to the Council and to make further provision in regard to the finance of the said district and for other purposes.
Burnley Corporation Act 1900	63 & 64 Vict. c. cxlix	30 July 1900
An Act to confer further powers upon the Corporation of Burnley and neighbouring authorities with respect to tramways and street improvements within and beyond the borough and for other purposes.
Glasgow Building Regulations Act 1900 (repealed)	63 & 64 Vict. c. cl	30 July 1900
An Act to amend and extend the provisions of the Glasgow Police Acts 1866 to 1899 relating to streets sewers and buildings. (Repealed by Glasgow Streets, Sewers and Buildings Consolidation Order Confirmation Act 1937 (1 Edw. 8 & 1 Geo. 6. c. xliii))
Motherwell and Bellshill Railway Act 1900 (repealed)	63 & 64 Vict. c. cli	30 July 1900
An Act for making and maintaining railways in the County of Lanark to be called the Motherwell and Bellshill Railway and for other purposes. (Repealed by Motherwell and Bellshill Railway (Abandonment) Order Confirmation Act 1904 (4 Edw. 7. c. cxxxiii) (Note: Incorrectly cited as "Motherwell and Bellshill Rly.(Abandonment) O.Confn. 1904 (c.cxxiii)" in the Chronological Table of Local Acts.))
North Eastern Railway (Steam Vessels) Act 1900	63 & 64 Vict. c. clii	30 July 1900
An Act to empower the North Eastern Railway Company to own and use vessels for the conveyance of traffic between Hull and Rotterdam Amsterdam and Harlingen and for other purposes.
Rotherham Corporation Act 1900	63 & 64 Vict. c. cliii	30 July 1900
An Act to confer further powers on the Corporation of Rotherham in regard to tramways street improvements water and gas supply and the local government of the Borough.
Glyncorrwg Urban District Council Gas Act 1900	63 & 64 Vict. c. cliv	30 July 1900
An Act to empower the Glyncorrwg Urban District Council to supply gas and to provide for the transfer to them of the part of the undertaking of the Llynvi Valley Gas Company situate in their district and for other purposes.
Barnsley Corporation (Water) Act 1900	63 & 64 Vict. c. clv	30 July 1900
An Act to empower the Corporation of Barnsley to make deviations in constructing the lines of pipes authorised by the Barnsley Corporation (Water) Act 1896 (Note: Barnsley Corporation (Water) Act 1896 (59 & 60 Vict. c. lii)) to transfer to them certain powers works and obligations granted or transferred to the Corporation of Sheffield by the Sheffield Corporation Water Act 1896 (Note: Sheffield Corporation Water Act 1896 (59 & 60 Vict. c. cxc)) and to extend the periods for the taking of lands and for the construction of works and for other purposes.
Dublin, Wicklow and Wexford Railway Act 1900	63 & 64 Vict. c. clvi	30 July 1900
An Act to confer further powers on the Dublin Wicklow and Wexford Railway Company for making works and acquiring lands and raising and applying capital moneys and other matters relating to their several undertakings and for other purposes.
Ramsgate Corporation Act 1900 (repealed)	63 & 64 Vict. c. clvii	30 July 1900
An Act to confer upon the Corporation of Ramsgate further powers with reference to the local government and improvement of the borough and for other purposes. (Repealed by County of Kent Act 1981 (c.xviii))
South Shields Corporation Act 1900	63 & 64 Vict. c. clviii	30 July 1900
An Act to confer powers upon the Corporation of the Borough of South Shields for the construction of street works and improvements and for other purposes.
Aberdeen Corporation Tramways Act 1900 (repealed)	63 & 64 Vict. c. clix	30 July 1900
An Act to authorise the Lord Provost Magistrates and Town Council of the City and Royal Burgh of Aberdeen to construct additional tramways and to make certain street improvements in connexion therewith and for other purposes. (Repealed by Aberdeen Corporation (Water, Gas, Electricity and Transport) Order Confirmation Act 1937 (1 Edw. 8 & 1 Geo. 6. c. cii))
Great Western Railway Act 1900	63 & 64 Vict. c. clx	30 July 1900
An Act for conferring further powers upon the Great Western Railway Company in respect of their own undertaking and upon that Company and the London and North-Western Railway Company in respect of undertakings in which they are jointly interested and upon the Great Western and Great Central Railways Joint Committee in respect of their undertaking for vesting the undertakings of the Staines and West Drayton and the Birmingham and Henley-in-Arden Railway Companies in the Great Western Railway Company for transferring to that Company the powers of the Birmingham North Warwickshire and Stratford-upon-Avon Railway Company and extending the time for the construction of certain authorised railways of that Company and for other purposes.
South Western Railway Act 1900	63 & 64 Vict. c. clxi	30 July 1900
An Act to confer further powers upon the London and South Western Railway Company and to authorise them to execute further works to acquire additional lands and to raise further money and to vary in certain respects the provisions of the South Western Railway Act 1899 (Note: South Western Railway Act 1899 (62 & 63 Vict. c. ccliii)) and for other purposes.
South Metropolitan Gas Act 1900	63 & 64 Vict. c. clxii	30 July 1900
An Act to empower the South Metropolitan Gas Company to alter the provisions as to the standard price and illuminating power of the gas supplied by the Company to construct a railway in the parish of Greenwich and for other purposes.
North Eastern Railway Act 1900	63 & 64 Vict. c. clxiii	30 July 1900
An Act to confer additional powers upon the North Eastern Railway Company for the construction of new railways and other works and the acquisition of additional lands and upon that Company and the London and North Western Railway Company in respect of the Leeds New Station and for vesting in the Company the Londonderry (Seaham to Sunderland) Railway the Cawood Wistow and Selby Light Railway and the Merrybent and Darlington Railway and for other purposes.
Crystal Palace Company's Act 1900 (repealed)	63 & 64 Vict. c. clxiv	30 July 1900
An Act to provide for the conversion of the capital stocks of the Crystal Palace Company into shares and to empower them to raise additional capital and for other purposes. (Repealed by London County Council (Crystal Palace) Act 1951 (14 & 15 Geo. 6. c. xxviii))
Roe's Patent Act 1900	63 & 64 Vict. c. clxv	30 July 1900
An Act for rendering valid certain Letters Patent granted to John Pearce Roe for an Invention for improvements in apparatus for shipping or transferring coal and other materials.
Electric Lighting Orders Confirmation (No. 6) Act 1900	63 & 64 Vict. c. clxvi	30 July 1900
An Act to confirm certain Provisional Orders made by the Board of Trade under the Electric Lighting Acts 1882 and 1888 relating to Barmouth Brecon Clacton Cleckheaton Hythe Liversedge Llandilo Ramsgate Romford and Sandgate.
	Barmouth Electric Lighting Order 1900	
	Brecon Electric Lighting Order 1900	
	Clacton Electric Lighting Order 1900	
	Cleckheaton Electric Lighting Order 1900	
	Hythe Electric Lighting Order 1900	
	Liversedge Electric Lighting Order 1900	
	Llandilo Electric Lighting Order 1900	
	Ramsgate Electric Lighting Order 1900	
	Romford Electric Lighting Order 1900	
	Sandgate Electric Supply Order 1900	
Electric Lighting Orders Confirmation (No. 7) Act 1900	63 & 64 Vict. c. clxvii	30 July 1900
An Act to confirm certain Provisional Orders made by the Board of Trade under the Electric Lighting Acts 1882 and 1888 relating to Berwick-upon-Tweed Harrow-on-the-Hill Malton the extension of the area of supply of the Midland Electric Corporation for Power Distribution (Limited) Newhaven Seaford Thirsk Totnes Witney and Woking.
	Berwick-upon-Tweed Electric Lighting Order 1900	
	Harrow-on-the-Hill Electric Lighting Order 1900	
	Malton Electric Lighting Order 1900	
	Midland Electric Power Distribution and Lighting (Extension) Order 1900	
	Newhaven Electric Lighting Order 1900	
	Seaford Electric Lighting Order 1900	
	Thirsk Electric Lighting Order 1900	
	Totnes Electric Lighting Order 1900	
	Witney Electric Lighting Order 1900	
	Woking Electric Supply Company Order 1900	
Electric Lighting Orders Confirmation (No. 8) Act 1900 (repealed)	63 & 64 Vict. c. clxviii	30 July 1900
An Act to confirm certain Provisional Orders made by the Board of Trade under the Electric Lighting Acts and 1888 and the Electric Lighting (Scotland) Act 1890 (Note: Electric Lighting (Scotland) Act 1890 (53 & 54 Vict. c. 13)) relating to Broughty Ferry Dunblane and Wormit and Woodhaven. (Repealed by North of Scotland Electricity Order Confirmation Act 1958 (7 & 8 Eliz. 2. c. ii))
Electric Lighting Orders Confirmation (No. 9) Act 1900	63 & 64 Vict. c. clxix	30 July 1900
An Act to confirm certain Provisional Orders made by the Board of Trade under the Electric Lighting Acts 1882 and 1888 relating to Barnard Castle Cheltenham (Extension) Freshwater and Totland District the Extension of the Area of Supply under the Newcastle-upon-Tyne Electric Lighting Order 1893 to Gosforth Jarrow Llanrwst Pwllheli Royal Leamington Spa Twickenham and Wallington.
	Barnard Castle Electric Lighting Order 1900	
	Cheltenham Electric Lighting (Extension to Charlton Kings) Order 1900	
	Freshwater and Totland (Isle of Wight) Electricity Supply Company Order 1900	
	Gosforth Electric Lighting Order 1900	
	Jarrow Electric Lighting Order 1900	
	Llanrwst Electric Lighting Order 1900	
	Pwllheli Electric Lighting Order 1900	
	Royal Leamington Spa Electric Lighting Order 1900	
	Twickenham Electric Lighting Order 1900	
	Wallington Electric Lighting Order 1900	
Electric Lighting Orders Confirmation (No. 12) Act 1900	63 & 64 Vict. c. clxx	30 July 1900
An Act to confirm certain Provisional Orders made by the Board of Trade under the Electric Lighting Acts 1882 and 1888 relating to Banbury Dartmouth Gosport and Ahrerstoke Heston and Isleworth Sevenoaks Sheerness Spennymoor Staines Egham and Chertsey Stamford Uxbridge and District and Wellingborough.
	Banbury Electric Lighting Order 1900	
	Dartmouth Electric Lighting Order 1900	
	Gosport and Alverstoke Electric Lighting Order 1900	
	Heston and Isleworth Electric Lighting Order 1900	
	Sheerness Electric Lighting Order 1900	
	Spennymoor Electric Lighting Order 1900	
	Staines, Egham and Chertsey Electric Lighting Order 1900	
	Stamford Electric Lighting Order 1900	
	Uxbridge and District Electricity Supply Order 1900	
Gas Orders Confirmation (No. 1) Act 1900	63 & 64 Vict. c. clxxi	30 July 1900
An Act to confirm certain Provisional Orders made by the Board of Trade under the Gas and Water Works Facilities Act 1870 relating to Abergele Gas Irthlingborough Gas Littlehampton Gas Lymington Gas Mablethorpe and Sutton Gas and Romford Gas.
	Abergele Gas Order 1900	
	Irthlingborough Gas Order 1900	
	Littlehampton Gas Order 1900	
	Lymington Gas Order 1900	
	Mablethorpe and Sutton (Lincs.) Gas Order 1900	
	Mablethorpe and Sutton Gas Order 1900	
	Romford Gas Order 1900	
Gas Order Confirmation (No. 3) Act 1900 (repealed)	63 & 64 Vict. c. clxxii	30 July 1900
An Act to confirm a Provisional Order made by the Board of Trade under the Gas and Water Works Facilities Act 1870 relating to Wath-upon-Dearne and District Gas. (Repealed by Statute Law (Repeals) Act 1989 (c. 43))
Water Orders Confirmation Act 1900	63 & 64 Vict. c. clxxiii	30 July 1900
An Act to confirm certain Provisional Orders made by the Board of Trade under the Gas and Water Works Facilities Act 1870 relating to East Surrey Water Hayling Water Maidenhead Water Sevenoaks Water South-West Suburban Water and Tonbridge Water.
	East Surrey Water Order 1900	
	Hayling Water Order 1900	
	Maidenhead Water Order 1900	
	Sevenoaks Water Order 1900	
	South West Suburban Water Order 1900	
	Tonbridge Water Order 1900	
Local Government Board's Provisional Orders Confirmation (No. 1) Act 1900	63 & 64 Vict. c. clxxiv	30 July 1900
An Act to confirm certain Provisional Orders of the Local Government Board relating to Accrington Chipping Norton Gosport and Alverstoke Kingswinford (Rural) Newport Pagnell and Wirral (Rural).
	Accrington Order 1900	
	Chipping Norton Order 1900	
	Gosport and Alverstoke Order 1900	
	Kingswinford Order 1900	
	Newport Pagnell Order 1900	
	Wirral Order 1900	
Local Government Board's Provisional Orders Confirmation (No. 5) Act 1900	63 & 64 Vict. c. clxxv	30 July 1900
An Act to confirm certain Provisional Orders of the Local Government Board relating to Abergele and Pensarn Bradford-on-Avon Dorking (Rural) Haworth Henley (Rural) Hove Manchester and Wokingham (Rural).
	Abergele and Pensarn Order 1900	
	Bradford-on-Avon Order 1900	
	Dorking Order 1900	
	Haworth Order 1900	
	Henley Order 1900	
	Hove Order 1900	
	Manchester Order 1900	
	Wokingham Order 1900	
Local Government Board's Provisional Orders Confirmation (No. 6) Act 1900	63 & 64 Vict. c. clxxvi	30 July 1900
An Act to confirm certain Provisional Orders of the Local Government Board relating to Atherton Barmouth Clitheroe Leicester Stafford and Teignmouth.
	Atherton Order 1900	
	Barmouth Order 1900	
	Clitheroe Order 1900	
	Leicester Order 1900	
	Stafford Order 1900	
	Teignmouth Order 1900	
Local Government Board's Provisional Orders Confirmation (No. 8) Act 1900	63 & 64 Vict. c. clxxvii	30 July 1900
An Act to confirm certain Provisional Orders of the Local Government Board relating to Cuckfield (Rural) Leigh Milford Haven and Wallasey.
	Cuckfield Order 1900	
	Leigh Order 1900	
	Milford Haven Order 1900	
	Wallasey Order 1900	
Local Government Board's Provisional Orders Confirmation (No. 9) Act 1900	63 & 64 Vict. c. clxxviii	30 July 1900
An Act to confirm certain Provisional Orders of the Local Government Board relating to Burton-upon-Trent Dorchester the Parts of Kesteven Warrington and Winchester.
	Burton-upon-Trent Order 1900	
	Dorchester Order 1900	
	County of the Parts of Kesteven Order 1900	
	Warrington Order 1900	
	Winchester Order 1900	
Local Government Board's Provisional Orders Confirmation (No. 10) Act 1900	63 & 64 Vict. c. clxxix	30 July 1900
An Act to confirm certain Provisional Orders of the Local Government Board relating to Harrogate Heywood Ripon Rochdale and Tunbridge Wells.
	Harrogate (Extension) Order 1900	
	Heywood Order 1900	
	Ripon Order 1900	
	Rochdale Order 1900	
	Tunbridge Wells Order 1900	
Local Government Board's Provisional Orders Confirmation (No. 11) Act 1900	63 & 64 Vict. c. clxxx	30 July 1900
An Act to confirm certain Provisional Orders of the Local Government Board relating to Barrow-upon-Soar (Rural) Bootle and Ongar (Rural) and the Doncaster and Mexborough and the Shepley and Shelley United Districts.
	Barrow-upon Soar Rural Order 1900	
	Bootle Order 1900	
	Ongar Rural Order 1900	
	Doncaster and Mexborough Joint Hospital Order 1900	
	Shepley and Shelley Joint Sewerage Order 1900	
Local Government Board's Provisional Orders Confirmation (No. 12) Act 1900	63 & 64 Vict. c. clxxxi	30 July 1900
An Act to confirm certain Provisional Orders of the Local Government Board relating to Lancaster Ossett and Wakefield.
	Lancaster Order 1900 Provisional Order made in pursuance of Sections 54 and 59 of the Local Government Act 1888. (Note: Local Government Act 1888 (51 & 52 Vict. c. 41))	
	Ossett Order 1900 Provisional Order made in pursuance of Sections 54 and 59 of the Local Government Act 1888.	
	Wakefield Order 1900 Provisional Order made in pursuance of Sections 54 and 59 of the Local Government Act 1888.	
Local Government Board's Provisional Orders Confirmation (No. 13) Act 1900	63 & 64 Vict. c. clxxxii	30 July 1900
An Act to confirm certain Provisional Orders of the Local Government Board relating to Ashton-under-Lyne Bury Leyton Shipley and Sunderland.
	Ashton-under-Lyne Order 1900 Provisional Order for altering the Ashton-under-Lyne Corporation Act, 1893. (Note: Ashton-under-Lyne Corporation Act 1893 (56 & 57 Vict. c. cxcv))	
	Bury Order 1900 Provisional Order for altering certain Local Acts.	
	Leyton Order 1900 Provisional Order to enable the Urban District Council of Leyton to put in force the Compulsory Clauses of the Lands Clauses Acts.	
	Shipley Order 1900 Provisional Order for the alteration of the Shipley Local Government Act 1874. (Note: Shipley Local Government Act 1874 (37 & 38 Vict. c. cvii))	
	Sunderland Order 1900 Provisional Order for altering the Borough of Sunderland Act 1885. (Note: Borough of Sunderland Act 1885 (48 & 49 Vict. c. clxxxiii))	
Local Government Board's Provisional Orders Confirmation (No. 14) Act 1900	63 & 64 Vict. c. clxxxiii	30 July 1900
An Act to confirm certain Provisional Orders of the Local Government Board relating to Gloucester Northampton and Torquay and to the Walton-upon-Trent Bridge in the Counties of Derby and Stafford.
	Gloucester (Extension) Order 1900 Provisional Order made in pursuance of Sections 54 and 59 of the Local Government Act 1888.	
	Northampton (Extension) Order 1900 Provisional Order made in pursuance of Sections 54 and 59 of the Local Government Act 1888.	
	Torquay (Extension) Order 1900 Provisional Order made in pursuance of Sections 54 and 59 of the Local Government Act 1888.	
	Walton-upon-Trent Bridge Order 1900 Provisional Order under Section 10 of the Local Government Act 1888.	
Local Government Board's Provisional Orders Confirmation (Poor Law) Act 1900	63 & 64 Vict. c. clxxxiv	30 July 1900
An Act to confirm certain Provisional Orders of the Local Government Board relating to the Hursley Union and the Parish of Saint Mary Magdalen Bermondsey.
	Hursley Union Order 1900 Provisional Order made in pursuance of sub-section (3) of Section 2 of the Poor Law Act 1889. (Note: Poor Law Act 1889 (52 & 53 Vict. c. 56))	
	Saint Mary Magdalen Bermondsey Order 1900 Provisional Order for partially repealing and altering a Local Act. (Note: Bermondsey Poor Relief Act 1791 (31 Geo. 3. c. 19))	
Local Government Board's Provisional Orders Confirmation (Housing of Working Classes) Act 1900	63 & 64 Vict. c. clxxxv	30 July 1900
An Act to confirm a Provisional Order of the Local Government Board relating to Bath.
	Bath Order 1900 Provisional Order for confirming an Improvement Scheme under Part I. of the Housing of the Working Classes Act 1890. (Note: Housing of the Working Classes Act 1890 (53 & 54 Vict. c. 70))	
London (Clerkenwell and Holborn) Provisional Order Confirmation Act 1900	63 & 64 Vict. c. clxxxvi	30 July 1900
An Act to confirm a Provisional Order made by one of Her Majesty's Principal Secretaries of State for improving certain Areas situated in the Parishes of St. James and St John Clerkenwell and St. Andrew Holborn in the County of London.
	London (Clerkenwell and Holborn) Improvement Scheme 1900 Provisional Order for confirming the London (Clerkenwell and Holborn) Improvement Scheme 1900.	
London (Poplar) Provisional Order Confirmation Act 1900	63 & 64 Vict. c. clxxxvii	30 July 1900
An Act to confirm a Provisional Order made by one of Her Majesty's Principal Secretaries of State for improving certain Areas situated in the Parishes of Poplar and Bromley-by-Bow in the County of London.
	London (Poplar) Improvement Scheme 1900 Provisional Order for confirming the London (Poplar) Improvement Scheme 1900.	
London (St. Luke) Provisional Order Confirmation Act 1900	63 & 64 Vict. c. clxxxviii	30 July 1900
An Act to confirm a Provisional Order made by one of Her Majesty's Principal Secretaries of State for improving certain Areas situated in the Parish of St. Luke in the County of London.
	London (St. Luke) Improvement Scheme 1900 Provisional Order for confirming the London (St. Luke) Improvement Scheme 1900.	
London (Southwark) Provisional Order Confirmation Act 1900	63 & 64 Vict. c. clxxxix	30 July 1900
An Act to confirm a Provisional Order made by one of Her Majesty's Principal Secretaries of State for improving certain Areas situated in the Parish of St. George the Martyr Southwark in the County of London.
	London (Southwark) Improvement Scheme 1900 Provisional Order for confirming the London (Southwark) Improvement Scheme 1900.	
Local Government Board (Ireland) Provisional Orders Confirmation (No. 3) Act 1900	63 & 64 Vict. c. cxc	30 July 1900
An Act to confirm certain Provisional Orders of the Local Government Board for Ireland relating to the Urban Districts of Clones Londonderry Monaghan Pembroke Rathmines and Rathgar and Wicklow and the Rural Districts of Dungarvan and Rathdrum.
	Clones Sewerage Provisional Order 1900 Clones Sewerage Works. Provisional Order.	
	Londonderry Provisional Order 1900 County Borough of Londonderry. Provisional Order.	
	Monaghan Waterworks Provisional Order 1900 Monaghan Waterworks. Provisional Order.	
	Rathmines and Pembroke Joint Hospital Order 1900 Pembroke Urban District. Provisional Order.	
	Ballynacourty Waterworks Provisional Order 1900 Rathmines and Pembroke Joint Hospital District. Provisional Order.	
	Rathdrum and Wicklow Joint Burial Board Order 1900 Ballynacourty Waterworks. Provisional Order.	
Local Government Board (Ireland) Provisional Orders Confirmation (Housing of Working Classes) Act 1900	63 & 64 Vict. c. cxci	30 July 1900
An Act to confirm certain Provisional Orders of the Local Government Board for Ireland relating to the Urban District of Navan and the Towns of Boyle and Newbridge.
	Navan Provisional Order 1900 Navan Urban District Council. Provisional Order.	
	Boyle Provisional Order 1900 Town of Boyle. Provisional Order.	
	Newbridge Provisional Order 1900 Town of Newbridge. Provisional Order.	
Local Government Board (Ireland) Provisional Orders Confirmation (Housing of Working Classes) (No. 2) Act 1900	63 & 64 Vict. c. cxcii	30 July 1900
An Act to confirm certain Provisional Orders of the Local Government Board for Ireland relating to Bray.
	Bray Provisional Order (No. 1) 1900 Confirming an Improvement Scheme under Part I. of the Housing of the Working Classes Act 1890.	
	Bray Provisional Order (No. 2) 1900 Bray Urban District. Provisional Order No. 2.	
Pier and Harbour Orders Confirmation (No. 2) Act 1900	63 & 64 Vict. c. cxciii	30 July 1900
An Act to confirm certain Provisional Orders made by the Board of Trade under the General Pier and Harbour Act 1861 relating to Ayr Bridlington Felixstowe and Penryn.
	Ayr Promenade Pier Order 1900 Prorisional Order for the construction and maintenance of a pier and works at Ayr in the county of Ayr.	
	Bridlington Pier Order 1900 Provisional Order for the Construction Maintenance and Regulation of a Pier and Works at Bridlington in the East Riding of the County of York.	
	Felixstowe Pier Order 1900 Provisional Order for the Construction Maintenance and Regulation of a Pier and Works at Felixstowe in the County of Suffolk.	
	Penryn Harbour Order 1900 Provisional Order for the Construction of Further Works in Penryn Harbour and for conferring further Powers upon the Mayor Aldermen and Burgesses of the Borough of Penryn in the County of Cornwall in relation to that Harbour.	
Perth and Paisley Gas Orders Confirmation Act 1900	63 & 64 Vict. c. cxciv	30 July 1900
An Act to confirm certain Provisional Orders under the Burgh Police (Scotland) Act 1892 relating to Perth and Paisley.
	Perth Gas Order 1900 Burgh of Perth.	
	Paisley Gas Order 1900 Burgh of Paisley.	
Local Government Board's Provisional Orders Confirmation (No. 7) Act 1900	63 & 64 Vict. c. cxcv	6 August 1900
An Act to confirm certain Provisional Orders of the Local Government Board relating to the Accrington and Church Outfall Sewerage District and to Acton Chester (Rural) Reigate Weymouth (Rural) and Wigan (Rural).
	Accrington and Church Order 1900 Provisional Order to enable the Accrington and Church Outfall Sewerage Board to put in force the Compulsory Clauses of the Lands Clauses Acts.	
	Acton Order 1900 Provisional Order to enable the Urban District Council of Acton to put in force the Compulsory Clauses of the Lands Clauses Acts.	
	Chester Rural Order 1900 Provisional Order to enable the Rural District Council of Chester to put in force the Compulsory Clauses of the Lands Clauses Acts.	
	Reigate Order 1900 Provisional Order to enable the Urban District Council for the Borough of Reigate to put in force the Compulsory Clauses of the Lands Clauses Acts.	
	Weymouth Rural Order 1900 Provisional Order to enable the Rural District Council of Weymouth to put in force the Compulsory Clauses of the Lands Clauses Acts.	
	Wigan Rural Order 1900 Provisional Order to enable the Rural District Council of Wigan to put in force the Compulsory Clauses of the Lands Clauses Acts.	
Local Government Board's Provisional Orders Confirmation (No. 15) Act 1900	63 & 64 Vict. c. cxcvi	6 August 1900
An Act to confirm certain Provisional Orders of the Local Government Board relating to the Birmingham Tame and Rea Main Sewerage District and to Leeds and Wolverhampton.
	Birmingham Tame and Rea Main Sewerage Order 1900 Provisional Order for partially repealing and altering certain Confirming Acts.	
	Leeds Order 1900 Provisional Order to enable the Urban Sanitary Authority for the City of Leeds to put in force the Compulsory Clauses of the Lands Clauses Acts.	
	Wolverhampton Order 1900 Provisional Order for altering the Wolverhampton Improvement Act 1869. (Note: Wolverhampton Improvement Act 1869 (32 & 33 Vict. c. cxxxi))	
Education Board Provisional Order Confirmation (London) Act 1900	63 & 64 Vict. c. cxcvii	6 August 1900
An Act to confirm a Provisional Order made by the Board of Education under the Elementary Education Acts 1870 to 1899 to enable the School Board for London to put in force the Lands Clauses Acts.
	School Board for London Order 1900 Provisional Order for putting in force the Lands Clauses Acts.	
Tramways Orders Confirmation (No. 1) Act 1900	63 & 64 Vict. c. cxcviii	6 August 1900
An Act to confirm certain Provisional Orders made by the Board of Trade under the Tramways Act 1870 (Note: Tramways Act 1870 (33 & 34 Vict. c. 78)) relating to Bredbury and Romiley Urban District Council Tramways Huddersfield Corporation Tramways Hurst Urban District Council Tramways Kearsley Urban District Council Tramways Prestwich Urban District Council Tramways Reddish Urban District Council Tramways and Wigan Corporation Tramways.
	Bredbury and Romiley Urban District Council Tramways Order 1900 Order authorising the Urban District Council of Bredbury and Romiley to construct a Tramway in their District and for other purposes.	
	Huddersfield Corporation Tramways Order 1900 Order authorising the Mayor Aldermen and Burgesses of the Borough of Huddersfield to construct an additional Tramway in the said Borough.	
	Hurst Urban District Council Tramways Order 1900 Order authorising the Urban District Council of Hurst to construct Tramways in their District.	
	Kearsley Urban District Council Tramways Order 1900 Order authorising the Urban District Council of Kearsley to construct Additional Tramways in their District and for other purposes.	
	Prestwich Urban District Council Tramways Order 1900 Order authorising the Council for the Urban District of Prestwich in the County of Lancaster to construct Tramways in the said Urban District.	
	Reddish Urban District Council Tramways Order 1900 Order authorising the Urban District Council of Reddish to construct Tramways in their District and for other purposes.	
	Wigan Corporation Tramways Order 1900 Order authorising the Mayor Aldermen and Burgesses of the Borough of Wigan to construct additional Tramways in their Borough.	
Tramways Orders Confirmation (No. 2) Act 1900	63 & 64 Vict. c. cxcix	6 August 1900
An Act to confirm certain Provisional Orders made by the Board of Trade under the Tramways Act 1870 relating to Bedford Corporation Tramways Bootle Corporation Tramways Radcliffe Urban District Council Tramways St. Helens Corporation Tramways and Warwick Tramways.
	Bedford Corporation Tramways Order 1900 Order authorising the Mayor Aldermen and Burgesses of the Borough of Bedford to construct Tramways and for other purposes.	
	Bootle Corporation Tramways Order 1900 Order authorising the Mayor Aldermen and Burgesses of the Borough of Bootle to construct additional Tramways in their Borough.	
	Radcliffe Urban District Council Tramways Order 1900 Order authorising the Urban District Council of Radcliffe to construct Tramways in their District and for other purposes.	
	St. Helens Corporation Tramways Order 1900 Order authorising the Mayor Aldermen and Burgesses of the Borough of St. Helens to construct additional Tramways in their Borough.	
	Warwick Tramways Order 1900 Order authorising the alteration of the gauge of so much of the Tramways of the Leamington and Warwick Tramways and Omnibus Company Limited as is situate in the Borough of Warwick and the working of the same by mechanical power.	
Tramways Orders Confirmation (No. 3) Act 1900	63 & 64 Vict. c. cc	6 August 1900
An Act to confirm certain Provisional Orders made by the Board of Trade under the Tramways Act 1870 relating to Batley Corporation Tramways Camborne and Redruth Tramway East Ham Urban District Council Tramways Hull Corporation Tramways Middleton Corporation Tramways Portobello and Musselburgh Tramways and Southampton Corporation Tramways.
	Batley Corporation Tramways Order 1900 Order authorising the Mayor Aldermen and Burgesses of the Borough of Batley to construct Tramways in the said Borough.	
	Camborne and Redruth Tramway Order 1900 Order authorising the Urban Electric Supply Company Limited to construct a Tramway in the Parish and Urban District of Camborne in the Parish and Urban District of Redruth and in the Parish of Illogan in the Rural District of Redruth all in the County of Cornwall.	
	East Ham Urban District Council Tramways Order 1900 Order authorising the Urban District Council of East Ham to construct additional Tramways in their District and for other purposes.	
	Hull Corporation Tramways Order 1900 Order authorising the Mayor Aldermen and Citizens of the City and County of Kingston-upon-Hull to construct additional Tramways in their City and for other purposes.	
	Middleton Corporation Tramways Order 1900 Order authorising the Mayor Aldermen and Burgesses of the Borough of Middleton to construct Tramways and for other purposes.	
	Portobello and Musselburgh Tramways Order 1900 Order authorising the National Electric Traction Company Limited (formerly known as the Drake and Gorham Electric Power and Traction Company Limited) to construct and work Tramways in the Parishes of Duldingston and Inveresk in the Burgh of Musselburgh in the County of Midlothian and for other purposes.	
	Southampton Corporation Tramways Order 1900 Order authorising the Mayor Aldermen and Burgesses of the Borough of Southampton to construct additional Tramways in the said Borough.	
Tramways Orders Confirmation (No. 4) Act 1900	63 & 64 Vict. c. cci	6 August 1900
An Act to confirm certain Provisional Orders made by the Board of Trade under the Tramways Act 1870 relating to Ashton-under-Lyne Corporation Tramways Garston Tramway Gorton Urban District Council Tramways Plymouth Corporation Tramways Taunton Tramways and Warrington Corporation Tramways.
	Ashton-under-Lyne Corporation Tramways Order 1900 Order authorising the Mayor Aldermen and Burgesses of the Borough of Ashton-under-Lyne to construct Tramways in their Borough.	
	Garston Tramways Order 1900 Order authorising the Garston and District Tramways Company Limited to construct a Tramway in the Urban District of Garston.	
	Gorton Urban District Council Tramways Order 1900 Order authorising the Urban District Council of Gorton to construct Tramways in their District.	
	Plymouth Corporation Tramways Order 1900 Order authorising the Mayor Aldermen and Burgesses of the Plymouth Borough of Plymouth to construct additional Tramways in their Borough.	
	Taunton Tramways Order 1900 Order authorising the Construction of Tramways in the Borough of Taunton in the County of Somerset.	
	Warrington Corporation Tramways Order 1900 Order authorising the Mayor Aldermen and Burgesses of the Warrington Borough of Warrington to construct Tramways and for other purposes.	
London (St. Marylebone) Provisional Order Confirmation Act 1900	63 & 64 Vict. c. ccii	6 August 1900
An Act to confirm a Provisional Order made by one of Her Majesty’s Principal Secretaries of State for the Improvement of a certain Area situated in the Parish of St. Marylebone in the County of London.
	London (St. Marylebone) Improvement Scheme 1900 Provisional Order for confirming the London (St. Marylebone) Improvement Scheme 1900.	
Paisley Waterworks Provisional Order Confirmation Act 1900	63 & 64 Vict. c. cciii	6 August 1900
An Act to confirm a Provisional Order under the Burgh Police (Scotland) Act 1892 relating to Paisley Waterworks.
	Paisley Waterworks Provisional Order 1900 Provisional Order.	
Edinburgh Improvement Scheme Provisional Orders Confirmation Act 1900	63 & 64 Vict. c. cciv	6 August 1900
An Act to confirm a Provisional Order made by the Secretary for Scotland under Part I. of the Housing of the Working Classes Act 1890 relating to the City and Royal Burgh of Edinburgh.
	Edinburgh (Housing of Working Classes) Improvement Order 1900 Provisional Order for confirming an Improvement Scheme under Part I. of the Housing of the Working Classes Act 1890.	
Local Government Board (Ireland) Provisional Orders Confirmation (No. 4) Act 1900 (repealed)	63 & 64 Vict. c. ccv	6 August 1900
An Act to confirm certain Provisional Orders of the Local Government Board for Ireland relating to Dublin and Belfast. (Repealed by Plant Health Act (Northern Ireland) 1967 (c. 28 (N.I.)))
	Dublin Port Sanitary Order 1900 Dublin Port Sanitary Authority. Provisional Order.	
	Belfast Port Sanitary Order 1900 Belfast Port Sanitary Authority. Provisional Order.	
Post Office (Sites) Act 1900 (repealed)	63 & 64 Vict. c. ccvi	6 August 1900
An Act to enable Her Majesty's Postmaster-General to acquire lands in London Bristol Ilford Sheffield and Southampton for the Public Service and for other purposes. (Repealed by Postal Services Act 2000 (Consequential Modifications to Local Enactments) Order 2003 (SI 2003/1542))
Electric Lighting Orders Confirmation (No. 10) Act 1900	63 & 64 Vict. c. ccvii	6 August 1900
An Act to confirm certain Provisional Orders made by the Board of Trade under the Electric Lighting Acts 1882 and 1888 relating to Battersea Limehouse Mile End Old Town and St. George-in-the-East.
	Battersea Electric Lighting Order 1900 Provisional Order granted by the Board of Trade under the Electric Lighting Acts 1882 and 1888 to the County of London and Brush Provincial Electric Lighting Company Limited in respect of part of the Parish of St. Mary Battersea in the County of London.	
	Limehouse District Electric Lighting Order 1900 Provisional Order granted by the Board of Trade under the Electric Lighting Acts 1882 and 1888 to the Board of Works for the Limehouse District in respect of the Limehouse District in the County of London.	
	St. George-in-the-East Electric Lighting Order 1900 Provisional Order granted by the Board of Trade under the Electric Lighting Acts 1882 and 1888 to the Vestry of the Hamlet of Mile End Old Town in respect of the Hamlet of Mile End Old Town in the County of London.	
Tramways Orders Confirmation (No. 5) Act 1900	63 & 64 Vict. c. ccviii	6 August 1900
An Act to confirm certain Provisional Orders made by the Board of Trade under the Tramways Act 1870 relating to Bournemouth Corporation Tramways Houghton-le-Spring and District Tramways Liverpool Corporation Tramways Extensions Portsmouth Corporation Tramways Rothesay Tramways Weston-super-Mare Tramways and Whitefield Urban District Council Tramways.
	Bournemouth Corporation Tramways Order 1900 Order authorising the Mayor Aldermen and Burgesses of the Borough of Bournemouth to construct Tramways in their Borough.	
	Houghton-Le-Spring and District Tramways Order 1900 Order authorising the construction of Tramways by the United Kingdom Tramway Light Railway and Electrical Syndicate Limited in the Urban Districts of Hetton and Houghton-le-Spring and in the Rural Districts of Easington Houghton-le-Spring and Sunderland all in the County of Durham and for other purposes.	
	Liverpool Corporation Tramways Extensions Order 1900 Order authorising the Mayor Aldermen and Citizens of the City of Liverpool to construct additional Tramways in the said City.	
	Portsmouth Corporation Tramways Order 1900 Order authorising the Mayor Aldermen and Burgesses of the Borough of Portsmouth to construct additional Tramways in the said Borough and for other purposes.	
	Rothesay Tramways Order 1900 Order authorising the Rothesay Tramways Company Limited to alter and adapt their Tramways for working and to work the same by Mechanical Power.	
	Weston-Super-Mare Tramways Order 1900 Order authorising the construction of Tramways in the Urban District of Weston-super-Mare in the County of Somerset.	
	Whitefield Urban District Council Tramways Order 1900 Order authorising the Urban District Council of Whitefield to construct Tramways in their District.	
North British Railway (General Powers) Act 1900	63 & 64 Vict. c. ccix	6 August 1900
An Act to authorise the North British Railway Company to construct certain new railways widenings and other works to confer further powers upon the Company and upon other Companies in connexion with their respective undertakings to amalgamate the Aberlady Gullane and North Berwick Railway Company the Newport Railway Company and the Eyemouth Railway Company with the Company to transfer to and vest in the Company the undertaking of the Borrowstounness Harbour Commissioners to enable the Burntisland Harbour Commissioners to borrow and the Company to advance them further money to authorise the Company to enter into working and other agreements with the Invergarry and Fort Augustus Railway Company to raise additional capital and for other purposes.
Costa Rica Railway Company Act 1900	63 & 64 Vict. c. ccx	6 August 1900
An Act for authorising the Costa Rica Railway Company Limited to borrow further moneys and to make provision in reference thereto and for other purposes.
Blackpool, St. Anne's and Lytham Tramways Act 1900 (repealed)	63 & 64 Vict. c. ccxi	6 August 1900
An Act to authorise the Blackpool St. Anne’s and Lytham Tramways Company Limited to construct tramways in substitution for their existing tramways in the County Palatine of Lancaster and for other purposes. (Repealed by Lytham St. Anne's Corporation Act 1923 (13 & 14 Geo. 5. c. lxxxvi))
East London Waterworks Act 1900	63 & 64 Vict. c. ccxii	6 August 1900
An Act to authorise the East London Waterworks Company to construct additional storage reservoirs and other works to take further water from the River Thames in cases of exceptional drought and other emergency to raise further money and for other purposes.
Ilfracombe Improvement Act 1900	63 & 64 Vict. c. ccxiii	6 August 1900
An Act to authorise the Urban District Council of Ilfracombe in the County of Devon to construct additional waterworks for the supply of their district and the parishes of Berrynarbor Combe Martin and Morthoe and to make further and better provision for the improvement health local government and finance of the district and for other purposes.
London and North Western Railway (Wales) Act 1900	63 & 64 Vict. c. ccxiv	6 August 1900
An Act for conferring further powers upon the London and North Western Railway Company for the construction of works and acquisition of lands in Wales and for other purposes.
London and North Western Railway Act 1900	63 & 64 Vict. c. ccxv	6 August 1900
An Act for empowering the-London and North Western Railway Company to construct works and for conferring further powers upon that Company in relation to their own undertaking and upon that Company and the Great Western Railway Company and the Great Central Railway Company in relation to their joint undertakings and for other purposes.
London County Council (Money) Act 1900 (repealed)	63 & 64 Vict. c. ccxvi	6 August 1900
An Act to regulate the expenditure of money by the London County Council on capital account during the current financial period and the raising of money to meet such expenditure. (Repealed by London County Council (Finance Consolidation) Act 1912 (2 & 3 Geo. 5. c. cv))
Buenos Aires and Rosario Railway Act 1900	63 & 64 Vict. c. ccxvii	6 August 1900
An Act to amend and extend the Memorandum of Association of the Buenos Ayres and Rosario Railway Company Limited with reference to the acquisition of railways and for other purposes.
Ipswich Corporation (Tramways, &c) Act 1900	63 & 64 Vict. c. ccxviii	6 August 1900
An Act to authorise the Mayor Aldermen and Burgesses of the Borough of Ipswich to construct tramways and street improvements and for other purposes.
Thames Tunnel (Rotherhithe and Ratcliff) Act 1900	63 & 64 Vict. c. ccxix	6 August 1900
An Act to empower the London County Council to make a tunnel or subway under the River Thames between Rotherhithe and Ratcliff and approaches thereto and for other purposes connected therewith.
Salford Corporation Act 1900	63 & 64 Vict. c. ccxx	6 August 1900
An Act to enable the Mayor Aldermen and Burgesses of the Borough of Salford to make street improvements to construct sewers and to raise additional moneys by mortgage and by the creation and issue of stock and to make further provisions for the good government of the borough.
Withington Urban District Council Act 1900	63 & 64 Vict. c. ccxxi	6 August 1900
An Act to empower the Urban District Council for the District of Withington to construct tramways and to make various street improvements and for other purposes.
Sheffield Corporation Act 1900 (repealed)	63 & 64 Vict. c. ccxxii	6 August 1900
An Act to extend the boundaries of the City of Sheffield to consolidate certain of the Townships within the said City to empower the Mayor Aldermen and Citizens of the said City to construct additional lines of tramways and to execute various street widenings and other works to make further and better provision for the improvement health and good government of the City and for other purposes. (Repealed by Sheffield Corporation Act 1912 (2 & 3 Geo. 5. c. clxvii))
Clontarf Urban District Council Act 1900	63 & 64 Vict. c. ccxxiii	6 August 1900
An Act to authorise the Clontarf Urban District Council to construct a sea wall to acquire lands to borrow moneys and for other purposes.
Aberdeen Police and Improvement Act 1900 (repealed)	63 & 64 Vict. c. ccxxiv	6 August 1900
An Act to authorise the Lord Provost Magistrates and Town Council of the City and Royal Burgh of Aberdeen to make certain bridge and street improvements to confer upon them new powers with respect to police matters streets and buildings and for other purposes. (Repealed by Aberdeen Corporation (Administration Finance, &c.) Order Confirmation Act 1940 (3 & 4 Geo. 6. c. iii))
Baker Street and Waterloo Railway Act 1900	63 & 64 Vict. c. ccxxv	6 August 1900
An Act to confer further powers upon the Baker Street and Waterloo Railway Company.
Bradford Corporation (Tramways, Gas and Various Powers) Act 1900 (repealed)	63 & 64 Vict. c. ccxxvi	6 August 1900
An Act to authorise the Mayor Aldermen and Citizens of the City of Bradford in the County of York to construct additional tramways in and near the city to acquire lands for the protection of their water supply to purchase the undertaking of the North Bierley Gas Company to make further provision for the health and good government of the City and for other purposes. (Repealed by West Yorkshire Act 1980 (c. xiv))
Charing Cross Electricity Supply Corporation (Further Powers) Act 1900	63 & 64 Vict. c. ccxxvii	6 August 1900
An Act to empower the Charing Cross and Strand Electricity Supply Corporation Limited to construct a generating station in the Parish of West Ham and to lay mains connecting their generating stations and to acquire lands and to construct a short line of railway and for other purposes.
City of London (Various Powers) Act 1900	63 & 64 Vict. c. ccxxviii	6 August 1900
An Act to empower the Corporation of the City of London to acquire and maintain Finsbury Circus Gardens as an open space and to purchase lands for various purposes and to adopt and apply the Baths and Washhouses Acts to establish a crematorium at Ilford Cemetery to make further and better accommodation for the laying of pipes wires and other apparatus in over or under streets to confer further powers upon the Corporation with respect to the control of streets and structures across streets and the fixing of apparatus for public lighting in streets to make further provisions for the health and good government of the City to enable persons elected to Corporate Offices in the City to retire therefrom to empower the Corporation to borrow money and for other purposes.
Croydon Corporation Act 1900 (repealed)	63 & 64 Vict. c. ccxxix	6 August 1900
An Act to authorise the Corporation of Croydon to construct additional tramways and to work the tramways in the borough to execute certain street improvements to make further provision for the government and for the preservation of the health of the inhabitants of the County Borough of Croydon and for other purposes. (Repealed by Croydon Corporation Act 1960 (8 & 9 Eliz. 2. c. xl))
County of Cumberland (Bridges) Act 1900	63 & 64 Vict. c. ccxxx	6 August 1900
An Act to transfer certain public bridges in the parish of Crosthwaite in the County of Cumberland to the Cumberland County Council and other authorities and for other purposes.
County of Durham Electric Power Supply Act 1900	63 & 64 Vict. c. ccxxxi	6 August 1900
An Act for incorporating and conferring powers upon the County of Durham Electric Power Supply Company and for other purposes.
Exeter Corporation Act 1900 (repealed)	63 & 64 Vict. c. ccxxxii	6 August 1900
An Act to extend the City and County of the City of Exeter to unite the parishes within the City into one parish to authorise the reconstruction of the Exe Bridge and the construction of certain street works and for other purposes. (Repealed by Exeter City Council Act 1987 (c. xi))
Farnworth Urban District Council Act 1900	63 & 64 Vict. c. ccxxxiii	6 August 1900
An Act to empower the Urban District Council of Farnworth to construct additional tramways and to work tramways and to make further provision for the good government of the said district and for other purposes.
Halifax Corporation Act 1900	63 & 64 Vict. c. ccxxxiv	6 August 1900
An Act to extend the boundaries of the County Borough of Halifax and to empower the Corporation to construct additional tramways street widenings and improvements to confer further powers with respect to their waterworks undertaking and in regard to streets buildings and drains and for the health local government and improvement of the borough and for other purposes.
Lancashire Electric Power Act 1900	63 & 64 Vict. c. ccxxxv	6 August 1900
An Act for incorporating and conferring powers on the Lancashire Electric Power Company.
Lancaster Corporation Act 1900	63 & 64 Vict. c. ccxxxvi	6 August 1900
An Act to empower the Corporation of Lancaster to construct tramways to widen streets and make a footbridge over the River Lune to deal with Lancaster Marsh to commute portions of the Vicar of Lancaster's tithe and dues to make further provisions for the good government of the Borough and for other purposes.
Liverpool Corporation Act 1900 (repealed)	63 & 64 Vict. c. ccxxxvii	6 August 1900
An Act for authorising the Corporation of the City of Liverpool to execute certain street improvements for making further provisions for the protection of the public health for amending various local Acts in force within the City for authorising the Corporation to raise money by the issue of bills and for other purposes. (Repealed by Liverpool Corporation Act 1921 (11 & 12 Geo. 5. c. lxxiv))
London County Tramways (Electrical Power) Act 1900	63 & 64 Vict. c. ccxxxviii	6 August 1900
An Act to enable the London County Council to work their tramways by electrical power and for other purposes.
Market Weighton Drainage Act 1900	63 & 64 Vict. c. ccxxxix	6 August 1900
An Act for incorporating and making better provisions for the meetings and proceedings of the Trustees of the Market Weighton Drainage and Canal in the East Riding of the County of York for better defining the lands subject to taxation by the said Trustees and making other provisions relative thereto for relieving the said Trustees from their obligations to maintain a part of the said canal for conferring further powers on the said Trustees and for other purposes.
Newcastle-upon-Tyne Electric Supply Company Act 1900	63 & 64 Vict. c. ccxl	6 August 1900
An Act to confer further powers upon the Newcastle-upon-Tyne Electric Supply Company Limited for the construction of works and the supply of electrical energy and for other purposes.
Oldham Corporation Act 1900	63 & 64 Vict. c. ccxli	6 August 1900
An Act to empower the Corporation of Oldham to extend and improve their existing Market Hall to confer further powers upon the Corporation with regard to sanitary and other matters and to make better provision for the health local government and improvement of the borough and for other purposes.
Rickmansworth and Uxbridge Valley Water Act 1900	63 & 64 Vict. c. ccxlii	6 August 1900
An Act for extending the limits of supply of and conferring further powers upon the Rickmansworth and Uxbridge Valley Water Company and for other purposes.
South Lancashire Tramways Act 1900 (repealed)	63 & 64 Vict. c. ccxliii	6 August 1900
An Act to incorporate the South Lancashire Tramways Company and to empower that Company to make tramways and street improvements and for other purposes. (Repealed by South Lancashire Transport Act 1958 (6 & 7 Eliz. 2. c. xxxiii))
Wandsworth and Putney Gas Act 1900 (repealed)	63 & 64 Vict. c. ccxliv	6 August 1900
An Act to convert the capital of the Wandsworth and Putney Gaslight and Coke Company to raise additional capital to construct works and for other purposes. (Repealed by Wandsworth, Wimbledon and Epsom District Gas Act 1912 (2 & 3 Geo. 5. c. xlvii))
West Bromwich Corporation Act 1900 (repealed)	63 & 64 Vict. c. ccxlv	6 August 1900
An Act to confer powers upon the Corporation of the County Borough of West Bromwich with respect to tramways and to their electric lighting and other undertakings to make further provision for the improvement and good government of the borough to amend and extend the provisions of the Local Acts relating to the borough and for other purposes. (Repealed by West Bromwich Corporation Act 1969 (c. lix))
West Ham Corporation Act 1900	63 & 64 Vict. c. ccxlvi	6 August 1900
An Act to confer further powers upon the Mayor Aldermen and Burgesses of the County Borough of West Ham and to make further provision for the good government of that borough and for other purposes.
Great Southern and Western, and Waterford, Limerick and Western Railways Amalgamation Act 1900	63 & 64 Vict. c. ccxlvii	6 August 1900
An Act for amalgamating the Waterford Limerick and Western Railway Company with the Great Southern and Western Railway Company and for other purposes.
Great Southern and Western, and Waterford and Central Ireland Railways Amalgamation Act 1900	63 & 64 Vict. c. ccxlviii	6 August 1900
An Act for amalgamating the undertaking of the Waterford and Central Ireland Railway Company with the Great Southern and Western Railway Company and for other purposes.
Caledonian Railway Act 1900	63 & 64 Vict. c. ccxlix	6 August 1900
An Act to confer further powers on the Caledonian Railway Company in relation to their undertaking to authorise the Lochearnhead St. Fillans and Comrie Railway Company to construct certain works in connexion with their railway to extend the periods for the purchase of lands for or for the completion of works by the before-mentioned Companies and the Callander and Oban Railway Company and for other purposes.
Margate Corporation Act 1900 (repealed)	63 & 64 Vict. c. ccl	6 August 1900
An Act to make provision in regard to the water undertaking of the Corporation of Margate to authorise the Corporation to construct promenades sea-walls street improvements and other works and to make further provision in regard to the health local government improvement and finance of the borough and for other purposes. (Repealed by County of Kent Act 1981 (c. xviii))
Midland Great Western Railway of Ireland Act 1900 (repealed)	63 & 64 Vict. c. ccli	6 August 1900
An Act for empowering the Midland Great Western Railway of Ireland Company to acquire additional lands to raise additional capital and for other purposes. (Repealed by Statute Law (Repeals) Act 2013 (c. 2))
London, Walthamstow and Epping Forest Railway (Abandonment) Act 1900 (repealed)	63 & 64 Vict. c. cclii	6 August 1900
An Act for the abandonment of the London Walthamstow and Epping Forest Railway and for other purposes. (Repealed by Statute Law (Repeals) Act 2013 (c. 2))
Muirkirk, Mauchline and Dalmellington Railways (Abandonment) Act 1900 (repealed)	63 & 64 Vict. c. ccliii	6 August 1900
An Act for the abandonment of the Muirkirk Mauchline and Dalmellington Railways. (Repealed by Statute Law (Repeals) Act 2013 (c. 2))
Hemel Hempstead Corporation Water Act 1900	63 & 64 Vict. c. ccliv	6 August 1900
An Act to make further provision for the purchase of the Hemel Hempstead Waterworks undertaking by the Corporation of Hemel Hempstead and for other purposes.
Morley Corporation Act 1900 (repealed)	63 & 64 Vict. c. cclv	6 August 1900
An Act to extend the borrowing powers of the Mayor Aldermen and Burgesses of the Borough of Morley and to make further provision in regard to their water and electrical undertakings and for the improvement and good government of the said borough and for other purposes. (Repealed by West Yorkshire Act 1980 (c. xiv))
South Eastern and London, Chatham and Dover Railways Act 1900	63 & 64 Vict. c. cclvi	6 August 1900
An Act to enable the South Eastern Railway Company to make new railways and other works to acquire additional lands to provide for the application of capital of the South Eastern and London Chatham and Dover Railway Companies and for other purposes.
Bexhill and Rotherfield Railway Act 1900 (repealed)	63 & 64 Vict. c. cclvii	6 August 1900
An Act to confer further powers on the BexhiU and Rotherfield Railway Company. (Repealed by Bexhill and Rotherfield Railway (Abandonment) Act 1902 (2 Edw. 7. c. cclx))
Sunderland Corporation Act 1900	63 & 64 Vict. c. cclviii	6 August 1900
An Act to empower the Mayor Aldermen and Burgesses of the Borough of Sunderland to contribute towards the construction by the North Eastern Railway Company of a bridge and road across the River Wear and to make provision for the construction of a new road in Southwick to join the same and for other purposes.
Alexandra Park and Palace (Public Purposes) Act 1900	63 & 64 Vict. c. cclix	6 August 1900
An Act to constitute a body of trustees for the purpose of acquiring the Alexandra Park Palace and other lands in the County of Middlesex and to empower them to hold and manage the same as a place of public resort and recreation and for other public purposes and to make all provisions necessary or proper in that behalf.
Gray and Enniskerry Railway Act 1900	63 & 64 Vict. c. cclx	6 August 1900
An Act to empower the Bray and Enniskerry Railway Company to work their authorised railway by electrical power and for other purposes.
Christchurch and Bournemouth Tramways Act 1900	63 & 64 Vict. c. cclxi	6 August 1900
An Act to empower the Poole and District Electric Traction Company Limited to construct tramways from Christchurch to Bournemouth and for other purposes.
Coventry Corporation Act 1900 (repealed)	63 & 64 Vict. c. cclxii	6 August 1900
An Act to empower the Corporation of Coventry to make certain street works and to confer further powers on them in regard to streets buildings and sewers and the health local government and improvement of the City and for other purposes. (Repealed by West Midlands County Council Act 1980 (c.xi))
Devonport Corporation Act 1900	63 & 64 Vict. c. cclxiii	6 August 1900
An Act to confer powers upon the Corporation of the Borough of Devonport with respect to the construction and working of tramways within the Borough for extending the powers of the said Corporation as to electric lighting for extending the boundaries of the said borough to make provision for the acquisition of the Devonport Market undertaking to confer further powers upon the said Corporation with respect to streets and other matters and in regard to the health local government and improvement of the said borough to make further provision for the collection and recovery of rates for the borrowing of money and for other purposes.
Dublin Corporation Act 1900 (repealed)	63 & 64 Vict. c. cclxiv	6 August 1900
An Act to extend the City of Dublin and for other purposes. (Repealed by Statute Law (Repeals) Act 2013 (c. 2))
Great Northern Railway (Ireland) Act 1900	63 & 64 Vict. c. cclxv	6 August 1900
An Act to confer further powers upon the Great Northern Railway Company (Ireland).
Hastings Corporation Act 1900	63 & 64 Vict. c. cclxvi	6 August 1900
An Act to confer further powers on the Corporation of the County Borough of Hastings with respect to the improvement and good government of the borough to amend and extend provisions of the Local Acts and for other purposes.
Huddersfield Corporation Tramways Act 1900 (repealed)	63 & 64 Vict. c. cclxvii	6 August 1900
An Act to enable the Mayor Aldermen and Burgesses of the Borough of Huddersfield to construct additional tramways in and adjacent to the borough and for other purposes. (Repealed by West Yorkshire Act 1980 (c.xiv))
London County Council (General Powers) Act 1900	63 & 64 Vict. c. cclxviii	6 August 1900
An Act to enable the London County Council to purchase lands for various purposes to provide for contributions by the Council and certain Vestries and District Boards of Works towards the acquisition of land for open spaces to extend the time limited for the purchase of certain lands by the Council to confer powers on the Vestry of Saint Mary Battersea as to the "Latchmere Allotments" and lands for an electric station and for other purposes.
London County Council (Improvements) Act 1900	63 & 64 Vict. c. cclxix	6 August 1900
An Act to empower the London County Council to make an extension of the Thames Embankment and a new street and improvements at Westminster to widen Mare Street Hackney and to make other street improvements and works in the Administrative County of London and for other purposes.
London County Tramways Act 1900	63 & 64 Vict. c. cclxx	6 August 1900
An Act to enable the London County Council to construct new tramways and to reconstruct and alter certain tramways in the County of London and to work certain tramways by electric traction and for other purposes.
London United Tramways Act 1900	63 & 64 Vict. c. cclxxi	6 August 1900
An Act for conferring further powers on the London United Tramways Limited for constructing tramways and widening and altering roads in the County of Middlesex and for other purposes.
Metropolis Gas (Prepayment Meter) Act 1900 (repealed)	63 & 64 Vict. c. cclxxii	6 August 1900
An Act for regulating the charges to be made by the Gas Light and Coke the South Metropolitan Gas and the Commercial Gas Companies in the Administrative County of London in respect of gas supplied by means of prepayment meters. (Repealed by Gas Act 1948 (11 & 12 Geo. 6. c. 67))
Metropolitan District Railway Act 1900	63 & 64 Vict. c. cclxxiii	6 August 1900
An Act for empowering the Metropolitan District Railway Company to erect a station for generating electrical energy and thereby work certain railways to acquire lands to extend the time for the completion of certain railways and compulsory purchase of lands to make certain provisions with respect to the Ealing and South Harrow and Brompton and Piccadilly Circus Railways to raise further capital and for other purposes.
Mid-Kent Water Act 1900	63 & 64 Vict. c. cclxxiv	6 August 1900
An Act for extending the limits of supply of the Mid-Kent Water Company and for conferring further powers on the Company for the construction of works the raising of capital and otherwise in relation to their undertaking.
Newry, Keady and Tynan Light Railway Act 1900	63 & 64 Vict. c. cclxxv	6 August 1900
An Act for making and maintaining railways in the counties of Down Armagh and Monaghan to be called the Newry Ready and Tynan Light Railway and for other purposes.
North Metropolitan Electric Power Supply Act 1900 (repealed)	63 & 64 Vict. c. cclxxvi	6 August 1900
An Act for incorporating and conferring powers upon the North Metropolitan Electric Power Supply Company and for other purposes. (Repealed by North Metropolitan Electric Power Supply (Consolidation) Act 1928 (18 & 19 Geo. 5. c. cxviii))
Plymouth, Stonehouse and Devonport Tramways Act 1900	63 & 64 Vict. c. cclxxvii	6 August 1900
An Act to confer further powers upon the Plymouth Stonehouse and Devonport Tramways Company to amend the Acts relating to that Company and for other purposes.
Rochdale Corporation Act 1900	63 & 64 Vict. c. cclxxviii	6 August 1900
An Act to enable the Mayor Aldermen and Burgesses of the Borough of Rochdale to reconstruct the existing tramways in the said borough when acquired by them and to construct additional tramways in and adjacent to the borough and to make further provisions for the good government of the borough and for other purposes.
Scarborough Corporation Act 1900	63 & 64 Vict. c. cclxxix	6 August 1900
An Act to empower the Corporation of Scarborough to make an Approach Road to the New Marine Drive to alter the line of the sea wall of the said Drive to make further and better provision for the improvement health and good government of the borough of Scarborough to alter the constitution of the Scarborough Harbour Commissioners and for other purposes.
Southport and Lytham Tramroad Act 1900	63 & 64 Vict. c. cclxxx	6 August 1900
An Act to empower the Southport District Tramroad Company to construct certain tramroads tramway and bridge between Southport and Lytham and for other purposes.
Southport Corporation Act 1900	63 & 64 Vict. c. cclxxxi	6 August 1900
An Act to enable the Mayor Aldermen and Burgesses of the Borough of Southport to carry out street improvements and other works and to make further provisions for the improvement and good government of the said borough and for other purposes.
South Wales Electrical Power Distribution Company Act 1900	63 & 64 Vict. c. cclxxxii	6 August 1900
An Act for incorporating and conferring powers on the South Wales Electrical Power Distribution Company.
Taunton Corporation Act 1900	63 & 64 Vict. c. cclxxxiii	6 August 1900
An Act to make provision in regard to the water undertaking of the Corporation of the borough of Taunton and to the health local government improvement and finance of the said borough to empower the said Corporation and the Trustees of the Markets of the borough to erect a townhall and to make further provision in regard to the said markets and for other purposes.
Tottenham Urban District Council Act 1900	63 & 64 Vict. c. cclxxxiv	6 August 1900
An Act to provide for vesting in the Urban District Council of Tottenham in the County of Middlesex the Lammas Lands in the district to confer various powers with respect to commons open spaces and recreation grounds streets buildings and other matters of local government and for other purposes.
Workington Railways and Docks Act 1900 (repealed)	63 & 64 Vict. c. cclxxxv	6 August 1900
An Act to incorporate a Company and authorise them to acquire the Workington Harbour and Lonsdale Dock undertaking in the County of Cumberland and to construct a dock railways and works at Workington and for other purposes. (Repealed by Workington Harbour and Dock (Transfer) Act 1957 (5 & 6 Eliz. 2. c. xxxii))
Bournemouth Corporation Act 1900 (repealed)	63 & 64 Vict. c. cclxxxvi	6 August 1900
An Act to authorise the Mayor Aldermen and Burgesses of the Borough of Bournemouth to acquire certain lands within the parishes of Bournemouth Holdenhurst and Pokesdown and to appropriate regulate and manage the same as open spaces to confirm an agreement relating thereto and for other purposes. (Repealed by Bournemouth Borough Council Act 1985 (c. v))
Walsall Corporation Act 1900 (repealed)	63 & 64 Vict. c. cclxxxvii	6 August 1900
An Act to empower the Corporation of Walsall to construct tramways to extend their powers in regard to their gas undertaking to make further provision in regard to financial matters and for the improvement of the borough and for other purposes. (Repealed by Walsall Corporation Act 1969 (c. lviii))
Liverpool Overhead Railway Act 1900 (repealed)	63 & 64 Vict. c. cclxxxviii	6 August 1900
An Act to authorise the Liverpool Overhead Railway Company to make certain new railways and for other purposes. (Repealed by Liverpool Overhead Railway Act 1956 (4 & 5 Eliz. 2. c. lxxxii))
Saint David's Railway Act 1900	63 & 64 Vict. c. cclxxxix	6 August 1900
An Act for the abandonment of the Saint David's Railway and for other purposes.
Kingscourt, Keady and Armagh Railway Act 1900	63 & 64 Vict. c. ccxc	8 August 1900
An Act to incorporate the Kingscourt Keady and Armagh Railway Company and to empower them to construct railways in the counties of Cavan Monaghan and Armagh and for other purposes.
Manchester Corporation Tramways Act 1900	63 & 64 Vict. c. ccxci	8 August 1900
An Act to authorise the Corporation of Manchester to construct additional tramways in and near the city and to confer further powers upon the Corporation and neighbouring authorities in respect of tramways within and beyond the city and for other purposes.

=== Private and personal acts ===
Short title	Citation	Royal assent
Long title
Fraser Settled Chattels Act 1900	63 & 64 Vict. c. 1 Pr.	6 August 1900
An Act to authorise the Sale of the Chattels bequeathed and settled by the Will and Codicils of the late Sir William Augustus Fraser, Baronet, (Note: Sir William Fraser, 4th Baronet.) deceased, and to declare the Trusts of the proceeds of such Sale, and for other purposes.

=== Sources ===
- Volume 38 - 63 and 63 & 64 Victoria - 1900 – via Internet Archive.

== 64 Vict. Sess. 2 ==
The first session of the 27th Parliament of the United Kingdom, which met from 3 December 1900 until 15 December 1900.

There were no local or private acts passed in this session.

=== Public general acts ===
Short title	Citation	Royal assent
Long title
Supplemental War Loan (No. 2) Act 1900 (repealed)	64 Vict. Sess. 2. c. 1	15 December 1900
An Act to provide for raising a further Supplemental Loan for the service of the year ending the thirty-first day of March nineteen hundred and one. (Repealed by Statute Law Revision Act 1950 (14 Geo. 6. c. 6))
Appropriation Act 1900, Session 2 (Note: This was the last public act of the reign of Queen Victoria.) (repealed)	64 Vict. Sess. 2. c. 2	15 December 1900
An Act to apply a sum out of the Consolidated Fund to the service of the year ending on the thirty-first day of March one thousand nine hundred and one, and to appropriate the Supplies granted in this Session of Parliament. (Repealed by Statute Law Revision Act 1908 (8 Edw. 7. c. 49))

=== Sources ===
- Volume 38 - 63 and 63 & 64 Victoria - 1900 – via Internet Archive.

== See also ==
- List of acts of the Parliament of the United Kingdom
