= Volunteer Act 1900 =

Act of the Parliament of the United Kingdom

Volunteer Act 1900 (Note: Section 4.)
- Act of Parliament
- Parliament of the United Kingdom
- Long title: An Act to amend the Volunteer Act, 1863.
- Citation: 63 & 64 Vict. c. 39
- Territorial extent: United Kingdom

Dates
- Royal assent: 6 August 1900
- Commencement: 6 August 1900 (Note: The Acts of Parliament (Commencement) Act 1793.)
- Repealed: 10 March 1966
Other legislation
Amends	Volunteer Act 1863; Volunteer Act 1895
Repealed by	Statute Law Revision Act 1966

Status: Repealed

Text of statute as originally enacted

The Volunteer Act 1900 (63 & 64 Vict. c. 39) was an act of the Parliament of the United Kingdom, given royal assent on 6 August 1900 and repealed in 1966.

The act amended the Volunteer Act 1863 (26 & 27 Vict. c. 65) by replacing the phrase "actual or apprehended invasion of any part of the United Kingdom" in section 17 with "imminent national danger or great emergency", thus permitting the volunteer force to be called out for service in times of emergency even when the country was not at risk of invasion. It also provided that any member of a volunteer corps could volunteer to be liable to be called up for service in a coastal defence role in any agreed areas, for service at any time.

The act repealed section 2 of the Volunteer Act 1895 (58 & 59 Vict. c. 23).

== Subsequent developments ==
The whole act was repealed by section 1 of, and the schedule to, the Statute Law Revision Act 1966, which came into force on 10 March 1966.
