= Ashton-under-Lyne tramway network =

Tram network in Greater Manchester, England

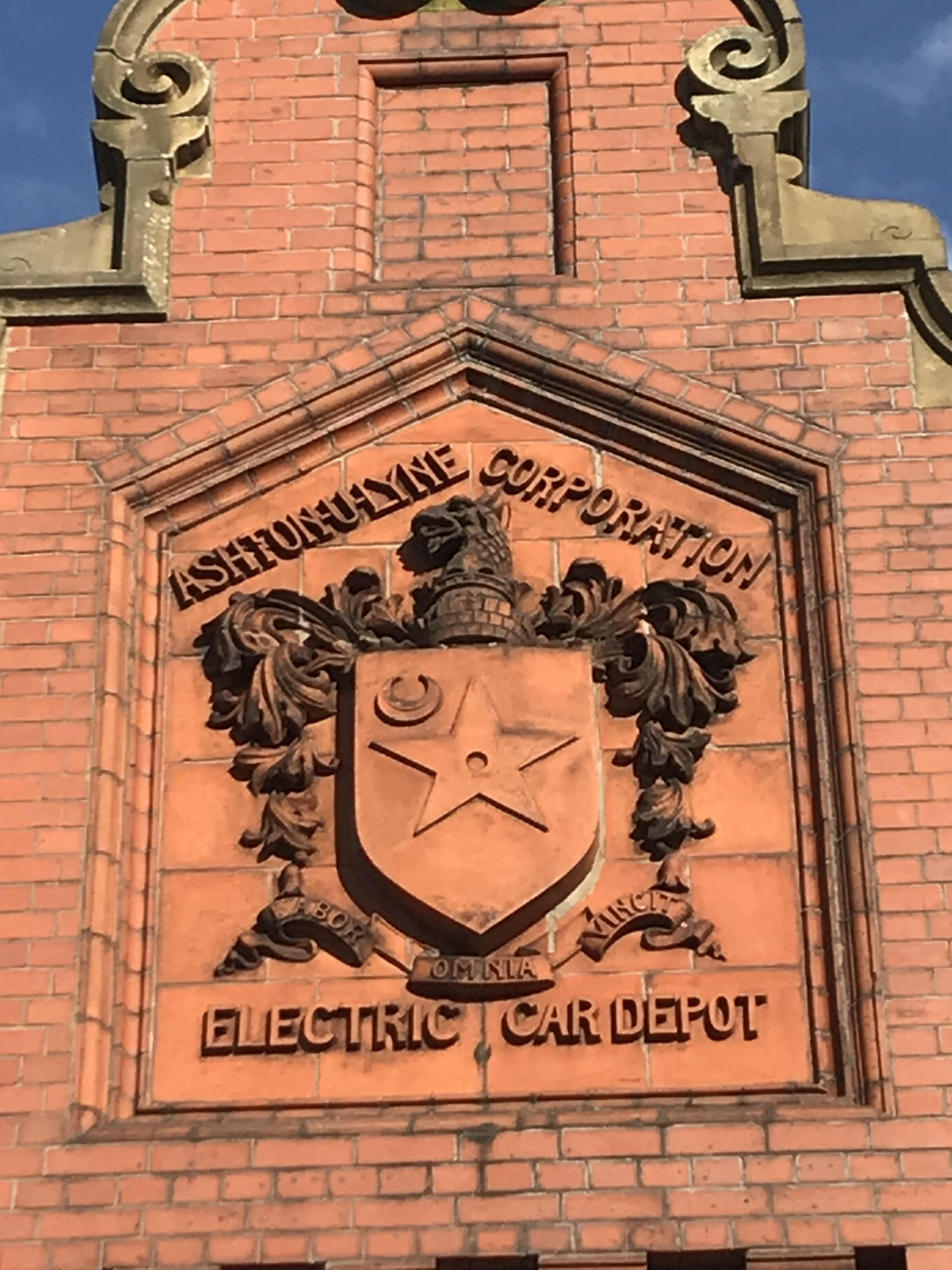
Former Mossley Road electric tram depot in Ashton-Under-Lyne

Tramways of Tameside

The history of trams in Ashton-under-Lyne date back to 1878, through the Manchester Carriage and Tramways Company. These trams were horse-drawn trams and began operation in 1881, between Stalybridge and Ashton-under-Lyne. The route began at Stalybridge's town hall, stopping at Ashton-Under-Lyne and terminating at the Snipe Inn at Ashton-Under-Lyne/Audenshaw boundary line. The Stalybridge, Hyde, Mossley and Dukinfield Tramways and Electricity Board provided tram operations in the wider Tameside region.

== Electric trams in Tameside ==
In 1896, plans were made to introduce electric trams by the British Electric Traction Company. This was through the legislative instrument of the Oldham, Ashton-under-Lyne, Hyde and District Electric Tramways Order 1896, confirmed by the Tramways Orders Confirmation (No. 2) Act 1896 (59 & 60 Vict. c. clxvi).

In the following year of 1897, the Oldham, Ashton and Hyde and District Tramway Company was established to facilitate electric trams across these regions. In 1899, the first electric tram service was operational from the Oldham, Ashton and Hyde and District Tramway Company. One of the routes, operated between Ashton-Under-Lyne—Hyde—Denton.

Archive footage from the British Film Institute in 1901, shows one of the electric trams, alighting at Ashton-Under-Lyne, through a route of Ashton-Under-Lyne—Denton—Hyde.

== Split from the Stalybridge, Hyde, Mossley and Dukinfield Board ==
In 1899, representatives across the towns of Ashton-Under-Lyne, Stalybridge, Hyde, Mossley and Dukinfield, held discussions to create an integrated tram system across the five regions. These discussions were unsuccessful. Subsequently, four of the regions, Stalybridge, Hyde, Mossley and Dukinfield, formed the Stalybridge, Hyde, Mossley and Dukinfield Tramways and Electricity Board. Ashton-Under-Lyne decided to form separately its own tram system, through the Ashton-under-Lyne Corporation. This was facilitated by local legislative powers through the Ashton-under-Lyne Corporation Tramways Order 1900 and the Hurst Urban District Council Tramways Order 1900.

== Establishment of the Ashton-under-Lyne Corporation ==
The first route by the Ashton-under-Lyne Corporation began in 1902 between Ashton-under-Lyne and Hurst. This began in the centre of Ashton-under-Lyne at Market Hall, travelling North through Henrietta Street, Canterbury Street, Union Road, Kings Road, Alderley Street to reach Hurst Cross, and travelling South through Queen Road, where the tram would take one of the options to return to Market Hall. The first would be through Whiteacre Road returning to the Market Hall. The second, much longer option, travels the full length Queens Road, and travels through Mossley Road to return to Market Hall, Ashton-Under-Lyne. One of the routes is outlined at "Driving directions for electric old tram route of 1902 in Ashton-Under-Lyne" (Map). Google Maps.

== Tram maintenance depot ==
A maintenance depot for the electric trams was created in 1902, on Mossley Road in Ashton-under-Lyne for the repair and maintenance on the electric trams. This building was later repurposed for electric trolleybuses of the Ashton-under-Lyne trolleybus system and then repurposed into business offices for present day use. The original signage for the electric tram depot is still visible on the top front facing edge of one of the middle business offices.

== An integrated tram system for Greater Manchester ==
The failure of the Tameside regions to set-up a combined electric tram system in 1899, was later achieved through the present-day Metrolink which interconnects many of the 10 boroughs of Greater Manchester. The old tram network of the 1900s in Ashton-under-Lyne is no longer operational with the old tramlines now replaced with tarmacked roads.
