= Statute Law Revision Act 1908 =

Act of the Parliament of the United Kingdom

Statute Law Revision Act 1908 (Note: Section 3.)
- Act of Parliament
- Parliament of the United Kingdom
- Long title: An Act for further promoting the Revision of the Statute Law by repealing Enactments which have ceased to be in force or have become unnecessary.
- Citation: 8 Edw. 7. c. 49
- Introduced by: Lord Chancellor (Lords)
- Territorial extent: United Kingdom

Dates
- Royal assent: 21 December 1908
- Commencement: 21 December 1908 (Note: The Acts of Parliament (Commencement) Act 1793)
- Repealed: 19 November 1998
Other legislation
Repeals/revokes	Consolidated Fund (No. 1) Act 1896; Local Government (Elections) (No. 2) Act 1896; Consolidated Fund (No. 2) Act 1896; Dispensary Committees (Ireland) Act 1896
Amended by	Statute Law Revision Act 1927; Courts Act 1971; Administration of Justice Act 1977; Statute Law (Repeals) Act 1998
Repealed by	Statute Law (Repeals) Act 1998
Relates to	Repeal of Obsolete Statutes Act 1856; See Statute Law Revision Act

Status: Repealed

Text of statute as originally enacted

The Statute Law Revision Act 1908 (8 Edw. 7. c. 49) was an act of the Parliament of the United Kingdom. It repealed the whole or part of acts, from the Consolidated Fund (No. 1) Act 1887 (50 & 51 Vict. c. 1) to the Appropriation Act 1900 (63 & 64 Vict. c. 57).

== Subsequent developments ==
The schedule to the act was repealed by section 1 of, and the part I of the schedule to, the Statute Law Revision Act 1927 (17 & 18 Geo. 5. c. 42), which came into force on 22 December 1927.

The words "to the court of the county palatine of Lancaster or" in section 2 of the act were repealed by section 56(4) of, and part II of schedule 11 to, the Courts Act 1971, which came into force on 1 January 1972.

Section 2 of the act was repealed by section 32(4) of, and part V of schedule 5 to, the Administration of Justice Act 1977, which came into force on 29 July 1977.

The enactments which were repealed (whether for the whole or any part of the United Kingdom) by the act were repealed so far as they extended to the Isle of Man by section 1(1) of, and schedule 1 to, the Statute Law Revision (Isle of Man) Act 1991, which came into force on 25 July 1991.

The whole act was repealed by section 1(1) of, and group 1 of part IX of schedule 1 to, the Statute Law (Repeals) Act 1998, which came into force on 19 November 1998.

The act was retained for the Republic of Ireland by section 2(2)(a) of, and part 4 of schedule 1 to, the Statute Law Revision Act 2007, which came into force on 8 May 2007.

== See also ==
- Statute Law Revision Act
