= 1911 United Kingdom census boycotters =

People involved in the 1911 United Kingdom census boycott

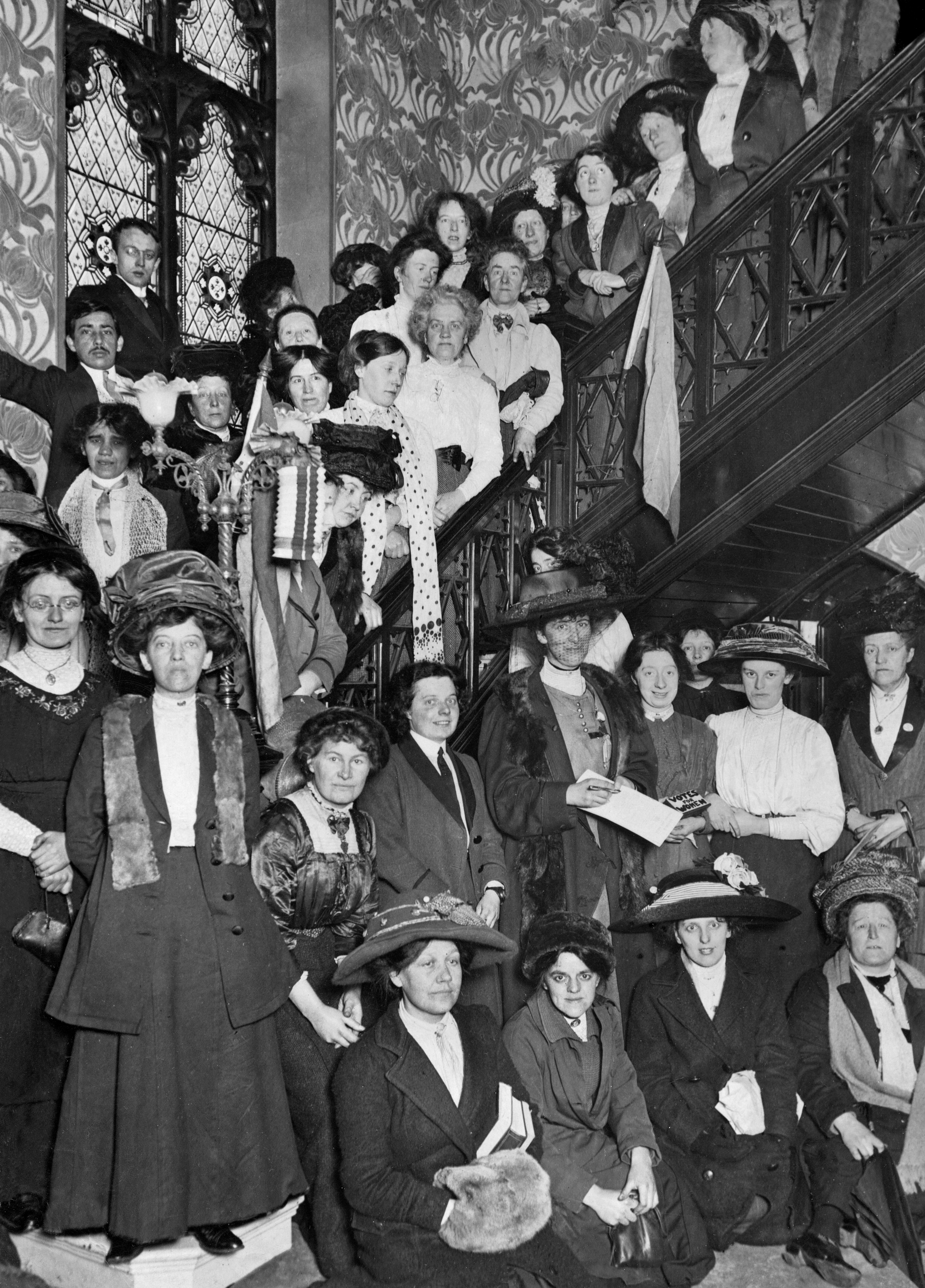
Suffragettes boycotting 1911 census in Manchester

This is a list of people who participated in or organised the boycott of the 1911 United Kingdom census as part of the campaign for women's suffrage in the United Kingdom. On census night, 2 April 1911, some campaigners evaded enumeration or refused to supply information; others recorded protests on their census forms. Supporters also organised gatherings, provided accommodation and publicised the boycott. The number of participants remains uncertain; historians have questioned contemporary estimates of as many as 100,000.

== Participants and organisers ==
The people identified in accounts of the boycott include:

- Laura Ainsworth, 38 other women and one man sought to hide in Jezreel's Tower in Gillingham, Kent, but they were betrayed and still counted by census officials.
- Rhoda Anstey: participated on behalf of the Anstey College of Physical Education, which she had founded in 1897
- Helen Archdale: hosted a mass census boycott party with Adela Pankhurst
- Hertha Ayrton: hosted a boycott party for approximately 40 people at her home in 41 Norfolk Square. Wrote on census form: "How can I answer all these questions if I have not the intelligence to choose between two candidates or parliament? I will not supply these particulars until I have my rights as a citizen. Votes for Women."
- Minnie Baldock: did not appear on the census, although her husband and sons were enumerated
- Inez Bensusan: member of the Actresses' Franchise League who performed during a mass evasion party
- Rosa May Billinghurst
- Mary Blathwayt
- Dorothy Bowker: wrote: "Dumb Politically, Blind to the Census, Deaf to the Enumerator. Being classed with criminals lunatics & paupers I prefer to give no further particulars"
- Nina Boyle: wrote "No Votes. No Census. Votes for Women" on her census form
- Georgina Brackenbury: hosted an evasion party for 25 women and one man.
- Marie Brackenbury: hosted an evasion party for 25 women and one man. Wrote on the census form: "Miss Marie Brackenbury in charge takes this opportunity of registering her protest against the votelessness of the women of Great Britain by refusing to fill in this form."
- Constance Bryer
- Florence Canning
- Joan Cather and her husband
- Joseph Clayton
- Annie Coultate
- Margaret Cousins
- Ellen Crocker
- Hilda Dallas
- Irene Dallas
- Emily Davison: hid in the House of Commons and was thus registered as an "occupant" of the Palace of Westminster and enumerated in Parliament
- Charlotte Despard: co-signed the Women's Freedom League manifesto calling for a census boycott.
- Lillian Dove-Willcox: organised the boycott in Trowbridge
- Flora Drummond
- Bessie Drysdale: wrote on her form: "as the Government refuses me a vote and as I am not therefore recognised as a citizen, I refuse to perform the duties of one in giving the information required by the Government"
- Charles Vickery Drysdale
- Florence Earengey
- Dorothy Evans: organised parties for census boycotters in Birmingham
- Ada Flatman
- Florence Gertrude de Fonblanque
- Kate Gillie: dedicated her boycott of the census "in loving memory of Mrs [Mary Jane] Clarke and Miss Henria [Leech] Williams who lost their lives for the cause"
- Eva Gore-Booth
- Kate Harvey
- Anna Haslam
- Alice Hawkins
- Vera Holme
- Clemence Housman: evaded the census in Dorset.
- Laurence Housman: publicised the boycott and accommodated census evaders in his home. (Note: He advertised the movement through a series of articles published in The Vote, in which he argued for the reasoning and tactical benefits of the boycott. He also wrote fiction supporting the movement, setting this series in a potential future where the boycott went well.)
- Edith How-Martyn: co-signed the Women's Freedom League manifesto calling for a census boycott.
- Elsie Howey: refused to be enumerated and wrote "Votes for Women" on her form
- Mary Howey: listed her occupation as "artist and suffragette" and her infirmity as "not enfranchised"
- Maud Joachim
- Violet Key Jones: organised the suffragette boycott in York
- Helena Jones
- Annie Kenney: organised the census boycott in Bristol
- Lilian Lenton
- Marion Mackenzie
- Susan Manning: recorded her religion as "militant suffragette" and her disability as "legally unfit to vote"
- Mildred Mansel: hired 12 Lansdowne Crescent in Bath to be used by the 35 local census evaders
- Katherine "Kitty" Marshall
- Muriel Matters
- Eleonora Maund: attempted to remove her name from the household return; her husband reinstated it.
- Winifred Mayo
- Decima Moore
- Ethel Moorhead
- Clara Neal: stayed overnight in a sea cave on the Gower Peninsula
- Henry Nevinson
- Margaret Nevinson and an undetermined number of other women documented their reasons for refusal
- Frances Olive Outerbridge
- Adela Pankhurst
- Christabel Pankhurst
- Emmeline Pankhurst: was enumerated at a London hotel despite the attempted boycott.
- Emmeline Pethick-Lawrence: wrote a protest on her census form.
- Frederick Pethick-Lawrence, 1st Baron Pethick-Lawrence
- Dorothy Pethick
- Mary Phillips (suffragette): wrote on her form "NO VOTE NO CENSUS. Posterity will know how to judge the Government if it persists in bringing about the falsification of national statistics instead of acting on its own principles and making itself truly representational of the people"
- Emily Phipps: stayed overnight in a sea cave on the Gower Peninsula
- Catherine Pine
- Ellen Pitfield
- Aileen Preston
- Katherine Raleigh
- Edith Rigby
- Elizabeth Robins
- Dorothea Rock: wrote on her return "I, Dorothea Rock, in the absence of the male occupier, refuse to fill up this Census paper as, in the eyes of the Law, women do not count, neither shall they be counted"
- Bertha Ryland
- Lavena Saltonstall
- Alice Schofield
- Evelyn Sharp (suffragist) and other census resisters
- Hanna Sheehy-Skeffington
- Isabel Giberne Sieveking: the enumerator wrote on her return: "Husband had left the town when I called and the wife, who is a suffragette, refused to sign as correct"
- Sophia Duleep Singh: refused to complete her return, writing a protest against women's exclusion from the vote.
- Ethel Smyth
- Jessie Stephenson: organised the census boycott in Manchester
- Frances Swiney
- Violet Tillard: wrote on the household census return: “No Vote No Census. Should women become persons in the eye of the law this session - full information will be forwarded”
- Constance Tite: refused to supply census particulars, attaching a suffrage protest notice to her return.
- Aethel Tollemache
- Alice Vickery
- Jessey Wade
- Ethel Williams (physician)
- Lilian Wolfe
- Celia Wray and Alice Embleton: defaced their census paper by writing the slogan "Getting votes for those who pay the piper. Getting votes for women" across it.
- Rose Lamartine Yates
- Edith Zangwill: wrote on the household census form: "The rest of the household is not entered as we feel that until women have the political rights of citizens, they should not perform the duties of citizens. Mr Zangwill is not at home"
