= Margaret Nevinson =

English suffragist (1858–1932)

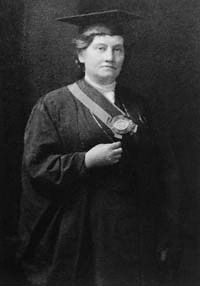
- Margaret Nevinson in 1910.
- Born: Margaret Wynne Jones; 11 January 1858; Leicester, England
- Died: 8 June 1932 (aged 74); London, England
- Occupations: Educator, Suffragist
- Spouse: Henry Nevinson (m. 1884)
- Children: 2 (including Christopher)

Margaret Wynne Nevinson (née Jones; 11 January 1858 – 8 June 1932) was a British suffrage campaigner and author. She was one of the radical activists who in 1907–8 split from established suffragist groups to form the Women's Freedom League. She was a prominent early female Justice of the Peace in London, as well as serving as a Poor Law Guardian.

== Early life and background ==
She was the daughter of the Rev. Timothy Jones and his wife Mary Louisa Bowmar of Canning Place, Leicester, second daughter of Thomas Bowmar, married in 1854; her father, a graduate of Magdalen College, Oxford, died in 1875. At the time of his death he was vicar of Buckden, Huntingdonshire, having left St Margaret's Church, Leicester some weeks earlier. He was Welsh, from Silian, Cardiganshire, and a Welsh speaker. The marriage was his second, his first wife having died and being commemorated in a window of the church. Also commemorated was his son Llewellyn. His wife was half-Welsh.

Jones was appointed to the church in 1852. The parish comprised more than half of Leicester's population in 1863. It had been prominent, in 1840 when Henry Phillpotts in the House of Lords mentioned a letter from Andrew Irvine, the vicar, saying that his parish had a population of 30,000 and was being targeted by Socialists. In 1850, William Henry Anderdon, then the vicar, who had shown "Tractarian piety and poverty", converted to Catholicism. John Hungerford Pollen in 1851 wrote an account of Anderdon's parish work, including founding a College at the vicarage that was shut down by his successor. He also commented that Anderdon knew when he took on the parish that "more than ten people had refused it". "The income was small"; and the patron was "much alarmed" by Anderdon's approach. The patron was the Rev. Sir John Hobart Culme-Seymour, 2nd Baronet, and the annual income in 1863 was given as £380.

Anderdon's successor, appointed in 1851, was the Rev. Michael Seymour Edgell, a graduate of Oriel College, Oxford, who moved on to a curacy in Camberwell in 1853. Jones had himself come under Tractarian influences while at Oxford, and followed also ritualist and Christian Socialist trends.

== Education and marriage ==
In a family with at least four boys, Margaret learned Latin and ancient Greek as they did, taught by their father. Their upbringing was High Church. Her mother fearing that knowledge of Greek might make Margaret unmarriageable, it was replaced by French and drawing.

Timothy Lloyd (1855/6–1920), an older brother, was educated at Derby School, graduated at Lincoln College, Oxford in 1879, and followed his father into the Church of England. Two more of the sons, Trevor Bowmar (third), and Mervyn Alban (fourth) went to Malvern College; Mervyn left in 1875 and was educated at Eton College, becoming a sailor and surveyor in Queensland. Margaret attended St Anne's Rewley, a convent school in Oxford she disliked, and a finishing school in a château near Paris up to her father's death. Later she took an external degree at the University of St Andrews.

Margaret had a teaching career, as a governess in a family, a pupil teacher in Cologne, and as a classics mistress at South Hampstead High School. In 1882–3 she took a course of lectures in English given by Henry Morley at University College London. She married in 1884 Henry Nevinson; although the marriage lasted, it appears that both parties regretted it, and in their autobiographies they gave it minimal attention.

== East End of London ==
Returning to England after a year spent in Germany, Henry and Margaret Nevinson became involved in the settlement movement work at Toynbee Hall, in London's East End, while living for two years at a flat in model dwellings, the Brunswick Buildings, Goulston, Whitechapel. She taught French at the Hall, and supported a girls' club at St Jude, Whitechapel. Of this involvement in settlement work, she later wrote "I never recall a dull moment" of the two years.

Nevinson also worked as a rent-collector for landlords that were charitable organisations. The prevalent model for this role came from the Katharine Buildings in Aldgate, where the collector of rents also acted as a consultant in managing household budgets. Nevinson was one of the group, with Beatrice Potter, Ella Pycroft and Maurice Paul, who tried at this period to make the approach into a practical plan of management. She was a collector both at the Katharine Buildings, for Olivia Hill, and at the Lolesworth Buildings in Spitalfields.

Ross tentatively attributes to Margaret Nevinson an essay "A Lady Resident" appearing in 1889 in East London by Charles Booth. Henry Nevinson published in 1895 Neighbours of Ours: Slum Stories of London, a collection of 1880s stories based on the couple's East End times. Margaret was not credited, and was aggrieved, having supplied background material.

== Hampstead ==
In 1887 the Nevinsons and their young daughter moved to Keats Grove, Hampstead, into an old house, with Henry Asquith briefly their neighbour at No. 12. Around 1896 they went to a new-built house on Parliament Hill, then in 1901 bought a house at 4 Downside Crescent, Haverstock Hill, where they settled. Close by on Haverstock Hill lived another radical and suffragist couple, their associates Jane Brailsford and her husband Noel.

== Role in the suffrage movement ==
Nevinson was a constant public speaker for the suffrage cause during the later Edwardian period. From 1907 she spoke often up to four or five times a week, and until votes for women were first granted only on that topic. She played on her Welsh heritage, in a speech at London's Steinway Hall saying "the Welsh ought to make good suffragists".

=== Militancy ===
Nevinson had multiple and overlapping memberships in women's activist groups. She joined the Hampstead branch of the National Union of Women's Suffrage Societies (NUWSS), which believed in a constitutional route to votes for women. She then for a short period was with the Pankhurst family militants of the Women's Social and Political Union (WSPU). In 1907 she was with Charlotte Despard a founder member of the Women's Freedom League (WFL), as some 70 women broke away from the WSPU. They rejected some of the Pankhurst tactics, such as arson, and adopted tax resistance. Nevinson later refused to pay taxes, which she should have done on behalf of her husband, then working abroad.

In summer 1908 Muriel Matters set out to take a WFL campaigning van into counties south of London. Nevinson joined it in Kent in mid-September. They braved noisy hostility and some man-handling of the van on visits to Canterbury and Herne Bay.

At a contentious meeting of the London Society for Women's Suffrage (LSWS) in November 1908, Nevinson was in a minority group of four who pressed for resolutions requiring the NUWSS to adopt an electoral stance opposed to the Asquith administration, and also requiring that the NUWSS executive committee should shun party political positions. Millicent Fawcett took a forceful line against the proposals: with her three colleagues Flora Murray, Mrs. Hylton Dale and Louisa Garrett Anderson, Nevinson was associated with the WSPU, and suspicion that the WSPU was looking to control the NUWSS led to defeat. Fawcett made it clear that the dissident group should leave the LSWS.

=== 1911 census resistance ===
In the aftermath of the December 1910 United Kingdom general election, which promised no rapid constitutional change, support coalesced in the WFL for a mass protest on the suffrage issue aimed at the 1911 census. Nevinson early committed the participation of the Women Writers' Suffrage League. It was agreed that if the King's Speech in February yielded nothing, the protest would proceed. It was argued that John Burns and the Local Government Board would use the information solicited on women and work to help formulate legislation to restrict female paid labour.

On the census night 2 April 1911, Henry Nevinson was absent from home. Margaret Nevinson, on the other hand, was at home in Downside Crescent, harbouring an undetermined number of women who did not wish to be included in the census. An official copy of the census schedule survives, with a note on the refusals and their reason. Henry went skating, dining with Evelyn Sharp and other census resisters.

The impact of the census boycott is unclear. Margaret Nevinson wrote in the Suffrage Annual that some thousands of women did not appear in the census for that reason. The estimate by Agnes Metcalfe that the figure was at least 100,000 is doubted.

== Other interests ==
A school manager, Nevinson sat for 25 years on local education committees, for the London County Council and School Board.

In 1916 Nevinson replied to an appeal from the Jesuit army chaplain Bernard Vaughan in an editorial for The Vote. She queried the war role assigned to mothers, and drew attention to jingoism in churches, and oppressive treatment of conscientious objectors. Inkpin writes that "she was revealing the feelings of many Christian pacifist women". She became a vice-president of the Women Peace Crusade in 1928.

Nevinson resigned as a Poor Law guardian in Hampstead in 1922, a post she had held from 1904, over issues with the running of the Hampstead Poor Law Hospital, and the withholding of outdoor relief from the unemployed.

The Sex Disqualification (Removal) Act 1919 meant that women could serve as magistrates, and the Women's Freedom League put Nevinson's name forward. She was appointed in 1920. She was one of the first female magistrates in England, and the first woman to sit on the criminal bench in the county of London, adjudicating at the criminal petty sessions. She went on to be one of three women first appointed to the body choosing London magistrates, with Beatrix Lyall and Marion Phillips. She visited the USA to study the probation system in 1921.

== Works ==
In the Westminster Gazette, Nevinson wrote stories that drew on her service as a Poor Law guardian, with a strong emphasis on the social vulnerability of women. A volume of those, with two from the Daily News and one from the Herald, was published in 1918 as Workhouse Characters, and other sketches of the life of the poor. The Preface stated that they dated back over 13 years.

Nevinson wrote many articles for the WFL journal, The Vote, and also wrote suffrage pamphlets. Those published through the Women's Freedom League included A History of the Suffrage Movement: 1908–1912, and Ancient Suffragettes (1911). There was also The Spoilt Child and the Law.

After a story collection Fragments of Life (1922) including autobiographical material, Nevinson published in 1926 her autobiography Life's Fitful Fever.

=== In the Workhouse (1911) ===
Nevinson was secretary of the Actresses' Franchise League (AFL), succeeding Bessie Hatton. Founded in 1908, the AFL played a major part in British suffrage theatre because of the membership of professional actresses. Its literary side was run by Inez Bensusan. In the Workhouse was a one-act naturalistic play, adapted from one of Nevinson's newspaper stories. It was typical of the AFL strand of drama, in showing working class women, and predicaments that were tacit arguments for women's political representation. It made a point about child custody rights, which as the law stood for unmarried mothers gave them stronger claims to their children than were available to married women.

Performed on 8 May 1911 in the Kingsway Theatre as a matinée, In the Workhouse was produced by Edith Craig's Pioneer Players. It formed part of a triple bill with Chris St. John's The First Actress and Cicely Hamilton's Jack and Jill and A Friend. The Pioneer Players, a subscription theatre, had been set up that year, and typically gave single performances at smaller London theatres. The play was published by the International Suffrage Shop in Adam Street, London, set up in 1910 by Sime Seruya.

The female protagonists of In the Workhouse are victims of "circumstances beyond their control". The play is an exposé of the Coverture Act, which decreed that a married woman had no separate legal existence from her husband. If her husband entered – or left – the workhouse, she and her children were obliged to go with him. The setting is a workhouse ward, where a group of mothers, married and unmarried, look after their children. Penelope, a mother of five, is unmarried but not constrained. The respectable dressmaker Mrs. Cleaver is subject to the "marital authority" of a drunken husband. With work to go to and a home available for her children, she returns from an appeal to the Board of Guardians with no right to leave. The play, with its refusal to condemn vice and the unmarried mother, was criticised as an offensive "lewd drama". It contributed to a change in the law.

As a play dealing with the social and economic status of women, In the Workhouse has been classed with The Thumbscrew by Edith Lyttelton. The curtain speech made by its heroine Lily to her illegitimate child has been taken as an allusion to Edith Craig's illegitimacy, and the life-decisions taken by her mother Ellen Terry. The Pall Mall Gazette compared In the Workhouse to works of Eugène Brieux

which plead for reform by painting a terrible, and perhaps overcharged, picture of things as they are... Such is the power of the dramatic pamphlet, sincerely written and sincerely acted. There is nothing to approach it in directness and force. It sweeps all mere prettiness into oblivion.

The play was revived in 1979 by Mrs Worthington's Daughters, a feminist theatre company, directed by Julie Holledge in a double-bill with Susannah Cibber's The Oracle (1752).

== Family ==
Henry Nevinson's husband was also active in the suffrage movement, becoming a founder of the Men's Political Union for Women's Enfranchisement for which he wrote at least one dramatic sketch. After Margaret's death he remarried, to her close friend and prominent suffragist, Evelyn Sharp.

The couple had two children, Mary Philippa (born in Germany) who in 1911 married the architect Sidney Caulfield, and Richard Nevinson the artist, born 1889.

== See also ==
- List of suffragists and suffragettes
