= Inez Bensusan =

Australian born actress, playwright and suffragette in the UK

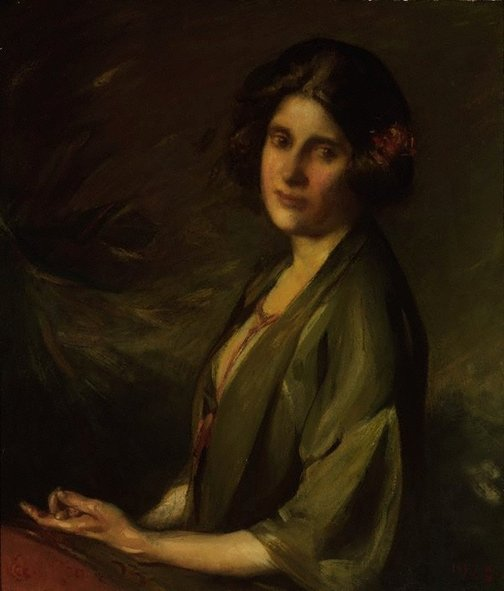
- Portrait, 1924 by Cecil William Rea
- Born: 11 September 1871; Sydney, Australia
- Died: 10 October 1967 (aged 96)
- Education: University of Sydney
- Occupations: actress, playwright and suffragette
- Organization(s): Women's Social and Political Union, Actresses' Franchise League, Jewish League for Woman Suffrage, Women Writers' Suffrage League, Coronet Theatre, Women’s Institute

Inez Bensusan (11 September 1871 – 10 October 1967) was an Australian born Jewish actress, playwright and suffragette in the UK. She was a leader of the Actresses' Franchise League and the Jewish League for Woman Suffrage.

== Life ==
Bensusan was born to a wealthy Jewish family in Sydney, Australia on 11 September 1871. Her father, Samuel Levy Bensusan was an agent for miners and her mother was Julia Rosa Bensusan (née Vallentine). She was the eldest of the couples ten children.

Bensusan studied at the University of Sydney, and established a stage career in her native Australia. Bensusan and her family moved to England in 1894. Soon after arriving in Britain, Bensusan joined an acting troupe. Bensusan performed for the first time in London in 1897. Over the following years, she performed in plays around the world, in England, USA and Australia. Between 1906 until 1938, she would go on to appear in more than fifty plays in the West End in London.

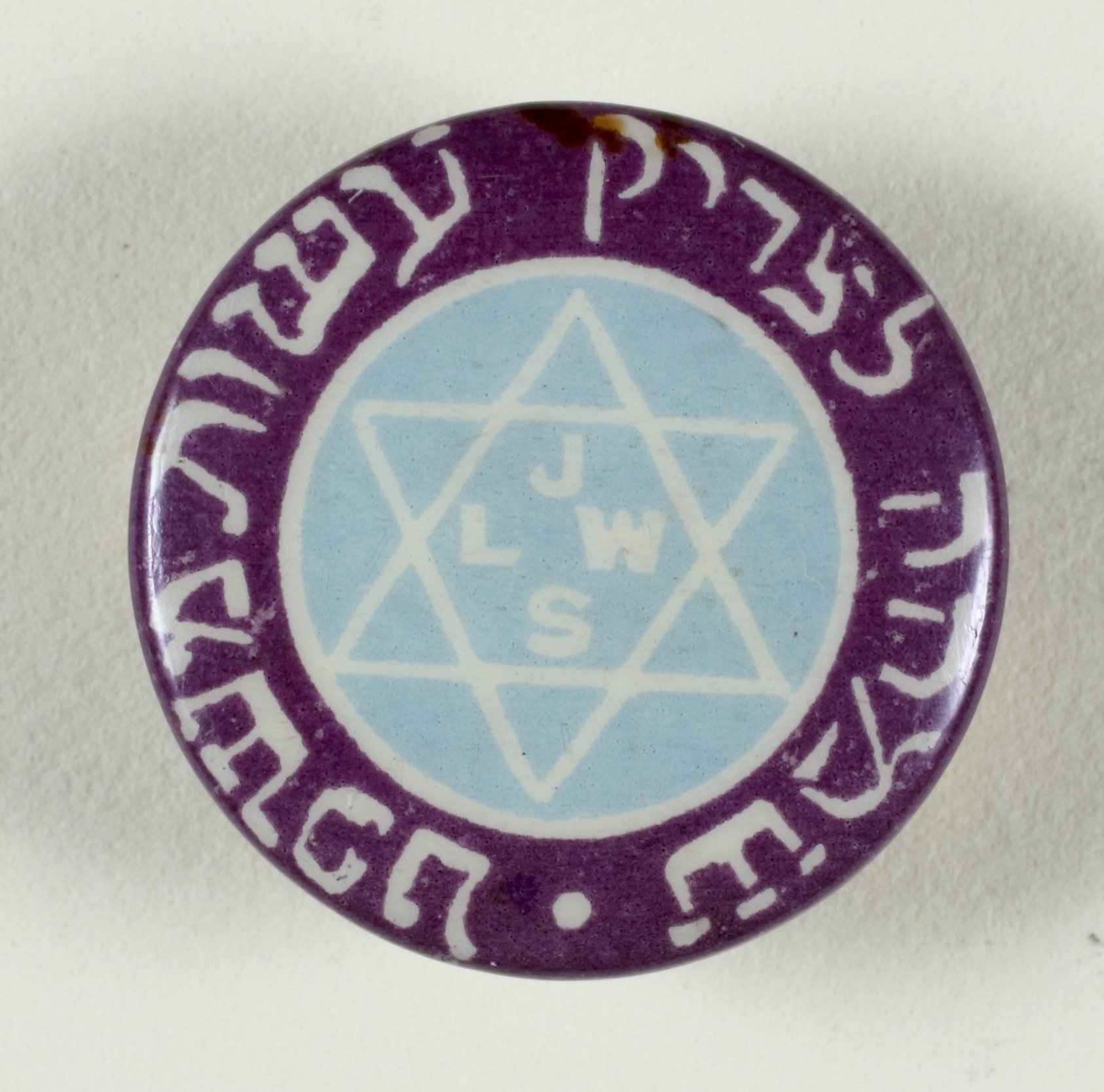
Jewish League for Woman Suffrage badge, from the collection of The Women's Library, London School of Economics and Political Science

Bensusan became a member of Emmeline Pankhurst's Women's Social and Political Union (WSPU). In 1907, Bensusan was one of the founder members of the Actresses' Franchise League, alongside Gertrude Elliott, Adeline Bourne, Winifred Mayo and Sime Seruya, initially as the honorary organising secretary. Bensusan wrote three one-act plays for the League and became head of their play department when it was established. Bensusan persuaded other women writers and sympathetic male writers to write plays, monologues or duologues for the League to perform. She made appeals in women's suffrage publications for actresses to send her their touring schedules so that she could cast them in AFL productions.

In 1911, the suffragists were boycotting the 1911 census. As part their protest The Apple by Bensusan was performed at one o'clock in the morning. This was the second time that play was performed.

Bensusan was a member of the Australian and New Zealand Women Voters (ANZVW). She marched with a contingent of 170 Australian and New Zealand women in the Women's Coronation Procession on 17 June 1911, walking alongside suffragists including Constance Clyde, Margaret Fisher (wife of the Australian prime minister Andrew Fisher), Vida Goldstein, Alice Grant Rosman and Madge Titherage.

The following year Bensusan was on the executive committee of the Jewish League for Woman Suffrage, after it was founded in 1912. She was also a member of the Women Writers' Suffrage League (WWSL).

In December 1913, Bensusan formed a women's theatre troupe at the Coronet Theatre in Notting Hill, London, intending to change how women participated in the theatre business and challenge institutionalised sexism. She was interviewed about the troupe by the National Union of Women's Suffrage Societies' Common Cause newspaper, where she said that the company would "give women her proper chance in dramatic arts, both as a professional artist and a typical specimen of her sex."

Bensusan's troupe had one successful season, performing The Gauntlet by Norwegian writer Bjørnstjerne Bjørnson and La Femme Seule by French dramatist Eugène Brieux. The Women's Theatre Company project was interrupted by the outbreak of World War I, during preparations for a production of Where Are You Going To? (the British title of My Little Sister) by American feminist Elizabeth Robins, who was known for her suffrage play Votes for Women!. Bensusan went on to entertain the Allied armies of the occupation in Cologne then with the British Rhine Army Dramatic Company during the war.

In 1946, Bensusan co-founded the House of Arts in Chiswick. Later in life she also became active in the Women's Institute (WI) and campaigned on issues of child welfare.

Bensusan died on 10 October 1967, aged 96.

== Film roles ==
- True Womanhood (1911)
- The Grit of a Jew (1917)
- Adam Bede (1918)

== Works ==
- The Apple (1909)
- Perfect Ladies (1909)
- Nobody's Sweetheart (1911)
- The Prodigal Passes (1914)
- The Singer of the Veldt
- True Womanhood (a film) (1911).

== Other ==
- "The Apple" in Votes for Women and Other Plays (2009), London: Aurora Metro Books.
- Croft, S. Cockroft, I. (2010). Art, Theatre and Women's Suffrage. London: Aurora Metro Books.
