= 1901 United Kingdom census =

Census of the population of the United Kingdom

Census 1901
- 31 March 1901

General information
- Country: United Kingdom

The United Kingdom Census 1901 was the 11th nationwide census conducted in the United Kingdom of Great Britain and Ireland, and was done on 31 March 1901 "relating to the persons returned as living at midnight on Sunday, March 31st".

The total population of the England and Wales, Scotland, and Ireland (including what is now the Republic of Ireland) was 41,458,721 of which 21,356,313 were female and 20,102,406 were male. The foreign-born population was recorded at 1.4%

== Geographic scope ==
It was divided into three parts: England and Wales, Scotland, and Ireland. The census in England, Wales and Scotland was legislated for by the Census (Great Britain) Act 1900. The England and Wales part of the census contains records for 32 million people and 6 million houses. Certain parts of the records have suffered damage and therefore some information is missing, but it is largely complete with the exception of parts of Deal in Kent.

The census of England and Wales does not include the census of Scotland. The Isle of Man is included in the England and Wales returns. The data for the census of Scotland is held by the National Records of Scotland, whereas the census for England and Wales is held by the National Archives.

Prior to the secession of the Irish Free State, the whole of Ireland engaged in the census on the same night, however none of the census returns from Ireland for the 19th century still exist, except for partial returns. The 1901 census is the first complete surviving census, and is available online. The census in Ireland was legislated for by the Census (Ireland) Act 1900.

== Information included ==
The entries for households on the census returns for 1901 fall under the following headings:

- Road, street, town or village, number or name of house
- Whether the house is inhabited or not
- Name and surname of each person
- Relation to Head of Family
- Condition as to marriage
- Age last birthday
- Profession or occupation
- Whether employed or not
- Where born
- Whether deaf and dumb, blind, lunatic, imbecile or feeble-minded
- Also crews of Vessels and residents of Institutions.

The term "idiot" on the 1891 census was replaced by the term "feeble-minded".

== Online access ==
The census data for England and Wales was first published online on 2 January 2002 on a site run by The National Archive. However, by early afternoon that first day, the site had crashed due to huge demand and remained offline for 11 months "Prisoners nailed for loose screws in online census". This went on to spark huge interest in family history and many television series were made based on this and related information. Since then the data has also been available on other sites on a subscription basis. The data is mainly used by genealogists, family historians, name researchers and anyone wanting to know more about their Welsh and English ancestors in 1901. It can also be used to research hamlets, villages and parishes to build a historical perspective.

== See also ==
- Census in the United Kingdom
- Census Enumerators' Books

== References and sources ==
Sources

- Census of England and Wales (63 Vict. C. 4.) 1901: General Report with Appendices (Great Britain. Census Office. H.M. Stationery Office, 1904) p302

Preceded by 1891	UK census 1901	Succeeded by 1911
