= Census (Ireland) Act 1900 =

Act of the Parliament of the United Kingdom

Census (Ireland) Act 1900 (Note: Section 9.)
- Act of Parliament
- Parliament of the United Kingdom
- Long title: An Act for taking the Census for Ireland in the year one thousand nine hundred and one.
- Citation: 63 & 64 Vict. c. 6
- Territorial extent: United Kingdom

Dates
- Royal assent: 9 April 1900
- Commencement: 9 April 1900 (Note: The Acts of Parliament (Commencement) Act 1793.)
- Repealed: Northern Ireland: 23 May 1950; Republic of Ireland:
Other legislation
Repealed by	Statute Law Revision Act 1908; Statute Law Revision Act 1950; Republic of Ireland: Statute Law Revision Act 1983

Status: Repealed

Text of statute as originally enacted

The Census (Ireland) Act 1900 (63 & 64 Vict. c. 6) was an act of the Parliament of the United Kingdom, given royal assent on 9 April 1900.

The act laid down the methods for taking the 1901 United Kingdom census in Ireland. The legislative basis for the census to take place in England, Scotland and Wales was provided by the Census (Great Britain) Act 1900 (63 & 64 Vict. c. 4). The act pertaining to Ireland was repealed in the Republic of Ireland by the Oireachtas passing the Statute Law Revision Act 1983.

== Subsequent developments ==
Part of the act was repealed by section 1 of, and the schedule to, the Statute Law Revision Act 1908 (8 Edw. 7. c. 49), which came into force on 21 December 1908.

The whole act, so far as unrepealed, was repealed by section 1(1) of, and the first schedule to, the Statute Law Revision Act 1950 (14 Geo. 6. c. 6), which came into force on 23 May 1950.
