= Margaret Skirving Gibb =

Scottish suffragette (1877–1954)

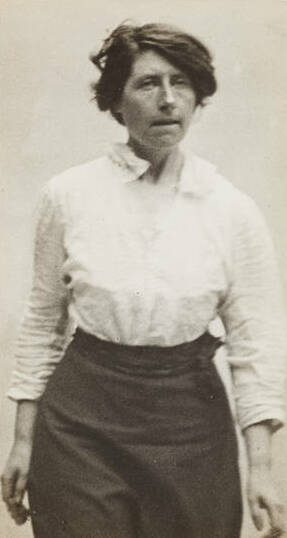
- Born: 1877; Glasgow, Scotland
- Died: 1954 (aged 76–77); Prestwick, South Ayrshire, Scotland
- Known for: Suffrage activism & chess

Margaret Skirving Gibb (1877–1954) was a Scottish suffragette and chess player. She was involved in several suffragette activities including slashing a portrait of one of the founders of the Scottish National Portrait Gallery in 1914.

== Involvement in the campaign for women's suffrage ==
In 1911 Gibb refused to partake in the census, along with her mother and the rest of the family. In March 1914 Gibb was found guilty of striking a constable outside Holloway prison with a dog whip and sentenced to two months in Holloway.

After Emmeline Pankhurst's re-arrest in 1914, Gibb entered the National Portrait Gallery and slashed the portrait of one of gallery's founders, Thomas Carlyle by John Everett Millais. She was sentenced to six months imprisonment. During the reporting of this arrest, she is referred to as Ann Hunt, which she used as an alias. The portrait only went back on display a century later. Following this attack security for women entering the National Portrait Gallery was tightened

She was one of a number of suffragettes photographed when Scotland Yard commissioned the undercover photography of militant suffragettes from 1913. The images were used to identify suffragettes attempting to enter public buildings such as museums and art galleries, where they might attempt to damage the objects.

== Family and life ==
Gibb was born and died in Prestwick, South Ayrshire, Scotland. Her father was Peter Walker Gibb, a fish merchant, and her mother was Margaret Skirving, founder of the Glasgow Ladies Chess Club 1905 and president of the club until her death in 1918. She was one of six siblings, one of whom was fellow suffragette Ellison Scotland Gibb. Ellison and Margaret were awarded the Hunger Strike medals.

== Chess career ==
In 1923, Gibb played, along with her sister, in the Glasgow Ladies' team that reached the final of the 1922-23 season's Spens Cup.
