= Rosina Filippi =

English actress (1866–1930)

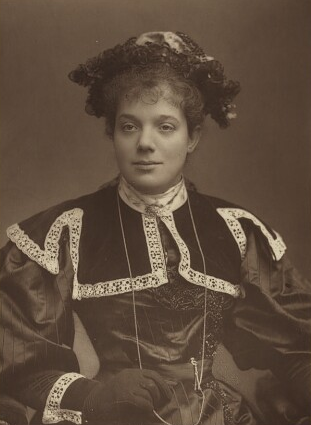
- Rosina Filippi photographed by Alfred Ellis in 1896.
- Born: 1866; Venice, Italy
- Died: 1930 (aged 63–64); Harborne, Birmingham
- Occupation: Actress
- Spouse: Henry Martin Dowson (m. 1891; died 1930)

Rosina Filippi (1866 – 1930) was an Italian-born English stage actress and acting instructor, known for adapting Jane Austen's work to the stage for the first time.

== Life and career ==
Rosina Filippi was born in Venice, Italy. Her father, Filippo Filippi, was a music critic, and her mother, Vaneri Filippi, was a French singer who taught voice at the Milan Conservatoire. According to an obituary in The Times, she and her grandmother on her mother's side, Georgina Colmache, left France during the Paris Commune, when Filippi was five years old, and traveled to London.

Rosina Filippi had wanted to follow in her mother's footsteps and become an opera singer herself but, lacking sufficient vocal talent, pursued acting instead. She studied under Hermann Vezin and debuted at the Gaiety Theatre in 1883. Beerbohm Tree cast her in her first major role: the French maid in The Red Lamp. She became a well-known character actress, with roles including Madame Vinard in Trilby, Martha in Tree's Faust, and Nurse in Romeo and Juliet. George Bernard Shaw attempted to cast her in his play Caesar and Cleopatra as Cleopatra's nurse. She also led an acting school, emphasizing elocution, and directed the Oxford acting troupe the Christmas Dramatic Wanderers, alongside Dorothea Baird.

In 1895, J. M. Dent published Filippi's Duologues and Scenes From the Novels of Jane Austen. The book included seven selections of Austen's works: two from Pride and Prejudice, three from Emma, one from Sense and Sensibility, and one from Northanger Abbey. The selections focused primarily on Austen's women, with 12 female characters to four male, and downplayed the romantic aspects of Austen's works in favor of domestic scenes. They were adapted for two to three actors and intended for drawing room performance, and included eight illustrations demonstrating period-appropriate costumes. This was the first time Austen's works had been adapted for the stage; in her introduction, Filippi wrote: "I am convinced that Jane Austen as a playwright will fascinate her audiences as much as she has her readers as a novelist." The book was praised by most reviewers, though some questioned the viability of adapting Austen's works to the stage. It was widely re-released and anthologized, and led to several more Austen stage adaptations by other playwrights, which one reviewer suggested were spurred by "good-natured envy" of Filippi's work.

In March 1901, her play The Bennetts, based on Pride and Prejudice, premiered at the Royal Court Theatre in London. Harcourt Williams and Winifred Mayo co-directed and they took the leading roles as the heroes Mr. Darcy and Elizabeth Bennet. The plays was well received to a full house with both Mayo and Williams' making able performances. This made Williams the first known actor to play Mr. Darcy on the professional stage.

In April 1914, Filippi, now retired as an actress, began to stage two Shakespeare plays a week at the Old Vic Theatre, as part of what she envisioned as a "people's theatre" projects to stage the playwright's work to the masses at a low cost. These plays included The Merchant of Venice, starring Hermione Gingold, and Romeo and Juliet, starring Filippi's 16-year-old daughter Rosemary. This was the first time Shakespeare had been presented at the theatre; while the theater would become well known for its Shakespeare productions, at the time it was better known for opera. Filippi and manager Lillian Baylis clashed over the matter; Russell Thorndike claimed Baylis placed a slip in the programmes encouraging patrons to spend their money on the Vic's operas instead.

Filippi married Henry Martin Dowson in 1891. She had six children. Her daughter, Rosemary Benvonuta Dowson, would marry Russell Thorndike.

== Death ==
Filippi died in Harborne, Birmingham, at age 64.
