= Florence Earengey =

British suffragette

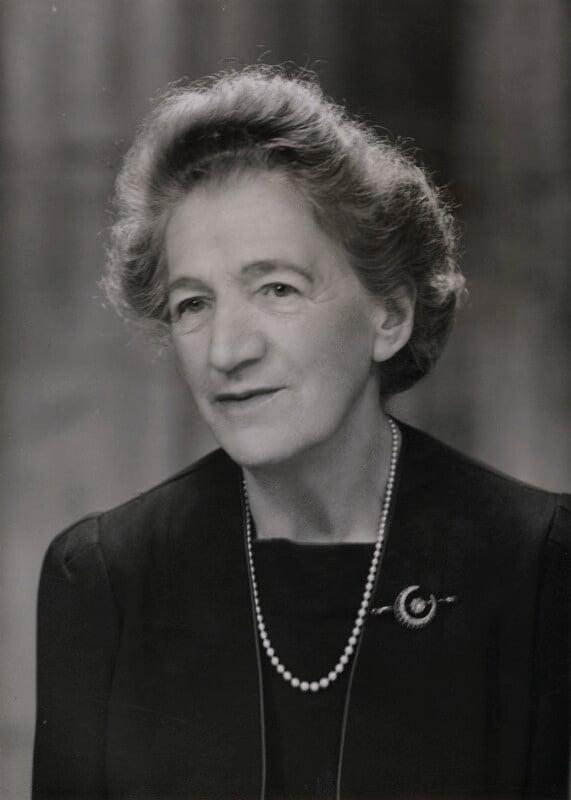
- Earengey in 1949
- Born: Florence How; 1877; Cheltenham, England
- Died: 1963 (aged 85–86)
- Education: North London Collegiate School for Girls; University of London
- Occupations: Suffragette, barrister
- Spouse: William George Earengey
- Children: Elaine Aenone H Earengey

Florence Earengey (née How; 1877–1963) was a British suffragist, barrister and Justice of the Peace. She was a member of the Women's Freedom League.

== Life ==
Born in 1877 in Cheltenham, Earengey was the daughter of John How, a successful grocer and tea dealer. Her sister was Edith How-Martyn, a suffragette who was arrested in 1906 for attempting to make a speech in the House of Commons - one of the first acts of suffrage militancy.

Earengey attended The Hall School in Montpellier in Cheltenham and was then admitted to the North London Collegiate School for Girls in 1892, at the age of 14. Her education continued at the University of London where she achieved a Bachelor of Arts in 1898. She later became a barrister, working as a Justice of the Peace.

In 1899, Earengey married fellow lawyer and progressive William George Earengey. Together they had one child, a daughter - Elaine Aenone H Earengey - born in 1904.

== The Women's Suffrage Movement ==
Earengey described herself as a rebel, attracted to radical causes. She joined the National Union of Women's Suffrage Societies and was in charge of literature for the Cheltenham branch (1907) and was involved in other suffrage organisations; including the Women's Social and Political Union (WSPU), and the Women's Freedom League (1908) where she was honorary secretary and later became president.

She served with the constitutional Women's Suffrage Society (WSS) as a committee member from 1906 to 1910. The Cheltenham Examiner records that she seconded the vote of thanks to Marie Stopes, the future birth control campaigner, at a WSS meeting. Her husband William was also a supporter.

In 1907, there was a split at the top of the WSPU, in part because of discontent with the autocratic rule of the Pankhursts. Earengey's sister, Edith How-Martyn, together with Charlotte Despard and Teresa Billington-Greig, led a breakaway group and formed the Women's Freedom League (WFL). Whilst this group still fought for women's suffrage with a radical agenda (and with a willingness to break the law if necessary) they agreed not to use violence. Earengey became an active leader of the WFL in Cheltenham until the outbreak of war, first as Honorary Secretary and then as President.

Earengey's most notable initiative, organised in collaboration with a WSPU campaign, was the 1911 census evasion, an initiative aiming to distort government figures by persuading women to refuse to supply details for the census forms which, for the first time, were to be filled in by the householder rather than by a census enumerator visiting houses. In correspondence in the Cheltenham Chronicle and Gloucestershire Echo, she opposed the Mayor, who felt that evasion would damage the chances of Cheltenham reaching the 50,000 population figure necessary to gain county borough status, and stressed the importance of local women ‘joining hands with our sisters all over the kingdom'. She herself evaded the census and cannot be found in its records.

== Later career and activism ==
Earengey became a volunteer prison visitor and member of the Discharged Prisoners Aid Service (DPAS) for Holloway Prison in London. She became the chair of DPAS in 1939.

In the 1950s, Earengey was involved with the National Council of Women of Great Britain (NCW) and campaigning for financial support for women to be included in divorce law reforms. At the 1952 NCW conference she presented a resolution that "wives should be legally entitled to a proportion of their husbands ' incomes and also that wives should be liable to maintain their husbands if necessary." Both Earengey and her husband gave evidence to a government commission on divorce.

== Recognition ==
On 10 April 2018, Earengey was commemorated for her efforts to the Cheltenham suffrage movement by the unveiling of a blue plaque at 3 Wellington Square.

== Publications ==
Earengey could be described as pursuing legal feminism through the publication of information intended to educate readers on the legal position of women. In 1949 the National Council of Women of Great Britain published her work The legal and economic status of women. In 1953, this was revised and republished as The Milk White Lamb - The legal and economic status of women.

== See also ==
- List of suffragists and suffragettes
