= Janette Steer =

Actress, playwright, and theatrical manager

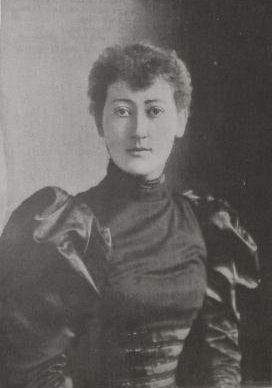
- Steer in The Sketch (1893)
- Born: Janet Gertrude Trevor Steer; 3 July 1863; Calcutta, India
- Died: 24 November 1947 (aged 84); Goring, Oxfordshire, England
- Occupations: Actress; playwright; theatrical manager
- Movement: Actresses' Franchise League

Janette Steer (3 July 1863 – 24 November 1947) was an actress, playwright, theatrical manager, and suffragist based in London.

== Early life ==
Born Janet Gertrude Trevor Steer in Calcutta, India, 3 July 1863, she was the youngest daughter of Charles Steer (1811–1888) who served in the Indian Civil Service, and his Irish-born second wife Janet Ann Wetherall (1820–1889).

== Career ==
Janette Steer began acting as an amateur, with her sister, Mrs. Mackintosh. An early reviewer described the two in 1886: "Mrs. Mackintosh is tall and stout; Miss Steer is tall and thin. Mrs. Mackintosh has a good deal of hard voice; Miss Steer has very little voice at all. Mrs. Mackintosh has some faint glimmerings of histrionic ability; Miss Steer at present has none. They were cheered by their friends, and received bouquets." However, it was Steer who continued in the profession.

In 1900, Steer became manager of the Comedy Theatre. She accepted the role because, as she explained, "I hate having to play parts I don't like, and now I can choose what I please." That year, she appeared in a set of four short works, including W. S. Gilbert's Comedy and Tragedy, Alicia Ramsey's Isla the Chosen, and scenes from Romeo and Juliet (she played Romeo) and Hamlet (she played Hamlet). Steer provoked widely publicized threats of legal action from W. S. Gilbert, when Gilbert was upset by her interpretation of Galatea, at odds with his conception of the character, in a 1900 revival of his Pygmalion and Galatea. A court refused to grant an injunction against Steer in the matter.

Other acting appearances by Steer included the shows Robinson Crusoe (1886, with her sister Mrs. Mackintosh), Idols of the Heart (1891, a play she wrote and acted in), An American Bride (1892), Gudgeons (1893), The Silent Battle (1892-1893), A Bunch of Violets (1894), John-a-Dreams (1894), The Seats of the Mighty (1897), Settled Out of Court (1897), The Liars (1897), Kenyon's Widow (1900), The Sin of a Life (1901), The Queen's Double (1901), A Pageant of Great Women (1909-1910), Edith (1912, produced by the Women Writers' Suffrage League), Honourable Women (1913), and The Sphinx (1914, another suffrage play, which she also wrote), The End of Silence (1915, a wartime fundraiser for the RSPCA), and The Passing of the Third Floor Back (1917, a wartime fundraiser for Scottish Women's Hospitals).

Plays written by Steer included The Cloven Foot (1890), Idols of the Heart (1890), All Sorts and Conditions of Men (1902), Geraldine Wants to Know (1911), and The Sphinx (1914). Steer was a member of the Actresses' Franchise League and wrote an essay "The Suffrage Movement and the Salvation of the Race" for a 1912 suffrage publication.

Janette Steer in theatrical publications
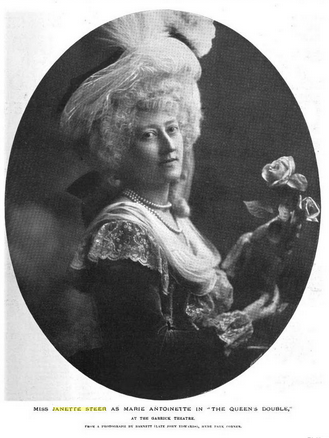
1891 as Marie Antoinette

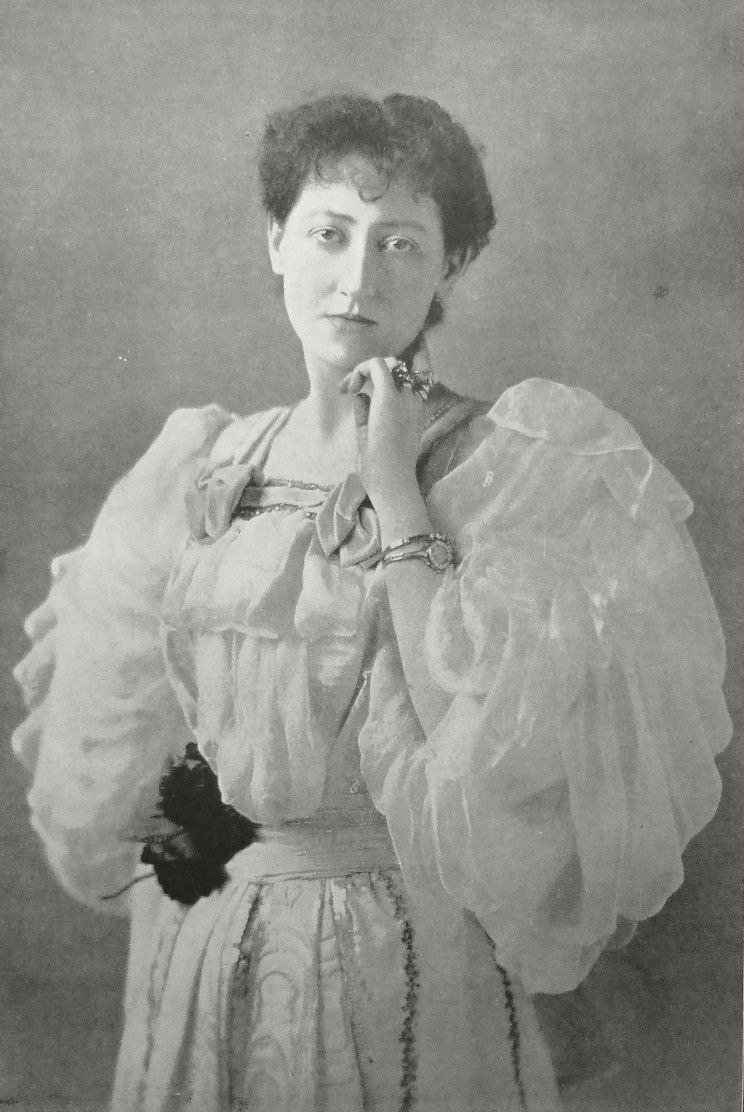
1894 from John-a-Dreams

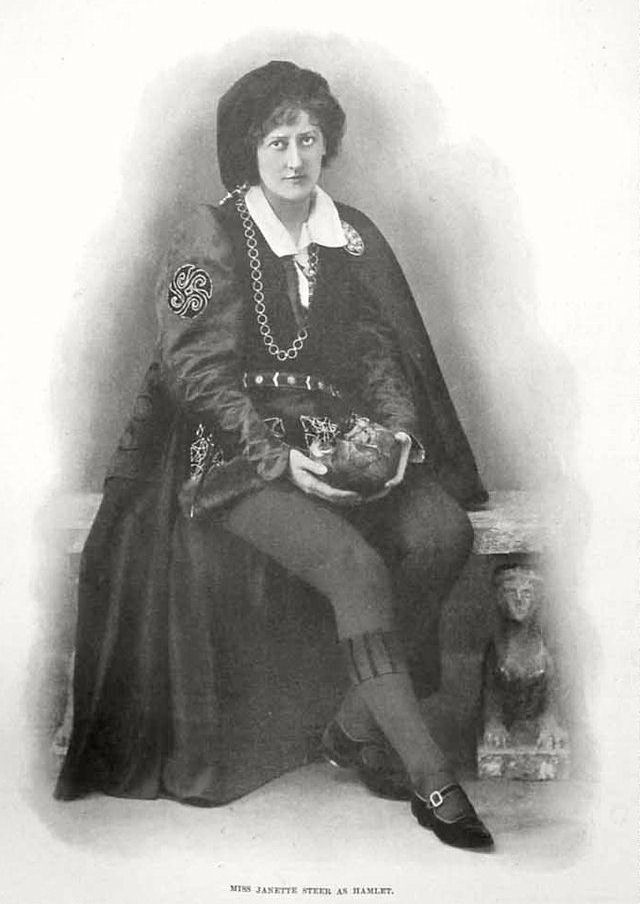
1899 as Hamlet

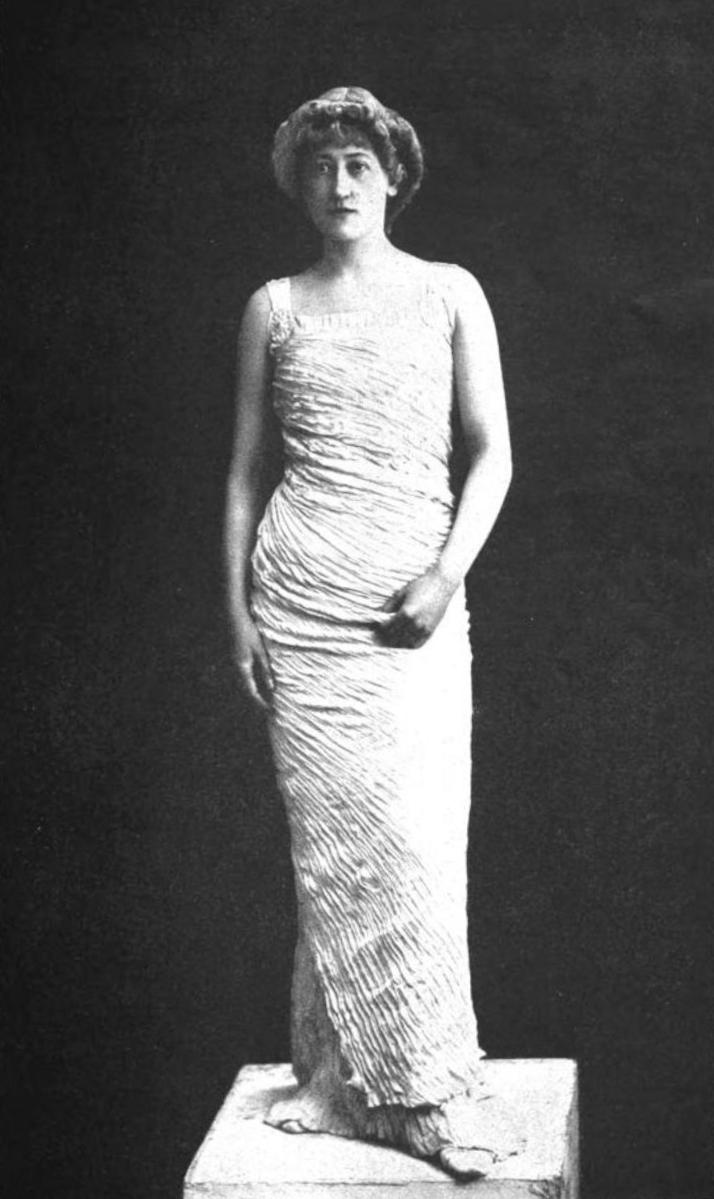
1899 as Galatea

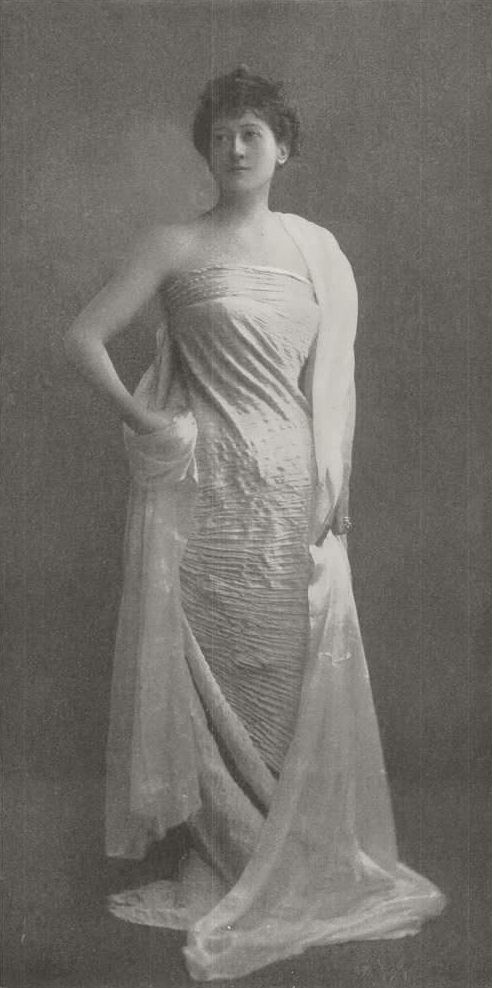
1900 from Kenyon's Widow

== Personal life ==
Steer lived in England, including Addison Avenue, west London in 1921. She died on 24 November 1947 in Goring, Oxfordshire.
