= Annie Coultate =

English teacher and suffragist (1856–1931)

- Born: c. 1856; Fulford, North Yorkshire, England
- Died: 1931; Acomb, Yorkshire, England
- Burial place: St Stephen's Church, Acomb, Yorkshire, England
- Occupation: Teacher
- Known for: Suffragette activism

Annie Coultate (née de Lacy, c. 1856 – 1931) was an English teacher and suffragist in York. She founded the Women's Social and Political Union (WSPU) branch in York in 1910.

== Life ==
Coultate was born in Fulford, North Yorkshire, England, in 1856. She trained as a pupil-teacher and was later employed as assistant head mistress at Fishergate Elementary School in York. She married Frank Coultate in 1881 and they had two children.

== Activism ==
Coultate became involved in campaigning for women's enfranchisement after being inspired by a talk given by Emmeline Pankhurst in York during 1908. She founded the local Women's Social and Political Union (WSPU) branch in York in 1910, when she was 55 years old. Coultate organised speakers from the Scarborough WSPU branch, including Adela Pankhurst and Marion Mackenzie, to address the branch in York, and spoke at Scarborough WSPU meetings in return.

Coultate's activism included selling the Votes for Women newspaper from door to door around York, organising the local suffragette boycott of the 1911 census with Violet Key Jones, and helping Lilian Lenton escape house arrest during her release from prison under the Cat and Mouse Act.

== Death ==
Coultate died in Acomb in 1931 and was buried at St. Stephen's Church, Acomb, North Yorkshire, England.
