= Ellison Scotland Gibb =

Scottish suffragette (1879–1970)

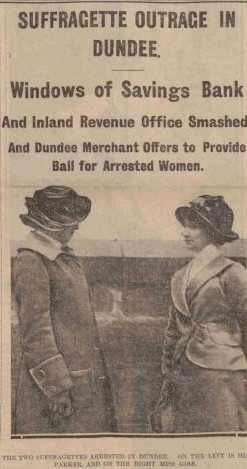
- Frances Parker (left) and Ellison Gibb. Evening Telegraph and Post Wednesday, 30 October 1912, page 1.
- Born: 6 March 1879; Glasgow, Scotland
- Died: 18 May 1970 (aged 91); Ayr, Scotland
- Occupations: Political activist, chess player
- Parent(s): Peter Walker Gibb; Margaret Skirving
- Relatives: Margaret Skirving Gibb (sister)

Ellison Scotland Gibb (6 March 1879 – 1970) was a Scottish suffragette and chess player. She was an active member of the Women's Social and Political Union. In 1910, she was appointed as the honorary secretary of the Actresses' Franchise League in Glasgow. She was arrested and imprisoned on several occasions for her militant activity, and confronted both Churchill and Asquith to make the suffrage case. Her chess career included winning the Scottish Ladies Championship in 1907. and acting as President of the Glasgow Ladies Chess Club from 1921

== Family and life ==
Her father was Peter Walker Gibb, a fish merchant, and her mother was Margaret Skirving. Her mother was founder of the Glasgow Ladies Chess Club 1905 and president of the club until her death in 1918.

She was one of six siblings, one of whom was fellow suffragette Margaret Skirving Gibb. She was a descendant of William Skirving, one of the five Scottish Martyrs for Liberty.

She was born in Glasgow in 1879 and died in Ayr in 1970.

== Suffragette activism ==
Gibb was an active member of the Women's Social and Political Union (1910) and of the Actresses' Franchise League in Glasgow, where she was the honorary secretary. In 1911 she refused to partake in the census, along with her mother and the rest of the family.

She was arrested on five occasions in London between 1910 and 1912., and once in Dundee She was imprisoned on several occasions, three times in Holloway, once in Aylesbury and once in Dundee. During one or more of these imprisonments (sources unclear whether Dundee or Perth prison), she participated in a hunger strike.

On 30 October she and Frances Parker smashed one window, and attempted to smash another in Dundee. In November 1910, she and eight other women were arrested for throwing stones at the premises of the Secretary of State for the Home Department.

In March 1912, she and Frances Parker sat next to Winston Churchill on a train from Stranraer to Glasgow, and asked him his opinion on votes for women and told him of the sufferings of women imprisoned in Holloway. Churchill described his experience with Gibb as "intolerable, disgusting, a nuisance, you are a low woman". In November 1912, she was assaulted by a man named Edwin Heath Smith while she was attempting to protest to Prime Minister H. H. Asquith in Ladybank, Cupar., and brought a successful legal case against him In 1913, she bought Sylvia Pankhurst's Cat and Mouse Act licence (sold in aid of Women's Social and Political Union funds for £100.

There are description and pictures of newspaper articles, prizes and medals on the Chess Scotland Gibb family page, which also shows the Hunger Strike medals awarded to both sisters .

== Chess career ==
In 1907, Ellison Gibb won the Ladies' Minor tournament at the Scottish Ladies' Championship. In 1921, she drew against chess player, Blackburne when he visited the Glasgow Ladies' club on 26 October for a 14-boards simultaneous display. In the same year, she was appointed President of the Glasgow Ladies' Chess Club. She played in the Glasgow Ladies' team that reached the final of the 1922-23 season's Spens Cup.
