= Harcourt Williams =

English actor and director (1880–1957)

- Williams in 1923
- Born: Ernest George Harcourt Williams; 30 March 1880; Croydon, Surrey, England
- Died: 13 December 1957 (aged 77); London, England
- Occupations: Actor, director
- Years active: 1897–1956

Ernest George Harcourt Williams (30 March 1880 – 13 December 1957) was an English actor and director. After early experience in touring companies he established himself as a character actor and director in the West End. From 1929 to 1934 he was director of The Old Vic theatre company; among the actors he recruited were John Gielgud and Ralph Richardson. After directing some fifty plays he resigned the directorship of the Old Vic but continued to appear in the company's productions throughout the rest of his career. He appeared in thirty cinema and television roles during his later years.

== Life and career ==
Williams was born in Croydon, Surrey, the son of John Williams, a merchant. He was educated at Beckenham Abbey and Whitgift Grammar School, Croydon. After taking drama lessons he joined Frank Benson's touring company in 1897. He remained with Benson for five years, and made his London debut at the Lyceum in 1900, playing Sir Thomas Grey in Henry V.

Harcourt Williams both co-directed and starred in Rosina Filippi's adaptation of Jane Austen's Pride and Prejudice, in a play called The Bennets at the Royal Court Theatre in a special matinee on 29 March 1901. He co-directed with Winifred Mayo, doing double duty by acting as hero Mr. Darcy, opposite Mayo's Elizabeth Bennet. The plays was well received to a full house with both Mayo and Williams' making able performances. This made Williams the first known actor to play Mr. Darcy on the professional stage.

He then worked for three other companies, including that of Ellen Terry, which he joined in 1903.

In 1906 Williams made his American debut, with H.B. Irving, touring the US for a year. After returning to Britain he was in George Alexander's company before returning for another period with Irving. He married the actress Jean Sterling Mackinlay in 1908. Their son John Sterling became a well-known pianist.

In the First World War, as a conscientious objector, he volunteered for the Friends' Ambulance Unit.

One of Williams's most notable parts of this period was General Lee in John Drinkwater's Abraham Lincoln in 1919; he later switched to the role of the Chronicler in the same production. In 1922, in Mary Stuart by Drinkwater, he was "exquisitely repulsive" as Darnley. In a third historical drama by the same author he was John Hampden in Oliver Cromwell at His Majesty's in 1923, to the Cromwell of Henry Ainley. In 1923 he directed G K Chesterton's play Magic at the Everyman Theatre. In 1926 he appeared in John Barrymore's production of Hamlet at the Haymarket Theatre, as the Player King.

In 1929, when he was forty-nine, Lilian Baylis appointed Williams as the new director of her Old Vic theatre company. He was responsible for engaging first John Gielgud and then Ralph Richardson to join the Old Vic as leading man. Over the next four years Williams directed about fifty plays for the company, also acting in many of the productions. He expanded the Old Vic's traditional repertoire to include modern works by Bernard Shaw and others. The biographer Jonathan Croall writes of Williams:

A sweet, gentle and trusting man, a conscientious objector during the Great War, he was universally known as Billie, and as a vegetarian lived on Bemax [a wheatgerm healthfood] and bread and cheese. … But behind the eccentric façade was a fanatical enthusiast for the theatre. … Williams was an imaginative producer, with a great feel for Shakespeare's poetry, and a desire to introduce a more psychological interpretation of character. He was also a man with a mission: to get rid of the mannered "Shakespearean voice", to break down the deliberate style of verse-speaking which made productions over-long and tedious. … Scene changes, which often held up the action, would be swift and simple. Above all, the text would be inviolate.

After leaving the directorship of the Old Vic, handing over to Tyrone Guthrie after the 1933–34 season, Williams frequently accepted invitations to act with the company, for Guthrie and his successors. He appeared in thirty film and television roles between 1944 and 1956, including a supporting role as the ambassador in the film classic Roman Holiday alongside Audrey Hepburn. In 1953 he appeared in A Day by the Sea by N.C. Hunter. Williams celebrated his golden jubilee as an actor while appearing in a long-running production of Shaw's You Never Can Tell described by The Times as "the liveliest show in town". He died in London after a long illness, aged 77.

=== Screen roles ===
Williams's cinema and television roles were:

Year	Title	Role	Notes
1944	Henry V	Charles VI of France	
1947	Brighton Rock	Prewitt	
1948	Vice Versa	Judge	
1948	Hamlet	First Player	
1948	No Room at the Inn	Rev Mr Allworth	
1949	Third Time Lucky	Doc	
1949	For Them That Trespass	Second judge	
1949	Trottie True	Duke of Wellwater	
1949	The Lost People	Priest	
1949	Under Capricorn	Coachman	
1950	The Frog Prince	Script	TV
1950	The Admirable Crichton	Earl of Loam	TV
1950	The Lady's Not for Burning	Hebble Tyson, the Mayor	TV
1950	Thérèse Raquin	Monsieur Michaud	TV
1950	The Master Builder	Dr Herdal	TV
1950	Your Witness	Richard Beamish, Sam's Solicitor	
1950	Cage of Gold	Dr Kearn	
1950	A Midsummer Night's Dream	Peter Quince, the carpenter	TV
1951	The Late Edwina Black	Dr Septimus Prendergast	
1951	Green Grow the Rushes	Chairman of the bench	
1951	The Magic Box	Tom, workman at Lege & Co	
1952	Music at Night	Charles Bendrex	TV
1952	The Bishop's Treasure	The Bishop	TV
1952	The King and the Mockingbird	The Old Beggar	Voice
1953	Time Bomb	Vicar	
1953	The Blakes Slept Here	Narrator	
1953	Roman Holiday	Ambassador	
1955	The Flying Eye	Professor Murdoch	
1955	The Hideaway	Mr Collins	TV
1955	The Adventures of Quentin Durward	Bishop of Liége	
1956	The Advancing Shadow	George Cornelius	TV
1956	Around the World in 80 Days	Hinshaw – Reform Club Aged Steward	(final film role)

- Source: British Film Institute
