= Marion Mackenzie =

British medical doctor and suffragette (1873–1951)

- Born: c. 1873; Normanton, West Yorkshire, England
- Died: 1951; Leeds, West Yorkshire, England
- Occupation: medical doctor
- Organization: Women's Social and Political Union

Marion Ellen Mackenzie (c.1873–1951) was a British medical doctor and suffragette based in Scarborough, North Yorkshire.

== Life ==
Mackenzie was born in 1873 in Normanton, West Riding of Yorkshire.

Mackenzie worked as a medical doctor and contributed to publications such as The British Medical Journal. She also gave talks to The Parents National Education Union, such as on the topic of "Health in the Home" in 1907.

Mackenzie was a suffragette and worked closely with Adela Pankhurst to build a local Women's Social and Political Union (WSPU) branch in Scarborough. She served as branch treasurer and later as secretary. She also gave speeches at the WSPU branch in York, organised by Annie Coultate.

Mackenzie was arrested on 18 November 1910 as part of a WSPU deputation to deputation to Westminsterin London. She also participated in the suffragette boycott of the 1911 census.

In her later life Mackenzie lived in Leeds and worked at a local hospital. She died in 1951.

== Legacy ==
A plaque commemorating the former WSPU office was erected by the Scarborough and District Civic Society at 33 St Nicholas Cliff, Scarborough, on International Women's Day in 2024.
