= Violet Key Jones =

Anglo-Irish writer and suffragette (1883–1958)

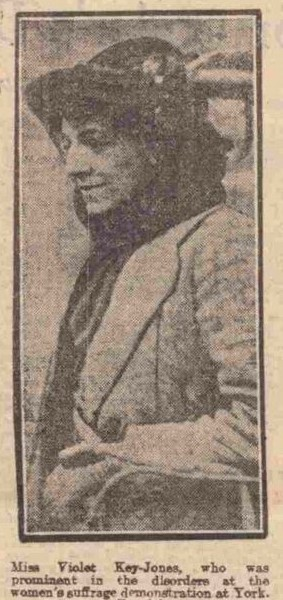
- Born: 17 June 1883; County Kildare, Ireland
- Died: 30 August 1958 (aged 75); Bradford, Yorkshire, England
- Burial place: Scholemoor Cemetery, Bradford, Yorkshire, England
- Movement: Women's Social and Political Union (WSPU)

Violet Frances Key Jones (17 June 1883 – 30 August 1958) was an Anglo-Irish writer and suffragette who was the treasurer of the Women's Social and Political Union (WSPU) branch in York, England.

== Early life ==
Key Jones was born in County Kildare, Ireland in 1883. Her parents were John Jones, an army surgeon, and his wife Harriet Jones (née Key), who came from a Yorkshire gentry family. Her maternal uncle was Captain William Key, Lord of Water Fulford Hall, Yorkshire, and she had a brother who became a railway engineer. After her father died, Key Jones and her family moved back to Yorkshire in 1900.

== Activism ==
Key Jones became involved in the suffrage movement and was the treasurer of the York branch of the WSPU, which had been founded by Annie Coultate in 1910. A year later she was employed by the WSPU as their first paid York and Doncaster organiser for the suffrage campaign. She organised public meetings and protests from her Doncaster office on Hall Gate, and her home on Osbourne Road in York became a safe house for suffragettes, such as Lilian Lenton, Kathleen Brown and Augusta Mary Ann Winship. Her travels between York and Doncaster by train earned her the nickname "the Railway Suffragette."

In February 1911, Key Jones was one of the performers in three plays staged at the York Assembly Rooms by the WSPU in association with the Actresses’ Franchise League. One show was titled "How the vote was won". When the 1911 census was taken, Key Jones organised the suffragette boycott in York and herself evaded being enumerated.

In 1912, 18-year-old journalist Harry Johnson, a supporter of women's enfranchisement and possible member of the Men's Political Union (MPU), was sentenced to a year's imprisonment in Wakefield Gaol with hard labour for attempting to blow up a house near Doncaster for the cause. He went on hunger strike and was released temporarily from prison under the Cat and Mouse Act, and Key Jones, along with Annie Seymour Pearson and Annie Coultate, helped him to evade rearrest. Key Jones was lucky to not have been implicated and arrested herself, as detectives searching the grounds of a suspect property found her name on a piece of paper with a copy of The Suffragette newspaper, two gallons of paraffin and a box of fire-lighters.

Also in 1912, Key Jones jumped onto the running board of Sir Walter Worsley's car during the opening ceremony of the "Open Air School" in York and scattered Votes for Women pamphlets. The same year the WSPU hosted an open-air meeting at Waterdale in Doncaster and a crowd of anti-suffragists attacked the event, heckling the speaker Barbara Wylie, snatching away leaflets and throwing rotten eggs and orange peel until the meeting was broken up. Key Jones was one of the organisers of the event who had to be escorted to safety by bodyguards and the local police. She later said about the event: "this sort of rowdyism can only help the cause... I would have spoken if I could make my voice heard above the noise".

In March 1913, Key Jones chained herself to a chair, heckled and disrupted a meeting held by the anti-suffrage politicians Phillip Snowden and Keir Hardie at the Exhibition Buildings in York. She was ejected from the meeting and arrested.

Key Jones continued campaigning for women's rights after the Representation of the People Act 1918 was passed. In 1919, she worked as general and organising secretary of the Women's Industrial League, whose founding president was Margaret Haig Thomas, 2nd Viscountess Rhondda. As part of her role, she wrote letters to the British engineering magazine The Engineer.

== Later life ==
Key Jones died in 1958 in Bradford and was buried at Scholemoor Cemetery.

== Legacy ==
In 2019 a plaque was placed on Coney Street by the York Civic Trust in partnership with Pilot Theatre and the Theatre Royal to commemorate the office headquarters where York's suffragettes organised and campaigned.
