= Annie Seymour Pearson =

British suffragette (1873–1956)

Annie Pearson
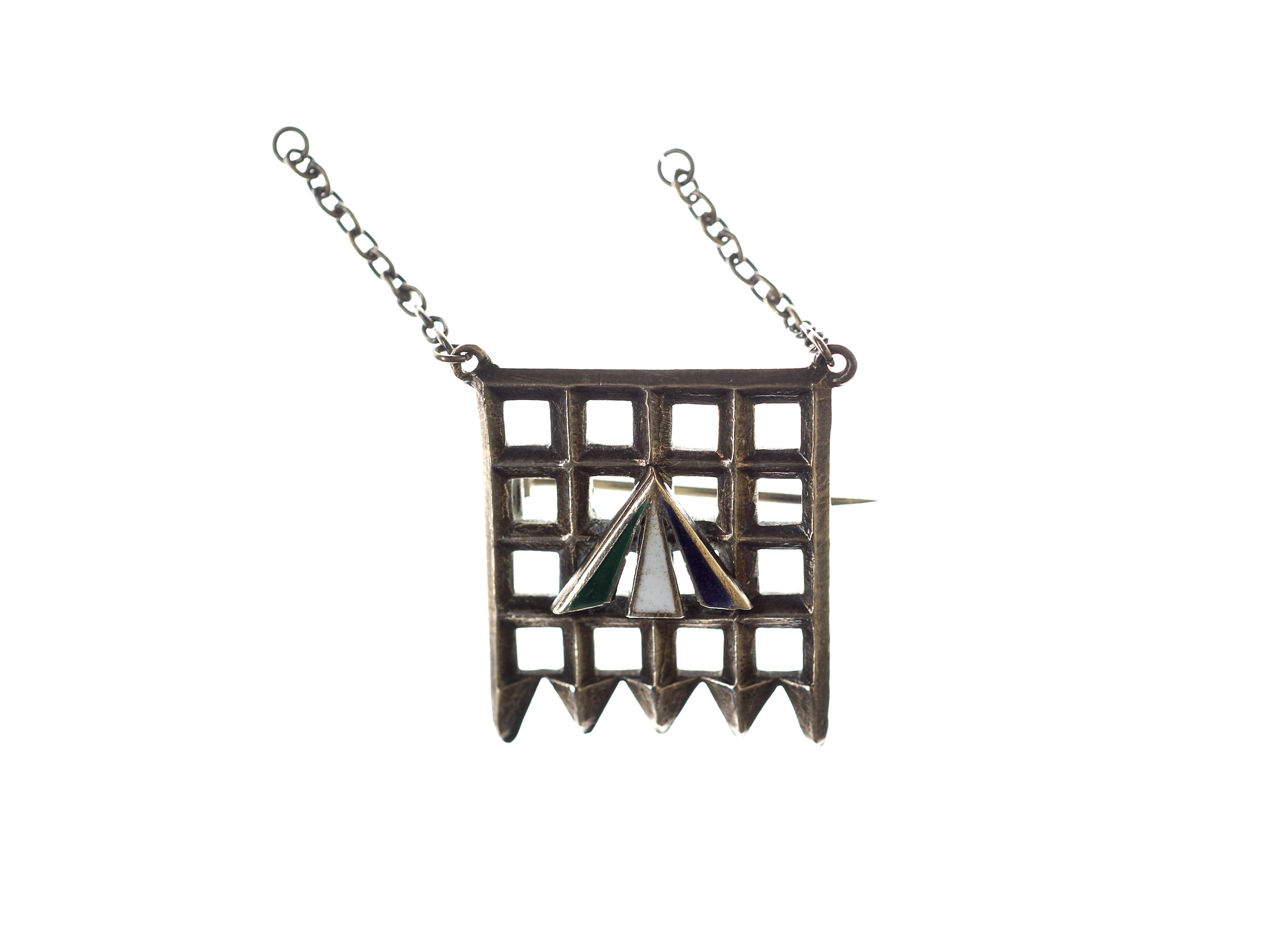
- WSPU prison brooch of the type awarded to Pearson
- Born: Annie Jane Bennett; 1873; Bolsover, Derbyshire, England
- Died: 1956 (aged 82–83)
- Known for: Suffragette
- Spouse: Arthur Seymour Pearson
- Children: Four

Annie Jane Bennett Pearson (née Bennett, 1873–1956), also known as Annie Seymour Pearson, was a British women's suffrage activist who ran a safe house for suffragettes evading police.

== Personal life ==
Pearson was born at Bolsover, Derbyshire in 1873 and was known as Nancy or Nance to friends. She was married to Arthur, had four children (surviving children were Elsa, Francis and Roland), and lived in York.

== Activism ==
Pearson was a supporter of votes for women and was both arrested for her militant campaigning and supported others to evade arrest. In 1912,18-year-old journalist Harry Johnson, a supporter of women's enfranchisement and possible member of the Men's Political Union (MPU), was sentenced to a year's imprisonment in Wakefield Gaol with hard labour for attempting to blow up a house near Doncaster for the cause. He went on hunger strike and was released temporarily from prison under the Cat and Mouse Act, and Pearson, along with Violet Key Jones, helped him to evade rearrest. Pearson also set up her own safe house for suffragettes and supporters.

In 1913, Pearson went to protest at the House of Commons and walked arm-in-arm with a nurse from Birmingham towards Downing Street. She was arrested, charged with obstructing the police, and summoned to appear in court on 18 January 1913. Pearson was sentenced to a choice of a 40 shilling fine, or time in prison and opted for prison. Two days later her husband paid the 25 shillings and sixpence fine, and Pearson was released from Holloway.

After returning to York, Pearson received a Women's Social and Political Union (WSPU) prison brooch, and was invited to the next WSPU prisoners' reception where she was thanked for her contribution. She was interviewed by a reporter from The Yorkshire Herald during which she explained her motivation for travelling to the demonstration and what happened when there.

== In popular culture ==
In 2017, York Theatre Royal and Pilot Theatre staged Everything Is Possible: The York Suffragettes a play about Pearson and other suffragettes. Pearson was a central character who was played by professional actress Barbara Marten. Maten has said that "the house in Heworth Green, where she ran a safe house, no longer stands and there’s no blue plaque. Even her obituary made no mention of her having been a Suffragette.”
