= Joan Cather =

British suffragette

- Born: Joan Waller; 1882
- Died: 1967 (aged 84–85)
- Other names: Josephine Carter (alias)
- Known for: Hunger Strike Medal; 1911 Census refusal
- Movement: Suffragette and also member of Church League for Women's Suffrage
- Spouse(s): Lt. John Leonard Cather, Rtd.
- Honours: Hunger Strike Medal Holloway Brooch

Joan Cather (1882–1967) was a suffragette, awarded a Hunger Strike Medal, 'For Valour' and a Holloway brooch for imprisonment in the cause of women's rights to vote, and also as protest refused to take part in the 1911 British Census.

== Life and Activism ==
Born Joan Waller in 1882, she married John Leonard Cather in 1908. Her husband was a former Royal Navy Lieutenant and on leaving the service became by 1911 Census, a Motor Body Builder.

Cather was not recorded in the 1911 Census, along with other women participating in the suffragette census boycott, refusing to be "counted" if they had no right to vote. Her husband supported her position as he had annotated the census form that he had 'conscientious scruples' as head of household to note any 'female occupants' to avoid the census statistics being used by legislators for 'further vexatious legislation' against women 'in which they have no voice'. He went on to say he would provide the information if the Conciliation Committee Bill passed into law. The Registrar did however note two females as 'the probable number'.

Lt. Cather also joined in 1912 the Men's League for Women's Suffrage and was honorary secretary, and also was by 1914, chairman of the Finance Committee of the Church League for Women's Suffrage, where Joan Cather was the honorary propaganda secretary. This organisation aimed to "Secure the Vote in Church and State as it is, or may be granted to men." It was over a century later that females were permitted to be ordained as bishops within the Church of England. The Church League in 1914 allowed individuals to participate in other movements for the cause of women's equality but their own organisation's 'only methods.. are those of Prayer and Education".

== Imprisonment and recognition ==
Cather was awarded a Women's Social and Political Union (WSPU) Hunger Strike Medal for her imprisonment on 4 March 1912, a date when many women were arrested for a militant campaign of window-breaking. She used the alias Josephine Carter when arrested. The citation engraved on the bar is 'For Valour' and the inscription says

"PRESENTED TO JOAN CATHER BY THE WOMEN'S SOCIAL AND POLITICAL UNION IN RECOGNITION OF A GALLANT ACTION, WHEREBY THROUGH ENDURANCE TO THE LAST EXTREMITY OF HUNGER AND HARDSHIP A GREAT PRINCIPLE OF POLITICAL JUSTICE WAS VINDICATED."

The medal ribbons were in the WSPU colours of green white and purple. Cather's medal is held in the collection of the British Museum.

Cather was also given a Holloway brooch also by the Women's Social and Political Union in recognition of her suffering for the cause.
