= Census (Great Britain) Act 1900 =

Act of the Parliament of the United Kingdom

Census (Great Britain) Act 1900 (Note: Section 13(2).)
- Act of Parliament
- Parliament of the United Kingdom
- Long title: An Act for taking the Census for Great Britain in the year one thousand nine hundred and one.
- Citation: 63 & 64 Vict. c. 4
- Territorial extent: England and Wales; Scotland; (Note: Section 13(1).)

Dates
- Royal assent: 27 March 1900
- Commencement: 27 March 1900 (Note: The Acts of Parliament (Commencement) Act 1793.)
- Repealed: 23 May 1950
Other legislation
Repealed by	Statute Law Revision Act 1908; Statute Law Revision Act 1950

Status: Repealed

Text of statute as originally enacted

The Census (Great Britain) Act 1900 (63 & 64 Vict. c. 4) was an act of the Parliament of the United Kingdom, given royal assent on 27 March 1900 and since repealed.

It laid down the methods for taking the United Kingdom Census 1901, providing that it would take place on Sunday the 31st of March and be administered by the Local Government Board. The information to be recorded was broadly the same as in previous years - the name, sex, age, occupation, marital status, birthplace, and nationality where appropriate, along with the relation to the head of the family, for every person staying in that house on the night of the census day. If any of these people were "blind or deaf and dumb, or imbecile or lunatic" this was to be recorded. Information was, as usual, also to be gathered from aboard ship, as well as in prisons, hospitals, workhouses, asylums, etc.

A limited amount of information on housing was also gathered; if the occupier lived in less than five rooms, they were to state the number of rooms occupied. In Scotland, the number of rooms in each dwelling which possessed windows, inclusive of the kitchen, was to be recorded.

The information was to be held by the Registrar General, who would compile a preliminary report within five months and a full report as soon as practicable.

The act only applied in Great Britain – England, Scotland and Wales – with the Irish census provided for by a separate act, the Census (Ireland) Act 1900 (63 & 64 Vict. c. 6). There were, however, some small differences in the way the census was to be handled in each. In Wales and Monmouth each person above the age of three was to state if they spoke Welsh or English, or a mixture of both. In Scotland, the relevant authorities were the Secretary of State for Scotland and the Registrar General for Scotland, and each person above the age of three was to state if they spoke Gaelic or English, or a mixture of both.

== Subsequent developments ==
Part of the act was repealed by section 1 of, and the schedule to, the Statute Law Revision Act 1908 (8 Edw. 7. c. 49), which came into force on 21 December 1908.

The whole act, so far as unrepealed, was repealed by section 1(1) of, and the first schedule to, the Statute Law Revision Act 1950 (14 Geo. 6. c. 6), which came into force on 23 May 1950.
