= Adeline Bourne =

Anglo-Indian actress, suffragette and charity worker

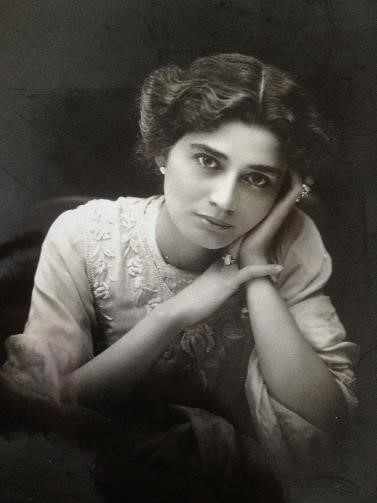
- Born: Selina "Lena" Manson; 8 January 1873; British India
- Died: 8 February 1965 (aged 92); Thurston, Suffolk, England
- Occupations: actress, suffragette and charity worker
- Employer: Queen Mary's Army Auxiliary Corps
- Organization(s): Actresses' Franchise League, Royal Star and Garter Home

Adeline Bourne (8 January 1873 – 8 February 1965) was a British Anglo-Indian actress, suffragette and charity worker.

== Early life ==
Bourne was born Selina "Lena" Manson in British India in 1873. She was sent to private schools in Eastbourne and Blackheath, though after expulsion from three schools was educated by a governess.

== Acting career ==
She studied drama under Sarah Thorne and adopted the stage name Adeline Bourne. She became a member of Thorne's company before leaving to tour America with Mrs Patrick Campbell. She then worked for J. E. Vedrenne and Harley Granville-Barker at the Court Theatre, and for Olga Nethersole.

At the start of the 20th century Bourne appeared in avant-garde and feminist plays. She was known for playing "orientalist" heroines, such as titular character Salome in Oscar Wilde's play, who she played as an "emancipated virago" and "political princess"; Antistia in John Masefield's The Tragedy of Pompey the Great; and Ftatateeta and later Cleopatra in George Bernard Shaw's Caesar and Cleopatra. Other roles included Gertrude in Hamlet.

== Activism ==
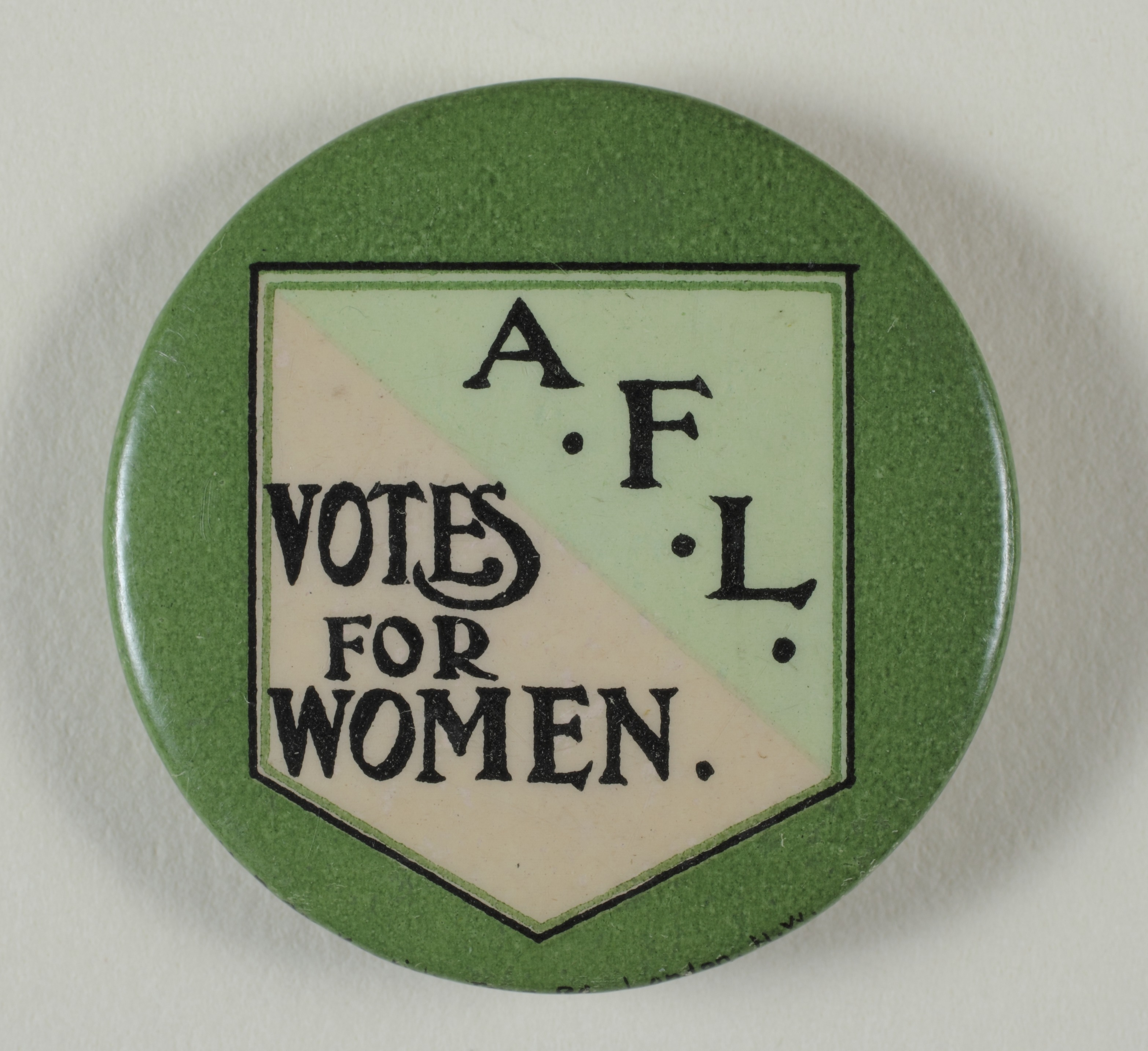
Actresses Franchise League Badge

Bourne was interested in the women's suffrage movement and attended some early National Union of Women Suffrage Societies (NUWSS) meetings, but was initially "frightened of the militants" and concerned about how activism could impact her acting career. She became a constitutional suffragist and campaigned for the cause.

In 1908 she founded the Actresses' Franchise League (AFL) with Gertrude Elliott, Winifred Mayo and Sime Seruya. She served as the League's honorary secretary, until resigning in 1912 due to travelling to America. When in England, she was often seen advertising AFL performances on the streets of the West End. She took part in the Pageant of Great Women in 1910, playing a Woman who appeals to Justice against the tyranny of Prejudice and calls upon witnesses including the Learned Women, the Artists, the Saintly Women, the Rulers and The Warriors. Bourne also set up the New Players Society in 1911.

In 1915, Bourne founded the British Women's Hospital, which raised £150,000 to establish the Royal Star and Garter Home for disabled soldiers. During World War I she served abroad as an officer in Queen Mary's Army Auxiliary Corps, organising entertainment for soldiers on leave at the British Empire Leave Club in Cologne, which had been founded by Decima Moore.

Between 1915 and 1963 Bourne raised over £750,000 for different causes. For example, she raised £37,500 for the Elizabeth Garrett Anderson Hospital. In 1928 she was Vice President of the Association for Moral and Social Hygiene's Josephine Butler Appeal Fund. After World War II she started a women's employment organization to help women return to civilian jobs. In the mid-1950s she established the Wayfarers' Trust, a nursing home and hospital for older people.

On her 90th birthday she gave interviews to newspapers, including the Daily Mail and Evening Standard, about her memories of being a suffragette.

== Death and legacy ==
Bourne's died in Thurston, Suffolk, and was buried in the village churchyard.

In 1965 a fire destroyed her former home in Thurston. Though her papers were rescued from the fire, they were subsequently destroyed in 2013.

In 2018, Helen Geake, former Time Team presenter and Green Party candidate for Bury St Edmunds, tracked down her grave and planted violet primroses with local residents for International Women's Day.
