= Winifred Mayo =

British actor, director, translator and suffragette

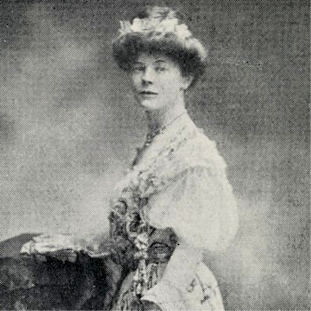
- Born: Winifred Monck Mason; 8 November 1869; Mumbai
- Died: 18 February 1967 (aged 97)
- Known for: actor, suffragette and social reform

Winifred Mayo born Winifred Monck Mason (8 November 1869 – 18 February 1967) was a British actress, director, translator and suffragette. She was a co-founder of the Actresses' Franchise League and the secretary of the Six Point Group which called for social reform.

== Life ==
Mayo was born in Mumbai in 1869. Her parents were Alice Portia (born Wolley) and Thomas Monck-Mason. Her father, who was a civil servant, died in 1874 and Mayo was educated in Britain. In 1881 her family were living in Bath. Her siblings were Roger Henry, Edith Mary and Thomas George. Her sister Dorothea died when young. The family lived in Exmouth in Devon where Mayo did her first acting. By the twentieth century Mayo and her mother were living in London.

== Actor and director ==
Mayo co-directed and starred in Rosina Filippi's adaptation of Jane Austen's Pride and Prejudice. The play was called The Bennets and it was performed at the Royal Court Theatre in a special matinee on 29 March 1901. She co-directed the play with Harcourt Williams. Williams appeared as Mr. Darcy and Mayo played Elizabeth Bennet. The play was well received to a full house with both Mayo and Williams' noted for their able performances.

Mayo's next project was not so successful. She decided to translate Gabriele d'Annunzio's play La Giaconda which had been written for the leading Italian actress Eleonora Duse. The play involved a love triangle where a husband is torn between the love of his wife and that of his muse. A review in The Era newspaper in 1907 suggested it would not appeal to "healthy-minded" British citizens. In the same year she and her mother joined the Women’s Social and Political Union's branch in Kensington.

== Suffragette ==
In 1908 she was part of the suffragette's militant campaign. She joined the deputation that went from Caxton Hall to the House of Commons and as a result she was sentenced to six weeks in prison. She wrote an account of this for "The Idler". In 1908 she wrote about her prison experience and she co-founded the Actresses' Franchise League with Gertrude Elliott, Adeline Bourne and Sime Seruya at a meeting in London's Criterion Restaurant. The league's work included helping those who needed to speak publicly and also giving advice on make-up and clothing to suffragettes who were trying to avoid attention (and arrest). She was arrested again in 1909 and 1910 but she was not charged.

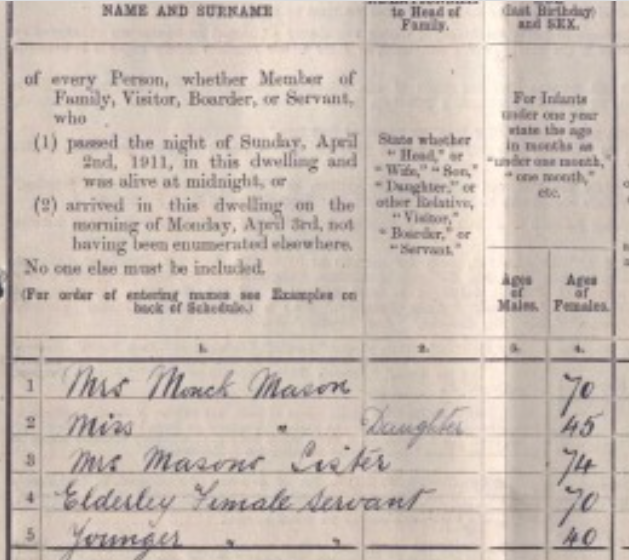
Suffragettes at No. 93 Oakley Street, Chelsea

No. 93 Oakley Street, Chelsea was home to several suffragettes on 2 April 1911, who refused to complete the 1911 census because "If women don’t count, neither shall they be counted". However, the enumerator was able to confirm from the neighbours that the head of the house was Mrs Monck Mason, who lived there with her daughter, her sister, and two servants.

In 1911/12 the suffragettes intensified their campaign to include breaking windows. Mayo was involved and she broke a window at the Guard's Club and while arrested she broke another. She was sentenced to a fortnight in jail, but she later recalled that some of the guard officers were interested enough to attend a suffragette meeting, In 1912 her mother was also arrested for a similar offence.

== Reformer ==
The Six Point Group was founded by Lady Rhondda in 1921 to make changes to British law. The membership included many ex-suffragettes and suffragists and the secretary for the first five years was Mayo. In December 1932 the group was invited to talk to the Ministry of Labour and the deputation consisted of the MP Eleanor Rathbone, Eva Hubback of the National Union for Equal Citizenship, Rae Strachey for the Women's National Service League and Mayo.

In 1958 Mayo was interviewed by the BBC where she recounted her time as a suffragette including the attack on the Guard's Club.

She died aged 97 on 18 February 1967 and her obituary noted her devotion to social reform.
