= Actresses' Franchise League =

Women's suffrage organisation

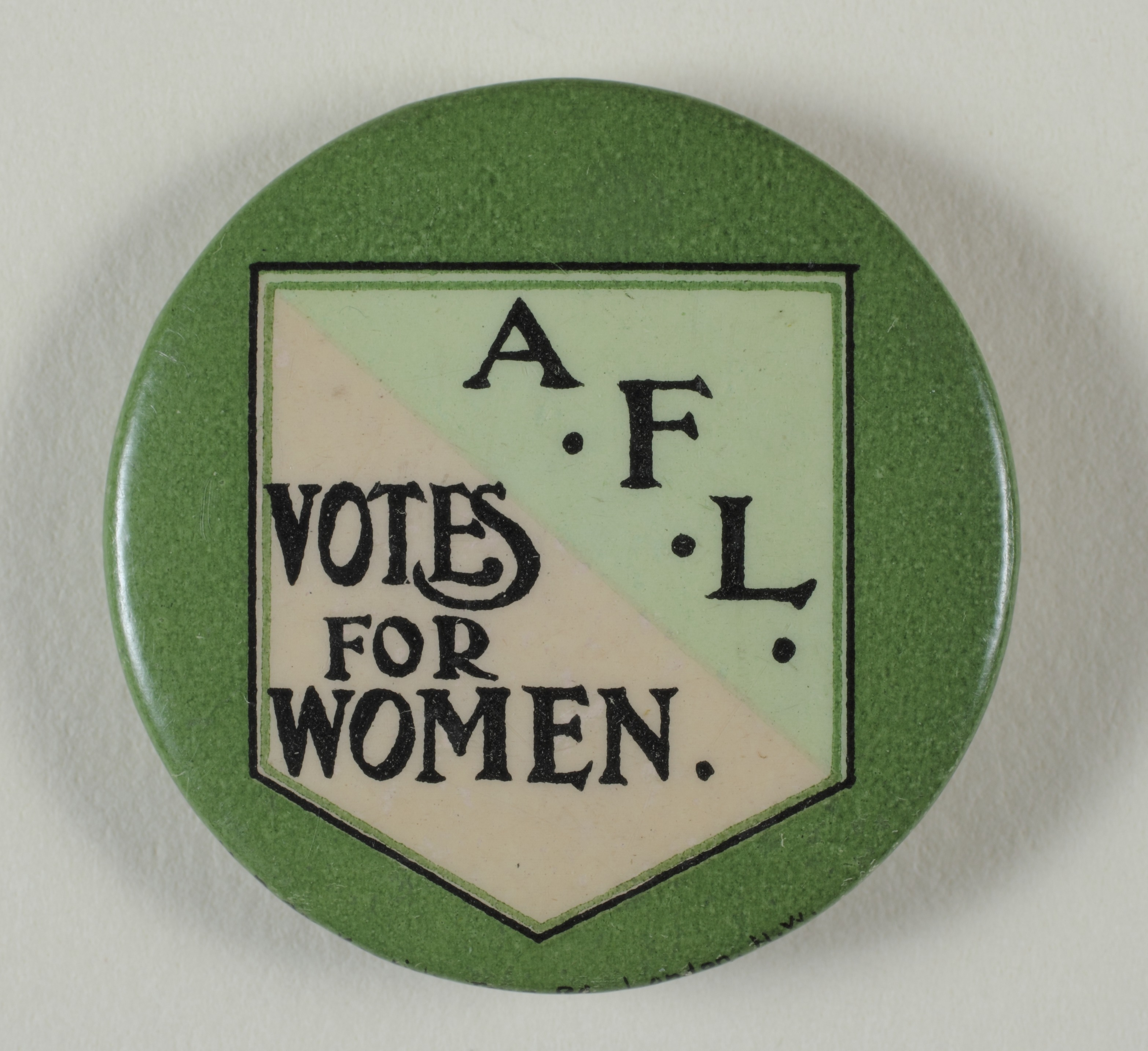
- Actresses Franchise League Badge
- Formation: 1908
- Founder: Gertrude Elliott; Adeline Bourne; Winifred Mayo; Sime Seruya
- Founded at: London, England
- Dissolved: 1958
- Leader: Madge Kendal

The Actresses' Franchise League was a women's suffrage organisation, mainly active in England.

== Founding ==
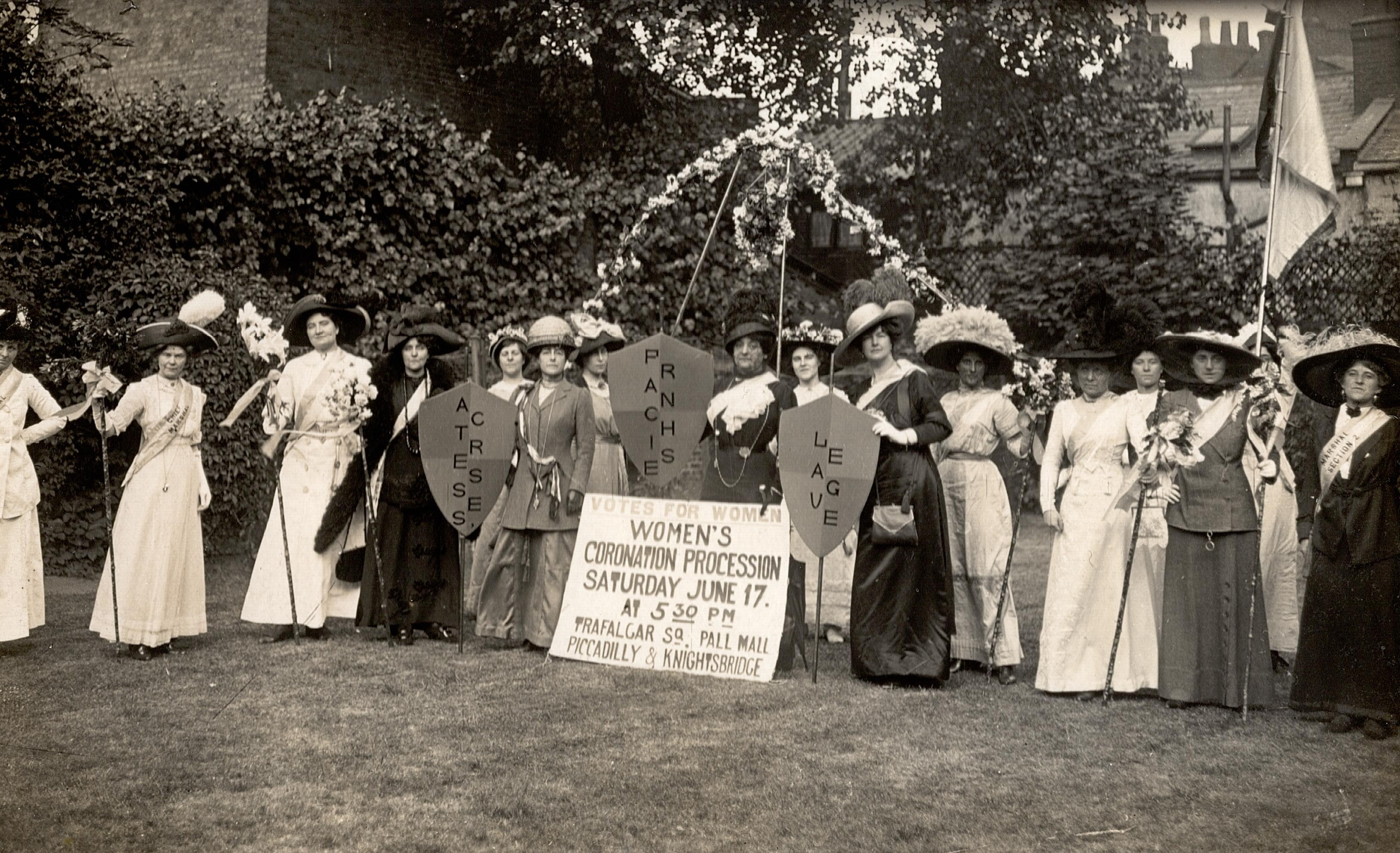
Actresses Franchise League at the Women's Coronation Procession on 17 June 1911

In 1908 the Actresses' Franchise League was founded by Gertrude Elliott, Adeline Bourne, Winifred Mayo and Sime Seruya at a meeting in the Criterion Restaurant in London. While "actresses" are specified in the organisation's name, any woman who was or had been in the theatrical profession was welcome to join.

British actresses who joined included Sybil Thorndike, Italia Conti, Inez Bensusan, Madge Kendal, Gertrude Elliott, Ellen Terry, Lillah McCarthy, Decima Moore, Cicely Hamilton, Beatrice Forbes-Robertson Hale, Christabel Marshall, Lena Ashwell, Edith Craig, Janette Steer, Ellison Scotland Gibb, Violet Key Jones, Ellen Kate Limouzin and Lillie Langtry.

The group had three main objectives:

1. To convince members of the Theatrical profession of the necessity of extending the franchise to women.

2. To work for Votes for Women on the same terms as they are, or may be, granted to men by educational methods.

3. To assist all other leagues whenever possible.

The League itself was strictly neutral in regard to suffrage tactics meaning the organisation did not either publicly endorse or condemn militancy. However, there were some members who were also a part of militant societies such the Women's Freedom League (WFL) or the Women’s Social and Political Union (WSPU), and who were arrested and imprisoned for militant actions. By 1913 the AFL membership had reached 900 members, and there was an affiliated men's group as well as over 100 patrons. The AFL adopted pink and green as its colours.

The first meeting of the AFL was held on 26 November 1908. and chaired by the actor–manager Johnston Forbes-Robertson. The first president of the league was Dame Madge Kendal.

== Activities ==
The AFL had very specific means of accomplishing their goals. These were delineated in its first annual report as:

i) Propaganda Meetings,

ii) Sale of Literature,

iii) Propaganda Plays,

iv) Lectures.

Literature, including plays and sketches by pro-suffrage writers, was sold at all AFL events. The AFL often collaborated with other suffrage groups, particularly the Women Writers' Suffrage League (WWSL). Writers and dramatists in this group, like Cicely Hamilton, provided many of the plays and skits performed by the AFL. The two groups shared many of the same members. The AFL performed at WSPU’s Women’s Suffrage Exhibition in 1909 and then at WSPU’s Christmas Fair and Festival in 1911.

The AFL set up offices at 2 Robert Street, Adelphi, near Charing Cross Station, and had branches across Britain in Edinburgh, Glasgow, Liverpool, and Eastbourne. Representative of the AFL were present at all major events in the British suffrage campaign between 1909 and 1928. Between 1909 and 1914, at least 120 suffrage plays were performed across the country.

The AFL was active for over 50 years, well after the partial granting of women's suffrage in 1918 and of equal suffrage in 1928. Early in World War !!, the AFL began war work, holding events to support theatrical charities and formed the Women’s Adjustment Board, to help find employment for women during wartime. Representatives of the AFL and WAB sat on the advisory council of the Equal Pay Campaign Committee in the 1940s and 1950s and other members worked to raise funds for residential homes for both elderly women and men. The last event held by AFL was a ball at the Savoy Hotel in December 1958 to commemorate its fiftieth anniversary.

== Membership and support ==
By 1914 membership of the AFL numbered over 900 and a linked men’s group had been formed. The AFL recruited over 100 patrons from outside the theatre professions, including Christabel Pankhurst.

=== Notable Members ===
- Lena Ashwell
- Edy Craig
- Cicely Hamilton
- Lillie Langtry
- Kitty Marion
- Elizabeth Robins
- Athene Seyler
- Sybil Thorndike

== Legacy ==
The organisation remained in existence until 1958.

Papers of the Actresses' Franchise League are held in the Women's Library in London at LSE. The Museum of London has a large banner of the AFL in its collection. Many of the plays created for the AFL to perform have been reprinted since the 1980s, most recently by Dr Naomi Paxton in two anthologies with Methuen Drama in 2013 and 2018

Between 1974 and 1981 the historian, Brian Harrison conducted a series of oral history interviews with surviving suffrage campaigners, their relatives and employees, known as The Suffrage Interviews, or Oral evidence on the suffragette and suffragist movements: the Brian Harrison interviews. 2 interviews with Letitia Fairfield, and 1 with Sybil Thorndike mention the Actresses' Franchise League.

From October 2018 to January 2019 there was an exhibition at the National Theatre in London about the Actresses' Franchise League and Women Writers' Suffrage League. It was called "Dramatic Progress: Votes for Women and the Edwardian Stage" and curated by Naomi Paxton.

== See also ==
- Theatre of the United Kingdom
- List of British suffragists and suffragettes
- Women's suffrage in the United Kingdom
- Suffrage drama
