= Henry Nevinson =

British journalist (1856–1941)

Henry Woodd Nevinson
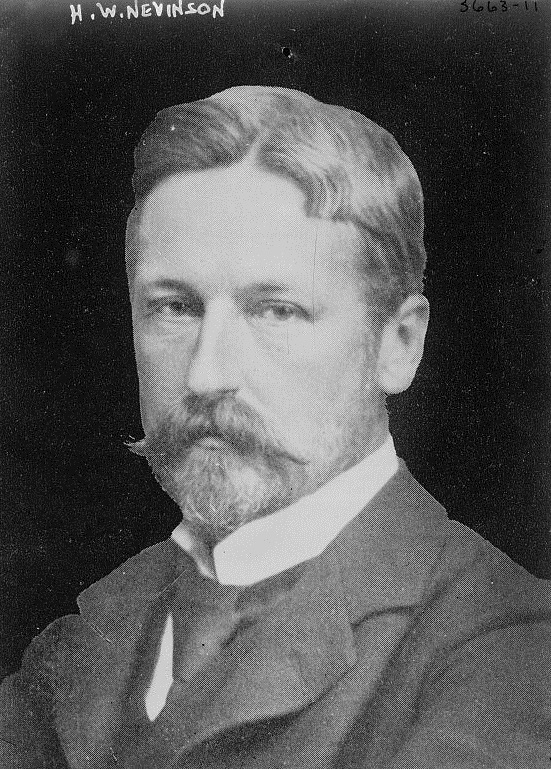
- Nevinson, circa 1915
- Born: 11 October 1856; Leicester, England
- Died: 9 November 1941 (aged 85); England
- Education: Shrewsbury School, Christ Church, Oxford
- Occupations: War correspondent; journalist; writer
- Notable work: A Modern Slavery; The Dawn in Russia; The New Spirit in India
- Movement: Suffragist, socialism, anti-slavery activism
- Spouse(s): Margaret Wynne Jones (died 1933); Evelyn Sharp (m. 1933)
- Children: Christopher Nevinson

Henry Woodd Nevinson (11 October 1856 – 9 November 1941) was an English war correspondent during the Second Boer War and World War I, a campaigning journalist exposing slavery in western Africa, political commentator and suffragist.

He was born in 1856 in Leicester, the son of solicitor George Nevinson and his wife, Maria Jane, née Woodd. Nevinson studied at Shrewsbury School and later at Christ Church, Oxford. At Oxford, he came under the influence of John Ruskin's ideas. He worked as a missionary at Toynbee Hall in London's East End. After this he spent some time in Jena studying German culture. The result of this was in 1884 Nevinson published his first book, Herder and his Times, one of the first studies of Johann Gottfried Herder in English. In the 1880s Nevinson became a socialist; he befriended Peter Kropotkin and Edward Carpenter, and in 1889 joined the Social Democratic Federation.

== Reporting ==
In 1897 Nevinson became the Daily Chronicle's correspondent in the Greco-Turkish War. He was known for his reporting on the Second Boer War, and slavery in Angola in 1904–1905, and on India for the Manchester Guardian. In 1914 he co-founded the Friends' Ambulance Unit and later in World War I was a war correspondent, being wounded at Gallipoli.

== Advocacy ==
He was hired by Harper's Monthly Magazine to investigate rumours of a trade in slaves from Angola to the cocoa plantations of São Tomé. After a 450-mile journey inland, he uncovered a trail of people being handed over to settle debts or seized by Portuguese agents and taken in shackles to the coastal towns. Once there he was enraged to find that Portuguese officials "freed" them and changed their status to that of voluntary workers who agreed to go to São Tomé for five years. Despite ill health so severe that he feared he had been poisoned Nevinson followed the slaves' journey to São Tomé. He found conditions on the plantations so harsh that one in five workers died each year. His account was serialised in the magazine from August 1905 and published as A Modern Slavery by Harper and Bros in 1906.

He was also a suffragist, one of the founders in 1907 of the Men's League for Women's Suffrage, and was later a member and chairman of the militant Men's Political Union for Women's Enfranchisement.

Reviewing Nevinson's book, More Changes, More Chances (1925), E. M. Forster described the book as "exciting", and noting that Nevinson had joined the British Labour Party, stated: "He has brought to the soil of his adoption something that transcends party - generosity, recklessness, a belief in conscience joined to a mistrust of principles".

In Nancy Cunard's pamphlet Authors Take Sides on the Spanish War, Nevinson gave his support to the Spanish Republicans and stated "I detest the cruel systems of persecution and suppression now existing under Hitler in Germany, Mussolini in Italy and Stalin in Russia".

== Family ==
He married Margaret Wynne Jones; their son was the artist Christopher Nevinson. During their marriage he had a long-term affair with Nannie Dryhurst which ended in 1912. Shortly after the death of his wife, Margaret, in 1933, Henry married his long-time friend and lover, fellow suffragist, Evelyn Sharp. He died in 1941, aged 85.

== Bibliography ==
- A Sketch of Herder and his times (1884) (See Johann Gottfried Herder.)
- Life of Friedrich Schiller (1889) (See Friedrich Schiller.)
- Neighbours of Ours: A Novel (1895)
- In the Valley of Tophet: Tales (1896)
- Pictures of Classic Greek Landscape and Architecture by J. Fulleylove, R.I. With a text in the explanation by H. W. Nevinson. (1897)
- Scenes in the Thirty Days War between Greece and Turkey, 1897. (1898)
- Ladysmith. The Diary of a siege. (1900)
- The Plea of Pan: Essays (1901)
- Between the Acts: Autobiographical and other sketches. (1904)
- Sketches on the Old Road through France to Florence. By A. H. Hallam Murray, accompanied by H. W. Nevinson and Montgomery Carmichael. (Pt. 1 [France] by H. W. Nevinson. Pt. 2 [Italy] by M. Carmichael.) (1904)
- Books And Personalities (1905)
- Through the African Wilderness (1905)
- A Modern Slavery (In Angola, San Thomé, and Principe), (1906)
- The Dawn in Russia or Scenes in the Russian Revolution, (1906)
- The New Spirit In India, (1908)
- Essays In Freedom (1909)
- The Fire of Prometheus (with Thomas Bird Mosher) (1909)
- Women's Vote And Men (with Louise Norlund) (1910?)
- Peace and war in the balance, delivered at South Place Institute on Dr Conway's birthday, 17 March 1911 (1911)
- The Growth Of Freedom (1912)
- Essays In Rebellion, (1913)
- Sir Roger Casement and Sinn Fein: some personal notes (1916)
- The Dardanelles campaign (1918)
- War And The Creative Impulse (with Max Plowman) (1919)
- Lines Of Life (1920)
- Original Sinners (1920)
- Farewell To America (Chapbook, 1922)
- Changes and Chances. (With plates). (1923) (Memoirs vol. 1)
- James Connolly: his life, work and writings (with Desmond Ryan) (1924)
- Our sportive butchers: an animals welfare week address (Chapbook, 1925)
- More Changes, More Chances (1925) (Memoirs vol. 2)
- Henry W. Nevinson (Poetry chapbook, 1925)
- Last Changes, last chances (1928) (Memoirs vol. 3)
- England's voice of freedom: an anthology of liberty (vt. The voice of freedom; an anthology of liberty) (as Editor) (1929)
- The English (1929)
- Rough Islanders; or The Natives of England (vt. The Natives of England) (with C. R. W. Nevinson) (1930)
- John Masefield (1931)
- Goethe: Man And Poet (1932)
- Ourselves; an essay introductory to twelve talks (Chapbook, 1933)
- Where East is West: Life in Bulgaria (with Henrietta Leslie) 1933
- In the Dark Backward (1934)
- Fire of Life (1935) (abridged single-volume edition of his memoirs)
- Between the Wars (1935)
- Running Accompaniments: Autobiographical reminiscences (1936)
- Hitler The Man (Chapbook, 1936)
- Films of Time (1939)
- Selected Poems (1940?)
- Thomas Hardy (1941)
- A group of unpublished letters by Henry S. Salt to Joseph Ishill (Editor, 1942)
- Words and Deeds: Essays (1942)
- Visions and Memories Edited by Evelyn Sharp. With an introduction by Gilbert Murray (1944)
- Essays, Poems and Tales (edited by H. N. Brailsford) (1948)

== See also ==
- Slavery in Angola
- Gallipoli (miniseries), in which he appears as a minor character
