= 1911 United Kingdom census =

Census of the population of the United Kingdom

Census 1911
- 2 April 1911

General information
- Country: United Kingdom

The United Kingdom Census 1911 of 2 April 1911 was the 12th nationwide census conducted in the United Kingdom of Great Britain and Ireland. The total population of the United Kingdom was approximately 45,221,000, with 36,070,000 recorded in England and Wales, 4,761,000 in Scotland, and 4,390,000 in Ireland.

== Geographical scope ==
The census covered England, Wales, Scotland, the Channel Islands, and ships of the Royal Navy at sea and in ports abroad.

The Census of Ireland, 1911 was carried out on the same day but the records are held separately by the National Archives of Ireland.

== Questions ==
The 1911 census was the first to ask about nationality, the duration of current marriage, number of children born within that marriage, number of living children and the number of any children who had died. It was the first to record full details of British Army personnel stationed overseas instead of requiring just a simple headcount. It was also the first census where the forms were completed by the respondents and retained rather than being copied into the enumeration books.

The census forms (schedules) contained an address and schedule number and were divided into sixteen columns:

- Name and Surname.
- Relationship to Head of Family.
- Age (Males).
- Age (Females).
- Marital condition.
- Number of years married (present marriage) - Married women only.
- Children born to present marriage.
- Children still living.
- Children who have died.
- Occupation.
- Industry or service with which worker is connected.
- Employment status.
- Whether working at home.
- Birthplace.
- Nationality - if born in a Foreign Country.
- Infirmity.
- Language spoken. (On the Welsh census)

Schedules were also prepared for:

- Institutions (workhouses, hospitals, hotels, schools, etc.).
- Shipping (merchant vessels).
- Military establishments (barracks, training schools, British Army overseas, etc.).
- Royal Naval vessels (in home ports).

== Suffragette boycott ==
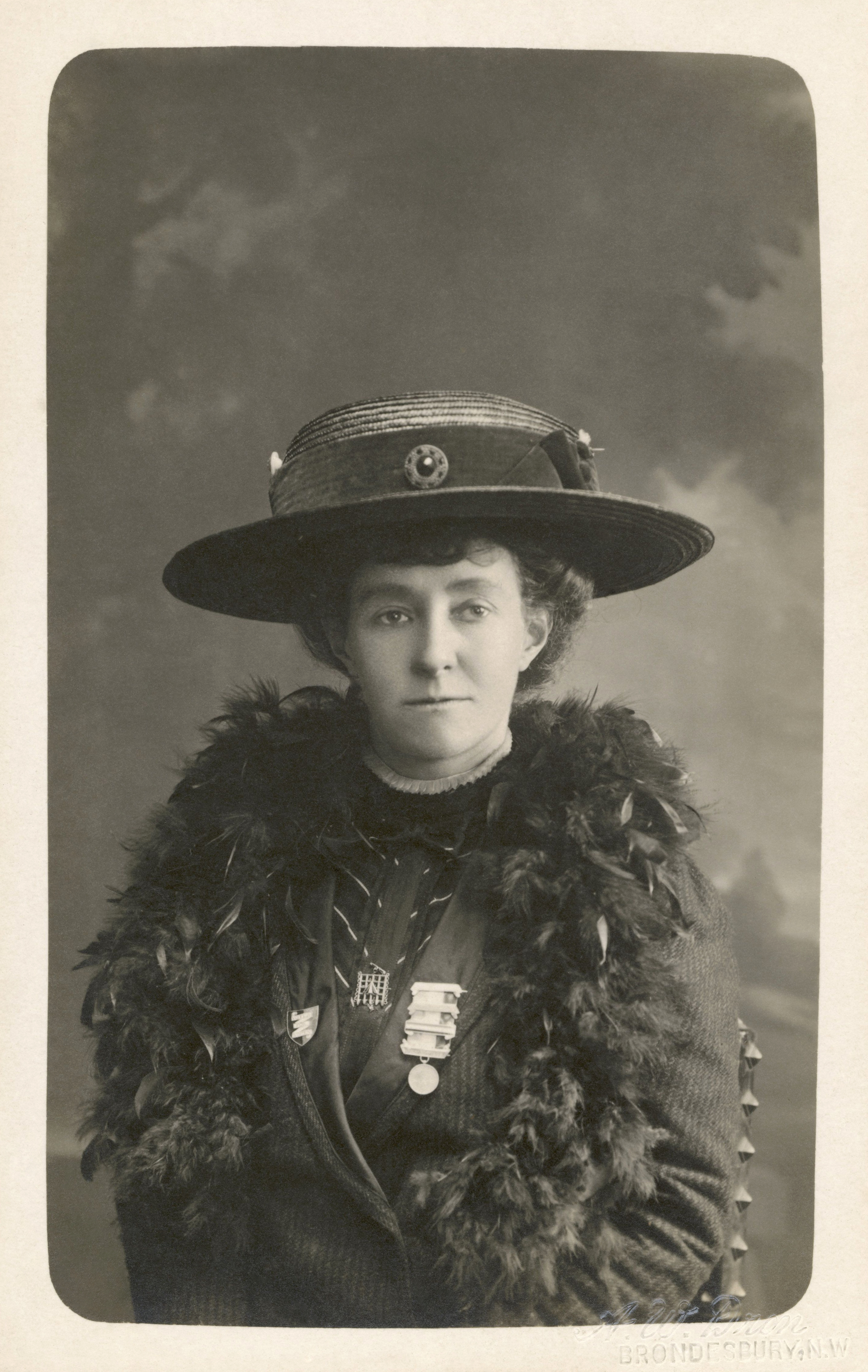
Emily Davison hid in the House of Commons to be enumerated in Parliament.

This census was subject to protests by women seeking the right to vote in the UK. Several suffragette organisations urged women and supporters of women's enfranchisement to boycott the census. The movement was also advertised by suffragist and writer Laurence Housman through a series of articles published in The Vote, in which he argued for the reasoning and tactical benefits of the proposal. He also wrote fiction supporting the movement, setting this series in a potential future where the boycott went well.

Some suffragettes like Joan Cather refused to fill in the forms, which were returned with sloganned stickers, such as "Votes for Women" or other slogans on their census returns. Her husband supported her position as he annotated the Census form that he had 'conscientious scruples' as head of household to note any 'female occupants' to avoid the census statistics being used by legislators for 'further vexatious legislation' against women 'in which they have no voice'. He went on to say he would provide the information if the Conciliation Committee Bill passed into law. The Registrar did however note two females as 'the probable number'. The National Archives documents Sophia Duleep Singh's refusal to take part in the census. The site describes Singh's tactics as "bold" and "innovative", reproduces her actual census form and her response "scrawled" on it "‘No vote, no census, as women do not count, they refuse to be counted.’"

Other suffragettes evaded the census by hiding overnight so that they could not be counted. In places throughout the UK, activists organised rallies or threw parties for suffragettes away from home, some for recreation, others for making political statements. Dorothy Evans organised parties for census boycotters in Birmingham, while Annie Kenney organised the census boycott in Bristol, and Lillian Dove-Willcox organised the boycott in Trowbridge. Margaret Nevinson was at home in Downside Crescent in London, harbouring an undetermined number of women who did not wish to be included in the census; an official copy of the census schedule survives, with a note on the refusals and their reason. Her husband and fellow suffragist Henry, deliberately absent from home, went skating, dining with Evelyn Sharp and other census resisters. Most famously, Emily Davison hid herself in a cupboard in the House of Commons at the Palace of Westminster overnight, becoming, when found, listed on the form as an occupant of the building. She could thus be enumerated in Parliament.

The impact of the census boycott is unclear. Margaret Nevinson wrote in the Suffrage Annual that some thousands of women did not appear in the census for that reason. The estimate by Agnes Metcalfe that the figure was at least 100,000 is doubted.

== Online access ==
The census data was published online on a subscription basis in 2009.

== See also ==
- Census in the United Kingdom
- List of United Kingdom censuses

Preceded by 1901	UK census 1911	Succeeded by 1921
