= Sime Seruya =

Portuguese actress, suffragist and socialist (1876–1955)

- Born: 1876; Lisbon, Portugal
- Died: 1955 (aged 78–79)
- Organization(s): Women's Social and Political Union, Women's Freedom League, Women's Tax Resistance League, Actresses' Franchise League, Fabian Society
- Political party: Independent Labour Party

Sime Seruya (1876–1955) was a Portuguese actress, suffragist and socialist who campaigned in Britain. She was a member of the Women's Social and Political Union (WSPU), the Women's Freedom League (WFL), Women's Tax Resistance League (WTRL) and was a co-founder of the Actresses' Franchise League (AFL).

== Biography ==
Seruya was born in Lisbon, Portugal in 1876. She worked as an actress in Portugal before arriving in London in 1906. She lived in West Lewisham.

Seruya joined the Women's Social and Political Union (WSPU) in 1907 and donated £100 to the cause. Also in 1907, she was arrested and sentenced to 14 days in prison for taking part in a women's suffrage deputation outside the House of Commons. By Autumn, she was among the seventy members of the WSPU who left to form the Women's Freedom League (WFL). In 1909, she also joined the Women's Tax Resistance League (WTRL).

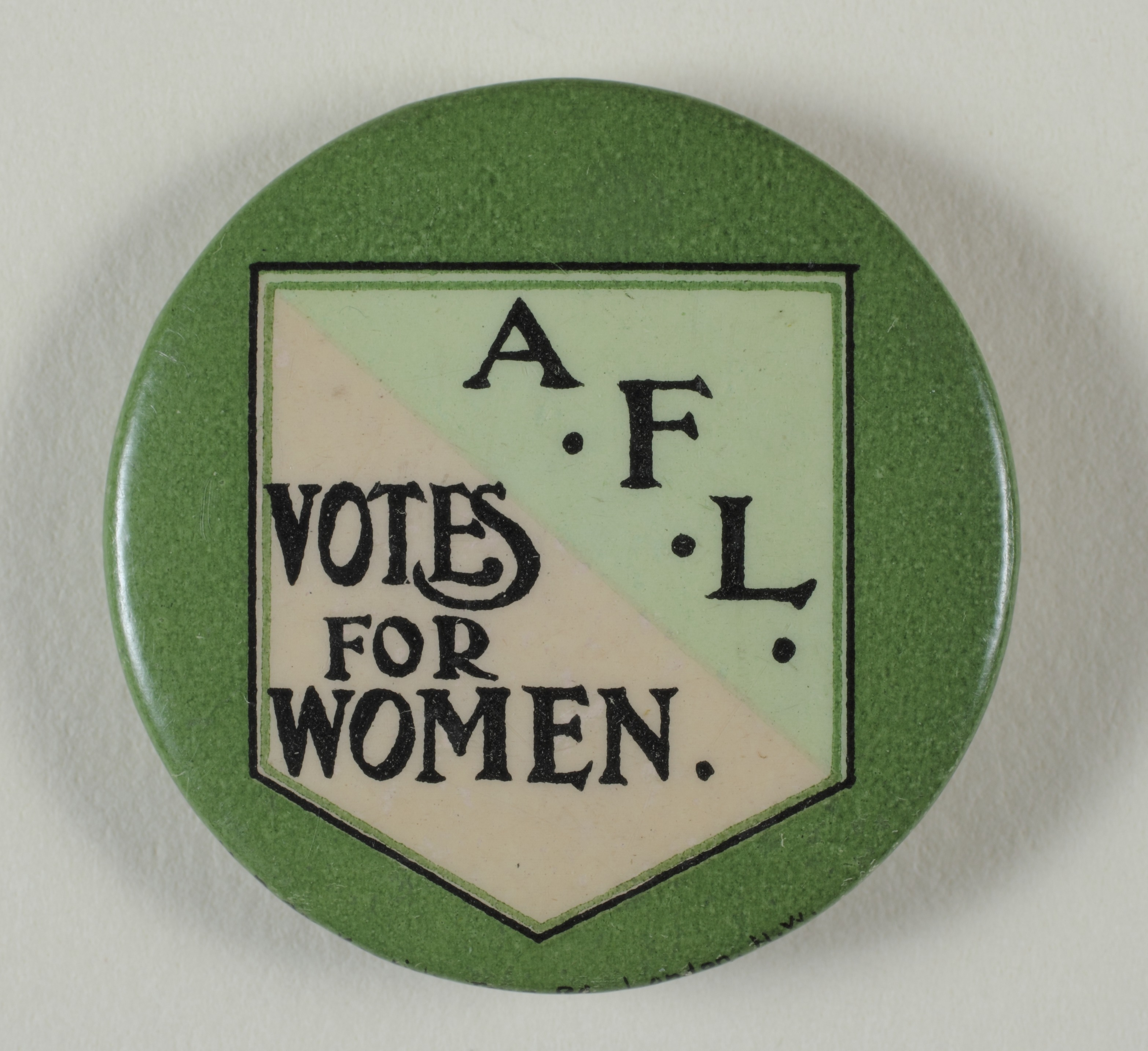
Actresses Franchise League Badge

In 1908, Seruya founded the Actresses' Franchise League (AFL), with Gertrude Elliott, Winifred Mayo and Adeline Bourne. The League represented actresses of both militant and non-militant suffrage tendencies. Seruya organised the WFL contribution to A Pageant of Great Women in 1910 with fellow actress Edith Craig.

In 1910, Seruya began selling feminist books and suffrage collectables (including postcards that she had published) out of one of Edith Craig and her partner Christabel Marshall's rooms at 31 Bedford Street, London, founding the "International Suffrage Shop." She published an advertisement in the Votes for Women newspaper about the opening of the shop. In March 1911 the shop moved to larger premises on Adam Street in the Strand. That year, Seruya also fought successfully against a conviction for selling Votes for Women on the steps of the Lyceum Theatre.

Seruya was also a socialist and a member of the Independent Labour Party and the Fabian Society. In 1908, she was the honorary treasurer of the Penal Reform League and in 1910 she attended the 8th International Socialist Congress in Copenhagen, Denmark.

In the interwar period, she was a member of the Film and Photo League and was involved in the workers film movement with other left wing activists such as Ivor Montagu, Eva Reckitt, Ernie Trory and others. She was also active in the Women's Committee for the Relief of the Miners' Wives and Children, after the 1926 United Kingdom general strike and subsequent miners' lockout.

She had a son, Ivan Seruya, who was a member of the Friends of the Soviet Union and the Young Communist League as a student at Regent Street Polytechnic. She died in 1955.
