= Census Enumerators' Books =

During the decennial England and Wales censuses of 1841 to 1901, the individual schedules returned from each household were transcribed and collated by the census enumerators into Census Enumerators' Books (CEBs).

It is these CEBs that are used by researchers in the fields of social science, local and family history etc.

Their contents changed over time.

== Area descriptions at the head of each page ==
- 1841
  - City or Borough of
  - Parish or Township of
- 1851
  - Parish or Township of
  - Ecclesiastical District of
  - City or Borough of
  - Town of
  - Village of
- 1861
  - Parish or Township of
  - City or Municipal Borough of
  - Municipal Ward of
  - Parliamentary Borough of
  - Town of
  - Hamlet or Tithing of
  - Ecclesiastical District of
- 1871
  - Civil Parish (or Township) of
  - City or Municipal Borough of
  - Municipal Ward of
  - Parliamentary Borough of
  - Town of
  - Village or Hamlet of
  - Local Board (or Improvement Commissioner's District) of
- 1881
  - Civil Parish (or Township) of
  - City or Municipal Borough of
  - Municipal Ward of
  - Parliamentary Borough of
  - Town or Village or Hamlet of
  - Urban Sanitary District of
  - Rural Sanitary District of
  - Ecclesiastical Parish or District of
- 1891
  - Administrative County of
  - Civil Parish of
  - Municipal Borough of
  - Municipal Ward of
  - Urban Sanitary District of
  - Town or Village or Hamlet of
  - Rural Sanitary District of
  - Parliamentary Borough or Division of
  - Ecclesiastical Parish or District of

== Structure of CEB ==
- Number of Householder's Schedule
  - In 1841, if present at all, this was written in the margin
- Place (1841) otherwise Name of Street, Place or Road, and Name or No. of House
  - From 1851 to 1901 this column's description varied somewhat
- Houses Inhabited, Uninhabited or Building
  - Not in 1851
- Number of Rooms Occupied if less than 5
  - 1891 only
- Name and Surname of each Person who abode in the house on the night of ⟨date⟩
  - Similar wording throughout
- Relation to Head of Family
  - Not in 1841
- Condition – i.e. Single, Married, Widowed etc.
  - Not in 1841
- Age and Sex
  - In 1841 ages of adults were normally rounded down to the next lowest 5 e.g. 21 => 20, 29 => 25
- Occupation
  - Wording changed over time
- Employed, Employer, or Own Account
  - In 1891 and 1901 (different wording in 1891)
- Where born
  - In 1841 whether born in the county, Scotland, Ireland, or Foreign Parts
- Whether deaf-and-dumb, blind, imbecile, idiot, or lunatic
  - Not in 1841
- Language spoken
  - Wales only, from 1891. With "children under 3 years of age to be excluded" in parentheses in 1901

== Examples ==
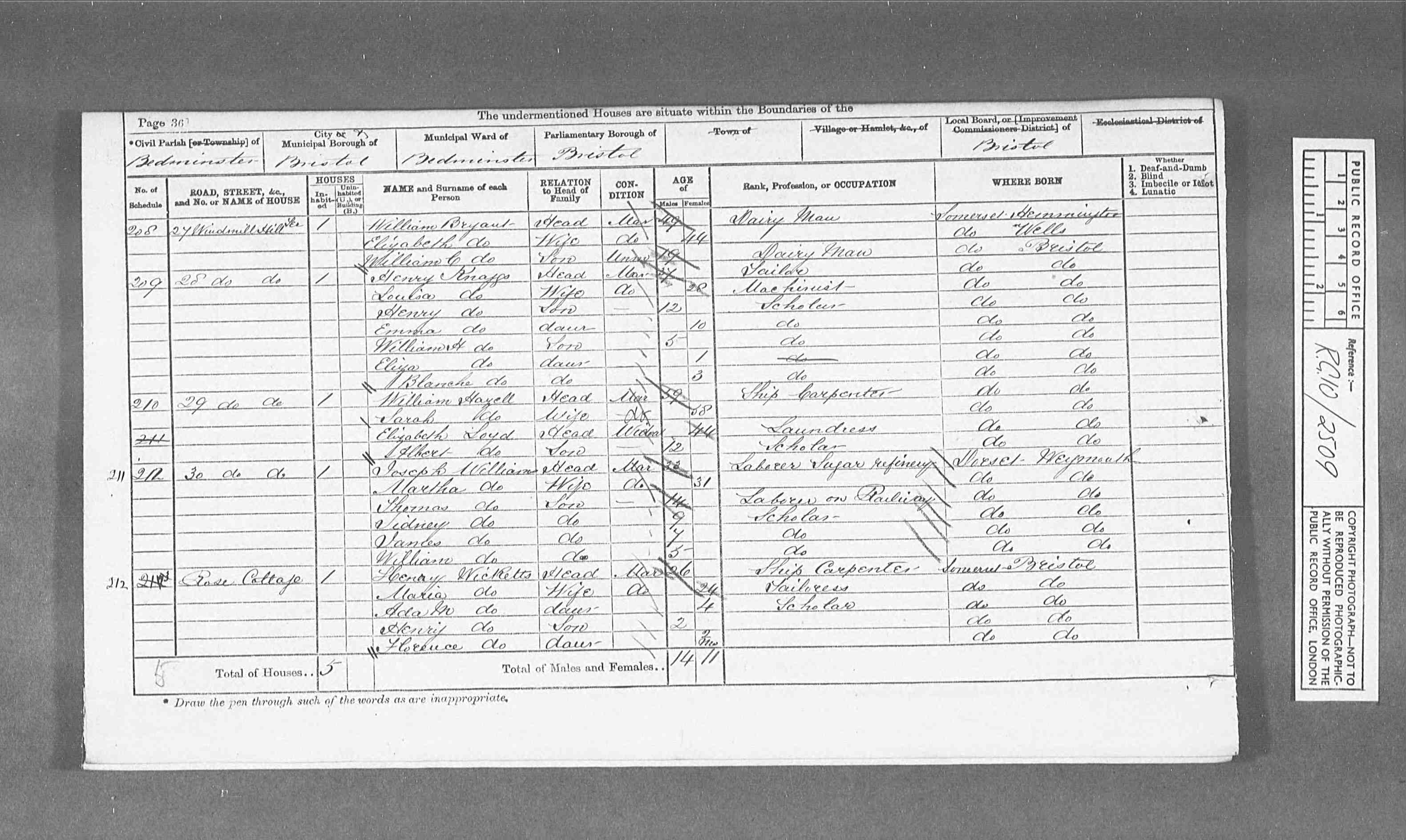
Example of 1871 Census in England and Wales

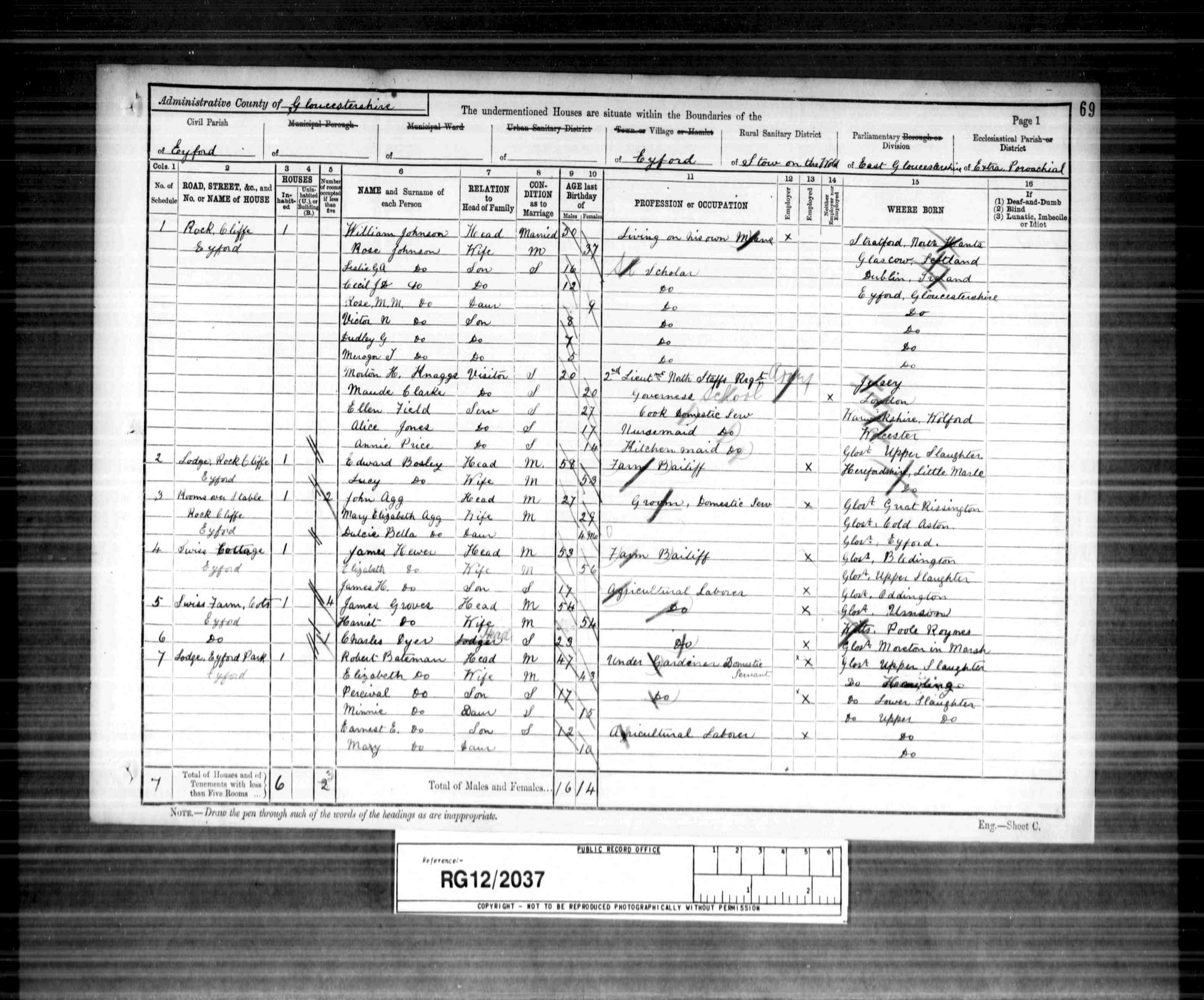
Example of 1891 Census in England and Wales
