= Agnes Metcalfe =

British teacher, author and active suffragist

Agnes Edith Metcalfe
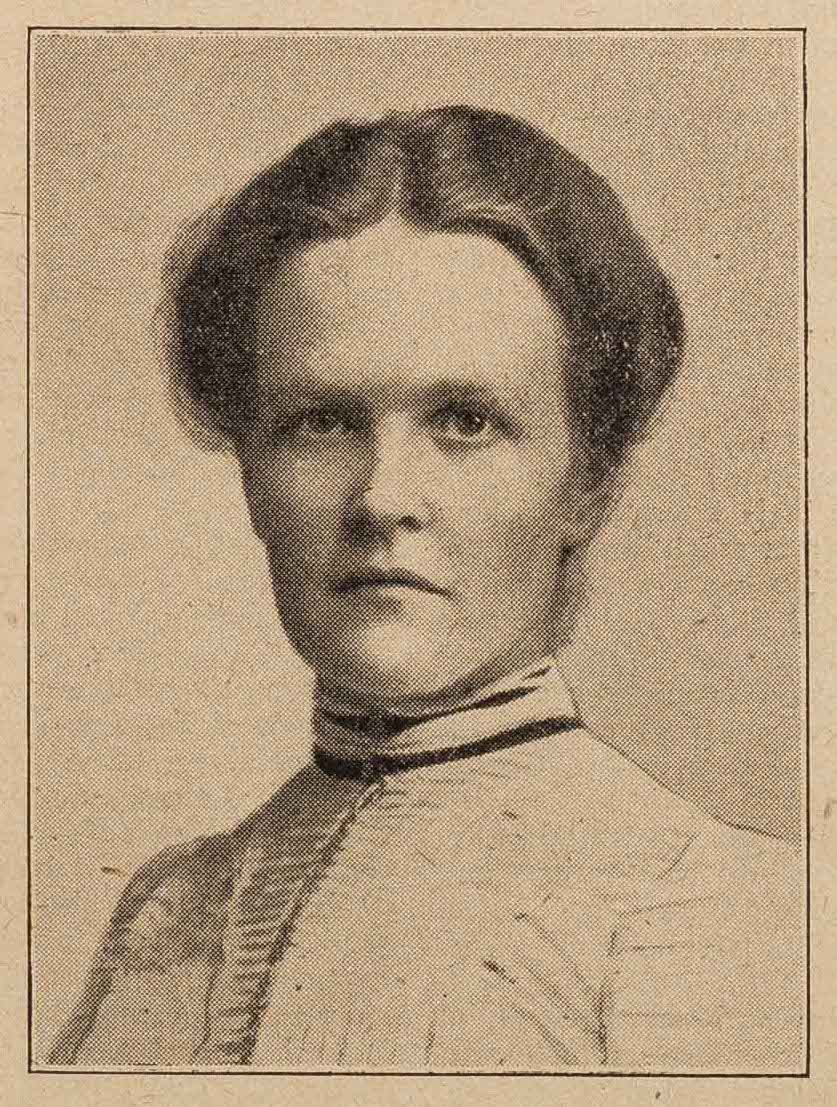
- Born: 2 March 1870; Wisbech, Cambridgeshire
- Died: 6 October 1923 (aged 53); Combe Down, Bath, Somerset
- Occupations: Teacher, headteacher, suffragist, writer
- Organization: Women's Tax Resistance League

Agnes Edith Metcalfe (2 March 1870 – 6 October 1923) was a British headteacher, author, and active suffragist. In 1905, she was appointed headteacher at one of the first four county council secondary schools at Sydenham.

== Early life and career ==
Agnes Edith Metcalfe was born in Wisbech, Cambridgeshire in 1870, the daughter of Frank Metcalfe and Judith Hopkinson. Through her father, Agnes was a great-great-niece of William Skrimshire and Fenwick Skrimshire. She was also a distant relative of John Francis Metcalfe and Nicholas Copeman. She was educated at Cheltenham Ladies’ College, obtaining a Bachelor of Science degree in 1892 as an external student of the University of London.

Metcalfe became a teacher at Cheltenham, and grew increasingly interested in the higher education of women. She prepared a paper on the secondary education of girls in France, published by the Board of Education. In 1897, she became headteacher of Stroud Green School in North London.

In 1905, she was appointed the first headteacher of one of the first four County Council Secondary Schools, Sydenham County Council School. Metcalfe remained there for just over two years, until her appointment in December 1907 as an Inspector of the Board of Education. By 1913, she was described as an "ex. H.M.I."

== Suffrage ==
Metcalfe was involved with the Women's Tax Resistance League, at one point acting as treasurer. The League protested against the requirement for women to pay taxes while they remained ineligible to vote. In 1913, she appeared at Greenwich Court on Tuesday, charged with non-payment of a dog license. Suffrage newspaper The Vote reported that:

In a short speech she said that she refused on conscientious grounds to pay taxes while women had no vote. The magistrate congratulated Miss Metcalfe on the clearness and eloquence with which she made out her case. He regretted that the law must take its course, and imposed a fine of 7s. with 2s. costs, recoverable by distraint. The alternative was one day’s imprisonment.

Metcalfe also wrote three books on women's struggle for the vote: Woman’s Effort: A Chronicle of British Women’s Fifty Years’ Struggle for Citizenship (1865-1914), with an introduction by Laurence Housman (1917); Woman, A Citizen (1918); and 'At Last’: Conclusion of Women’s Effort (1919). Woman's Effort was said to have been a persuasive and well-written work, which won many new sympathisers for the suffrage cause.

== Works ==
- Women’s Effort: A Chronicle of British Women’s Fifty Years’ Struggle for Citizenship (1865-1914), 1917.
- Woman, A Citizen, 1918
- 'At Last': Conclusion of Women's Effort, 1919

== Death and legacy ==
Agnes Edith Metcalfe died on 6 November 1923 in Combe Down, Bath, England. On her death, The Vote ran Metcalfe's obituary on its front page, under the title: Educational Pioneer, Author, and Suffragette'. Money left by Metcalfe was used to establish the Metcalfe Studentships for Women at the London School of Economics, awarded to female postgraduate students researching social, economic, or industrial issues.
