= List of acts of the Parliament of the United Kingdom from 1896 =

This is a complete list of acts of the Parliament of the United Kingdom for the year 1896.

Note that the first parliament of the United Kingdom was held in 1801; parliaments between 1707 and 1800 were either parliaments of Great Britain or of Ireland). For acts passed up until 1707, see the list of acts of the Parliament of England and the list of acts of the Parliament of Scotland. For acts passed from 1707 to 1800, see the list of acts of the Parliament of Great Britain. See also the list of acts of the Parliament of Ireland.

For acts of the devolved parliaments and assemblies in the United Kingdom, see the list of acts of the Scottish Parliament, the list of acts of the Northern Ireland Assembly, and the list of acts and measures of Senedd Cymru; see also the list of acts of the Parliament of Northern Ireland.

The number shown after each act's title is its chapter number. Acts passed before 1963 are cited using this number, preceded by the year(s) of the reign during which the relevant parliamentary session was held; thus the Union with Ireland Act 1800 is cited as "39 & 40 Geo. 3 c. 67", meaning the 67th act passed during the session that started in the 39th year of the reign of George III and which finished in the 40th year of that reign. Note that the modern convention is to use Arabic numerals in citations (thus "41 Geo. 3" rather than "41 Geo. III"). Acts of the last session of the Parliament of Great Britain and the first session of the Parliament of the United Kingdom are both cited as "41 Geo. 3". Acts passed from 1963 onwards are simply cited by calendar year and chapter number.

All modern acts have a short title, e.g. the Local Government Act 2003. Some earlier acts also have a short title given to them by later acts, such as by the Short Titles Act 1896.

== 59 & 60 Vict. ==
The second session of the 26th Parliament of the United Kingdom, which met from 11 February 1896 until 14 August 1896.

=== Public general acts ===
Short title	Citation	Royal assent
Long title
Local Government (Elections) Act 1896 (repealed)	59 & 60 Vict. c. 1	6 March 1896
An Act to continue temporarily certain Powers for the Removal of Difficulties at Elections under the Local Government Act, 1894. (Note: Local Government Act 1894 (56 & 57 Vict. c. 73)) (Repealed for England and Wales by Local Government Act 1933 (23 & 24 Geo. 5. c. 51) and for Northern Ireland by Statute Law Revision Act (Northern Ireland) 1954 (c. 35 (N.I.)))
Army (Annual) Act 1896 (repealed)	59 & 60 Vict. c. 2	27 March 1896
An Act to provide, during Twelve Months, for the Discipline and Regulation of the Army. (Repealed by Statute Law Revision Act 1908 (8 Edw. 7. c. 49) and Statute Law Revision Act 1950 (14 Geo. 6. c. 6))
Consolidated Fund (No. 1) Act 1896 (repealed)	59 & 60 Vict. c. 3	27 March 1896
An Act to apply certain sums out of the Consolidated Fund to the service of the years ending on the thirty-first day of March one thousand eight hundred and ninety-six and one thousand eight hundred and ninety-seven. (Repealed by Statute Law Revision Act 1908 (8 Edw. 7. c. 49))
Local Government (Elections) (No. 2) Act 1896 (repealed)	59 & 60 Vict. c. 4	27 March 1896
An Act to prevent certain Disqualifications for Elections to Parish Councils of 1896. (Repealed by Statute Law Revision Act 1908 (8 Edw. 7. c. 49))
Poor Law Guardians (Ireland) (Women) Act 1896 (repealed)	59 & 60 Vict. c. 5	31 March 1896
An Act to enable Women to be elected and act as Poor Law Guardians in Ireland. (Repealed by Statute Law Revision Act (Northern Ireland) 1954 (c. 35 (N.I.)))
Naval Works Act 1896 (repealed)	59 & 60 Vict. c. 6	31 March 1896
An Act to make provision for the Construction of Works in the United Kingdom and elsewhere for the purpose of the Royal Navy. (Repealed by Statute Law Revision Act 1950 (14 Geo. 6. c. 6))
Consolidated Fund (No. 2) Act 1896 (repealed)	59 & 60 Vict. c. 7	21 May 1896
An Act to apply a sum out of the Consolidated Fund to the service of the year ending on the thirty-first day of March one thousand eight hundred and ninety-seven. (Repealed by Statute Law Revision Act 1908 (8 Edw. 7. c. 49))
Life Assurance Companies (Payment into Court) Act 1896	59 & 60 Vict. c. 8	21 May 1896
An Act to enable Life Assurance Companies to pay Money into Court in certain Cases.
Local Government (Determination of Differences) Act 1896 (repealed)	59 & 60 Vict. c. 9	21 May 1896
An Act to amend certain Provisions of the Local Government Act, 1888, (Note: Local Government Act 1888 (51 & 52 Vict. c. 41)) with respect to the Determination of Differences by the Local Government Board. (Repealed by Statute Law (Repeals) Act 1975 (c. 10))
Dispensary Committees (Ireland) Act 1896 (repealed)	59 & 60 Vict. c. 10	2 July 1896
An Act to amend the Law relating to the Appointment of Members of Dispensary Committees in Ireland. (Repealed by Statute Law Revision Act 1908 (8 Edw. 7. c. 49))
Housing of the Working Classes (Ireland) Act 1896 (repealed)	59 & 60 Vict. c. 11	2 July 1896
An Act to remove certain Doubts with respect to the Housing of the Working Classes Act, 1890, (Note: Housing of the Working Classes Act 1890 (53 & 54 Vict. c. 70)) so far as it applies to Ireland. (Repealed by Housing Act (Northern Ireland) 1945 (c. 2 (N.I.)) and Statute Law Revision Act (Northern Ireland) 1954 (c. 35 (N.I.)))
Derelict Vessels (Report) Act 1896 (repealed)	59 & 60 Vict. c. 12	2 July 1896
An Act for the better reporting of Floating Derelicts. (Repealed by Merchant Shipping (Safety and Load Line Conventions) Act 1932 (22 & 23 Geo. 5. c. 9))
Incumbents of Benefices Loans Extension Act 1896 (repealed)	59 & 60 Vict. c. 13	20 July 1896
An Act to extend the Time for the Repayment of Loans granted by Queen Anne's Bounty to Incumbents of Benefices. (Repealed by Statute Law Revision Act 1908 (8 Edw. 7. c. 49))
Short Titles Act 1896	59 & 60 Vict. c. 14	20 July 1896
An Act to facilitate the Citation of sundry Acts of Parliament.
Diseases of Animals Act 1896 (repealed)	59 & 60 Vict. c. 15	20 July 1896
An Act to Amend the Diseases of Animals Act, 1894. (Note: Diseases of Animals Act 1894 (57 & 58 Vict. c. 57)) (Repealed for England and Wales and Scotland by Diseases of Animals Act 1950 (14 Geo. 6. c. 36) and for Northern Ireland by Diseases of Animals Act (Northern Ireland) 1958 (c. 13 (N.I.)))
Agricultural Rates Act 1896 (repealed)	59 & 60 Vict. c. 16	20 July 1896
An Act to amend the Law with respect to the Rating of Occupiers of Agricultural Land in England, and for other purposes connected therewith. (Repealed by Local Government Act 1929 (19 & 20 Geo. 5. c. 17))
Glasgow Parliamentary Divisions Act 1896 (repealed)	59 & 60 Vict. c. 17	20 July 1896
An Act to redescribe the Parliamentary Divisions of the City of Glasgow. (Repealed by Representation of the People Act 1918 (7 & 8 Geo. 5. c. 64))
Fisheries (Norfolk and Suffolk) Act 1896 (repealed)	59 & 60 Vict. c. 18	20 July 1896
An Act to amend the Fisheries Acts relating to Norfolk and Suffolk. (Repealed by Salmon and Freshwater Fisheries Act 1923 (13 & 14 Geo. 5. c. 16))
Public Health Act 1896 (repealed)	59 & 60 Vict. c. 19	7 August 1896
An Act to make further Provision with respect to Epidemic, Endemic, and Infectious Diseases, and to repeal the Acts relating to Quarantine. (Repealed for Scotland by Public Health (Scotland) Act 1897 (60 & 61 Vict. c. 38), for England and Wales by Public Health Act 1936 (26 Geo. 5 & 1 Edw. 8. c. 49) and for Northern Ireland by Statute Law (Repeals) Act 1969 (c. 52))
Public Health (Ports) Act 1896 (repealed)	59 & 60 Vict. c. 20	7 August 1896
An Act to amend the Public Health Act with respect to the Powers of Port Sanitary Authorities. (Repealed by Public Health Act 1936 (26 Geo. 5 & 1 Edw. 8. c. 49))
Liverpool Court of Passage Act 1896 (repealed)	59 & 60 Vict. c. 21	7 August 1896
An Act to amend the Procedure of the Liverpool Court of Passage. (Repealed by Liverpool Corporation Act 1921 (11 & 12 Geo. 5. c. lxxiv))
Chairmen of District Councils Act 1896 (repealed)	59 & 60 Vict. c. 22	7 August 1896
An Act to exempt certain Chairmen of District Councils who have already taken the Oath from again taking the Oath before acting as Justices of the Peace. (Repealed by Local Government Act 1933 (23 & 24 Geo. 5. c. 51))
Public Offices (Westminster Site) Act 1896	59 & 60 Vict. c. 23	7 August 1896
An Act for the acquisition of a Site for Public Offices in Westminster, and for purposes connected therewith.
Edinburgh General Register House Act 1896	59 & 60 Vict. c. 24	7 August 1896
An Act for the Acquisition of Property for the Extension of the General Register House at Edinburgh.
Friendly Societies Act 1896	59 & 60 Vict. c. 25	7 August 1896
An Act to consolidate the Law relating to Friendly and other Societies.
Collecting Societies and Industrial Assurance Companies Act 1896 (repealed)	59 & 60 Vict. c. 26	7 August 1896
An Act to consolidate the Enactments relating to Friendly Societies and Industrial Assurance Companies which receive Contributions and Premiums by means of Collectors. (Repealed by Industrial Assurance Act 1923 (13 & 14 Geo. 5. c. 8) and Industrial Assurance Act (Northern Ireland) 1924 (14 & 15 Geo. 5. c. 21 (N.I.)))
London Cab Act 1896	59 & 60 Vict. c. 27	7 August 1896
An Act to amend the Law relating to Cabs in London.
Finance Act 1896	59 & 60 Vict. c. 28	7 August 1896
An Act to grant certain Duties of Customs and Inland Revenue, to alter other Duties, to amend the Law relating to Customs and Inland Revenue, and to make provision for the Financial Arrangements of the Year,
Bishopric of Bristol Amendment Act 1896 (repealed)	59 & 60 Vict. c. 29	7 August 1896
An Act to amend the Bishopric of Bristol Act, 1884. (Note: Bishopric of Bristol Act 1884 (47 & 48 Vict. c. 66)) (Repealed by Statute Law (Repeals) Act 1973 (c. 39))
Conciliation Act 1896 or the Conciliation and Arbitration Act 1896 (repealed)	59 & 60 Vict. c. 30	7 August 1896
An Act to make better Provision for the Prevention and Settlement of Trade Disputes. (Repealed by Employment Protection Act 1975 (c. 71))
Housing of the Working Classes Act 1890 Amendment (Scotland) Act 1896 (repealed)	59 & 60 Vict. c. 31	7 August 1896
An Act to amend the Housing of the Working Classes Act, 1890. (Repealed by Statute Law (Repeals) Act 1971 (c. 52))
Orkney and Zetland Small Piers and Harbours Act 1896 (repealed)	59 & 60 Vict. c. 32	14 August 1896
An Act to facilitate the Construction of Small Piers and Harbours in the Counties of Orkney and Zetland. (Repealed by Local Government (Scotland) Act 1973 (c. 65))
Royal Naval Reserve Volunteer Act 1896 (repealed)	59 & 60 Vict. c. 33	14 August 1896
An Act to amend the Laws with respect to the Royal Naval Volunteers. (Repealed by Reserve Forces Act 1980 (c. 9))
Railways (Ireland) Act 1896 (repealed)	59 & 60 Vict. c. 34	14 August 1896
An Act to facilitate the Construction of Railways and the Establishment of other means of Communication in Ireland, and for other purposes incidental thereto. (Repealed by Public Works, etc., Loans Act (Northern Ireland) 1953 (c. 13 (N.I.)))
Judicial Trustees Act 1896	59 & 60 Vict. c. 35	14 August 1896
An Act to provide for the Appointment of Judicial Trustees and otherwise to amend the Law respecting the Administration of Trusts and the Liability of Trustees.
Locomotives on Highways Act 1896 (repealed)	59 & 60 Vict. c. 36	14 August 1896
An Act to amend the Law with respect to the Use of Locomotives on Highways. (Repealed for England and Wales and Scotland by Road Traffic Act 1930 (20 & 21 Geo. 5. c. 43) and for Northern Ireland by Road Traffic Act (Northern Ireland) 1955 (c. 27 (N.I.)))
Agricultural Rates, Congested Districts, and Burgh Land Tax Relief (Scotland) Act 1896 (repealed)	59 & 60 Vict. c. 37	14 August 1896
An Act to amend the Law with respect to the Classification of Lands and Heritages for purposes of Rating in Scotland, for the Relief of the Occupiers of Agricultural Lands and Heritages, for the creation of a Fund for the Improvement of Congested Districts in the Highlands and Islands, and for Relief from the Payment of the Land Tax in Burghs in Scotland. (Repealed by Local Government (Scotland) Act 1929 (19 & 20 Geo. 5. c. 25))
Uganda Railway Act 1896 (repealed)	59 & 60 Vict. c. 38	14 August 1896
An Act to make provision for the Construction of a Railway in Africa, from Mombasa to the Victoria Nyanza, through the Protectorates of Zanzibar, British East Africa, and Uganda. (Repealed by Statute Law Revision Act 1950 (14 Geo. 6. c. 6))
Expiring Laws Continuance Act 1896 (repealed)	59 & 60 Vict. c. 39	14 August 1896
An Act to continue various Expiring Laws. (Repealed by Statute Law Revision Act 1908 (8 Edw. 7. c. 49))
Telegraph (Money) Act 1896 (repealed)	59 & 60 Vict. c. 40	14 August 1896
An Act to provide for raising further Money for the purpose of the Telegraph Acts, 1863 to 1892. (Repealed by Statute Law Revision Act 1950 (14 Geo. 6. c. 6))
Local Taxation (Ireland) Estate Duty Act 1896 (repealed)	59 & 60 Vict. c. 41	14 August 1896
An Act for paying to the Local Taxation (Ireland) Account a Share of the Estate Duty. (Repealed by Local Government (Ireland) Act 1898 (61 & 62 Vict. c. 37) and Statute Law Revision Act 1908 (8 Edw. 7. c. 49))
Public Works Loans Act 1896 (repealed)	59 & 60 Vict. c. 42	14 August 1896
An Act to grant Moneys for the purpose of certain Local Loans, and for other purposes relating to Local Loans. (Repealed by National Loans Act 1968 (c. 13))
Coal Mines Regulation Act 1896 (repealed)	59 & 60 Vict. c. 43	14 August 1896
An Act to amend the Coal Mines Regulation Act, 1887. (Note: Coal Mines Regulation Act 1887 (50 & 51 Vict. c. 58)) (Repealed by Coal Mines Act 1911 (1 & 2 Geo. 5. c. 50))
Truck Act 1896 (repealed)	59 & 60 Vict. c. 44	14 August 1896
An Act to amend the Truck Acts. (Repealed by Wages Act 1986 (c. 48))
Stannaries Court (Abolition) Act 1896	59 & 60 Vict. c. 45	14 August 1896
An Act for abolishing the Court of the Vice-Warden of the Stannaries.
Appropriation Act 1896 (repealed)	59 & 60 Vict. c. 46	14 August 1896
An Act to apply a sum out of the Consolidated Fund to the service of the year ending on the thirty-first day of March one thousand eight hundred and ninety-seven, and to appropriate the Supplies granted in this Session of Parliament. (Repealed by Statute Law Revision Act 1908 (8 Edw. 7. c. 49))
Land Law (Ireland) Act 1896	59 & 60 Vict. c. 47	14 August 1896
An Act to further amend the Law relating to the Occupation and Ownership of Land in Ireland, and for other purposes relating thereto.
Light Railways Act 1896	59 & 60 Vict. c. 48	14 August 1896
An Act to facilitate the Construction of Light Railways in Great Britain. (Repealed for England and Wales by Transport and Works Act 1992 (1992 c. 42))
Law Agents (Scotland) Act Amendment Act 1896 (repealed)	59 & 60 Vict. c. 49	14 August 1896
An Act to amend the Law relating to Law Agents and Notaries Public practising in Scotland. (Repealed by Solicitors (Scotland) Act 1933 (23 & 24 Geo. 5. c. 21))
Poor Law Officers' Superannuation Act 1896 (repealed)	59 & 60 Vict. c. 50	14 August 1896
An Act to provide for Superannuation Allowances to Poor Law Officers and Servants, and for Contributions towards such Allowances by such Officers and Servants; and to make other relative provisions. (Repealed by Statute Law (Repeals) Act 1981 (c. 19))
Vexatious Actions Act 1896 (repealed)	59 & 60 Vict. c. 51	14 August 1896
An Act to prevent Abuse of the Process of the High Court or other Courts by the Institution of Vexatious Legal Proceedings. (Repealed by Supreme Court of Judicature (Consolidation) Act 1925 (15 & 16 Geo. 5. c. 49))
Larceny Act 1896 (repealed)	59 & 60 Vict. c. 52	14 August 1896
An Act to amend the Law with respect to the Jurisdiction exerciseable in Cases relating to the Receipt or Possession of Stolen Property. (Repealed by Larceny Act 1916 (6 & 7 Geo. 5. c. 50))
Labourers (Ireland) Act 1896 (repealed)	59 & 60 Vict. c. 53	14 August 1896
An Act to amend the Labourers (Ireland) Acts, 1883 to 1892. (Repealed by Labourers (Ireland) Act 1906 (6 Edw. 7. c. 37), Statute Law Revision Act 1908 (8 Edw. 7. c. 49) and Statute Law Revision Act (Northern Ireland) 1954 (c. 35 (N.I.)))
Public Health (Ireland) Act 1896	59 & 60 Vict. c. 54	14 August 1896
An Act to amend the Acts relating to Public Health in Ireland.
Quarter Sessions (London) Act 1896 (repealed)	59 & 60 Vict. c. 55	14 August 1896
An Act to make provisions relating to the offices of Chairman and Deputy Chairman of the Court of Quarter Sessions for the County of London. (Repealed by Administration of Justice Act 1964 (c. 42))
Wild Birds Protection Act 1896 (repealed)	59 & 60 Vict. c. 56	14 August 1896
An Act to amend the Wild Birds Protection Acts. (Repealed by Protection of Birds Act 1954 (2 & 3 Eliz. 2. c. 30))
Burglary Act 1896 (repealed)	59 & 60 Vict. c. 57	14 August 1896
An Act to provide for the Trial of Burglaries by Courts of Quarter Sessions. (Repealed by Larceny Act 1916 (6 & 7 Geo. 5. c. 50))
West Highland Railway Guarantee Act 1896 (repealed)	59 & 60 Vict. c. 58	14 August 1896
An Act for authorising the Treasury to guarantee the Interest on certain Capital of the West Highland Railway Company, and pay a Sum of Money to that Company. (Repealed by Statute Law Revision Act 1950 (14 Geo. 6. c. 6))
Baths and Washhouses Act 1896 (repealed)	59 & 60 Vict. c. 59	14 August 1896
An Act to amend the Baths and Washhouses Acts. (Repealed by Public Health (London) Act 1936 (26 Geo. 5 & 1 Edw. 8. c. 50) and City of London (Various Powers) Act 1960 (8 & 9 Eliz. 2. c. xxxvi))

=== Local acts ===
Short title	Citation	Royal assent
Long title
Metropolitan District Railway (Extension of Time) Act 1896	59 & 60 Vict. c. i	27 March 1896
An Act to extend the time for the completion of the Acton Junction Railway of the Metropolitan District Railway Company.
Education Department Provisional Order Confirmation (Tottenham) Act 1896	59 & 60 Vict. c. ii	31 March 1896
An Act to confirm a Provisional Order made by the Education Department under the Elementary Education Act 1870 (Note: Elementary Education Act 1870 (33 & 34 Vict. c. 75)) to enable the School Board for Tottenham to put in force the Lands Clauses Acts.
	Tottenham (Middlesex) School Board Order 1896 Provisional Order for putting in force the Lands Clauses Acts.	
Electric Lighting Orders Confirmation (Notting Hill, &c.) Act 1896	59 & 60 Vict. c. iii	31 March 1896
An Act to confirm certain Provisional Orders made by the Board of Trade under the Electric Lighting Acts 1882 (Note: Electric Lighting Act 1882 (45 & 46 Vict. c. 56)) and 1888 (Note: Electric Lighting Act 1888 (51 & 52 Vict. c. 12)) relating to a portion of the Parish of Kensington St. Mary Abbotts and to the St. Clave and Strand Districts in the County of London.
	Notting Hill Electric Lighting Order 1896 Provisional Order granted by the Board of Trade under the Electric Lighting Acts 1882 and 1888 to the Notting Hill Electric Lighting Company Limited in respect of a portion of the Parish of St. Mary Abbotts Kensington.	
	St. Olave Electric Lighting Order 1896 Provisional Order granted by the Board of Trade under the Electric Lighting Acts 1882 and 1888 to the County of London and Brush Provincial Electric Lighting Company Limited in respect of the District of the St. Olave District Board of Works in the County of London.	
	Strand District Electric Lighting Order 1896 Provisional Order under the Electric Lighting Acts 1882 and 1888 to the Charing Cross and Strand Electricity Supply Corporation Limited in respect of the District of the Strand District Board of Works in the County of London.	
Brine Pumping (Compensation for Subsidence) Provisional Order Confirmation Act 1896 (repealed)	59 & 60 Vict. c. iv	21 May 1896
An Act to confirm a Provisional Order for forming a Compensation District and establishing a Compensation Board under the Brine Pumping (Compensation for Subsidence) Act 1891. (Note: Brine Pumping (Compensation for Subsidence) Act 1891 (54 & 55 Vict. c. 40)) (Repealed by Cheshire Brine Pumping (Compensation for Subsidence) Act 1952 (15 & 16 Geo. 6 & 1 Eliz. 2. c. xlii))
	Northwich Salt Compensation District Order 1896 Provisional Order for forming a Compensation District and establishing a Compensation Board under the Brine Pumping (Compensation for Subsidence) Act 1891.	
Cupar Water Order Confirmation Act 1896	59 & 60 Vict. c. v	21 May 1896
An Act to confirm a Provisional Order under the Burgh Police (Scotland) Act 1892 (Note: Burgh Police (Scotland) Act 1892 (55 & 56 Vict. c. 55)) relating to Cupar Water.
	Cupar Water Order 1896 Provisional Order to authorise the Commissioners of the burgh of Cupar to borrow additional money in connection with their water undertaking.	
Aberdeen Improvement Scheme Provisional Order Confirmation Act 1896 (repealed)	59 & 60 Vict. c. vi	21 May 1896
An Act to confirm a Provisional Order made by the Secretary for Scotland under Part I. of the Housing of the Working Classes Act 1890 (Note: Housing of the Working Classes Act 1890 (53 & 54 Vict. c. 70)) relating to the City and Royal Burgh of Aberdeen. (Repealed by Aberdeen Corporation (Administration Finance, &c.) Order Confirmation Act 1940 (3 & 4 Geo. 6. c. iii))
	Aberdeen (Housing of Working Classes) Order 1896 Provisional Order for confirming an Improvement Scheme under Part I. of the Housing of the Working Classes Act 1890.	
Drainage and Improvement of Lands Supplemental (Ireland) Act 1896	59 & 60 Vict. c. vii	21 May 1896
An Act to confirm a Provisional Order under the Drainage and Improvement of Lands (Ireland) Act 1863 (Note: Drainage and Improvement of Lands (Ireland) Act 1863 (26 & 27 Vict. c. 88)) and the Acts amending the same relating to the Bunkey Drainage District in the Counties of Limerick and Tipperary.
	Bunkey Drainage District (Limerick and Tipperary) Order 1896 In the matter of the Bunkey Drainage District in the counties of Limerick and Tipperary.	
Kent and Surrey Permanent Benefit Building Society Act 1896	59 & 60 Vict. c. viii	21 May 1896
An Act to make provision with reference to the winding-up of the Kent and Surrey Permanent Benefit Building Society.
Millwall Dock Act 1896 (repealed)	59 & 60 Vict. c. ix	21 May 1896
An Act to extend the time for the sale of superfluous lands of the Millwall Dock Company. (Repealed by Port of London (Consolidation) Act 1920 (10 & 11 Geo. 5. c. clxxiii))
Uxbridge and Rickmansworth Railway Act 1896	59 & 60 Vict. c. x	21 May 1896
An Act for incorporating the Uxbridge and Rickmansworth Railway Company and for other purposes.
Liverpool Warehousing Company (Delivery Warrants) Act 1896	59 & 60 Vict. c. xi	21 May 1896
An Act to enable the Liverpool Warehousing Company Limited to issue transferable certificates and warrants for the delivery of goods and for other purposes.
Liverpool Electric Supply (Transfer) Act 1896 (repealed)	59 & 60 Vict. c. xii	21 May 1896
An Act to authorise the transfer of the undertaking of the Liverpool Electric Supply Company Limited to the Corporation of Liverpool. (Repealed by Liverpool Corporation Act 1921 (11 & 12 Geo. 5. c. lxxiv))
Cheltenham Gas Act 1896	59 & 60 Vict. c. xiii	21 May 1896
An Act to confer further powers on the Cheltenham Gas Light and Coke Company and for other purposes.
Customs Annuity and Benevolent Fund Act 1896	59 & 60 Vict. c. xiv	21 May 1896
An Act to incorporate the subscribers to the Customs' Annuity and Benevolent Fund and for other purposes.
English, Scottish and Australian Bank Limited Act 1896	59 & 60 Vict. c. xv	21 May 1896
An Act to enable certain alterations to be made in the Plan of Arrangement of the affairs of the English Scottish and Australian Chartered Bank and for other purposes.
Central Ireland Railway Act 1896	59 & 60 Vict. c. xvi	21 May 1896
An Act to confer further powers on the Waterford and Central Ireland Railway Company for the construction of new Railways to form part of the Central Ireland Railway to Authorise that Company and the Kilkenny Junction Railway Company to amalgamate their undertakings and for other purposes.
Sutton Bridge Dock Act 1896	59 & 60 Vict. c. xvii	21 May 1896
An Act to revive and extend some of the powers of the Sutton Bridge Dock Company to make further provisions with respect to their unissued capital and for other purposes.
Bideford, Westward Ho! and Appledore Railway Act 1896	59 & 60 Vict. c. xviii	21 May 1896
An Act for incorporating the Bideford Westward Ho! and Appledore Railway Company and for other purposes.
Cavendish, Harrington and Willington Bridges (Transfer) Act 1896	59 & 60 Vict. c. xix	21 May 1896
An Act to provide for the transfer of Cavendish Bridge to the County Council of Leicestershire and for the transfer of Harrington and Willington Bridges to the County Council of Derbyshire and for winding up the trusts of the said Bridges and for other purposes.
Dewsbury and Heckmondwike Water Act 1896	59 & 60 Vict. c. xx	21 May 1896
An Act for empowering the Dewsbury and Heckmondwike Waterworks Board to construct additional Waterworks and for other purposes.
Liverpool Cattle Market Act 1896	59 & 60 Vict. c. xxi	21 May 1896
An Act to incorporate and confer powers on the Liverpool Cattle Market Company and for other purposes.
Waterford Infirmary Act 1896 (repealed)	59 & 60 Vict. c. xxii	21 May 1896
An Act for appropriating the Leper Hospital of Saint Stephen in the City of Waterford and converting the same into a Public Infirmary for the County of Waterford and the County of the City of Waterford and to make provision for the establishment management and maintenance of the said Infirmary and for other purposes. (Repealed by Statute Law (Repeals) Act 2013 (c. 2))
Guildford Gas Act 1896	59 & 60 Vict. c. xxiii	21 May 1896
An Act for the granting of further powers to the Guildford Gaslight and Coke Company.
Great Eastern Railway (General Powers) Act 1896	59 & 60 Vict. c. xxiv	21 May 1896
An Act to confer further powers upon the Great Eastern Railway Company and for other purposes.
Ilfracombe Gas Act 1896	59 & 60 Vict. c. xxv	21 May 1896
An Act for conferring further powers on the Ilfracombe Gas Company.
Rotherham Corporation Act 1896	59 & 60 Vict. c. xxvi	21 May 1896
An Act to make further provision respecting the Gas and Water Supply of the Corporation of Rotherham and for other purposes.
Fylde Water Act 1896	59 & 60 Vict. c. xxvii	21 May 1896
An Act for the granting of further powers to the Fylde Waterworks Company and for other purposes.
Local Government Board's Provisional Order Confirmation (Poor Law) Act 1896	59 & 60 Vict. c. xxviii	21 May 1896
An Act to confirm a Provisional Order of the Local Government Board relating to the Parish of Saint Matthew Bethnal Green.
	Saint Matthew Bethnal Green Order 1896 Provisional Order made in pursuance of sub-section (3) of Section 2 of the Poor Law Act 1889. (Note: Poor Law Act 1889 (52 & 53 Vict. c. 56))	
Local Government Board's Provisional Orders Confirmation (No. 4) Act 1896	59 & 60 Vict. c. xxix	21 May 1896
An Act to confirm certain Provisional Orders of the Local Government Board relating to Clitheroe Goole Halifax Llandudno Plymouth Stratford-upon-Avon Swansea and Wallasey.
	Clitheroe Order 1896 Provisional Order for altering the Clitheroe Corporation Act of 1878. (Note: Clitheroe Corporation Act 1878 (41 & 42 Vict. c. lxxxiv))	
	Goole Order 1896 Provisional Order for partially repealing and altering the Goole and District Gas and Water Act 1881. (Note: Goole and District Gas and Water Act 1881 (44 & 45 Vict. c. lxxx))	
	Halifax Order 1896 Provisional Order for altering certain Confirming Acts.	
	Llandudno Order 1896 Provisional Order for altering a Local Act (Note: Llandudno Improvement Act 1854 (17 & 18 Vict. c. cii)) and a Confirming Act. (Note: Local Government Board's Provisional Orders Confirmation (No. 8) Act 1895 (58 & 59 Vict. c. lxxxviii))	
	Plymouth (Markets) Order 1896 Provisional Order for altering a Confirming Act. (Note: Local Government Board's Provisional Orders Confirmation (No. 7) Act 1883 (46 & 47 Vict. c. cxxxvii))	
	Stratford-upon-Avon Order 1896 Provisional Order for altering the Stratford-upon-Avon Borough Act 1879. (Note: Stratford-upon-Avon Borough Act 1879 (42 & 43 Vict. c. cxix))	
	Swansea Order 1896 Provisional Order for altering the Swansea Corporation Water Act 1892. (Note: Swansea Corporation Water Act 1892 (55 & 56 Vict. c. cxxxiii))	
	Wallasey Order 1896 Provisional Order for altering a Confirming Act. (Note: Local Government Board's Provisional Orders Confirmation (No. 12) Act 1892 (55 & 56 Vict. c. ccxxiii))	
Local Government Board's Provisional Orders Confirmation (No. 5) Act 1896	59 & 60 Vict. c. xxx	21 May 1896
An Act to confirm certain Provisional Orders of the Local Government Board relating to the Brighouse Fulstone-and-Hepworth Hanley-Stoke-and-Fenton Hertford-and-Ware Isle-of-Thanet Sittingbourne-and-Milton Stone Stroud and Wallsend-and-Willington-Quay Joint Hospital Districts.
	Brighouse Joint Hospital Order 1896 Provisional Order for altering a Confirming Act. (Note: Local Government Board's Provisional Orders Confirmation (No. 10) Act 1893 (56 & 57 Vict. c. cxix))	
	Fulstone and Hepworth Joint Hospital Order 1896 Provisional Order for partially repealing a Confirming Act. (Note: Local Government Board's Provisional Orders Confirmation (No. 9) Act 1894 (57 & 58 Vict. c. cxxi))	
	Hanley, Stoke and Fenton Joint Hospital Order 1896 Provisional Order for altering a Confirming Act. (Note: Local Government Board's Provisional Orders Confirmation (Abergavenny, &c.) Act 1880 (43 & 44 Vict. c. lviii))	
	Hertford and Ware Joint Hospital Order 1896 Provisional Order for partially repealing and altering a Confirming Act. (Note: Local Government Board's Provisional Orders Confirmation (No. 2) Act 1893 (56 & 57 Vict. c. cix))	
	Isle of Thanet Joint Hospital Order 1896 Provisional Order for partially repealing and altering certain Confirming Acts.	
	Sittingbourne and Milton Joint Hospital Order 1896 Provisional Order for partially repealing and altering a Confirming Act. (Note: Local Government Board's Provisional Orders Confirmation (Castleton-by-Rochdale, &c.) Act 1879 (42 & 43 Vict. c. lxxxvi))	
	Stone Joint Hospital Order 1896 Provisional Order for partially repealing and altering a Confirming Act. (Note: Local Government Board's Provisional Orders Confirmation (No. 18) Act 1894 (57 & 58 Vict. c. cxxxi))	
	Stroud Joint Hospital Order 1896 Provisional Order for partially repealing and altering a Confirming Act. (Note: Local Government Board's Provisional Orders Confirmation Act 1894 (57 & 58 Vict. c. xix))	
	Wallsend and Willington Quay Joint Hospital Order 1896 Provisional Order for altering a Confirming Act. (Note: Local Government Board's Provisional Orders Confirmation (No. 7) Act 1892 (55 & 56 Vict. c. cxcviii))	
Buenos Ayres and Ensenada Port Railway Company Act 1896	59 & 60 Vict. c. xxxi	2 July 1896
An Act for the conversion of the existing Preference Stock of the Buenos Ayres and Ensenada Port Railway Company Limited and for other purposes.
Birmingham Corporation Water Act 1896	59 & 60 Vict. c. xxxii	2 July 1896
An Act for empowering the Corporation of Birmingham to make certain deviations of the Aqueduct authorised by the Birmingham Corporation Water Act 1892 (Note: Birmingham Corporation Water Act 1892 (55 & 56 Vict. c. clxxiii)) and to construct an additional short line of railway and to acquire additional lands and for other purposes.
Brighton and Rottingdean Seashore Electric Tramroad Act 1896	59 & 60 Vict. c. xxxiii	2 July 1896
An Act to extend the time for completing and opening the Brighton and Rottingdean Seashore Electric Tramroad to raise additional Capital and for other purposes.
Dundee Harbour (Additional Powers) Act 1896 (repealed)	59 & 60 Vict. c. xxxiv	2 July 1896
An Act to confer additional powers on the Trustees of the Harbour of Dundee and to amend the Acts relating to the Harbour and for other purposes. (Repealed by Dundee Harbour and Tay Ferries Consolidation Act 1911 (1 & 2 Geo. 5. c. lxxx))
Glasgow Juvenile Delinquency Prevention and Repression Amendment Act 1896 (repealed)	59 & 60 Vict. c. xxxv	2 July 1896
An Act to amend the Glasgow Juvenile Delinquency Prevention and Repression Act 1878. (Note: Glasgow Juvenile Delinquency Prevention and Repression Act 1878 (41 & 42 Vict. c. cxxi)) (Repealed by Glasgow Education Authority (Juvenile Delinquency) Order Confirmation Act 1926 (16 & 17 Geo. 5. c. xxxvii))
Metropolitan Market Act 1896 (repealed)	59 & 60 Vict. c. xxxvi	2 July 1896
An Act for amending the Metropolitan Market Acts 1857 (Note: Metropolitan Market Act 1857 (20 & 21 Vict. c. cxxxv)) and 1865 (Note: Metropolitan Market Act 1865 (28 & 29 Vict. c. ccviii)) and for other purposes. (Repealed by City of London (Various Powers) Act 1963 (c. xxxiv))
Muirkirk, Mauchline and Dalmellington Railways Act 1896 (repealed)	59 & 60 Vict. c. xxxvii	2 July 1896
An Act to authorise the construction of Railways from and to Muirkirk Mauchline and Dalmellington and other places in the County of Ayr. (Repealed by Muirkirk, Mauchline and Dalmellington Railways (Abandonment) Act 1900 (63 & 64 Vict. c. ccliii))
British Gas Light Company (Norwich) Act 1896	59 & 60 Vict. c. xxxviii	2 July 1896
An Act for empowering the British Gas Light Company Limited to extend their Works and to expend further Capital at Norwich.
Great Northern London Cemetery Act 1896 (repealed)	59 & 60 Vict. c. xxxix	2 July 1896
An Act to amend the Great Northern London Cemetery Act 1876 (Note: Great Northern London Cemetery Act 1876 (39 & 40 Vict. c. ccxvii)) in reference to the disposal of superfluous lands and for other purposes. (Repealed by Great Northern London Cemetery Act 1976 (c. xxvii))
Irvine Burgh Improvement Act 1896	59 & 60 Vict. c. xl	2 July 1896
An Act for empowering the Corporation of the Royal Burgh of Irvine to construct a Weir or Dam across the River Irvine to construct a new Bridge over the said river with roads of access thereto to widen alter and improve streets and for other purposes.
Whitstable Oyster Fishery Act 1896	59 & 60 Vict. c. xli	2 July 1896
An Act for reconstituting the Company of Free Fishers and Dredgers of Whitstable in the county of Kent and for altering and enlarging their powers and for other purposes.
East and West Yorkshire Union Railways (South Leeds Junction Railway Transfer) Act 1896	59 & 60 Vict. c. xlii	2 July 1896
An Act for vesting the undertaking of the South Leeds Junction Railway Company in the East and West Yorkshire Union Railways Company and for other purposes.
National Mutual Life Assurance Society Act 1896	59 & 60 Vict. c. xliii	2 July 1896
An Act to empower the National Life Assurance Society and the Mutual Life Assurance Society to amalgamate and for other purposes.
King's Lynn Corporation Act 1896	59 & 60 Vict. c. xliv	2 July 1896
An Act to enable the Mayor Aldermen and Burgesses of the Borough of King's Lynn to cover over a portion of the Mill Fleet and with the consent of the Commissioners of Sewers for the County of Norfolk to use the Middleton Stop Drain as storm overflows and to raise additional moneys and for other purposes.
William Hancock and Company (Further Capital) Act 1896	59 & 60 Vict. c. xlv	2 July 1896
An Act for the creation of New Preferred and Deferred Converted Ordinary Shares of William Hancock and Company Limited and for other purposes.
Cawood Wistow and Selby Light Railway Act 1896	59 & 60 Vict. c. xlvi	2 July 1896
An Act for incorporating the Cawood Wistow and Selby Light Railway Company and for other purposes.
Newport, Godshill, and St. Lawrence Railway Act 1896	59 & 60 Vict. c. xlvii	2 July 1896
An Act to authorise the Newport Godshill and St. Lawrence Railway Company to further improve and extend their Railway towards Ventnor and for other purposes.
Leeds Hydraulic Power Act 1896	59 & 60 Vict. c. xlviii	2 July 1896
An Act to amend Section 61 of the Leeds Hydraulic Power Act 1886. (Note: Leeds Hydraulic Power Act 1886 (49 & 50 Vict. c. lxxxiii))
Padiham Urban District Council (Water) Act 1896 (repealed)	59 & 60 Vict. c. xlix	2 July 1896
An Act to extend the time limited by the Padiham Local Board Act 1889 (Note: Padiham Local Board Act 1889 (52 & 53 Vict. c. lii)) for the construction of certain works thereby authorised. (Repealed by Calder Water Board Order 1962 (SI 1962/1939))
South Shields Corporation Act 1896	59 & 60 Vict. c. l	2 July 1896
An Act to empower the Corporation of the Borough of South Shields to apply for an increase of Aldermen and Councillors to construct Street Tramway Quay and other works to make better provision for the health and good government of the Borough and for other purposes.
London County Tramways Act 1896	59 & 60 Vict. c. li	2 July 1896
An Act to enable the London County Council to work their Tramways and for other purposes.
Barnsley Corporation (Water) Act 1896	59 & 60 Vict. c. lii	2 July 1896
An Act to empower the Corporation of Barnsley to obtain Water from Hagg Brook and other tributaries of the River Porter or Little Don in the Township of Bradfield for the supply of the Borough of Barnsley and other places and to borrow further Money to extend their Limits of Water Supply and for other purposes.
Sheffield Tramways Act 1896 (repealed)	59 & 60 Vict. c. liii	2 July 1896
An Act to extend the Agreement scheduled to the Sheffield Tramways Act 1872 (Note: Sheffield Tramways Act 1872 (35 & 36 Vict. c. cxliii)) and to authorise the winding up voluntarily of the Sheffield Tramways Company. (Repealed by Sheffield Corporation (Consolidation) Act 1918 (8 & 9 Geo. 5. c. lxi))
Lambeth Waterworks Act 1896	59 & 60 Vict. c. liv	2 July 1896
An Act to authorise the Company of Proprietors of Lambeth Waterworks to execute further works and to raise further money and for other purposes.
Brixham Harbour and Market Act 1896 (repealed)	59 & 60 Vict. c. lv	2 July 1896
An Act to transfer to and vest in the Urban District Council of the Urban District of Brixham in the County of Devon the undertaking of the Commissioners for improving the Harbour and Market of Brixham to dissolve those Commissioners and for other purposes. (Repealed by Tor Bay Harbour Act 1970 (c. liii))
Mersey Railway Act 1896	59 & 60 Vict. c. lvi	2 July 1896
An Act to authorise the Mersey Railway Company to work the Traffic on their Railways by Electrical or other Motive Power and for other purposes.
Bexhill Water and Gas Act 1896	59 & 60 Vict. c. lvii	2 July 1896
An Act for authorising the Bexhill Water and Gas Company to acquire additional Lands and to raise further Capital and for other purposes.
Colwyn Bay and District Gas Act 1896 (repealed)	59 & 60 Vict. c. lviii	2 July 1896
An Act for incorporating and conferring powers on the Colwyn Bay and District Gas Company. (Repealed by Colwyn Bay and Colwyn Urban District Gas Act 1901 (1 Edw. 7. c. lxxix))
Roxburgh, Berwick and Selkirk District Board of Lunacy (Water Supply) Act 1896	59 & 60 Vict. c. lix	2 July 1896
An Act to empower the Roxburgh Berwick and Selkirk District Board of Lunacy to construct Waterworks for the supply of water to their Asylum to make provision for the cost of such works and for other purposes.
Cowes Gas Act 1896	59 & 60 Vict. c. lx	2 July 1896
An Act for incorporating and conferring powers on the Cowes Gas Company.
Falkirk and District Water (Additional Supply) Act 1896	59 & 60 Vict. c. lxi	2 July 1896
An Act to provide an additional supply of Water to the Burgh of Falkirk and districts and places adjacent and for the construction and maintenance of new and additional Waterworks to confer further powers on the Falkirk and Larbert Water Trustees and for other purposes.
Stroud and Painswick (Light) Railway Act 1896	59 & 60 Vict. c. lxii	2 July 1896
An Act for making a Railway from Stroud to Painswick to be called the Stroud and Painswick (light) Railway and for other purposes.
Stafford Corporation Act 1896 (repealed)	59 & 60 Vict. c. lxiii	2 July 1896
An Act for conferring on the Corporation of the borough of Stafford further sanitary and other powers. (Repealed by Staffordshire Act 1983 (c. xviii))
Manchester Corporation Act 1896	59 & 60 Vict. c. lxiv	2 July 1896
An Act to confer further powers upon the Mayor Aldermen and Citizens of the City of Manchester in the County of Lancaster with respect to Street Improvements and other works and the acquisition of Lands to provide for the transfer of the Monsall Hospital to the Corporation and for extending the limits for the Supply of Water by the Corporation and for other purposes.
Leeds Corporation Tramways Act 1896 (repealed)	59 & 60 Vict. c. lxv	2 July 1896
An Act to empower the Mayor Aldermen and Citizens of the City of Leeds to construct additional Tramways and for other purposes. (Repealed by Leeds Corporation (Consolidation) Act 1905 (5 Edw. 7. c. i))
Rother Valley (Light) Railway Act 1896	59 & 60 Vict. c. lxvi	2 July 1896
An Act for making a Light Railway between Salehurst in the county of Sussex and Tenterden in the county of Kent and for other purposes.
Huddersfield Waterworks Act 1896 (repealed)	59 & 60 Vict. c. lxvii	2 July 1896
An Act to authorise the Mayor Aldermen and Burgesses of the county borough of Huddersfield to construct additional Waterworks and for other purposes. (Repealed by West Yorkshire Act 1980 (c. xiv))
Lanarkshire (Middle Ward District) Water Act 1896 (repealed)	59 & 60 Vict. c. lxviii	2 July 1896
An Act to empower the District Committee of the Middle Ward of the County of Lanark to abandon certain Works authorised by the Lanarkshire (Middle Ward District) Water Act 1892 (Note: Lanarkshire (Middle Ward District) Water Act 1892 (55 & 56 Vict. c. clxix)) and to construct additional Waterworks to amend the provisions of that Act to authorise and require the County Council of the County of Lanark to levy Assessments and to borrow Money and for other purposes. (Repealed by Lanarkshire County Council Order Confirmation Act 1939 (2 & 3 Geo. 6. c. xcii))
Great Southern and Western Railway Act 1896	59 & 60 Vict. c. lxix	2 July 1896
An Act for transferring to the Great Southern and Western Railway Company the powers of the Drumcondra and North Dublin link Railway Company incorporated by the Drumcondra and North Dublin Link Railway Act 1894 (Note: Drumcondra and North Dublin Link Railway Act 1894 (57 & 58 Vict. c. ccxiv)) to empower the Great Southern and Western Railway Company to abandon the construction of Railway No. 2 authorised by that Act and to construct another Railway in lieu thereof to stop up certain Streets and Roads to enter into Agreements with other Companies and for other purposes.
Cambrian Railways Act 1896	59 & 60 Vict. c. lxx	2 July 1896
An Act for empowering the Cambrian Railways Company to make approach roads to certain of their Stations to acquire additional Lands to raise further Money for those purposes and also for doubling and improving their Line and for other purposes.
Ystradyfodwg Urban District Council (Gas and Water) Act 1896 (repealed)	59 & 60 Vict. c. lxxi	2 July 1896
An Act for authorising the Ystradyfodwg Urban District Council to acquire the Gas and Water Undertakings of the Ystrad Gas and Water Company to construct Waterworks and for other purposes. (Repealed by Rhondda Corporation Act 1973 (c. xxiii))
Malvern Link (Extension and Water) Act 1896	59 & 60 Vict. c. lxxii	2 July 1896
An Act to extend the District of the Malvern Link Urban District Council to authorise the Urban District Council of the extended District to construct Waterworks for the supply thereof and for other purposes.
Chelsea Waterworks Act 1896	59 & 60 Vict. c. lxxiii	2 July 1896
An Act to authorise the Governor and Company of Chelsea Waterworks to lay down a New Main from West Molesey to Surbiton to construct an additional Filter Bed and other Works at Surbiton and to raise further money by debenture stock and to confer further powers upon them.
Local Government Board's Provisional Orders Confirmation (No. 1) Act 1896	59 & 60 Vict. c. lxxiv	2 July 1896
An Act to confirm certain Provisional Orders of the Local Government Board relating to the Borough of Bridgwater and to the Counties of Cambridge and Hertford.
	Borough of Bridgwater Order 1896 Provisional Order made in pursuance of Sections 54 and 59 of the Local Government Act 1888. (Note: Local Government Act 1888 (51 & 52 Vict. c. 41))	
	County of Hertford (Royston) Order 1896 Provisional Order made in pursuance of Section 54 of the Local Government Act 1888 for altering the Boundary between Counties.	
Local Government Board's Provisional Orders Confirmation (No. 3) Act 1896	59 & 60 Vict. c. lxxv	2 July 1896
An Act to confirm certain Provisional Orders of the Local Government Board relating to the Counties of Devon Dorset Gloucester Somerset Warwick Wilts and Worcester.
	County of Devon (Chardstock and Hawkchurch) Order 1896 Provisional Order made in pursuance of Section 54 of the Local Government Act 1888 for altering the Boundary between Counties.	
	County of Somerset (Churchstanton) Order 1896 Provisional Order made in pursuance of Section 54 of the Local Government Act 1888 for altering the Boundary between Counties.	
	County of Gloucester (Batsford) Order 1896 Provisional Order made in pursuance of Section 54 of the Local Government Act 1888 for altering the Boundary between Counties.	
	County of Wiltshire (Kilmington) Order 1896 Provisional Order made in pursuance of Section 54 of the Local Government Act 1888 for altering the Boundary between Counties.	
	County of Warwick (Oldberrow) Order 1896 Provisional Order made in pursuance of Section 54 of the Local Government Act 1888 for altering the Boundary between Counties.	
Local Government Board's Provisional Orders Confirmation (Poor Law) (No. 2) Act 1896	59 & 60 Vict. c. lxxvi	2 July 1896
An Act to confirm certain Provisional Orders of the Local Government Board relating to the City of Oxford and the Parish of Whitechapel.
	Oxford (Poor Law) Order 1896 Provisional Order for altering a Local Act (Note: Oxford Poor Act 1854 (17 & 18 Vict. c. ccxix)) and a Confirming Act. (Note: Local Government Board's Provisional Orders Confirmation Act 1889 (52 & 53 Vict. c. xv))	
	Whitechapel Order 1896 Provisional Order for altering the Whitechapel Improvement Act 1853. (Note: Whitechapel Improvement Act 1853 (16 & 17 Vict. c. cxli))	
Bonnybridge, &c. Water Order Confirmation Act 1896	59 & 60 Vict. c. lxxvii	2 July 1896
An Act to confirm a Provisional Order under the Public Health (Scotland) Act 1867 (Note: Public Health (Scotland) Act 1867 (30 & 31 Vict. c. 101)) and any Acts amending the same relating to Bonnybridge Dennyloanhead Parkfoot Longcroft Haggs and Hollandbush Water.
	Bonnybridge, &c. Water Order 1896 Provisional Order.	
Canal Rates Tolls and Charges (Strabane Canal) Order Confirmation Act 1896	59 & 60 Vict. c. lxxviii	2 July 1896
An Act to confirm a Provisional Order made by the Board of Trade under the Railway and Canal Traffic Act 1888 (Note: Railway and Canal Traffic Act 1888 (51 & 52 Vict. c. 25)) containing the Classification of Merchandise Traffic and the Schedule of Maximum Rates Tolls and Charges applicable thereto for the Strabane Canal.
	Canal Rates Tolls and Charges (Strabane Canal) Order 1896 Order of the Board of Trade under the Railway and Canal Traffic Act 1888 embodying the Classification of Merchandise Traffic and the authorised Schedule of Maximum Rates Tolls and Charges including all Terminal and Wharfage Charges applicable to the said Classification for the Strabane Canal.	
Canal Tolls and Charges (Caledonian and Crinan Canals) Order Confirmation Act 1896	59 & 60 Vict. c. lxxix	2 July 1896
An Act to confirm a Provisional Order made by the Board of Trade under the Railway and Canal Traffic Act 1888 containing the Classification of Merchandise Traffic and the Schedule of Maximum Tolls and Charges applicable thereto for the Caledonian and Crinan Canals.
	Canal Tolls and Charges (Caledonian and Crinan Canals) Order 1896 Order of the Board of Trade under the Railway and Canal Traffic Act 1888 embodying the Classification of Merchandise Traffic and the authorised Schedule of Maximum Tolls and Charges including all Wharfage Charges applicable to the said Classification for the Caledonian and Crinan Canals.	
Canal Tolls and Charges (Burwell Fen &c.) Order Confirmation Act 1896	59 & 60 Vict. c. lxxx	2 July 1896
An Act to confirm a Provisional Order made by the Board of Trade under the Railway and Canal Traffic Act 1888 containing the Classification of Merchandise Traffic and the Schedule of Maximum Tolls and Charges applicable thereto for the Canals of the Burwell Fen Drainage and Navigation Commissioners and certain other Canals.
	Canal Tolls and Charges (Burwell Fen &c.) Order 1896 Order of the Board of Trade under the Railway and Canal Traffic Act 1888 embodying the Classification of Merchandise Traffic and the authorised Schedule of Maximum Tolls and Charges including all Wharfage Charges applicable to the said Classification for the Canals of the Burwell Fen Drainage and Navigation Commissioners and of the Commissioners of the Swaffham and Bottisham Drainage District.	
Metropolitan Police Provisional Order Confirmation Act 1896 (repealed)	59 & 60 Vict. c. lxxxi	2 July 1896
An Act to confirm a Provisional Order made by one of Her Majesty's Principal Secretaries of State under the Metropolitan Police Act 1886 (Note: Metropolitan Police Act 1886 (49 & 50 Vict. c. 22)) relating to lands in the Parishes of St. John the Evangelist Westminster and All Saints Poplar. (Repealed by Statute Law (Repeals) Act 2008 (c. 12))
	Order made by the Secretary of State under the Metropolitan Police Act 1886.	
Electric Lighting Orders Confirmation (No. 1) Act 1896	59 & 60 Vict. c. lxxxii	2 July 1896
An Act to confirm certain Provisional Orders made by the Board of Trade under the Electric Lighting Acts 1882 and 1888 relating to Cowes Folkestone Gloucester Huddersfield King's Lynn Manchester and Wells.
	Cowes Electric Lighting Order 1896 Provisional Order granted by the Board of Trade under the Electric Lighting Acts 1882 and 1888 to the Cowes District Council in respect of the Urban District of Cowes.	
	Folkestone Electric Lighting Order 1896 Provisional Order granted by the Board of Trade under the Electric Lighting Acts 1882 and 1888 to the Mayor Aldermen and Burgesses of the Borough of Folkestone acting by the Corporation as the Urban District Council for the Urban District of Folkestone.	
	Gloucester Corporation Electric Supply Order 1896 Provisional Order granted by the Board of Trade under the Electric Lighting Acts 1882 and 1888 to the Mayor Aldermen and Citizens of the City of Gloucester in the County of the City of Gloucester in respect of the said City.	
	Huddersfield Electric Lighting Order 1896 Provisional Order granted by the Board of Trade under the Electric Lighting Acts 1882 and 1888 to the Mayor Aldermen and Burgesses of the County Borough of Huddersfield in respect of the County Borough of Huddersfield.	
	Kings Lynn Electric Lighting Order 1896 Provisional Order granted by the Board of Trade under the Electric Lighting Acts 1882 and 1888 to the Mayor Aldermen and Burgesses of the Borough of Kings Lynn in the County of Norfolk in respect of the Borough of Kings Lynn.	
	Manchester Electric Lighting Order 1896 Provisional Order granted by the Board of Trade under the Electric Lighting Acts 1882 and 1888 to the Mayor Aldermen and Citizens of the City of Manchester for extending their area of supply.	
	City of Wells Corporation Electric Lighting Order 1896 Provisional Order granted. by the Board of Trade under the Electric Lighting Acts 1882 and 1888 to the Mayor Aldermen and Citizens of the City of Wells in respect of the City of Wells.	
Electric Lighting Orders Confirmation (No. 2) Act 1896	59 & 60 Vict. c. lxxxiii	2 July 1896
An Act to confirm certain Provisional Orders made by the Board of Trade under the Electric Lighting Acts 1882 and 1888 relating to Colwyn Bay and Colwyn Devonport Godalming Kettering Kingstown and Middleton.
	Colwyn Bay and Colwyn Electric Lighting Order 1896 Provisional Order granted by the Board of Trade under the Electric Lighting Acts 1882 and 1888 to the Urban District Council of Colwyn Bay and Colwyn in respect of the Urban District of Colwyn Bay and Colwyn in the Counties of Denbigh and Carnarvon.	
	Devonport Corporation Electric Lighting Order 1896 Provisional Order granted by the Board of Trade under the Electric Lighting Acts 1882 and 1888 to the Mayor Aldermen and Burgesses of the County Borough of Devonport in respect of the County Borough of Devonport.	
	Godalming Electric Lighting Order 1896 Provisional Order granted by the Board of Trade under the Electric Lighting Acts 1882 and 1888 to the Mayor Aldermen and Burgesses of the Borough of Godalming in respect of the Borough of Godalming in the County of Surrey.	
	Kettering Electric Lighting Order 1896 Provisional Order granted by the Board of Trade under the Electric Lighting Acts 1882 and 1888 to the Urban District Council of Kettering in respect of the Urban District of Kettering.	
	Kingstown Township Electric Lighting Order 1896 Provisional Order granted by the Board of Trade under the Electric Lighting Acts 1882 and 1888 to the Commissioners of the Township of Kingstown in respect of the Township of Kingstown in the County of Dublin.	
	Middleton Electric Lighting Order 1896 Provisional Order granted by the Board of Trade under the Electric Lighting Acts 1882 and 1888 to the Mayor Aldermen and Burgesses of the Borough of Middleton in respect of the Borough of Middleton.	
Electric Lighting Orders Confirmation (No. 6) Act 1896	59 & 60 Vict. c. lxxxiv	2 July 1896
by the Board of Trade under the Electric Lighting Acts 1882 and 1888 relating to Ashton-on-Mersey and Bucklow and Keswick.
	Ashton-on-Mersey Electric Lighting Order 1896 Provisional Order granted by the Board of Trade under the Electric Lighting Acts 1882 and 1888 to the Altrincham Electric Supply Limited in respect of the District of the Ashton-on-Mersey Urban District Council and part of the District of the Bucklow Rural District Council both in the County of Chester.	
	Keswick Electric Lighting Order 1896 Provisional Order granted by the Board of Trade under the Electric Lighting Acts 1882 and 1888 to the Keswick Urban District Council in respect of the Urban District of Keswick.	
Local Government Board (Ireland) Provisional Orders Confirmation (No. 3) Act 1896	59 & 60 Vict. c. lxxxv	2 July 1896
An Act to confirm two Provisional Orders made by the Local Government Board for Ireland under the Public Health (Ireland) Act 1878 (Note: Public Health (Ireland) Act 1878 (41 & 42 Vict. c 52)) relating to the Urban Sanitary Districts of Londonderry and Ballinasloe.
	Londonderry Waterworks Provisional Order 1896 Londonderry Waterworks. Provisional Order.	
	Ballinasloe Waterworks Provisional Order 1896 Ballinasloe Waterworks. Provisional Order.	
Local Government Board (Ireland) Provisional Order Confirmation (No. 4) Act 1896	59 & 60 Vict. c. lxxxvi	2 July 1896
An Act to confirm a Provisional Order made by the Local Government Board for Ireland under the Public Health (Ireland) Act 1878 relating to the Rural Sanitary District of the Belfast Union.
	Molusk Burial Ground Provisional Order 1896 Belfast Union.—Molusk Burial Ground. Provisional Order.	
Local Government Board (Ireland) Provisional Order Confirmation (No. 5) Act 1896	59 & 60 Vict. c. lxxxvii	2 July 1896
An Act to confirm a Provisional Order made by the Local Government Board for Ireland under the Public Health (Ireland) Act 1878 relating to the Town of Portrusb.
	Portrush Town Provisional Order 1896 Town of Portrush. Provisional Order.	
Local Government Board (Ireland) Provisional Order Confirmation (No. 6) Act 1896 (repealed)	59 & 60 Vict. c. lxxxviii	2 July 1896
An Act to confirm a Provisional Order made by the Local Government Board for Ireland under the Public Health (Ireland) Act 1878 relating to the Urban Sanitary District of Coleraine. (Repealed by Local Government Board (Ireland) Provisional Orders Confirmation (No. 3) Act 1898 (61 & 62 Vict. c. xc))
	Coleraine Waterworks Provisional Order 1896. Coleraine Additional Waterworks. Provisional Order.	
Local Government Board (Ireland) Provisional Order Confirmation (No. 7) Act 1896	59 & 60 Vict. c. lxxxix	2 July 1896
An Act to confirm a Provisional Order made by the Local Government Board for Ireland under the Public Health (Ireland) Act 1878 relating to the Rural Sanitary District of the Sligo Union.
	Carrigeens Burial Ground Provisional Order 1896 Sligo Union. Carrigeens Burial Ground. Provisional Order.	
Local Government Board (Ireland) Provisional Orders Confirmation (No. 8) Act 1896	59 & 60 Vict. c. xc	2 July 1896
An Act to confirm certain Provisional Orders made by the Local Government Board for Ireland under the Public Health (Ireland) Act 1878 relating to the Sanitary Districts of Queenstown Lame Manorhamilton and Donegal.
	Queenstown Waterworks Provisional Order 1896 Queenstown Waterworks. Provisional Order.	
	Larne Waterworks Provisional Order 1896 Larne Waterworks. Provisional Order.	
	Manorhamilton Waterworks Provisional Order 1896 Manorhamilton Waterworks. Provisional Order.	
	Donegal Waterworks Provisional Order 1896 Donegal Waterworks. Provisional Order.	
Local Government Board (Ireland) Provisional Order Confirmation (No. 10) Act 1896	59 & 60 Vict. c. xci	2 July 1896
An Act to confirm a Provisional Order made by the Local Government Board for Ireland under the Public Health (Ireland) Act 1878 relating to the Rural Sanitary District of the Sligo Union.
	Carrownanty Burial Ground Provisional Order 1896 Sligo Union—Carrownanty Burial Ground. Provisional Order.	
Local Government Board (Ireland) Provisional Order Confirmation (No. 12) Act 1896	59 & 60 Vict. c. xcii	2 July 1896
An Act to confirm a Provisional Order made by the Local Government Board for Ireland under the Public Health (Ireland) Act 1878 relating to the Rural Sanitary District of Mullingar.
	Mullingar Waterworks Provisional Order 1896 Mullingar Waterworks. Provisional Order.	
Land Drainage Supplemental Act 1896	59 & 60 Vict. c. xciii	2 July 1896
An Act to confirm a Provisional Order under the Land Drainage Act 1861 (Note: Land Drainage Act 1861 (24 & 25 Vict. c. 133)) relating to the Langley Chedgrave and Toft Monks Marshes in the Parishes of Langley Chedgrave Toft Monks Stockton Haddiscoe Loddon Raveningham and Reedham in the county of Norfolk.
	Langley Chedgrave and Toft Monks Marshes (Norfolk) Order 1896 In the matter of Langley Chedgrave and Toft Monks Marshes situate in the parishes of Langley Chedgrave Toft Monks Stockton Haddiscoe Loddon Raveningham and Reedham in the county of Norfolk.	
Pier and Harbour Orders Confirmation (No. 2) Act 1896	59 & 60 Vict. c. xciv	2 July 1896
An Act to confirm certain Provisional Orders made by the Board of Trade under the General Pier and Harbour Act 1861 (Note: General Pier and Harbour Act 1861 (24 & 25 Vict. c. 45)) relating to Birchington Bexhill Herne Bay Penzance Porthgain Stonehaven and Studland.
	Birchington-on-Sea Pier Order 1896 Order for the Construction Maintenance and Regulation of a Pier at Birchington-on-Sea in the County of Kent.	
	Bexhill Promenade and Landing Pier Order 1896 Order for the Construction Maintenance and Regulation of a Promenade and Landing Pier at Bexhill in the County of Sussex.	
	Herne Bay Pier Order 1896 Order for reviving the powers conferred by the Herne Bay Pier Order 1891 for the construction of the Extension of the Pier and other Works at Herne Bay in the County of Kent.	
	Porthgain Harbour Order 1896 Order for the Improvement Maintenance and Regulation of the Harbour of Porthgain in the County of Pembroke and authorising the construction of a Wet Dock in connexion therewith.	
	Stonehaven Harbour Order 1896 Order for reviving the powers and extending the time for the construction of Works at the Harbour of Stonehaven in the County of Kincardine authorised by the Stonehaven Harbour Order 1891.	
	Studland Pier Order 1896 Order for the Construction Maintenance and Regulation of a Promenade Pier at Studland in the County of Dorset and for other purposes.	
Gas Orders Confirmation Act 1896	59 & 60 Vict. c. xcv	2 July 1896
An Act to confirm certain Provisional Orders made by the Board of Trade under the Gas and Water Works Facilities Act 1870 (Note: Gas and Water Works Facilities Act 1870 (33 & 34 Vict. c. 70)) relating to Chester-le-Street and Pelton Gas Maidstone Gas and Settle Gas.
	Chester-le-Street and Pelton Gas Order 1896 Order empowering the Parish Lighting Company Limited to maintain and continue Gasworks and to manufacture and supply Gas in the Townships of Chester-le-Street and Pellon in the Parishes of Chester-le-Street and Pelton in the County of Durham.	
	Maidstone Gas Order 1896 Order empowering the Maidstone Gas Company to raise further money by the creation and issue of Debenture Stock.	
	Settle Gas Order 1896 Order empowering the Settle Gas Company Limited to maintain and continue Gas Works and to manufacture and supply gas in the Townships of Settle and Giggleswick in the West Riding of the County of York.	
Boyne Navigation Transfer Act 1896	59 & 60 Vict. c. xcvi	20 July 1896
An Act to transfer the Upper and Lower Boyne Navigations to the Boyne Navigation Company (Limited).
Pilotage Order Confirmation Act 1896	59 & 60 Vict. c. xcvii	20 July 1896
An Act to confirm a Provisional Order made by the Board of Trade under the Merchant Shipping Act 1894 (Note: Merchant Shipping Act 1894 (57 & 58 Vict. c. 60)) relating to the London and English Channel Pilotage Districts.
	London and Channel Pilotage Order 1896 Order providing for the Representation of Pilots and Shipowners on the Pilotage Committee of the Pilotage Authority of the London District and the English Channel District.	
Gas and Water Orders Confirmation Act 1896	59 & 60 Vict. c. xcviii	20 July 1896
An Act to confirm certain Provisional Orders made by the Board of Trade under the Gas and Water Works Facilities Act 1870 relating to Fort William Gas and Laindon Gas and Water.
	Fort William Gas Order 1896 Order authorising the maintenance and continuance of Gasworks and the Manufacture and Supply of Gas in the Burgh of Fort William in the County of Inverness.	
	Laindon Gas and Water Order 1896 Order empowering the Laindon Gas and Water Company Limited to construct and maintain Gasworks and Waterworks to supply Water and to make and supply Gas within the Parishes of Laindon and Little Burstead in the County of Essex.	
Kelty Water Order Confirmation Act 1896	59 & 60 Vict. c. xcix	20 July 1896
An Act to confirm a Provisional Order under the Public Health (Scotland) Act 1867 and any Acts amending the same relating to Kelty Water.
	Kelty Water Order 1896 Provisional Order.	
Local Government Board's Provisional Order Confirmation (Ports) Act 1896	59 & 60 Vict. c. c	20 July 1896
An Act to confirm a Provisional Order of the Local Government Board relating to the Ports of Colchester Newcastle North Shields Plymouth South Shields and Weymouth.
	Port Sanitary Authorities (Repeal) Order 1896 Provisional Order for partially repealing certain Confirming Acts.	
Local Government Board's Provisional Orders Confirmation (No. 6) Act 1896	59 & 60 Vict. c. ci	20 July 1896
An Act to confirm certain Provisional Orders of the Local Government Board relating to Axbridge Basford Bath Cambridge Carlisle Hanwell Richmond (Surrey) Southall-Norwood Stocksbridge Waltham-Holy-Cross and Woking.
	Axbridge (Rural) Order 1896 Provisional Order to enable the Rural District Council of Axbridge to put in force the Compulsory Clauses of the Lands Clauses Acts.	
	Basford (Selston) Order 1896 Provisional Order to enable the Rural District Council of Basford to put in force the Compulsory Clauses of the Lands Clauses Acts.	
	Bath Order 1896 Provisional Order to enable the Urban Sanitary Authority for the City of Bath to put in force the Compulsory Clauses of the Lands Clauses Acts.	
	Cambridge Order 1896 Provisional Order to enable the Urban District Council for the Borough of Cambridge to put in force the Compulsory Clauses of the Lands Clauses Acts.	
	Carlisle Order 1896 Provisional Order to enable the Urban District Council for the City of Carlisle to put in force the Compulsory Clauses of the Lands Clauses Acts.	
	Hanwell Order 1896 Provisional Order to enable the Urban District Council of Hanwell to put in force the Compulsory Clauses of the Lands Clauses Acts.	
	Richmond (Surrey) Order 1896 Provisional Order to enable the Urban District Council for the Borough of Richmond (Surrey) to put in force the Compulsory Clauses of the Lands Clauses Acts.	
	Southall-Norwood Order 1896 Provisional Order to enable the Urban District Council of Southall-Norwood to put in force the Compulsory Clauses of the Lands Clauses Acts.	
	Stocksbridge Order 1896 Provisional Order to enable the Urban District Council of Stocksbridge to put in force the Compulsory Clauses of the Lands Clauses Acts.	
	Waltham Holy Cross Order 1896 Provisional Order to enable the Urban District Council of Waltham Holy Cross to put in force the Compulsory Clauses of the Lands Clauses Acts.	
	Woking Order 1896 Provisional Order to enable the Urban District Council of Woking to put in force the Compulsory Clauses of the Lands Clauses Acts.	
Local Government Board's Provisional Orders Confirmation (No. 7) Act 1896	59 & 60 Vict. c. cii	20 July 1896
An Act to confirm certain Provisional Orders of the Local Government Board relating to the Chorley Epsom-(Rural)-Sutton-Carshalton-and-Leatherhead Evesham Guildford-Godalming-and-Woking Havant Lanchester Liversedge-and-Mirfield and Luddenden Joint Hospital Districts.
	Chorley Joint Hospital Order 1896 Provisional Order for partially repealing and altering a Confirming Act.	
	Epsom (Rural), Sutton, Carshalton and Leatherhead Joint Hospital Order 1896 Provisional Order for partially repealing and altering a Confirming Act. (Note: Local Government Board's Provisional Orders Confirmation (No. 5) Act 1893 (56 & 57 Vict. c. cxvi))	
	Evesham Joint Hospital Order 1896 Provisional Order for partially repealing and altering Confirming Act. (Note: Local Government Board's Provisional Orders Confirmation (No. 3) Act 1883 (46 & 47 Vict. c. lxxxix))	
	Guildford, Godalming and Woking Joint Hospital Order 1896 Provisional Order for partially repealing and altering a Confirming Act.	
	Havant Joint Hospital Order 1896 Provisional Order for partially repealing and altering a Confirming Act.	
	Lanchester Joint Hospital Order 1896 Provisional Order for partially repealing and altering a Confirming Act. (Note: Local Government Board's Provisional Orders Confirmation (Cottingham, &c.) Act 1881 (44 & 45 Vict. c. lxx))	
	Liversedge and Mirfield Joint Hospital Order 1896 Provisional Order for partially repealing and altering a Confirming Act.	
	Luddenden Joint Hospital Order 1896 Provisional Order for partially repealing and altering a Confirming Act.	
Local Government Board's Provisional Orders Confirmation (No. 8) Act 1896	59 & 60 Vict. c. ciii	20 July 1896
An Act to confirm certain Provisional Orders of the Local Government Board relating to the Church-and-Clayton-le-Moors Clayton-le-Moors-and-Great-Harwood Conway-and-Colwyn-Bay Stourbridge Upper-Stour-Valley Whitchurch and Ystnidyfodwg-and-Pontypridd United Districts.
	Church and Clayton-le-Moors Joint Cemetery Order 1896 Provisional Order for altering a Confirming Act. (Note: Local Government Board's Provisional Orders Confirmation (No. 4) Act 1886 (49 & 50 Vict. c. lxi))	
	Clayton-le-Moors and Great Harwood Joint Sewerage Order 1896 Provisional Order for altering a Confirming Act.	
	Conway and Colwyn Bay Joint Water Supply Order 1896 Provisional Order for partially repealing and altering a Confirming Act. (Note: Local Government Board's Provisional Orders Confirmation (No. 14) Act 1891 (54 & 55 Vict. c. ccxi))	
	Stourbridge Main Drainage Order 1896 Provisional Order for altering a Confirming Act. (Note: Local Government Board's Provisional Orders Confirmation (Brentford Union, &c.) Act 1881 (44 & 45 Vict. c. lxiii))	
	Upper Stour Valley Main Sewerage Order 1896 Provisional Order for altering a Confirming Act.	
	Whitchurch Joint Cemetery Order 1896 Provisional Order for altering a Confirming Act.	
	Ystradyfodwg and Pontypridd Main Sewerage Order 1896 Provisional Order for altering a Confirming Act. (Note: Local Government Board's Provisional Orders Confirmation (No. 7) Act 1885 (48 & 49 Vict. c. cvii))	
Local Government Board's Provisional Orders Confirmation (No. 9) Act 1896	59 & 60 Vict. c. civ	20 July 1896
An Act to confirm certain Provisional Orders of the Local Government Board relating to the Bromley-and-Beckenham Calverley Dewsbury North Bierley Pontefract Rochester-and-Chatham Tamworth Thornton Warwick and Wirral Joint Hospital Districts.
	Bromley and Beckenham Joint Hospital Order 1896 Provisional Order for altering a Confirming Act.	
	Calverley Joint Hospital Order 1896 Provisional Order for altering a Confirming Act. (Note: Local Government Board's Provisional Orders Confirmation (No. 9) Act 1888 (51 & 52 Vict. c. cii))	
	Dewsbury Joint Hospital Order 1896 Provisional Order for partially repealing and altering a Confirming Act.	
	North Bierley Joint Hospital Order 1896 Provisional Order for altering a Confirming Act.	
	Pontefract Joint Hospital Order 1896 Provisional Order for partially repealing and altering a Confirming Act.	
	Rochester and Chatham Joint Hospital Order 1896 Provisional Order for altering a Confirming Act. (Note: Local Government Board's Provisional Orders Confirmation (Bethesda, &c.) Act 1880 (43 & 44 Vict. c. clxxviii))	
	Tamworth Joint Hospital Order 1896 Provisional Order for partially repealing and altering a Confirming Act.	
	Thornton Joint Hospital Order 1896 Provisional Order for altering a Confirming Act.	
	Warwick Joint Hospital Order 1896 Provisional Order for partially repealing and altering certain Confirming Acts. (Note: Local Government Board's Provisional Orders Confirmation (No. 4) Act 1884 (47 & 48 Vict. c. ccx))	
	Wirral Joint Hospital Order 1896 Provisional Order for altering a Confirming Act.	
Local Government Board's Provisional Orders Confirmation (No. 10) Act 1896	59 & 60 Vict. c. cv	20 July 1896
An Act to confirm certain Provisional Orders of the Local Government Board relating to Barnstaple Bournemouth (two) Devonport Oxford Prestwich Southport and Stapleton.
	Barnstaple Order 1896 Provisional Order for altering the mode of defraying the Expenses of an Urban District Council.	
	Bournemouth Order (No. 1) 1896 Provisional Order to enable the Urban District Council for the Borough of Bournemouth to put in force the Compulsory Clauses of the Lands Clauses Acts.	
	Bournemouth Order (No. 2) 1896 Provisional Order to enable the Urban District Council for the Borough of Bournemouth to put in force the Compulsory Clauses of the Lands Clauses Acts.	
	Devonport Order 1896 Provisional Order. to enable the Sanitary Authority for the Borough of Devonport to put in force the Compulsory Clauses of the Lands Clauses Acts.	
	Oxford Order 1896 Provisional Order for altering the Oxford Corporation Act 1890. (Note: Oxford Corporation Act 1890 (53 & 54 Vict. c. ccxxiii))	
	Prestwich Order 1896 Provisional Order to enable the Urban District Council of Prestwich to put in force the Compulsory Clauses of the Lands Clauses Acts.	
	Southport Order 1896 Provisional Order for partially repealing and altering the Southport Improvement Act 1871. (Note: Southport Improvement Act 1871 (34 & 35 Vict. c. cxl))	
	Stapleton Order 1896 Provisional Order to enable the Urban District Council of Stapleton to put in force the Compulsory Clauses of the Lands Clauses Acts.	
Local Government Board's Provisional Orders Confirmation (No. 11) Act 1896	59 & 60 Vict. c. cvi	20 July 1896
An Act to confirm certain Provisional Orders of the Local Government Board relating to the Oakwell Sandown-and-Shanklin Tiverton and Uxbridge Joint Hospital Districts.
	Oakwell Joint Hospital Order 1896 Provisional Order for forming a United District under Section 279 of the Public Health Act 1875. (Note: Public Health Act 1875 (38 & 39 Vict. c. 55))	
	Sandown and Shanklin Joint Hospital Order 1896 Provisional Order for forming a United District under Section 279 of the Public Health Act 1875.	
	Tiverton Joint Hospital Order 1896 Provisional Order for forming a United District under Section 279 of the Public Health Act 1875.	
	Uxbridge Joint Hospital Order 1896 Provisional Order for partially repealing and altering a Confirming Act. (Note: Local Government Board's Provisional Orders Confirmation (No. 3) Act 1882 (45 & 46 Vict. c. lxi))	
Local Government Board's Provisional Orders Confirmation (No. 12) Act 1896	59 & 60 Vict. c. cvii	20 July 1896
An Act to confirm certain Provisional Orders of the Local Government Board relating to the Accrington and Church Birmingham Tame and Rea Darenth Valley and Richmond (Surrey) United Districts.
	Accrington and Church Outfall Sewerage Order 1896 Provisional Order for altering a Confirming Act. (Note: Local Government Board's Provisional Orders Confirmation (No. 7) Act 1884 (47 & 48 Vict. c. ccxiv))	
	Birmingham Tame and Rea Main Sewerage Order 1896 Provisional Order for partially repealing and altering certain Confirming Acts.	
	Darenth Valley Main Sewerage Order 1896 Provisional Order for altering a Confirming Act. (Note: Local Government Board's Provisional Order Confirmation (Darenth Valley) Act 1878 (41 & 42 Vict. c. ccxi))	
	Richmond (Surrey) Main Sewerage Order 1896 Provisional Order for partially repealing and altering a Confirming Act. (Note: Local Government Board's Provisional Orders Confirmation (No. 5) Act 1887 (50 & 51 Vict. c. clxxix))	
Local Government Board's Provisional Orders Confirmation (No. 14) Act 1896	59 & 60 Vict. c. cviii	20 July 1896
An Act to confirm certain Provisional Orders of the Local Government Board relating to Aberavon Ashton-under-Lyne Derby Hexham and Stalybridge and to the Braintree and Keighley-and-Bingley Joint Hospital Districts.
	Aberavon Order 1896 Provisional Order for altering certain Local Acts and Confirming Acts.	
	Ashton-under-Lyne and Stalybridge Order 1896 Provisional Order for altering certain Local Acts and a Confirming Act	
	Derby Order 1896 Provisional Order for altering the Derby Corporation Act 1877. (Note: Derby Corporation Act 1877 (40 & 41 Vict. c. cxviii))	
	Hexham Order 1896 Provisional Order for altering the Hexham Local Board (Water) Act 1888. (Note: Hexham Local Board (Water) Act 1888 (51 & 52 Vict. c. cliv))	
	Braintree Joint Hospital Order 1896 Provisional Order for forming a United District under Section 279 of the Public Health Act 1875.	
	Keighley and Bingley Joint Hospital Order 1896 Provisional Order for altering a Confirming Act. (Note: Local Government Board's Provisional Orders Confirmation (No. 14) Act 1893 (56 & 57 Vict. c. cxxxi))	
Local Government Board's Provisional Orders Confirmation (No. 17) Act 1896	59 & 60 Vict. c. cix	20 July 1896
An Act to confirm certain Provisional Orders of the Local Government Board relating to the County of Hertford and the City of Liverpool (two).
	City of Liverpool Order (No. 1) 1896 Provisional Order for altering certain Local Acts.	
	County of Hertford (Additional Borrowing Powers) Order 1896 Provisional Order made in pursuance of sub-section (2) of Section 69 of the Local Government Act 1888.	
	City of Liverpool Order (No. 2) 1896 Provisional Order made in pursuance of Sections 59 and 87 of the Local Government Act 1888 for altering the City of Liverpool Order 1895.	
Local Government Board's Provisional Orders Confirmation (No. 18) Act 1896	59 & 60 Vict. c. cx	20 July 1896
An Act to confirm certain Provisional Orders of the Local Government Board relating to Batley Darlington Haverfordwest Lancaster Manchester and Mountain Ash.
	Batley Order 1896 Provisional Order for altering the Batley Corporation Waterworks Act 1878. (Note: Batley Corporation Waterworks Act 1878 (41 & 42 Vict. c. xxvii))	
	Darlington Order 1896 Provisional Order for altering the Darlington Extension and Improvement Act 1872. (Note: Darlington Extension and Improvement Act 1872 (35 & 36 Vict. c. cxii))	
	Haverfordwest Order 1896 Provisional Order for altering certain Local Acts and a Confirming Act. (Note: Local Government Board's Provisional Orders Confirmation (No. 3) Act 1885 (48 & 49 Vict. c. cvi))	
	Lancaster Order 1896 Provisional Order for altering the Lancaster Corporation Act 1888. (Note: Lancaster Corporation Act 1888 (51 & 52 Vict. c. clv))	
	Manchester Gas Order 1896 Provisional Order for altering certain Local Acts and a Confirming Act. (Note: Local Government Board's Provisional Orders Confirmation (No. 12) Act 1893 (56 & 57 Vict. c. cxxx))	
	Mountain Ash Order 1896 Provisional Order for altering certain Local Acts.	
Local Government Board's Provisional Orders Confirmation (No. 19) Act 1896	59 & 60 Vict. c. cxi	20 July 1896
An Act to confirm certain Provisional Orders of the Local Government Board relating to Burnley Leicester Oldham Wigan and Wolverhampton.
	Burnley Order 1896 Provisional Order for partially repealing and altering certain Local Acts and Confirming Acts.	
	Leicester Order 1896 Provisional Order for partially repealing and altering certain Local Acts.	
	Oldham Order 1896 Provisional Order for partially repealing and altering certain Local Acts.	
	Wigan Order 1896 Provisional Order for partially repealing and altering certain Local Acts.	
	Wolverhampton Order 1896 Provisional Order for partially repeating and altering certain Local Acts.	
Local Government Board's Provisional Orders Confirmation (Gas) Act 1896	59 & 60 Vict. c. cxii	20 July 1896
An Act to confirm certain Provisional Orders of the Local Government Board under the Gas and Water Works Facilities Act 1870 and the Public Health Act 1875 relating to Great Driffield Sandwich South Molton and Tiverton.
	Great Driffield Gas Order 1896 Provisional Order under the Gas and Water Works Facilities Act 1870.	
	Sandwich Corporation Gas Order 1896 Provisional Order under the Gas and Water Works Facilities Act 1870.	
	South Molton Gas 1896 Provisional Order under the Gas and Water Works Facilities Act 1870.	
	Tiverton Gas Order 1896 Provisional Order under the Gas and Water Works Facilities Act 1870.	
Local Government Board's Provisional Order Confirmation (Warrington) Act 1896 (repealed)	59 & 60 Vict. c. cxiii	20 July 1896
An Act to confirm a Provisional Order of the Local Government Board relating to Warrington. (Repealed by Cheshire County Council Act 1980 (c. xiii))
	Warrington (Extension) Order 1896 Provisional Order made in pursuance of Sections 54 and 59 of the Local Government Act 1888.	
Culter Water Order Confirmation Act 1896	59 & 60 Vict. c. cxiv	20 July 1896
An Act to confirm a Provisional Order under the Public Health (Scotland) Act 1867 and Acts amending the same relating to Culter Water.
	Culter Water Order 1896 Provisional Order.	
Dalmeny and Kirkliston Water Order Confirmation Act 1896	59 & 60 Vict. c. cxv	20 July 1896
An Act to confirm a Provisional Order under the Public Health (Scotland) Act 1867 and any Acts amending the same relating to Dalmeny and Kirkliston Water.
	Dalmeny and Kirkliston Water Order 1896 Provisional Order.	
Local Government Board (Ireland) Provisional Order Confirmation (No. 9) Act 1896	59 & 60 Vict. c. cxvi	20 July 1896
An Act to confirm a Provisional Order made by the Local Government Board for Ireland under the Public Health (Ireland) Act 1878 relating to the Rural Sanitary District of Larne.
	Larne Union (Carnlough Town) Waterworks Provisional Order 1896 Larne Union—Carnlough Waterworks. Provisional Order.	
Electric Lighting Orders Confirmation (No. 3) Act 1896	59 & 60 Vict. c. cxvii	20 July 1896
An Act to confirm certain Provisional Orders made by the Board of Trade under the Electric Lighting Acts 1882 and 1888 relating to Bray Cork Liverpool Queenstown Rathmines and Rathgar and Sale.
	Bray Township Electric Lighting Order 1896 Provisional Order granted by the Board of Trade under the Electric Lighting Acts 1882 and 1888 to the Commissioners of the Township of Bray in the Counties of Dublin and Wicklow.	
	Cork Electric Lighting Order 1896 Provisional Order granted by the Board of Trade under the Electric Lighting Acts 1882 and 1888 to the Mayor Aldermen and Citizens of the City of Cork in respect of the City or Borough of Cork.	
	Liverpool Electric Lighting Order 1896 Provisional Order granted by the Board of Trade under the Electric Lighting Acts 1882 and 1888 to the Corporation of Liverpool in respect of the City of Liverpool.	
	Queenstown Township Electric Lighting Order 1896 Provisional Order granted by the Board of Trade under the Electric Lighting Acts 1882 and 1888 to the Queenstown Town Commissioners in respect of the Township of Queenstown in the County of Cork.	
	Rathmines and Rathgar Township Electric Lighting Order 1896 Provisional Order granted by the Board of Trade under the Electric Lighting Acts 1882 and 1888 to the Rathmines and Rathgar Improvement Commissioners in respect of the Township of Rathmines and Rathgar in the County of Dublin.	
	Sale Electric Lighting Order 1896 Provisional Order granted by the Board of Trade under the Electric Lighting Acts 1882 and 1888 to the Sale Urban District Council in respect of the Urban District of Sale.	
Electric Lighting Orders Confirmation (No. 4) Act 1896	59 & 60 Vict. c. cxviii	20 July 1896
An Act to confirm certain Provisional Orders made by the Board of Trade under the Electric Lighting Acts 1882 and 1888 relating to Great Berkhamsted and Northchurch Great Crosby and Waterloo Margate and Pembroke Township.
	Great Berkhamsted and Northchurch Electric Lighting Order 1896 Provisional Order granted by the Board of Trade under the Electric Lighting Acts 1882 and 1888 to the Bedford Electric Light Company Limited in respect of the Parishes of Great Berkhamsted and Northchurch in the County of Hertford.	
	Great Crosby and Waterloo Electric Lighting Order 1896 Provisional Order granted by the Board of Trade under the Electric Lighting Acts 1882 and 1888 to the Liverpool District Lighting Company Limited in respect of the districts of the District Councils for Great Crosby and Waterloo-with-Seaforth in the County of Lancaster.	
	Margate Corporation Electric Lighting Order 1896 Provisiondl Order granted by the Board of Trade under the Electric Lighting Acts 1882 and 1888 to the Mayor Aldermen and Burgesses of the Borough of Margate in respect of the said Borough.	
	Pembroke Township Electric Lighting Order 1896 Provisional Order granted by the Board of Trade under the Electric Lighting Acts 1882 and 1888 to the Pembroke Township Commissioners in respect of the Pembroke Township in the County of Dublin.	
Electric Lighting Orders Confirmation (No. 5) Act 1896	59 & 60 Vict. c. cxix	20 July 1896
An Act to confirm certain Provisional Orders made by the Board of Trade under the Electric Lighting Acts 1882 and 1888 relating to Battersea Camberwell and St. Saviour's District.
	Battersea Electric Lighting Order 1896 Provisional Order granted by the Board of Trade under the Electric Lighting Acts 1882 and 1888 to the Vestry of the Parish of St. Mary Battersea in the County of London in respect of the Parish of Saint Mary Battersea aforesaid.	
	Camberwell Electric Lighting Order 1896 Provisional Order granted by the Board of Trade under the Electric Lighting Acts 1882 and 1888 to the County of London and Brush Provincial Electric Lighting Company Limited in respect of the Parish of St. Giles Camberwell in the County of London.	
	St. Saviour's District Electric Lighting Order 1896 Provisional Order granted by the Board of Trade under the Electric Lighting Acts 1882 and 1888 to the County of London and Brush Provincial Electric Lighting Company Limited in respect of portion of the District of the St. Saviour's District Board of Works.	
Tramways Orders Confirmation (No. 1) Act 1896	59 & 60 Vict. c. cxx	20 July 1896
An Act to confirm certain Provisional Orders made by the Board of Trade under the Tramways Act 1870 (Note: Tramways Act 1870 (33 & 34 Vict. c. 78)) relating to Aberdeen District Tramways Blackpool Corporation Tramways Bristol Tramways Dover Corporation Tramways Hull Corporation Tramways Manchester Corporation Tramways and Plymouth Corporation Tramways.
	Aberdeen District Tramways Order 1896 Order authorising the Aberdeen District Tramways Company to construct additional Tramways in the City and Royal Burgh of Aberdeen.	
	Blackpool Corporation Tramways Order 1896 Order authorising the Mayor Aldermen and Burgesses of the Borough of Blackpool to construct additional Tramways in the said Borough.	
	Bristol Tramways Order 1896 Order authorising the Bristol Tramways and Carriage Company Limited to make additional Tramways in the City and County of Bristol and in the Urban District of Kingswood in the County of Gloucester and for other purposes.	
	Dover Corporation Tramways Order 1896 Order authorising the Mayor Aldermen and Burgesses of the Borough of Dover to construct Tramways in the said Borough.	
	Hull Corporation Tramways Order 1896 Order authorising the Mayor Aldermen and Burgesses of Kingston-upon-Hull to construct Tramways in the County Borough and Town and County of the Town of Kingston-upon-Hull.	
	Manchester Corporation Tramways Order 1896 Order authorising the Mayor Aldermen and Citizens of the City of Manchester in the County of Lancaster to construct additional Tramways in the said City.	
	Plymouth Corporation Tramways Order 1896 Order authorising the Mayor Aldermen and Burgesses of the Borough of Plymouth to construct additional Tramways in the said Borough and for other purposes.	
Pier and Harbour Orders Confirmation (No. 4) Act 1896	59 & 60 Vict. c. cxxi	20 July 1896
An Act to confirm certain Provisional Orders made by the Board of Trade under the General Pier and Harbour Act 1861 relating to Dunoon Helensburgh and Killybegs.
	Dunoon Burgh Pier Order 1896 Order for the construction of additional Works at Dunoon Burgh Pier in the County of Argyll and for other purposes.	
	Helensburgh Harbour Order 1896 Order for amending an Act passed in the ninth year of the reign of Her Majesty (Note: Helensburgh Harbour Act 1846 (9 & 10 Vict. c. xvi)) relating to the Port and Harbour of Helensburgh in the County of Dumbarton for the construction of New Works and other purposes.	
	Killybegs Pier and Harbour Order 1896 Order for appointing and incorporating Commissioners for the Harbour of Killybegs in the county of Donegal and vesting the pier and harbour in them and for the construction of works and the improvement maintenance and regulation of the harbour.	
Military Lands Provisional Orders Confirmation Act 1896	59 & 60 Vict. c. cxxii	20 July 1896
An Act to confirm certain Provisional Orders of the Secretary of State under the Military Lands Act 1892. (Note: Military Lands Act 1892 (55 & 56 Vict. c. 43))
	Crowden Rifle Ranges Order 1896 A Provisional Order made in pursuance of Section Two of the Military Lands Act 1892 authorising the purchase by the 5th Ardwick Volunteer Battalion Manchester Regiment of land for the provision of rifle ranges.	
	Diggle Rifle Ranges Order 1896 A Provisional Order made in pursuance of Section Two of the Military Lands Act 1892 authorising the purchase by the Second and Sixth Volunteer Battalions Manchester Regiment of land for the provision of rifle ranges.	
Matlock Bath Gas Act 1896 (repealed)	59 & 60 Vict. c. cxxiii	20 July 1896
An Act to authorise the Matlock Bath and Scarthin Nick Urban District Council to supply Gas and to provide for the transfer of the undertaking of the Matlock Bath Gaslight and Coke Company limited to the said Council and for other purposes. (Repealed by Matlocks Urban District Council Act 1927 (17 & 18 Geo. 5. c. xvii))
Falmouth Rectory Act 1896	59 & 60 Vict. c. cxxiv	20 July 1896
An Act to provide for the collection and appropriation of the Falmouth Rector's Rate and the eventual suspension or abolition of the same and for annexing to the See of Truro the advowson of the Rectory of Falmouth and for other purposes.
Waterford Corporation Act 1896	59 & 60 Vict. c. cxxv	20 July 1896
An Act to extend the Boundaries of the Borough of Waterford to transfer to the Corporation the powers for fiscal purposes of the Grand Jury of the County of the City of Waterford to make further provision as to buildings streets and sanitary matters and for other purposes.
South Eastern Railway Act 1896	59 & 60 Vict. c. cxxvi	20 July 1896
An Act for conferring further powers on the South Eastern Railway Company and to make further provision with respect to their own undertaking and other undertakings in which they are interested and for other purposes.
East Surrey Water Act 1896	59 & 60 Vict. c. cxxvii	20 July 1896
An Act to authorise the transfer of certain Waterworks to the East Surrey Water Company and to extend the limits of supply of and confer further powers upon that Company and for other purposes.
London, Brighton and South Coast Railway Act 1896	59 & 60 Vict. c. cxxviii	20 July 1896
An Act to confer further powers on the London Brighton and South Coast and London and South Western Railway Companies to authorise certain alterations of the Chipstead Valley Railway and for other purposes.
Blackpool, St. Anne's and Lytham Tramways Act 1896 (repealed)	59 & 60 Vict. c. cxxix	20 July 1896
An Act to revive the powers and extend the period for construction of the Blackpool Saint Anne's and Lytham Tramways in the County Palatine of Lancaster and for other purposes. (Repealed by Lytham St. Anne's Corporation Act 1923 (13 & 14 Geo. 5. c. lxxxvi))
Blackpool Improvement Act 1896 (repealed)	59 & 60 Vict. c. cxxx	20 July 1896
An Act to alter the North Shore Works authorised to be constructed by the Blackpool Improvement Act 1893 (Note: Blackpool Improvement Act 1893 (56 & 57 Vict. c. lxxxvi)) and for other purposes. (Repealed by County of Lancashire Act 1984 (c. xxi))
Foyle College Act 1896 (repealed)	59 & 60 Vict. c. cxxxi	20 July 1896
An Act for the amalgamation of Foyle College and the Londonderry Academical Institution. (Repealed by Foyle and Londonderry College Act 1976 (c. xviii))
Newcastle-upon-Tyne and Gateshead Gas Act 1896	59 & 60 Vict. c. cxxxii	20 July 1896
An Act to empower the Newcastle-upon-Tyne and Gateshead Gas Company to purchase additional lands to make additional works and to raise additional capital and for other purposes
Kirkcaldy and Dysart Waterworks Act 1896 (repealed)	59 & 60 Vict. c. cxxxiii	20 July 1896
An Act to authorise the Waterworks Commissioners of Kirkcaldy and Dysart to make and maintain additional works for providing an increased Water Supply and for other purposes. (Repealed by Kirkcaldy Corporation Order Confirmation Act 1939 (2 & 3 Geo. 6. c. vi))
Lancashire and Yorkshire and London and North Western Railways Act 1896	59 & 60 Vict. c. cxxxiv	20 July 1896
An Act for conferring further powers upon the Lancashire and Yorkshire Railway Company and the London and North Western Railway Company with regard to their respective undertakings and with regard to the North Union Preston and Longridge and Preston and Wyre Undertakings of those Companies and for other purposes.
Borough of Portsmouth Waterworks Act 1896	59 & 60 Vict. c. cxxxv	20 July 1896
An Act to confer further powers upon the Borough of Portsmouth Waterworks Company as to the construction of works and for other purposes.
Sheffield Corporation Tramways Act 1896 (repealed)	59 & 60 Vict. c. cxxxvi	20 July 1896
An Act to empower the Mayor Aldermen and Citizens of the City of Sheffield to work and use their Sheffield Tramways Undertaking. (Repealed by Sheffield Corporation (Consolidation) Act 1918 (8 & 9 Geo. 5. c. lxi))
Brighton Corporation Water Act 1896	59 & 60 Vict. c. cxxxvii	20 July 1896
An Act to authorise the transfer of the undertaking of the Shoreham and District Waterworks Company to and to confer further powers upon the Mayor Aldermen and Burgesses of the Borough of Brighton and for other purposes.
Great Northern Railway Act 1896	59 & 60 Vict. c. cxxxviii	20 July 1896
An Act to confer further powers upon the Great Northern Railway Company to empower the Great Eastern Railway Company to grant a further lease of their Ramsey Railway to that Company to vest in the Great Northern and Great Eastern Joint Committee the undertaking of the Ramsey and Somersham Junction Railway Company and for other purposes.
Lancashire and Yorkshire Railway Act 1896	59 & 60 Vict. c. cxxxix	20 July 1896
An Act for conferring further powers on the Lancashire and Yorkshire Railway Company and for other purposes.
North British Railway Act 1896	59 & 60 Vict. c. cxl	20 July 1896
An Act to authorise the North British Railway Company to acquire additional lands to extend the time limited by certain Acts for the compulsory purchase of lands and completion of works to legalise and sanction a widening of a portion of the Forth and Clyde Junction Railway near Buchlyvie Station to authorise the said Company to raise further capital and for other purposes.
Swansea Harbour Act 1896	59 & 60 Vict. c. cxli	20 July 1896
An Act to authorise the Swansea Harbour Trustees to make a new entrance to the half-tide Basin of the Town Float to construct a Lock to form a new entrance to the half-tide Basin of the South Dock a Railway and other works to borrow further money and for other purposes.
Leamington Corporation Act 1896 (repealed)	59 & 60 Vict. c. cxlii	20 July 1896
An Act to make further and better provision in regard to the health local government and improvement of the Borough of Royal Leamington Spa and for other purposes. (Repealed by Warwick District Council Act 1984 (c. xxiv))
Freshwater, Yarmouth and Newport Railway Act 1896	59 & 60 Vict. c. cxliii	20 July 1896
An Act to reconstitute the Board of Directors of the Freshwater Yarmouth and Newport Railway Company for raising further moneys and for other purposes.
Great Western Railway (Denbighshire Railways) Act 1896	59 & 60 Vict. c. cxliv	20 July 1896
An Act to empower the Great Western Railway Company to make new Railways in the county of Denbigh and to authorise Agreements between that Company and the Shropshire Union Railways and Canal Company and the London and North Western Railway Company and for other purposes.
Port Talbot Railway and Docks (Ogmore Valleys Extension) Act 1896	59 & 60 Vict. c. cxlv	20 July 1896
An Act to enable the Port Talbot Railway and Docks Company to construct new Railways and works in the Ogmore Valleys in the county of Glamorgan to acquire the Morfa Railway and the Cefn and Pyle Railway and for other purposes.
Belfast Street Tramways Act 1896	59 & 60 Vict. c. cxlvi	20 July 1896
An Act to confer further powers upon the Belfast Street Tramways Company and for other purposes.
Blackpool and Fleetwood Tramroad Act 1896 (repealed)	59 & 60 Vict. c. cxlvii	20 July 1896
An Act for incorporating the Blackpool and Fleetwood Tramroads Company and empowering them to construct a Tramroad and Tramway between Blackpool and Fleetwood and for other purposes. (Repealed by County of Lancashire Act 1984 (c. xxi))
Burton-upon-Trent Corporation Act 1896	59 & 60 Vict. c. cxlviii	20 July 1896
An Act to transfer Burton Bridge to the Mayor Aldermen and Burgesses of the Borough of Burton-upon-Trent in the County of Stafford to enable them to widen Little Burton Bridge to make further provision for the good government of the Borough and for other purposes.
London and North Western Railway Act 1896	59 & 60 Vict. c. cxlix	20 July 1896
An Act for conferring further powers upon the London and North Western Railway Company in relation to their own undertaking and other undertakings in which they are interested jointly with other Companies and also for conferring powers upon the Great Western Railway Company and the Shropshire Union Railways and Canal Company and for other purposes.
North Wales Counties Lunatic Asylum (Water Supply) Act 1896	59 & 60 Vict. c. cl	20 July 1896
An Act for empowering the Visiting Committee of the North Wales Counties Lunatic Asylum to execute works for supplying the said Asylum with water and for other purposes.
Portsmouth Street Tramways Act 1896	59 & 60 Vict. c. cli	20 July 1896
An Act to confer further powers upon the Portsmouth Street Tramways Company and for other purposes.
Yeovil Corporation Waterworks Act 1896	59 & 60 Vict. c. clii	20 July 1896
An Act to enable the Corporation of Yeovil to construct an additional Reservoir and other waterworks and to raise money for the purpose by borrowing on mortgage or otherwise.
Weaver Navigation Act 1896	59 & 60 Vict. c. cliii	20 July 1896
An Act to extend the time for the compulsory purchase of lands and completion of Works authorised by the Weaver Navigation Act 1893 (Note: Weaver Navigation Act 1893 (56 & 57 Vict. c. clxix)) and for other purposes.
Ribble Navigation Act 1896 (repealed)	59 & 60 Vict. c. cliv	20 July 1896
An Act to enable the Mayor Aldermen and Burgesses of the Borough of Preston to construct further works to borrow additional moneys for the purposes of the Ribble Navigation and Preston Dock Undertaking and for other purposes. (Repealed by Preston Borough Council Act 1981 (c. xxii))
Burntisland Harbour Act 1896 (repealed)	59 & 60 Vict. c. clv	20 July 1896
An Act to authorise the Burntisland Harbour Commissioners to construct a Wet Dock and other works to provide for an alteration of the constitution of the Commissioners and to confer on the Commissioners the North British Railway Company and the Magistrates and Town Council of Burntisland further powers with reference to the Harbour and for other purposes. (Repealed by Forth Ports Authority Order Confirmation Act 1969 (c. xxxiv))
North Cornwall Railway Act 1896	59 & 60 Vict. c. clvi	20 July 1896
An Act to confer further powers on the North Cornwall Railway Company.
Metropolitan District Railway Act 1896	59 & 60 Vict. c. clvii	20 July 1896
An Act to confer further powers on the Metropolitan District Railway Company and for other purposes.
London Sea Water Supply Act 1896	59 & 60 Vict. c. clviii	20 July 1896
An Act for authorising the construction of works for supplying Sea Water to certain parts of London and other places and for other purposes.
North Eastern Railway Act 1896	59 & 60 Vict. c. clix	20 July 1896
An Act to confer additional powers upon the North Eastern Railway Company for the construction of works and the acquisition of additional lands and for other purposes.
Caledonian Railway Act 1896 or the Mid-Lanarkshire Extension Lines Act 1896	59 & 60 Vict. c. clx	20 July 1896
An Act to confer further powers on the Caledonian Railway Company in relation to their undertaking to confer running powers and facilities on the Caledonian Railway Company and the Glasgow and South Western Railway Company over certain Railways of those Companies respectively to extend the time for the sale of superfluous lands of the Cathcart District Railway Company to revive and extend the time for the purchase of lands for and for the completion of certain Railways and works of the Caledonian Railway Company and the Railways and works authorised by the Dumbarton and Balloch Joint Line &c. Act 1892 (Note: Dumbarton and Balloch Joint Line, &c. Act 1892 (55 & 56 Vict. c. clxx)) and for other purposes.
Water Orders Confirmation Act 1896	59 & 60 Vict. c. clxi	7 August 1896
An Act to confirm certain Provisional Orders made by the Board of Trade under the Gas and Water Works Facilities Act 1870 relating to Amersham Beaconsfield and District Water Burnham and District Water East Huntingdonshire Water Hemel Hempstead Water Maidstone Water and Tilehurst Pangbourne and District Water.
	Amersham, Beaconsfield and District Water Order 1896 Order empowering the Amersham Beaconsfield and District Waterworks Company Limited to construct and maintain Waterworks and to supply Water within the Parishes of Amersham Coleshill Beaconsfield Chesham Bois Chalfont St. Giles Chenies Seer Green and Penn all in the County of Buckingham.	
	Burnham and District Water Order 1896 Order empowering the Burnham Dorney and Hitcham Waterworks Company Limited to maintain and continue Waterworks and to supply Water in the Parishes of Burnham and Hitcham and part of the Parish of Farnham Royal in the County of Buckingham.	
	East Huntingdonshire Water Order 1896 Order empowering the East Huntingdonshire Water Company to raise additional Capital.	
	Hemel Hempstead Water Order 1896 Order authorising the Hemel Hempstead Waterworks and Laundry Company Limited to maintain and continue Waterworks and to construct additional Waterworks and to supply Water in and to the Parish of Hemel Hempstead and part of the Parishes of Saint Michaels and Abbots Langley in the County of Hertford.	
	Maidstone Water Order 1896 Order empowering the Maidstone Waterworks Company to raise Additional Capital.	
	Tilehurst, Pangbourne and District Water Order 1896 Order empowering the Tilehurst Pangbourne and District Water Company Limited to extend their Limits of Supply and to raise additional Capital.	
Local Government Board (Ireland) Provisional Order Confirmation (No. 2) Act 1896 (repealed)	59 & 60 Vict. c. clxii	7 August 1896
An Act to confirm a Provisional Order made by the Local Government Board for Ireland under the Public Health (Ireland) Act 1878 relating to the Urban Sanitary District of Armagh. (Repealed by Local Government Board (Ireland) Provisional Orders Confirmation (No. 2) Act 1898 (61 & 62 Vict. c. xlii))
	Armagh Sewerage Provisional Order 1896 Armagh Sewerage Works. Provisional Order.	
Local Government Board (Ireland) Provisional Order Confirmation (No. 11) Act 1896	59 & 60 Vict. c. clxiii	7 August 1896
An Act to confirm a Provisional Order made by the Local Government Board for Ireland under the Public Health (Ireland) Act 1878 relating to the Rural Sanitary District of Listowel.
	Glin District School (Waterworks) Provisional Order 1896 Glin District School Waterworks. Provisional Order.	
Education Department Provisional Orders Confirmation (Acton, &c.) Act 1896	59 & 60 Vict. c. clxiv	7 August 1896
An Act to confirm certain Provisional Orders made by the Education Department under the Elementary Education Acts 1870 to 1893 to enable the School Boards for Acton Brighton-and-Preston United District Chiswick Linthwaite Swansea United District and Willesden to put in force the Lands Clauses Acts.
	Acton (Middlesex) School Board Order 1896 Provisional Order for putting in force the Lands Clauses Acts.	
	Brighton and Preston (Sussex) School Board Order 1896 Provisional Order for putting in force the Lands Clauses Acts.	
	Chiswick (Middlesex) School Board Order 1896 Provisional Order for putting in force the Lands Clauses Acts.	
	Linthwaite (Yorks. West Riding) School Board Order 1896 Provisional Order for putting in force the Lands Clauses Acts.	
	Swansea (Glamorgan) School Board Order 1896 Provisional Order for putting in force the Lands Clauses Acts.	
	Willesden (Middlesex) School Board Order 1896 Provisional Order for putting in force the Lands Clauses Acts.	
Railway Rates and Charges (Lee-on-the-Solent Railway, &c.) Order Confirmation Act 1896 (repealed)	59 & 60 Vict. c. clxv	7 August 1896
An Act to confirm a Provisional Order made by the Board of Trade under the Railway and Canal Traffic Act 1888 relating to the Classification of Merchandise Traffic and the Schedule of Maximum Rates and Charges of the Lee-on-the-Solent Light Railway Company the Liverpool St. Helens and South Lancashire Railway Company the Wrexham and Ellesmere Railway Company and the Donoughmore Extension Light Railway Company Limited. (Repealed by Statute Law (Repeals) Act 2013 (c. 2))
	Railway Rates and Charges (Lee-on-the-Solent Railway, &c.) Order 1896 Order of the Board of Trade under the Railway and Canal Traffic Act 1888 fixing the classification of merchandise and the schedule of maximum rates and charges including all terminal charges applicable to the said classification of the Lee-on-the-Solent Light Railway Company (Note: Lee-on-the-Solent Light Railway) the Liverpool St. Helens and South Lancashire Railway Company (Note: Liverpool, St Helens and South Lancashire Railway) the Wrexham and Ellesmere Railway Company (Note: Wrexham and Ellesmere Railway) and the Donoughmore Extension Light Railway Company Limited. (Note: Donoughmore Extension Light Railway)	
Tramways Orders Confirmation (No. 2) Act 1896	59 & 60 Vict. c. clxvi	7 August 1896
An Act to confirm certain Provisional Orders made by the Board of Trade under the Tramways Act 1870 relating to Blyth and Cowpen Tramways Oldham Ashton-under-Lyne Hyde and District Electric Tramways Potteries Extension Tramways and Swansea (Constitution Hill) Tramway.
	Blyth and Cowpen Tramways Order 1896 Order authorising George Washington Smiley to construct Tramways in the Township of Cowpen in the Parish of Woodhorn in the County of Northumberland and for other purposes.	
	Oldham, Ashton-under-Lyne, Hyde and District Electric Tramways Order 1896 Order authorising the construction of tramways in the Borough of Ashton-under-Lyne in the County of Lancaster and of Hyde in the County of Chester and the Urban Districts of Denton and Audenshaw and the Rural District of Limehurst and the Districts of the Parish Councils of Waterloo and Bardsley all in the County of Lancaster.	
	Potteries Extension Tramways Order 1896 Order Authorising the Construction of Street Tramways in the Potteries District.	
	Swansea (Constitution Hill) Tramway Order 1896 Order authorising the construction of a Tramway on Constitution Hill in the Borough of Swansea.	
Local Government Board's Provisional Orders Confirmation (No. 2) Act 1896	59 & 60 Vict. c. clxvii	7 August 1896
An Act to confirm certain Provisional Orders of the Local Government Board relating to Abergele and Pensarn Bridgnorth Caerphilly Knighton Litherland Swansea and Teignmouth.
	Abergele and Pensarn, &c. Order 1896 Provisional Order for partially repealing certain Confirming Acts.	
	Caerphilly Order 1896 Provisional Order to enable the Urban District Council of Caerphilly to put in force the Compulsory Clauses of the Lands Clauses Acts.	
	Teignmouth Order 1896 Provisional Order to enable the Urban District Council of Teignmouth to put in force the Compulsory Clauses of the Lands Clauses Acts.	
Local Government Board's Provisional Orders Confirmation (No. 16) Act 1896	59 & 60 Vict. c. clxviii	7 August 1896
An Act to confirm certain Provisional Orders of the Local Government Board relating to the Urban District of Blackpool and the Rural Districts of Chelmsford Hartley and South Mimms.
	Blackpool Order 1896 Provisional Order to enable the Urban District Council for the Borough of Blackpool to put in force the Compulsory Clauses of the Lands Clauses Acts.	
	Chelmsford Rural Order 1896 Provisional Order to enable the Rural District Council of Chelmsford to put in force the Compulsory Clauses of the Lands Clauses Acts.	
	Martley Rural Order 1896 Provisional Order to enable the Rural District Council of Martley to put in force the Compulsory Clauses of the Lands Clauses Acts.	
	South Mimms Rural Order 1896 Provisional Order to enable the Rural District Council of South Mimms to put in force the Compulsory Clauses of the Lands Clauses Acts.	
Local Government Board's Provisional Orders Confirmation (No. 20) Act 1896	59 & 60 Vict. c. clxix	7 August 1896
An Act to confirm certain Provisional Orders of the Local Government Board relating to Cheltenham Shrewsbury and Warrington.
	Cheltenham Order 1896 Provisional Order for partially repealing and altering certain Local Acts.	
	Shrewsbury Order 1896 Provisional Order for partially repealing and altering the Shrewsbury Waterworks Act 1856. (Note: Shrewsbury Waterworks Act 1856 (19 & 20 Vict. c. xlii))	
	Warrington Order 1896 Provisional Order for partially repealing and altering certain Local Acts.	
Local Government Board's Provisional Order Confirmation (No. 11) Act 1896 (repealed)	59 & 60 Vict. c. clxx	7 August 1896
An Act to confirm a Provisional Order of the Local Government Board relating to Wolverhampton. (Repealed by Wolverhampton Corporation Act 1969 (c. lx))
	Wolverhampton Order 1896 (No. 2) Provisional Order for altering the Wolverhampton Improvement Act 1869. (Note: Wolverhampton Improvement Act 1869 (32 & 33 Vict. c. cxxxi))	
Local Government Board's Provisional Order Confirmation (No. 22) Act 1896	59 & 60 Vict. c. clxxi	7 August 1896
An Act to confirm a Provisional Order of the Local Government Board relating to Nottingham.
	Nottingham Order 1896 Provisional Order for altering certain Local Acts.	
Local Government Board's Provisional Order Confirmation (No. 24) Act 1896 (repealed)	59 & 60 Vict. c. clxxii	7 August 1896
An Act to confirm a Provisional Order of the Local Government Board relating to the Borough of Longton. (Repealed by Staffordshire Act 1983 (c. xviii))
	Longton Order 1896 Provisional Order to enable the Urban District Council for the Borough of Longton to put in force the Compulsory Clauses of the Lands Clauses Acts.	
Education Department Provisional Order Confirmation (London) Act 1896	59 & 60 Vict. c. clxxiii	7 August 1896
An Act to confirm a Provisional Order made by the Education Department under the Elementary Education Act 1870 to enable the School Board for London to put in force the Lands Clauses Acts.
	London School Board Order 1896 Provisional Order for putting in force the Lands Clauses Acts.	
Commons Regulation (Darwen) Provisional Order Confirmation Act 1896	59 & 60 Vict. c. clxxiv	7 August 1896
An Act to confirm a Provisional Order of the Board of Agriculture relating to the Regulation of Darwen Moor in the Borough of Darwen.
	Darwen Moor Order 1896 Provisional Order for the Regulation of Darwen Moor.	
Electric Lighting Orders Confirmation (No. 7) Act 1896	59 & 60 Vict. c. clxxv	7 August 1896
An Act to confirm certain Provisional Orders made by the Board of Trade under the Electric Lighting Acts 1882 and 1888 relating to Allerton Little Woolton Much Woolton Childwall and Garston Bath and Merthyr Tydfil.
	Allerton, Woolton, Childwall and Garston Electric Lighting Order 1896 Provisional Order granted by the Board of Trade under the Electric Lighting Acts 1882 and 1888 to the Liverpool District Lighting Company Limited in respect of the Districts of the respective District Councils of Allerton Little Woolton Much Woolton Childwall and Garston in the County of Lancaster.	
	Bath Electric Lighting Order 1896 Provisional Order granted by the Board of Trade under the Electric Lighting Acts 1882 and 1888 to the Mayor Aldermen and Citizens of the City of Bath in respect of the City of Bath in the County of Somerset.	
	Merthyr Tydfil Electric Lighting Order 1896 Provisional Order granted by the Board of Trade under the Electric Lighting Acts 1882 and 1888 to J. C. Howell Limited in respect of the Urban District of Merthyr Tydfil.	
Pier and Harbour Orders Confirmation (No. 3) Act 1896	59 & 60 Vict. c. clxxvi	7 August 1896
An Act to confirm certain Provisional Orders made by the Board of Trade under the General Pier and Harbour Act 1861 relating to New Ross and Weston-super-Mare.
	New Ross Port and Harbour Order 1896 Order for amending the New Ross Port and Harbour Amendment Act 1861 (Note: New Ross Port and Harbour Amendment Act 1861 (24 & 25 Vict. c. cxl)) and for other purposes.	
	Weston-super-Mare Pier Order 1896 Order for authorising the Weston-super-Mare Pier Company to construct a new Pier to extend their Landing Stage and for other purposes.	
Pier and Harbour Orders Confirmation (No. 5) Act 1896	59 & 60 Vict. c. clxxvii	7 August 1896
An Act to confirm certain Provisional Orders made by the Board of Trade under the General Pier and Harbour Act 1861 relating to Emsworth and Oban.
	Emsworth Harbour Order 1896 Order for the management and improvement of the Harbour of Emsworth in the Counties of Southampton and Sussex.	
	Oban Harbour Order 1896 Order for the improvement maintenance and regulation of the South Pier or Quay at Oban in the County of Argyll and for vesting the same and also the North Pier at Oban in the Commissioners of the Burgh of Oban for the construction of new Works and for other purposes.	
Aldershot Gas and Water Act 1896	59 & 60 Vict. c. clxxviii	7 August 1896
An Act for conferring further powers on the Aldershot Gas and Water Company for the construction of a Tramroad and the acquisition of lands for that purpose the defining and extending their limits of Water Supply also empowering the Company to enter into an agreement with the North Camp and Farnborough District Gas Company Limited the raising of additional capital and for other purposes.
Kilmarnock Corporation Water Act 1896	59 & 60 Vict. c. clxxix	7 August 1896
An Act to confer further borrowing powers on the Provost Magistrates and Town Council of the Burgh of Kilmarnock in respect of their Water Undertaking.
Ogilvie Meal Charity Act 1896	59 & 60 Vict. c. clxxx	7 August 1896
An Act to enlarge and alter the scope of the Meal Charity created by the Trust Disposition and Settlement of John Ogilvie for the benefit of the Poor of the Parishes of Airth and Bothkennar in the County of Stirling and for other purposes.
Kensington (James Street Area) Improvements Act 1896	59 & 60 Vict. c. clxxxi	7 August 1896
An Act to authorise the construction of certain Street Improvements and the taking of lands in the Parish of Saint Mary Abbotts Kensington in the County of London and for other purposes.
Manchester Ship Canal Act 1896	59 & 60 Vict. c. clxxxii	7 August 1896
An Act to enable the Manchester Ship Canal Company to alter certain works authorised by the Manchester Ship Canal Act 1885 (Note: Manchester Ship Canal Act 1885 (48 & 49 Vict. c. clxxxviii)) and the Manchester Ship Canal (Tidal Openings &c.) Act 1890 (Note: Manchester Ship Canal (Tidal Openings, &c.) Act 1890 (53 & 54 Vict. c. lxxiv)) to make a Railway at Salford and other works to amend the former Acts of the Company and for other purposes.
Midland Railway Act 1896	59 & 60 Vict. c. clxxxiii	7 August 1896
An Act to empower the Midland Railway Company to construct a Harbour at Heysham in Morecambe Bay to confer additional powers upon the Midland Railway Company and the Midland and Great Northern Railways Joint Committee for the construction of works and the acquisition of lands and for other purposes.
North Metropolitan Railway and Canal Act 1896	59 & 60 Vict. c. clxxxiv	7 August 1896
An Act to authorise the North Metropolitan Railway and Canal Company to make alterations and improvements in their Canal and for other purposes.
City of Glasgow Union Railway Partition Act 1896	59 & 60 Vict. c. clxxxv	7 August 1896
An Act to provide for the partition between the Glasgow and South Western Railway Company and the North British Railway Company of the undertaking of the City of Glasgow Union Railway Company and for other purposes.
Llanelly Harbour Act 1896	59 & 60 Vict. c. clxxxvi	7 August 1896
An Act to empower the Llanelly Harbour and Burry Navigation Commissioners to construct a Dock and new Cut for the River Lliedi and other works for the improvement of the Port and Harbour of Llanelly and to borrow moneys with the consent of the Urban District Council of Llanelly and for other purposes.
Eastbourne Waterworks Act 1896	59 & 60 Vict. c. clxxxvii	7 August 1896
An Act for extending the limits of supply of the Eastbourne Waterworks Company and for conferring further powers on the Company for the construction of works the raising of capital and otherwise in relation to their undertaking.
London County Council (General Powers) Act 1896 (repealed)	59 & 60 Vict. c. clxxxviii	7 August 1896
An Act to empower the London County Council to purchase lands for various purposes to extend the time for purchase of lands at York Water Gate to confer further powers on the Council with respect to main roads to confer further powers on Vestries and District Boards of Works and for other purposes. (Repealed by Local Law (Greater London Council and Inner London Boroughs) Order 1965 (SI 1965/540))
London Tramways Company Act 1896	59 & 60 Vict. c. clxxxix	7 August 1896
An Act to authorise the London Tramways Company (Limited) to construct additional Tramways and for other purposes.
Sheffield Corporation Water Act 1896 (repealed)	59 & 60 Vict. c. cxc	7 August 1896
An Act to empower the Corporation of Sheffield to construct Works for impounding the waters of the River Porter or Little Don and its tributaries and to supply water to the Corporations of Rotherham and Doncaster and to acquire the Water Undertaking of the Stocksbridge Urban District Council and for other purposes. (Repealed by Statute Law (Repeals) Act 1989 (c. 43))
Callander and Oban Railway Act 1896	59 & 60 Vict. c. cxci	7 August 1896
An Act to empower the Callander and Oban Railway Company to extend their Railway from Connel Fernr to Ballachulish and for other purposes.
Alexandra (Newport and South Wales) Docks and Railways Act 1896	59 & 60 Vict. c. cxcii	7 August 1896
An Act to make amendments in the Acts of the Alexandra (Newport and South Wales) Docks and Railway Company with respect (among other matters) to the reverter in certain events of lands to Lord Tredegar and for other purposes.
Barry Railway Act 1896 (repealed)	59 & 60 Vict. c. cxciii	7 August 1896
An Act to enable the Barry Railway Company to construct new Railways and to exercise certain running powers and for other purposes. (Repealed by Vale of Glamorgan (Barry Harbour) Act 1978 (c. xvii))
Easton and Church Hope Railway (Extension of Time) Act 1896	59 & 60 Vict. c. cxciv	7 August 1896
An Act to extend the time for the completion of the authorised Railways of the Easton and Church Hope Railway Company and for other purposes.
London, Chatham and Dover Railway (Capital) Act 1896	59 & 60 Vict. c. cxcv	7 August 1896
An Act to enable the London Chatham and Dover Railway Company to raise further capital and for other purposes.
Bournemouth Gas and Water Act 1896	59 & 60 Vict. c. cxcvi	7 August 1896
An Act for altering the limits for the supply of gas and water of the Bournemouth Gas and Water Company and for authorising that Company to construct new Gasworks and Waterworks and to raise additional capital and for other purposes.
Cork, Blackrock and Passage Railway Act 1896	59 & 60 Vict. c. cxcvii	7 August 1896
An Act to authorise the Cork Blackrock and Passage Railway Company to extend their Railway to Crosshaven and to confer further powers on the Company in relation to their undertaking and for other purposes.
Cornwall Minerals Railway Act 1896	59 & 60 Vict. c. cxcviii	7 August 1896
An Act to transfer the undertaking of the Cornwall Minerals Railway Company to the Great Western Railway Company and to empower the Great Western Railway Company to raise additional Capital.
Glasgow Corporation (General Powers) Act 1896	59 & 60 Vict. c. cxcix	7 August 1896
An Act to confer further powers on the Corporation of the City of Glasgow and for other purposes.
London, Chatham and Dover Railway (Further Powers) Act 1896	59 & 60 Vict. c. cc	7 August 1896
An Act to vest the Shortlands and Nunhead Railway in the London Chatham and Dover Railway Company to empower that Company to acquire additional lands and for other purposes.
Realisation and Debenture Corporation of Scotland Limited Act 1896	59 & 60 Vict. c. cci	7 August 1896
An Act to enable the Realisation and Debenture Corporation of Scotland Limited to create debenture and preference stock and for other purposes.
Brighton Marine Palace and Pier Act 1896	59 & 60 Vict. c. ccii	7 August 1896
An Act to extend some of the powers of the Brighton Marine Palace and Pier Company to make further provision with respect to the completion of the Pier and works and for other purposes.
Edinburgh Extension Act 1896 (repealed)	59 & 60 Vict. c. cciii	7 August 1896
An Act to amalgamate the Burgh of Portobello with the City and Royal Burgh of Edinburgh and to extend the boundaries of the City and Royal Burgh and the County of the City of Edinburgh to extend the limits of compulsory Water Supply to transfer to the Corporation of Edinburgh the Gasworks and undertaking of the Portobello Gas Light Company Limited to amend and extend the Edinburgh Municipal and Police and other Acts and for other purposes. (Repealed by Edinburgh Corporation Order Confirmation Act 1933 (24 & 25 Geo. 5. c. v))
Edinburgh Street Tramways Act 1896 (repealed)	59 & 60 Vict. c. cciv	7 August 1896
An Act to authorise the Edinburgh Street Tramways Company to extend their Tramways and for other purposes. (Repealed by Edinburgh Corporation Order Confirmation Act 1932 (22 & 23 Geo. 5. c. vii))
Highland Railway Act 1896	59 & 60 Vict. c. ccv	7 August 1896
An Act to revive the powers and extend the time limited by the Highland Railway (New Lines) Act 1890 (Note: Highland Railway (New Lines) Act 1890 (53 & 54 Vict. c. lxi)) for the completion of Railway No. 2 authorised by that Act.
Lancashire, Derbyshire and East Coast Railway Act 1896	59 & 60 Vict. c. ccvi	7 August 1896
An Act to authorise the Lancashire Derbyshire and East Coast Railway Company to construct certain Branch Railways and acquire additional lands in connexion with their Chesterfield and Lincoln Separate Undertaking and for other purposes.
Manchester, Sheffield and Lincolnshire Railway Act 1896	59 & 60 Vict. c. ccvii	7 August 1896
An Act to confer further powers upon the Manchester Sheffield and Lincolnshire Railway Company the Cheshire Lines Committee and the Manchester South Junction and Altrincham Railway Company to incorporate the Dee and Birkenhead Committee by the name of the North Wales and Liverpool Railway Committee and for other purposes.
Strand Improvement Act 1896	59 & 60 Vict. c. ccviii	7 August 1896
An Act to authorise the widening of part of the Strand on the south side and the taking of lands in the Parishes of St. Martin-in-the-Fields and St Clement Danes and for other purposes.
Wallasey Urban District Council (Promenade) Act 1896	59 & 60 Vict. c. ccix	7 August 1896
An Act to authorise the Wallasey Urban District Council to construct a Promenade and other works to acquire certain lands and for other purposes.
Vale of Glamorgan Railway Act 1896	59 & 60 Vict. c. ccx	7 August 1896
An Act for conferring further powers on the Vale of Glamorgan Railway Company for the completion of their authorised Railways.
London County Council (Vauxhall Bridge Tramways) Act 1896	59 & 60 Vict. c. ccxi	7 August 1896
An Act to enable the London County Council to construct Tramways over Vauxhall Bridge as about to be reconstructed and the approaches thereto in the County of London and for other purposes.
Port Talbot Railway and Docks (South Wales Mineral Railway Junction) Act 1896	59 & 60 Vict. c. ccxii	7 August 1896
An Act to enable the Port Talbot Railway and Docks Company to construct new Railways in the County of Glamorgan to join the South Wales Mineral Railway and a Railway known as the Whitworth Railway and to acquire the last-mentioned Railway and for other purposes.
Dover Undercliff Reclamation Act 1896	59 & 60 Vict. c. ccxiii	7 August 1896
An Act for the protection reclamation and improvement of the Undercliff near Dover and lands adjoining the same and for other purposes.
London County Council (Money) Act 1896 (repealed)	59 & 60 Vict. c. ccxiv	7 August 1896
An Act to regulate the expenditure of Money by the London County Council on Capital Account during the current Financial Period and the raising of Money to meet such expenditure. (Repealed by London County Council (Finance Consolidation) Act 1912 (2 & 3 Geo. 5. c. cv))
Dundee Suburban Railway Act 1896	59 & 60 Vict. c. ccxv	7 August 1896
An Act to extend the time for the completion of the Dundee Suburban Railway and for other purposes.
Cheadle Railway Company Limited Act 1896	59 & 60 Vict. c. ccxvi	7 August 1896
An Act to make further provisions with respect to the subscription by the North Staffordshire Railway Company to the funds of the Cheadle Railway Mineral and Land Company Limited to confirm certain agreements between those Companies to change the name of the Company and for other purposes.
Glasgow and South Western Railway Act 1896	59 & 60 Vict. c. ccxvii	7 August 1896
An Act for conferring further Powers on the Glasgow and South Western Railway Company for the construction of works and the acquisition of lands and upon that Company and the Caledonian Railway Company with respect to their joint undertaking and for other purposes.
Great Western Railway (South Wales and Bristol Direct Railway) Act 1896	59 & 60 Vict. c. ccxviii	7 August 1896
An Act to empower the Great Western Railway Company to make new Railways in the Counties of Wilts and Gloucester and for other purposes.
West Highland Railway Act 1896	59 & 60 Vict. c. ccxix	7 August 1896
An Act to empower the West Highland Railway Company to extend their Railway from Fort William to Ballachulish and for other purposes.
Drogheda Corporation Act 1896	59 & 60 Vict. c. ccxx	7 August 1896
An Act to extend the boundaries of the Borough of Drogheda to provide for the transfer to the Corporation of Drogheda of the undertaking of the Drogheda Waterworks Company to authorise the issue of Corporation Stock and for other purposes.
Brighton Corporation Act 1896 (repealed)	59 & 60 Vict. c. ccxxi	7 August 1896
An Act to confer further powers upon the Mayor Aldermen and Burgesses of the Borough of Brighton and for other purposes. (Repealed by Brighton Corporation Act 1931 (21 & 22 Geo. 5. c. cix))
Donegal Railway Act 1896	59 & 60 Vict. c. ccxxii	7 August 1896
An Act to authorise the Donegal Railway Company to extend their Railway from Strabane to Londonderry and from Donegal to Ballyshannon to make agreements with the Londonderry Port and Harbour Commissioners and the Londonderry Bridge Commissioners and for other purposes.
Dublin United Tramways Act 1896	59 & 60 Vict. c. ccxxiii	7 August 1896
An Act to authorise the use of mechanical power upon portions of the undertaking of the Dublin United Tramways Company and for other purposes.
Edinburgh Improvement and Tramways Act 1896 (repealed)	59 & 60 Vict. c. ccxxiv	7 August 1896
An Act to authorise the Lord Provost Magistrates and Council of the City of Edinburgh to widen alter and improve certain streets places and districts within the said City to make new works to construct Tramways to provide additional accommodation for the conduct of Corporation business to acquire lands to amend Acts and for other purposes. (Repealed by Edinburgh Corporation Order Confirmation Act 1933 (24 & 25 Geo. 5. c. v))
Metropolitan Railway Act 1896	59 & 60 Vict. c. ccxxv	7 August 1896
An Act for conferring further powers upon the Metropolitan Railway Company in relation to their own undertaking and upon that Company and the Great Western and London and North Western Railway Companies in relation to undertakings in which they are jointly interested and for other purposes.
South Metropolitan Gas Act 1896	59 & 60 Vict. c. ccxxvi	7 August 1896
An Act to convert the capital of the South Metropolitan Gas Company and for other purposes.
Baker Street and Waterloo Railway Act 1896	59 & 60 Vict. c. ccxxvii	7 August 1896
An Act to confer further powers on the Baker Street and Waterloo Railway Company.
Kidderminster and Stourport Electric Tramway Act 1896 (repealed)	59 & 60 Vict. c. ccxxviii	7 August 1896
An Act to incorporate the Kidderminster and Stourport Electric Tramway Company and to empower the Company to construct Tramways and for other purposes. (Repealed by Statute Law (Repeals) Act 1998 (c. 43))
New River Company Act 1896	59 & 60 Vict. c. ccxxix	7 August 1896
An Act to confer further powers upon the Governor and Company of the New River brought from Chadwell and Amwell to London commonly called the New River Company for the execution, of new works the purchase of additional lands and the raising of further money and for other purposes.
Marlborough and Grafton Railway Act 1896	59 & 60 Vict. c. ccxxx	7 August 1896
An Act for making a Railway to be called the Marlborough and Grafton Railway and for other purposes.
Redheugh Bridge Act 1896 (repealed)	59 & 60 Vict. c. ccxxxi	7 August 1896
An Act to authorise the reconstruction of the bridge across the River Tyne known as the Redheugh Bridge and for other purposes. (Repealed by Tyne and Wear Act 1976 (c. xxxvi))
Great Western Railway (Additional Powers) Act 1896	59 & 60 Vict. c. ccxxxii	7 August 1896
An Act for conferring further powers upon the Great Western Railway Company in respect of their own undertaking and upon that Company and the Midland Railway Company and the London and North Western Railway Company in respect of undertakings in which they are jointly interested for amalgamating the Abbotsbury Much Wenlock and Severn Junction Marlborough Milford Wenlock Vale of Llangollen Llangollen and Corwen and Corwen and Bala Railway Companies with the Great Western Railway Company and for other purposes.
Taff Vale Railway Act 1896	59 & 60 Vict. c. ccxxxiii	7 August 1896
An Act to empower the Taff Vale Railway Company to construct new Railways and other works and acquire lands to amend certain provisions contained in the Acts relating to the Barry Dock and Railway Company and to the Bute Docks and for other purposes.
Glasgow Corporation Sewage Act 1896 (repealed)	59 & 60 Vict. c. ccxxxiv	7 August 1896
An Act to authorise the Corporation of Glasgow to acquire lands and construct works for sewage purposes to raise further moneys and for other purposes. (Repealed by Glasgow Corporation Sewage Order Confirmation Act 1935 (25 & 26 Geo. 5. c. xli))
Local Government Board (Ireland) Provisional Order Confirmation (No. 1) Act 1896	59 & 60 Vict. c. ccxxxv	14 August 1896
An Act to confirm a Provisional Order made by the Local Government Board for Ireland under the Public Health (Ireland) Act 1878 relating to the Urban Sanitary District of Armagh.
	Armagh Town Provisional Order 1896 Town of Armagh. Provisional Order.	
Local Government Board's Provisional Orders Confirmation (No. 13) Act 1896	59 & 60 Vict. c. ccxxxvi	14 August 1896
An Act to confirm certain Provisional Orders of the Local Government Board relating to the Counties of Bedford Chester Essex Flint Gloucester Hertford Huntingdon Middlesex West Suffolk and Wilts.
	Counties of Bedford and Huntingdon (Swineshead and Tilbrook) Order 1896 Provisional Order made in pursuance of Section 54 of the Local Government Act 1888 for altering the Boundary between Counties.	
	County of Chester (Threapwood) Order 1896 Provisional Order made in pursuance of Section 54 of the Local Government Act 1888 for altering the Boundary between Counties.	
	County of West Suffolk (Sudbury) Order 1896 Provisional Order made in pursuance of Sections 54 and 59 of the Local Government Act 1888.	
	County of Gloucester (Kemble and Keynes) Order 1896 Provisional Order made in pursuance of Section 54 of the Local Government Act 1888 for altering the Boundary between Counties.	
	County of Hertford (South Mimms) Order 1896 Provisional Order made in pursuance of Section 54 of the Local Government Act 1888 for altering the Boundary between Counties.	
Local Government Board's Provisional Order Confirmation (No. 15) Act 1896	59 & 60 Vict. c. ccxxxvii	14 August 1896
An Act to confirm a Provisional Order of the Local Government Board relating to Plymouth.
	Plymouth (Extension) Order 1896 Provisional Order made in pursuance of Sections 54 and 59 of the Local Government Act 1888.	
Local Government Board's Provisional Orders Confirmation (Housing of Working Classes) Act 1896	59 & 60 Vict. c. ccxxxviii	14 August 1896
An Act to confirm certain Provisional Orders of the Local Government Board under the Housing of the Working Classes Act 1890 relating to Birkenhead and Leeds.
	Birkenhead (Housing of Working Classes) Order 1896 Provisional Order for confirming an Improvement Scheme under Part I. of the Housing of the Working Classes Act 1890.	
	Leeds (Housing of Working Classes) Order 1896 Provisional Order for confirming an Improvement Scheme under Part I. of the Housing of the Working Classes Act 1890.	
Bilston Improvement Act 1896 (repealed)	59 & 60 Vict. c. ccxxxix	14 August 1896
An Act for making further and better provision for the improvement health and good government of the Urban District of Bilston and for other purposes. (Repealed by Wolverhampton Corporation Act 1969 (c. lx))
Invergarry and Fort Augustus Railway Act 1896	59 & 60 Vict. c. ccxl	14 August 1896
An Act for making a Railway and Pier in the County of Inverness to be called the Invergarry and Fort Augustus Railway and for other purposes.
Staines Reservoirs, &c. Act 1896	59 & 60 Vict. c. ccxli	14 August 1896
An Act to authorise the construction of new reservoirs at Staines and other works for affording an additional supply of Water for certain districts north of the River Thames and for other purposes.
Birmingham, North Warwickshire and Stratford-upon-Avon Railway Act 1896	59 & 60 Vict. c. ccxlii	14 August 1896
An Act to enable the Birmingham North Warwickshire and Stratford-upon-Avon Railway Company to lay an additional line of rails on portions of the Evesham Redditch and Stratford-upon-Avon Junction and the East and West Junction Railways and in connexion therewith to improve and equip such portions of those railways to enable the Company to raise further capital and for other purposes.
Brading Harbour and Railway Act 1896	59 & 60 Vict. c. ccxliii	14 August 1896
An Act to confer further powers upon the Brading Harbour Improvement and Railway Company and for other purposes.
Neath, Pontardawe and Brynaman Railway Act 1896	59 & 60 Vict. c. ccxliv	14 August 1896
An Act to empower the Neath Pontardawe and Brynaman Railway Company and the Great Western Railway Company to enter into working and traffic agreements.
Barry Urban District Council Act 1896	59 & 60 Vict. c. ccxlv	14 August 1896
An Act to enable the Barry Urban District Council to acquire Cadoxton Common and to maintain and regulate the same to construct new Waterworks to extend the limits of Gas and Water Supply for conferring further powers in relation to Buildings Streets and Sanitary matters for making further and better provision for the improvement health and local government of the District and for other purposes.
Belfast Corporation Act 1896	59 & 60 Vict. c. ccxlvi	14 August 1896
An Act to extend the City of Belfast and for other purposes.
Willesden Sewerage Act 1896 (repealed)	59 & 60 Vict. c. ccxlvii	14 August 1896
An Act to make provision as to the admission to the Metropolitan Main Drainage System of Sewage from part of the District of Willesden in the County of Middlesex. (Repealed by Local Law (North West London Boroughs) Order 1965 (SI 1965/533))
St. Anne's-on-the-Sea Improvement Act 1896 (repealed)	59 & 60 Vict. c. ccxlviii	14 August 1896
An Act to confer further powers on the Urban District Council of Saint Anne's-on-the-Sea in the County Palatine of Lancaster for the improvement of their District and for other purposes. (Repealed by Lytham St. Anne's Corporation Act 1923 (13 & 14 Geo. 5. c. lxxxvi))
Londonderry Improvement Act 1896	59 & 60 Vict. c. ccxlix	14 August 1896
An Act for the reduction of the Municipal Franchise in the City of Londonderry for the alteration and increase in the number of the Municipal Wards and of the number of Aldermen and Councillors elected for the said City for the improvement of the City the raising of further Moneys and for other purposes.
Sheffield District Railway Act 1896	59 & 60 Vict. c. ccl	14 August 1896
An Act for incorporating and conferring flowers on the Sheffield District Railway Company and for other purposes.
Weston-super-Mare Urban District Council Act 1896	59 & 60 Vict. c. ccli	14 August 1896
An Act for empowering the Urban District Council of Weston-super-Mare to acquire the undertaking of Knightstone Weston-super-Mare Limited and to construct works and for extending the powers of the Council in relation to certain matters and for other purposes.
City and South London Railway Act 1896	59 & 60 Vict. c. cclii	14 August 1896
An Act to extend the time for the purchase of lands for the purposes of the City and South London Railway Act 1893 (Note: City and South London Railway Act 1893 (56 & 57 Vict. c. ccvii)) and for the completion of the underground Railway and works thereby authorised and to empower the Company to acquire additional lands and for other purposes.
Blackrock and Kingstown Drainage and Improvement Act 1896	59 & 60 Vict. c. ccliii	14 August 1896
An Act to confirm and legalise certain Works constructed by the Blackrock and Kingstown Drainage Board to confer on the Board further powers as to the borrowing of moneys and for other purposes.

=== Private and personal acts ===
Short title	Citation	Royal assent
Long title
Wolverton Estate Act 1896	59 & 60 Vict. c. 1 Pr.	21 May 1896
An Act to confer upon Frederic, Lord Wolverton, and the Trustees of the property settled by a Deed of Arrangement, dated the 31st day of December 1888, in relation to the residuary real and personal estate of the late George Grenfell, Lord Wolverton, respectively, powers to raise money for the more speedy carrying out of certain of the objects of the said Deed; and to enable the grant of a jointure and portions by Frederic, Lord Wolverton, and for other purposes.
Chambers Estate Act 1896	59 & 60 Vict. c. 2 Pr.	20 July 1896
An Act for empowering the Trustees of the Will of the late John Chambers of the Hurst Tibshelf in the County of Derby with the consent of the Chancery Division of the High Court to sell the Colliery Undertakings subject to his will to a Company or Companies limited by shares either wholly or partially for shares stock or securities and to retain such shares stock or securities as if authorised investments.
Griffin's Divorce Act 1896 (Note: This act was not printed by the Queen's Printer.)	59 & 60 Vict. c. 3 Pr.	21 May 1896
An Act to dissolve the Marriage of Richard Hollingsworth Griffin, formerly of 154, Rathmines Road, in the County of Dublin, but now of 67, Stephen Street, in the City of Dublin, Mechanical Engineer, with Annie Beatrice Griffin, his now wife, and to enable him to marry again, and for other purposes.
Scovell's Divorce Act 1896	59 & 60 Vict. c. 4 Pr.	2 July 1896
An Act to dissolve the Marriage of George Vance Scovell, of the Grosvenor Hotel, Dublin, Esquire, with Vivienne Scovell, his now wife; and to enable him to marry again, and for other purposes.
Todd's Divorce Act 1896	59 & 60 Vict. c. 5 Pr.	2 July 1896
An Act to Dissolve the Marriage of Robert Archer Ross Todd of Ballyshannon in the County of Donegal Solicitor with Sarah Gertrude Todd his now wife and to enable him to marry again and for other purposes.
Abensur's Naturalisation Act 1896	59 & 60 Vict. c. 6 Pr.	7 August 1896
An Act to naturalise Isaac Aaron Abensur, and to grant and confer upon him all the rights, privileges, and capacities of a natural-born subject of Her Majesty the Queen.

=== Sources ===
- The Public General Statutes, Volume 33: 59 & 60 Victoria – 1896. Vol. 33. 1896 – via Internet Archive.

== See also ==
- List of acts of the Parliament of the United Kingdom
