= Folkestone power station =

Former power station in England

- Country: England
- Location: Folkestone, Kent
- Coordinates: 51°05′08″N 01°09′05″E
- Status: Decommissioned
- Construction began: 1896
- Commission date: 1898
- Decommission date: 1960
- Owners: Folkestone Electricity Supply Corporation Limited (1897–1929); County of London Electric Supply Company (1929–1948); British Electricity Authority (1948–1955); Central Electricity Authority (1955–1957); Central Electricity Generating Board (1958–1960)
- Operator: As owner

Thermal power station
- Primary fuel: Coal
- Secondary fuel: Fuel oil
- Turbine technology: Steam turbines and oil engines
- Cooling towers: 3
- Cooling source: Circulating cooling water

Power generation
- Units operational: 1 x 1.5 MW, 1 x 1.875 MW, 1 x 3.75 MW
- Nameplate capacity: 7.125 MW
- Annual net output: 5,087 MWh (1930)

Folkestone power station supplied electricity to the Borough of Folkestone and the surrounding area from 1898 to 1960. The power station was built by the Folkestone Electricity Supply Company Limited which operated it until the nationalisation of the British electricity industry in 1948. It was redeveloped in the 1920s to meet the increased demand for electricity.

== History ==
Folkestone Corporation applied in 1896 for a provisional order under the Electric Lighting Acts to generate and supply electricity to Borough of Folkestone. The Folkestone Electric Lighting Order 1896 was granted by the Board of Trade and was confirmed by Parliament through the Electric Lighting Orders Confirmation (No. 1) Act 1896 (59 & 60 Vict. c. lxxxii). The Folkestone Electricity Supply Company Limited was formed on 26 March 1897 to acquire the Folkestone Electric Lighting Order. The company built the power station with a capital of £50,000 in Morehall, Folkestone (51°05′08″N 01°09′05″E). It was commissioned in 1898 and consisted of three Davey-Paxman boilers powering three Peache engines driving one of 246 HP and two 120 HP driving Parker dynamos. A second 246 HP set was added in 1899.

A major upgrade was undertaken in 1922–26.

In 1929 the County of London Electric Supply Company acquired a majority shareholding in the Folkestone Electricity Supply Company Limited. This was part of a wider policy of acquisitions. Between 1918 and 1936 the County of London Company acquired 14 other electricity companies. It was able to consolidate development over a large area of south east England through its Kent Power Company subsidiary.

The British electricity supply industry was nationalised in 1948 under the provisions of the Electricity Act 1947 (10 & 11 Geo. 6. c. 54). The Folkestone electricity undertaking was abolished, ownership of Folkestone power station was vested in the British Electricity Authority, and subsequently the Central Electricity Authority and the Central Electricity Generating Board (CEGB). At the same time the electricity distribution and sales responsibilities of the Folkestone electricity undertaking were transferred to the South Eastern Electricity Board (SEEBOARD).

Folkestone power station was closed in 1960.

== Equipment specification ==
=== Plant in 1923 ===
By 1923 the plant comprised boilers delivering 45,400 lb/h (5.72 kg/s) of steam to:

- 2 × 150 kW reciprocating engines driving direct current (DC) generators
- 2 × 300 kW reciprocating engines DC generators
- 2 × 300 kW steam turbo-generators (DC)
- 2 × 500 kW steam turbo-generators (DC)
- 1 × 1,250 kW steam turbo-alternator, alternating current (AC)

In addition there was 1 × 200 kW oil engine driven DC generator.

These machines had a total generating capacity of 3,950 kW, comprising 2,700 kW DC and 1,250 kW AC.

Electricity supply to consumers was:

- 420 & 210 Volt DC.

=== Plant in 1954 ===
By 1954 the plant comprised:

- Boilers:
  - 2 × Thompson 28,000 lb/h (3.53 kg/s) underfeed stoker boilers, steam conditions were 215 psi and 600°F (14.8 bar and 316°C), steam was supplied to:
- Generators:
  - 1 × 1.5 MW Brush-Ljungstrom 6.6 kV turbo-alternator
  - 1 × 1.875 MW Brush-Ljungstrom 6.6 kV turbo-alternator
  - 1 × 3.75 MW Brush-Ljungstrom 6.6 kV turbo-alternator

The total generating capacity was 7.125 MW with an output capacity of 4 MW.

Condenser water was cooled in three Davenport cooling towers with a capacity of 345,000 gallons per hour (1,568 m^{3}/hour).

== Operations ==
The 1898 generating plant had a capacity of 484 kW.

=== Operating data 1921–23 ===
The electricity supply data for the period 1921–23 was:

Folkestone power station supply data 1921–23
Electricity Use	Units	Year		
Electricity Use	Units	1921	1922	1923
Lighting and domestic	MWh	1,350	1,430	1,703
Public lighting	MWh	94	107	146
Traction	MWh	0	0	0
Power	MWh	444	458	540
Bulk supply	MWh	0	0	0
Total use	MWh	1,888	1,995	2,389

Electricity Loads on the system were:

Year		1921	1922	1923
Maximum load	kW	1,500	1,644	2,072
Total connections	kW	6,160	6,365	6,825
Load factor	Per cent	21.6	20.5	19.2

Revenue from the sale of current (in 1923) was £53,841; the surplus of revenue over expenses was £31, 422.

=== Operating data 1929–46 ===
In 1929 the company sold 4,902 MWh of electricity, this increased to 5,087 MWh in 1930.

In 1946 Folkestone power station supplied 4,597 MWh of electricity; the maximum output load was 4,366 kW. The load factor was 15.0 %, and the thermal efficiency was 11.98 %.

=== Operating data 1954–58 ===
Operating data for the period 1954–58 was:

Folkestone power station operating data, 1954–58
Year	Running hours	Max output capacity, MW	Electricity supplied, MWh	Thermal efficiency per cent
1954	1306	4	2533	9.77
1955	1191	4	2766	10.19
1956	1002	4	2116	9.57
1957	452	4	766	7.94
1958	154	4	618	8.52

== See also ==
- Timeline of the UK electricity supply industry
- List of power stations in England
