= Suffrage drama =

Form of dramatic literature

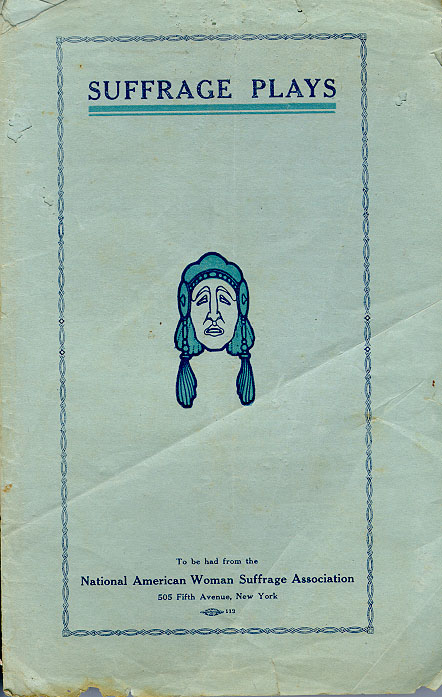
Pamphlet from NAWSA for women's suffrage plays to order.

Suffrage drama (also known as suffrage plays or suffrage theatre) is a form of dramatic literature that emerged during the British women's suffrage movement in the early twentieth century. Suffrage performances lasted approximately from 1907-1914. Many suffrage plays called for a predominant or all female cast. Suffrage plays served to reveal issues behind the suffrage movement. These plays also revealed many of the double standards that women faced on a daily basis. Suffrage theatre was a form of realist theatre, which was influenced by the plays of Henrik Ibsen. Suffrage theatre combined familiar everyday situations with relatable characters on the stage in the style of realist theatre.

== Pro-suffrage plays ==
Suffrage dramas in favor of women's suffrage often portray strong female characters who illustrate the qualities of rational, informed voters. They are meant to imply the obsolescence and inaccuracy of gender stereotypes that justified denying women the vote, such as separate spheres philosophy. Such characters often convince male or female anti-suffragists to revise their beliefs and support women's suffrage. Other plays satirize anti-suffragists as buffoons or narrow-minded individuals opposing progress. Many of these plays deliberately required few props and no sets. This was to allow amateur acting companies to perform the dramas at minimal cost, allowing them to be more widely performed and spread pro-suffrage sentiment. Due to the low cost of organizing a performance, suffrage plays were often performed in the drawing rooms of private residences and in small professional theaters.

=== United Kingdom ===
During the suffrage movement in the United Kingdom, eighteen short plays were published that have been coined women's suffrage drama but these represent only a few of the numerous plays with suffrage themes, the majority written in support of the Cause, that have been identified. Susan Croft's 'Chronology of Plays addressing or supporting Suffrage Issues 1907-1914' lists 170, a figure further supplemented by additional plays, discovered since publication, listed online. Elizabeth Robins's Votes for Women and Cicely Hamilton and Christopher St. John's How the Vote Was Won are two predominant examples of suffrage plays. Elizabeth Robins's Votes for Women was one of the first published women's suffrage plays. It was performed in 1907 at the Court Theatre in London. Julie Holledge, British actor and director, wrote that Votes for Women “heralded the beginning of a suffrage theatre” and assisted in organizing actresses and “their involvement with the women’s rights movement and their dissatisfaction with a male dominated theatre, these women had begun to develop a drama that could express the reality of women’s lives...With the emergence of the mass suffrage movement in the Edwardian era, over a thousand actresses were thrust into the fight for votes for women. Out of their struggle the first ‘women’s theatre movement of the twentieth century was born.”

The characters in these plays were realistic, middle class characters fighting for or against women's suffrage. These plays often featured female characters talking with each other about the suffrage movement and often broke the boundaries between class. Suffrage plays led to the 1908 formation of the Actresses' Franchise League that “provided the infrastructure to promote women’s endeavors on a large scale.”

Suffragists used plays to create changes in social attitudes. Attending a play was a social and community event, therefore their message reached a large audience in a short period of time. Some suffragists would say, “a change in legislation was attributed to the production of one play.” Suffrage plays were a source of optimism for the female suffrage movement. Suffrage theatre gave prominence to women's roles and issues for the first time and greatly influenced the women's suffrage movement.

Theatre played a crucial role in the United Kingdom women's suffrage movement. Pro-suffrage acting organizations such as The Actresses' Franchise League and Edith Craig's Pioneer Players formed alongside more political entities like the National Society for Women's Suffrage to campaign for the vote using drama and lectures. Only actresses were permitted to join the Actresses Franchise League. However, the AFL vowed to "assist all other [women's suffrage] Leagues wherever possible" by creating and performing "propaganda plays" and hosting informative lectures on the subject. The United Kingdom was home to many of the premiere suffragist playwrights, including Cicely Hamilton (author of Diana of Dobson's), George Bernard Shaw (Press Cuttings), Beatrice Harraden (Lady Geraldine's Speech) and Bessie Hatton (Before Sunrise). Contemporary plays concerning the women's suffrage movement continue to be written and performed in Britain, such as Ian Flint's Woman (2003), Rebecca Lenkiewicz's Her Naked Skin (2008) and Sally Sheringham's The Sound of Breaking Glass (2009).

British suffrage organizations and magazines also showed an interest in the position of women in India and suffrage performance in Britain included tableaux by Indian women, performed in Sloane Square, while Votes for Women reviewed plays like Tagore's Chitra.

=== America ===
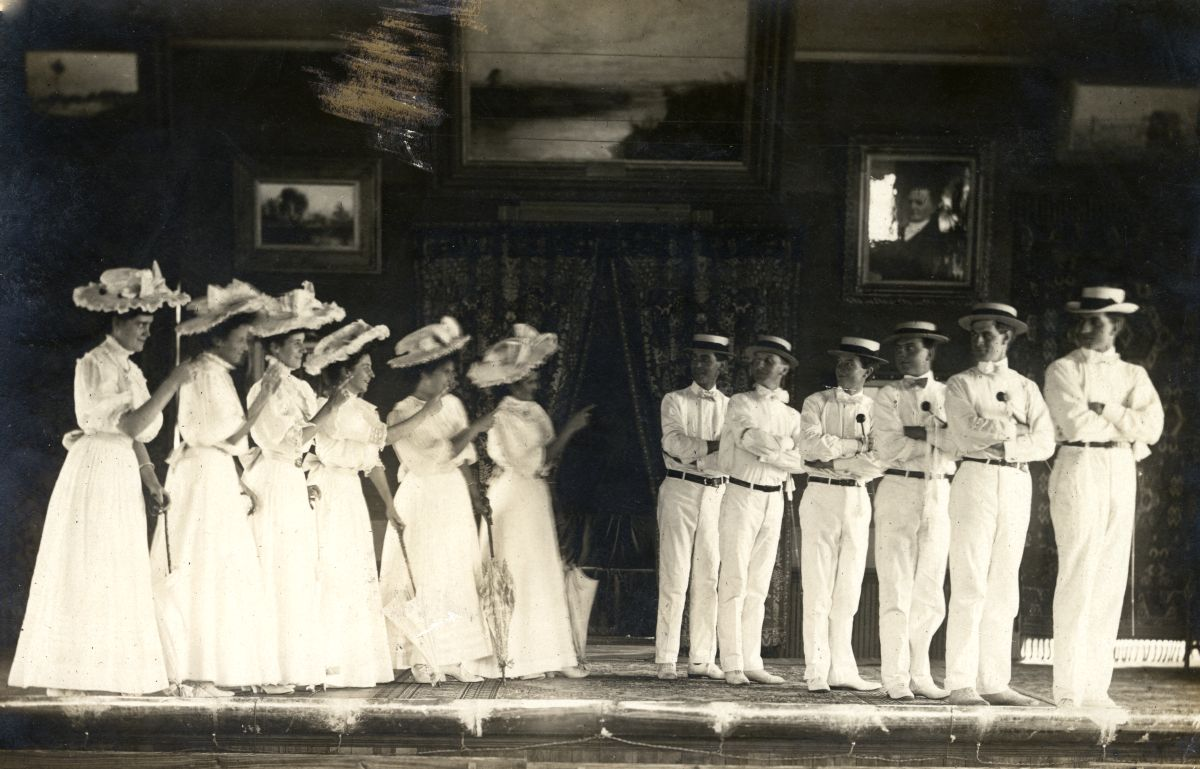
Cast from the play, "Women, Women, Women, Suffragettes, Yes," performed in 1900 by Koreshan Unity

Although many suffrage dramas were written by British authors and playwrights, a number of American writers contributed to the overall body of pro-suffrage plays. Many of these authors were well known in their own right: Charlotte Perkins Gilman authored the recently re-published Three Women, Something to Vote For, The Ceaseless Struggle of Sex: A Dramatic View, and the suffragist/World War I correspondent Inez Milholland composed If Women Voted. Organizations such as the National American Woman Suffrage Association viewed theatre as an effective way to spread pro-suffrage sentiment and provided suffrage dramas to professional and amateur theatres. Other American dramatists who contributed to the genre include Miriam Nicholson, Elizabeth Gerberding, Salina Solomon and Mrs. Charles Caffin. Although the suffrage drama movement didn't officially start until the early 20th century, there were similar plays being published by the late 19th century, such as Ella Cheever Thayer's Lords of Creation. Unfortunately many of the suffrage dramas circulated by the NAWSA have been lost, and the only evidence of their existence has been found in surviving order pamphlets for the plays.

== Anti-suffrage plays ==
Some of the earliest plays to address the question of women's suffrage were written in opposition to extending the vote. These plays satirized the notion of revised (and more equal) gender roles by portraying women as incapable of influence afforded to men or characterizing suffragists as "unwomanly" grotesques. Little research has been done into the prevalence or popularity of these anti-suffrage plays. One notable example that transitioned from small parlor performances (like the pro-suffrage plays performed by amateur actors) to widespread popularity in the United States is The Spirit of Seventy-Six; or, The Coming Woman, A Prophetic Drama (1868) by Ariana Randolph Wormeley Curtis and Daniel Sargent Curtis. The play was written following the Civil War, as many abolitionists were beginning to shift their focus to different social issues, such as women's suffrage. The play is meant to be an absurdist fantasy depicting what life would be like if women and men traded gender roles. For example, women in the play wear men's clothing, smoke cigars, and hold all political offices while men struggle to tend to children in the home. The play implies that by enfranchising women they will all become horribly masculine, and suggests that radical suffrage activists campaign to "cover their own undesirability or incompetence".

== Influential British Suffrage Plays ==
- How the Vote Was Won by Cicely Hamilton and Christopher St John
- Votes for Women by Elizabeth Robins
- Lady Geraldine's Speech by Beatrice Harraden
- A Chat with Mrs Chicky and Miss Appleyard's Awakening by Evelyn Glover
- A Woman's Influence by Gertrude Jennings
- The Apple by Inez Bensusan

== See also ==
- Actresses' Franchise League
- Women Writers' Suffrage League
- Women's suffrage in film
