= Bessie Hatton =

English actress and feminist (1867–1964)

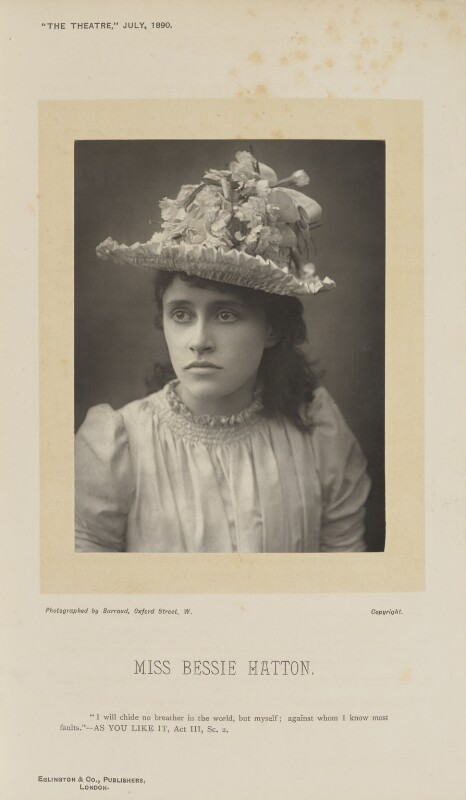
Portrait of Bessie Hatton by Herbert Rose Barraud, 1909.

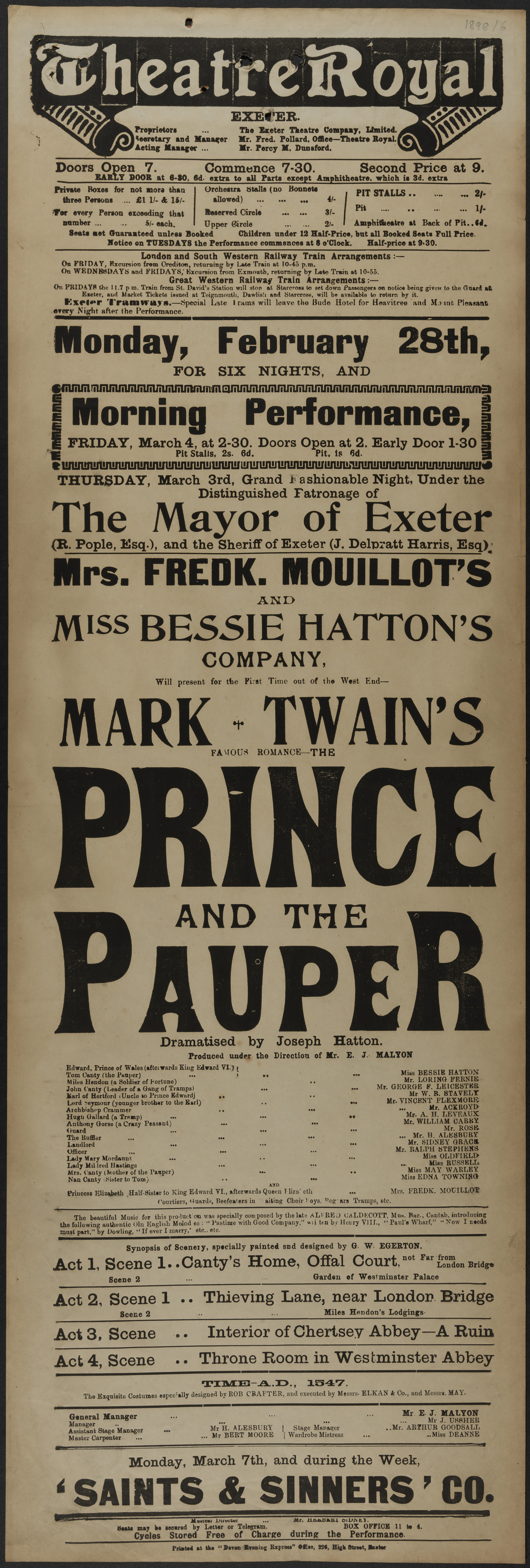
Playbill from 1898 performance of Hatton's The Prince and the Pauper

Bessie Lyle Hatton (22 November 1867 – 25 March 1964) was an English actress, playwright, journalist, and feminist, and took part in the struggle for women's suffrage in the United Kingdom.

== Life ==
Hatton was born on 22 November 1867 in Claines, Worcestershire. Her father was Joseph Hatton, a novelist and journalist, and her mother was Louisa Johnson, her elder brother was explorer Frank Hatton. She was educated at a convent school in Ardennes and at Bedford College, London, however she left college to join Frank Benson's company who were performing Shakespeare. She performed in Judah at the Shaftesbury Theatre with Gertrude Warden in 1890.

On the advice of her father and despite her concerns that it might interfere with her acting career, Hatton authored several popular works of fiction, including The Village of Youth and Other Fairytales (1895) and her play Before Sunrise. This play was staged at the Royal Albert Hall on 11 December 1909 for the Women's Freedom League.

In June 1908 she and fellow actress and writer Cicely Mary Hamilton founded the Women Writers' Suffrage League. The organisation was open to both men and women, and each affiliation. Hatton was the organising secretary, took part in events, and organised entertainment for the suffrage meetings.

When World War I broke out, The Women Writers Suffrage League helped establish a library at Endell Street Military Hospital, and helped organise recreation at the hospital. Hatton never married. She died on 25 March 1964.
