= William Tully =

William Tully may refer to:

- William Tully (diver), Australian diver (1931 or 1932 – 10 January 1976)
- William Tully (tennis), American tennis player (9 December 1925 – 21 July 2016)
- William J. Tully, American lawyer and politician from New York
- William Alcock Tully, Surveyor General of Queensland
- William Tully, protagonist of the 1919 novel William – an Englishman
