= Beatrice Harraden =

British writer and suffragette (1864–1936)

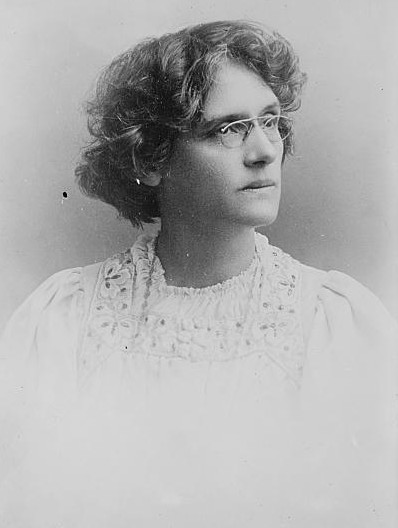
- Beatrice Harraden in 1913
- Born: 24 January 1864; Hampstead, London, England, United Kingdom of Great Britain and Ireland
- Died: 5 May 1936 (aged 72); Barton-on-Sea, Hampshire, England, United Kingdom
- Education: Cheltenham Ladies' College; Bedford College, London
- Occupation: Writer
- Writing career
- Language: English
- Period: Edwardian
- Notable work: Ships That Pass in the Night

Signature
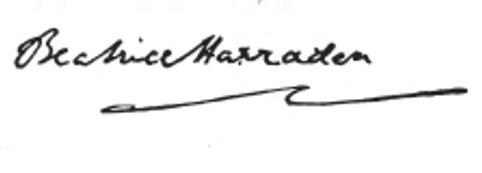

Beatrice Harraden (24 January 1864 – 5 May 1936) was a British novelist, playwright and suffragette. She was a founding member of the Women's Social and Political Union (WSPU) and a member of the Women Writers Suffrage League. She published writing in the Votes for Women newspaper and novels. Her most successful work was Ships That Pass in the Night (1893).

== Life ==
Harraden was born in Hampstead, London on 24 January 1864, to parents Samuel Harraden, a Cambridge-educated businessman who exported musical instruments to British India, and Rosalie Lindstedt Harraden, an Anglo-Indian woman. Harraden grew up to become an influential feminist writer and suffragette. She studied at Cheltenham Ladies' College in Gloucestershire, as well as at Queen's College and Bedford College in London. In 1883, she received her BA degree as well as an honours degree in Classics and Mathematics, which would have been a noteworthy feat for a woman in this era.

Harraden suffered lifelong illness which included a severe case of diphtheria and damage to her ulnar nerve as a result of playing the violoncello. In the early 1890s, she tried the rest cure at Menton on the French Riviera; took the Alpine Cure at a sanitarium in Davos, Switzerland; and experimented with hydrotherapy at a spa in Harrogate in the West Riding of Yorkshire, among other efforts to recover her health.

Her experience in the Alps resulted in her first novel Ships That Pass in the Night (1893), a best-seller which sold over one million copies. The love story set in a tuberculosis sanatorium, follows protagonist, Bernadine, an independent teacher, writer and activist, who falls in love with Robert, the Disagreeable man. After recovering and leaving the sanatorium, Bernadine returns to England. The popular novel ends rather tragically with Bernadine dying suddenly in a traffic accident. Though Harraden continued her career as a writer, she failed to achieve similar success with subsequent books which included novels, short stories and books for children.

Harraden spent several summer holidays lodging at The Green Dragon inn at Little Stretton, Shropshire, walking and writing. Her memories of this and the landlady, a Mrs Benbow, led to her writing a short story, At the Green Dragon, published in 1894.

In 1894, Harraden travelled to the United States to visit British friends John and Agnes Kendall in San Diego, California. On her arrival in the New York, she was greeted as a celebrity and sought out by influential literary people. She recovered her health on a lemon ranch in the El Cajon Valley and in the seaside resort of La Jolla, returning to San Diego several times during the late 1890s. Her experience led to the production of Two Health Seekers in Southern California (1897) with Dr. William A. Edwards, and Hilda Strafford and The Remittance Man: Two California Stories (1897).

Harraden was both a leader of the suffragette movement and a founding member of the Women's Social and Political Union (WSPU), befriending new members like Helen Craggs, and she was also an integral member of the Women Writers' Suffrage League and Women's Tax Resistance League.

Unlike the WSPU, who only welcomed women as members, the Women Writers Suffrage League welcomed men, women and members from diverse political parties. The only dictate for membership to the Writer's League, other than having been paid for a literary work, was support of the suffragette cause. These writers were agitators demanding access to the male dominated civic and social institutions, but they used their pens to influence society's social scene and the theatre. Harraden therefore turned to this group as the WSPU became increasingly militant and exclusive.

She published her work in the suffragette paper Votes for Women and travelled extensively in Europe and the United States due to her involvement in the women's movement. This included Holiday Campaigns in the Lake District for Liverpool WSPU organiser Alice Davies, which she took part in with the Australian suffragette Vida Goldstein. She also involved herself as a reader for the Oxford English Dictionary, and this, too is reflected in her fiction: The Scholar's Daughter (1906) is set among lexicographers.

In 1930, she received a Civil List pension for her literary work. She died at Barton-on-Sea, Hampshire, on 5 May 1936, aged 72.

== Works ==
Harraden's commitment to the women's rights movement can be seen throughout her writing. Many of her works—if not directly referencing the suffragette cause—include themes of gender dynamics, male/female power struggles, and address "the alienation of the individual in the modern world". Harraden's female characters are strong, independent, and highly intelligent and yet remain maternal and sympathetic; her heroines are not afraid to express emotions that may have been considered "womanly" or weak at this time.

In her Hilda Strafford (1897), the protagonist, Hilda, moves to California to marry Robert Strafford, a farmer. After a storm in which much of the farm is destroyed, Hilda tries to comfort the distraught Robert. Robert is inconsolable and, yet Hilda proceeds to tell him she is no longer happy merely being a "settler's wife". Robert dies of the shock of this news. When Hilda turns to her friend Ben for comfort, he views her as cold and unfeeling and blames her for Robert's death. The protagonist Hilda, is characterized as harsh and bitter by the men around her just because of her desire for independence – an unexpected and formidable trait in a woman in this era.

Her play Lady Geraldine's Speech, first published in the Women's Social and Political Union newspaper Votes for Women in 1909, looks at protagonist, Lady Geraldine, a wealthy socialite who comprehends little about the suffragette cause, and yet is an anti-suffragette. In the play, Lady Geraldine, has agreed to make a speech at an anti-suffrage meeting, but quickly realizes she has little information about the issue and needs a ghostwriter to help develop her argument. Lady Geraldine turns to her old-friend Dr. Alice Romney, a pro-suffragette progressive to help her construct her speech. Throughout the course of the play, Romney's suffragette friends continually arrive at the house for their own meeting. The characters include a famous pianist, a famous artist, a literature professor, a typist, and a maid. Lady Geraldine actually begins to admire these independent, intelligent, and driven women as they all pitch in to help her with her speech.

Harraden humorously summarizes the flawed arguments of the anti-suffragist with Romney finishing Geraldine's speech by telling her to stress the "degradation of Womanhood. Degradation and disintegration of entire Empire... Emphatic, nay passionate, insistence on your own brainlessness-that is very important."

Harraden even cites Shakespeare's writings and his strong, independent female characters to suggest he would support the suffragette cause. As the character, Professor Miller, in Lady Geraldine's Speech, lists Portia, Hermione, Cordelia, Rosalind, Beatrice, and Imogen all as "women of brain, education, and initiative" that the suffragettes model themselves after.

The play concludes with Geraldine throwing her speech into the fire and deciding she needs further study of the suffrage movement before she settles on her beliefs. Lady Geraldine's Speech provides an exceptional example of Harraden's ability to use her quick-witted dialogue and intellect to expose the ignorance of anti-suffragists arguments. She emphasizes the positive aspects of suffragette women and focuses on their intellect, as well as their acceptance of others as can be seen in Lady Geraldine's Speech—upon meeting an anti-suffragist, the suffragettes, rather than berating her for her ideals, instead choose to help her with her speech and tell her their own personal reasons for joining the suffrage movement.

== Theatre in the British women's suffrage movement ==
As a writer for the suffrage movement at this time, Harraden capitalized on the similarities "between the stage and the public speaking platform to encourage women to raise their voices in a public forum". As seen in Harraden's Lady Geraldine's Speech, the women's movement in Britain in this period used the theatre as a forum for suffrage speeches and conversely used suffrage meetings as a place for theatre, creating a new form of political drama. Famous actress, writer, and journalist during the time, Cicely Hamilton, said in an interview that suffragists "had started a new system of propaganda by means of plays, that was so successful that everybody was trying to steal the plays or imitate them in some way." Many of these suffrage-era propagandistic productions hoped to encourage actual audience members to join the cause and challenged them to take action on what they witnessed. However, suffrage playwrights had to have an acute awareness that "public speaking platforms defied nineteenth-century notions of women's decorum, modesty, and submissiveness and marked them as aggressive and unfeminine". In this case, as they called for women to speak up for their right to vote, they also had to address the challenges women faced in speaking in any public setting. The playwrights used the theatrical forum to help women overcome their lack of practice and, hence, nervousness about public speaking; suffrage playwrights were able to employ highly trained and renowned actresses to speak eloquently on behalf of their cause. In fact, as the suffragette writers were fighting to have a public voice and a venue to be heard, they also struggled to find their public voice. Though these plays may have been well received by suffrage supporters, the average theatre goers and theatre reviewers at this time often dismissed these plays viewing them as "propaganda rather than art."

Suffrage playwrights not only used the stage as a platform to promote their political agenda, but also to combat pervasive ideas of femininity. These playwrights were tasked with making powerful, independent, intelligent women seem "normal" and unthreatening. They attempted to show how women with agency could function in society without the "disintegration of the empire" as a whole—which was a common anti-suffrage argument. They used their platform to depict women as more than overly emotional, child-bearing entities and instead place them in alternative societal roles. If they were to gain the sympathy of anti-suffrage women and not risk alienating the men with the power to give them the right to vote, they had to cleverly gain support and empathy for their cause.

== Selected bibliography ==
- Little Rosebud: Or, Things Will Take a Turn (1891)
- Ships That Pass in the Night (1893)
- In Varying Moods (short stories, 1894)
- Hilda Stafford and The Remittance Man (Two Californian Stories) (1897)
- The Fowler (1899)
- The Scholar's Daughter (1906)
- Interplay (1908)
- Lady Geraldine's Speech (1909)
- Out of the Wreck I Rise (1914)
- The Guiding Thread (1916)
- Patuffa (1923)
- Rachel (1926)
- Search Will Find It Out (1928)

== See also ==
- List of suffragists and suffragettes
- Women's Social and Political Union
- Suffrage Drama
