= How the Vote Was Won =

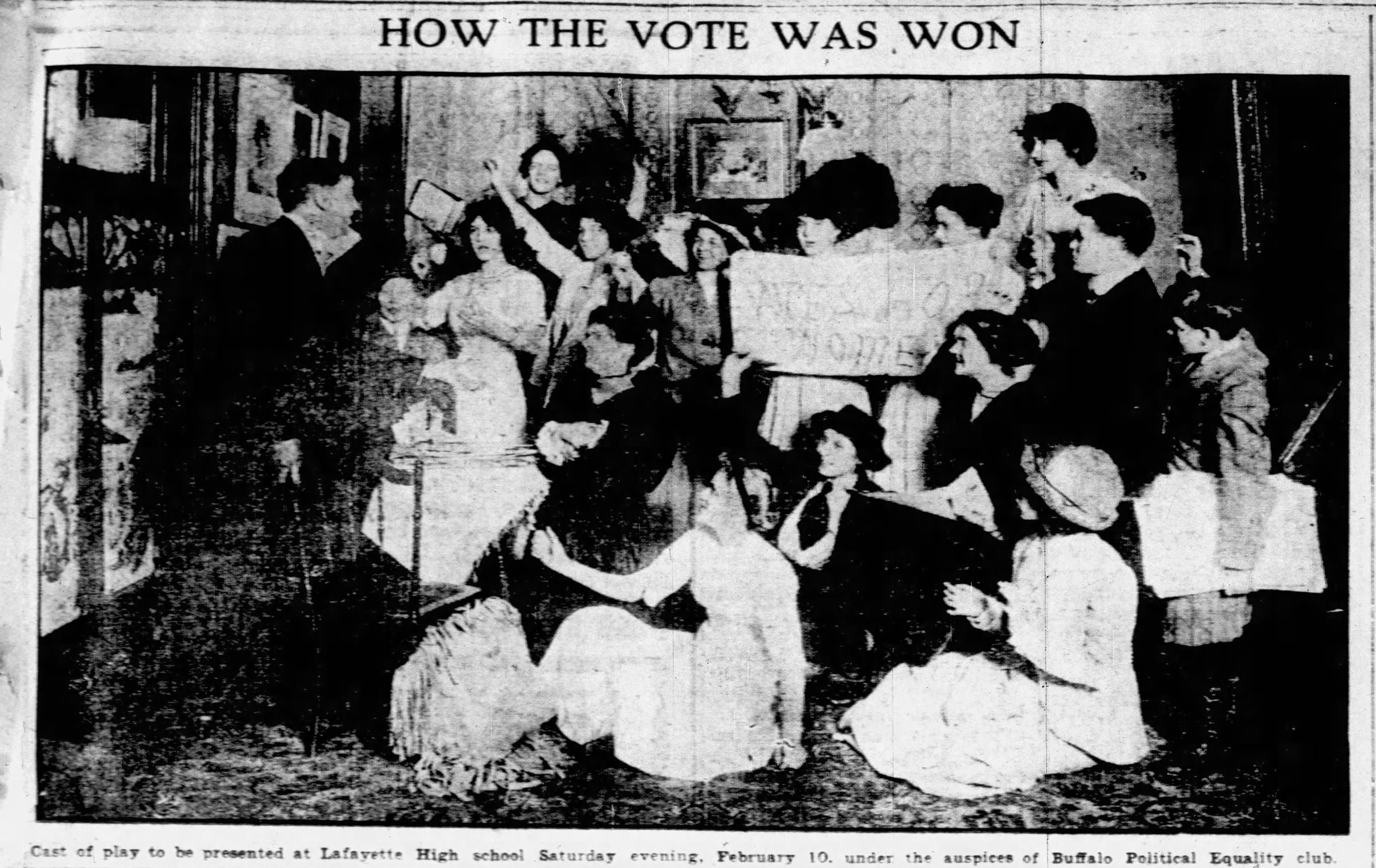
- Cast of a 1912 Buffalo, New York production
- Written by: Cicely Hamilton and Christabel Marshall
- Genre: Suffrage drama

How the Vote Was Won is a one-act play written by Cicely Hamilton and adapted for stage in collaboration with Christabel Marshall. It was first produced in 1909. The play, supporting women's suffrage, was popular in both the United Kingdom and the United States.

== About ==
How the Vote Was Won started out as a short story written by Cicely Hamilton and published by the Women Writers' Suffrage League in 1909. Christabel Marshall and Hamilton later adapted the work as a play. It was first performed in April 1909 at the Royalty Theatre. In 1910, the play was republished in Chicago by Dramatic Publishing.

How the Vote Was Won was written and produced to support the cause of women's suffrage. The one-act play was satirical in nature and could also be considered a farce. It takes place inside the home of a clerk, named Horace Cole, who is an "ill-informed" anti-suffragist. He is visited by his female relatives, some of which represented the major three suffragist groups in Britain: the National Union of Women's Suffrage Societies, the Women's Freedom League and the Women's Social and Political Union. The women are on a labour strike and are demanding food and lodging from their closest relative, Horace. During the play, Horace finds that his views are challenged and later he and his male neighbor go on to demand the right to vote for women. The play centers women as agents of their own change.

== Production and reception ==
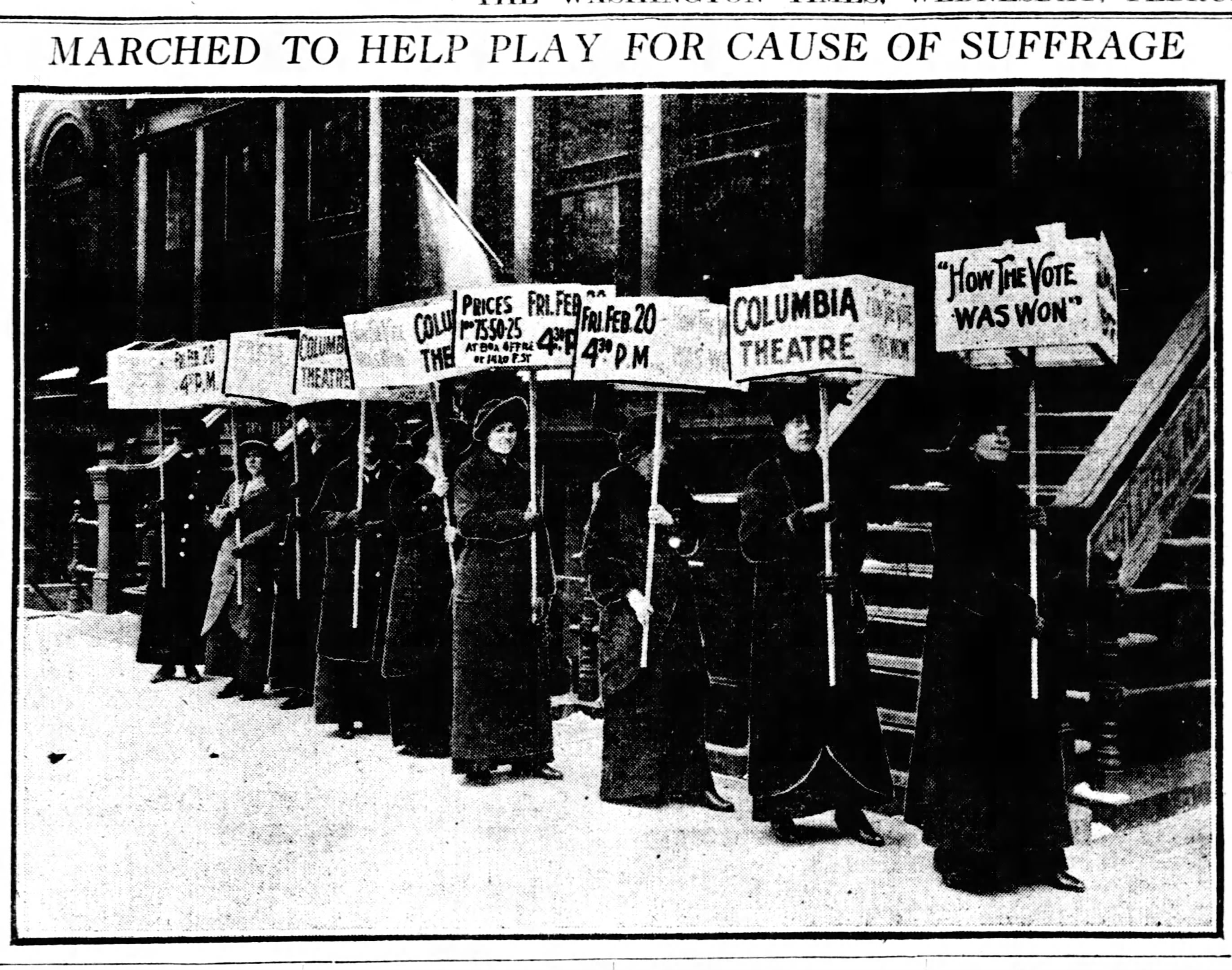
Suffragists advertising the Columbia Theatre production in 1914

The play was performed throughout the United Kingdom between 1909 and 1914, often to crowded houses. It was one of the first major hits for the Actresses' Franchise League (AFL). The last production by the AFL took place on 24 October 1928 at a victory reception for the Equal Political Rights Campaign committee.

It was also a hit in the United States. In 1910, How the Vote Was Won was staged on Broadway at Maxine Elliott's Theatre and featured Beatrice Forbes-Robertson Hale and Fola La Follette. Hale organized the show and the larger event it was part of as a fundraiser for the Equality League of Self-Supporting Women. In 1911, the play was staged in Chicago to benefit the Illinois Equal Suffrage Association. In 1914, it played at the Columbia Theatre and featured Edith J. Goode.

Critics generally enjoyed the play, finding it humorous. The Woman's Journal called it "extremely significant, and even prophetic."

== See also ==
- Suffrage drama
- Women's suffrage in film
