= Time and Tide (magazine) =

Defunct British magazine

- Time and Tide cover from 1965
- Editor: Helen Archdale 1920, Margaret, Lady Rhondda 1920–1958, John Thompson, 1960s, Alexander Chancellor 1980s
- Categories: Feminist then Christian political and art magazine
- Frequency: Weekly then monthly from 1970.
- First issue: 1920; 106 years ago
- Final issue: 1986; 40 years ago
- Country: United Kingdom
- Language: English
- ISSN: 0040-7828

Time and Tide was a British weekly (and later monthly) political and literary review magazine founded by Margaret, Lady Rhondda, in 1920. It started as a supporter of left-wing and feminist causes and the mouthpiece of the feminist Six Point Group. It later moved to the right along with the views of its owner. It always supported and published literary talent.

The first issue was published on 14 May 1920 and the editor was Helen Archdale. Lady Rhondda took over as editor in 1926 and remained so until her death in 1958.

Contributors included Nancy Astor, Vera Brittain, John Brophy, Anthony Cronin (literary editor of the magazine 1956–1958), E. M. Delafield, Crystal Eastman, Leonora Eyles, Graham Greene, Charlotte Haldane, Mary Hamilton, J. M. Harvey, Winifred Holtby, Cicely Hamilton, Octavia Wilberforce, Storm Jameson, C. S. Lewis, Wyndham Lewis, Rose Macaulay, Naomi Mitchison, Eric Newton, George Orwell, Elizabeth Robins, George Bernard Shaw, Helena Swanwick, Rebecca West, Ellen Wilkinson, Charles Williams, Virginia Woolf and Ilse Barea-Kulcsar,

While there are no definite numbers confirming circulation of the magazine, in its first year it sold between 5,000 and 10,000 copies per week with an estimated increase to between 12,000 and 15,000 in the 1920s and 30,000 during World War II.

The bestselling comic novel by E.M. Delafield, Diary of a Provincial Lady, began as a serial in Time and Tide, from December 1929 onwards. It was published as a book in 1930 and has not been out of print since. Delafield became internationally famous and wrote three sequels.

In 1940, the article "The Necessity of Chivalry" by C. S. Lewis was published in Time and Tide, beginning an association between Lewis and the magazine that would last 20 years and include more articles and reviews. In 1944, Lewis's articles "Democratic Education" and "The Parthenon and the Optative" were published, while "Hedonics" appeared in 1945. In 1946, the magazine published Lewis's articles "Different Tastes in Literature" and "Period Criticism". In 1954, Lewis published one of the first reviews of J. R. R. Tolkien's The Fellowship of the Ring, and in 1955 his reviews of The Two Towers and The Return of the King were published. Lewis also frequently contributed poetry, including his poem "The Meteorite" (7 December 1946), which he used as the motto for his book Miracles (1947).

Another significant contributor was Lewis's friend and fellow Oxford "Inkling" Charles Williams, who contributed regularly from 1937 until he died in 1945. His important articles included a review of the "B" text of W. B. Yeats's A Vision (1937) and an exposition of his own Arthurian sequence of poems, Taliessin Through Logres (1938).

In 1956, Time and Tide and André Deutsch published a hardbound book collection of favourite writings titled Time & Tide Anthology, with an introduction by Rhondda and edited by Anthony Lejeune.

With Rhondda's death in 1958, it passed to the control of Rev Timothy Beaumont and editor John Thompson in March 1960. Under their supervision, it became a political news-magazine with a Christian flavour during the 1960s. It, however, continued to lose £600 a week and, in June 1962, he sold it to Brittain Publishing Company, where it was continued by W. J. Brittain. It became a monthly in 1970, and then ceased publication in 1979.

The Time and Tide title was later purchased by Sidgwick and Jackson, a subsidiary of the hotel group Trust House Forte. It was resurrected as a quarterly from 1984 to 1986, edited from their global headquarters in London by Alexander Chancellor and propped up by a very wealthy peer, Lord Forte of Ripley.
