= Cicely Hamilton =

English actress, writer and suffragist (1872–1952)

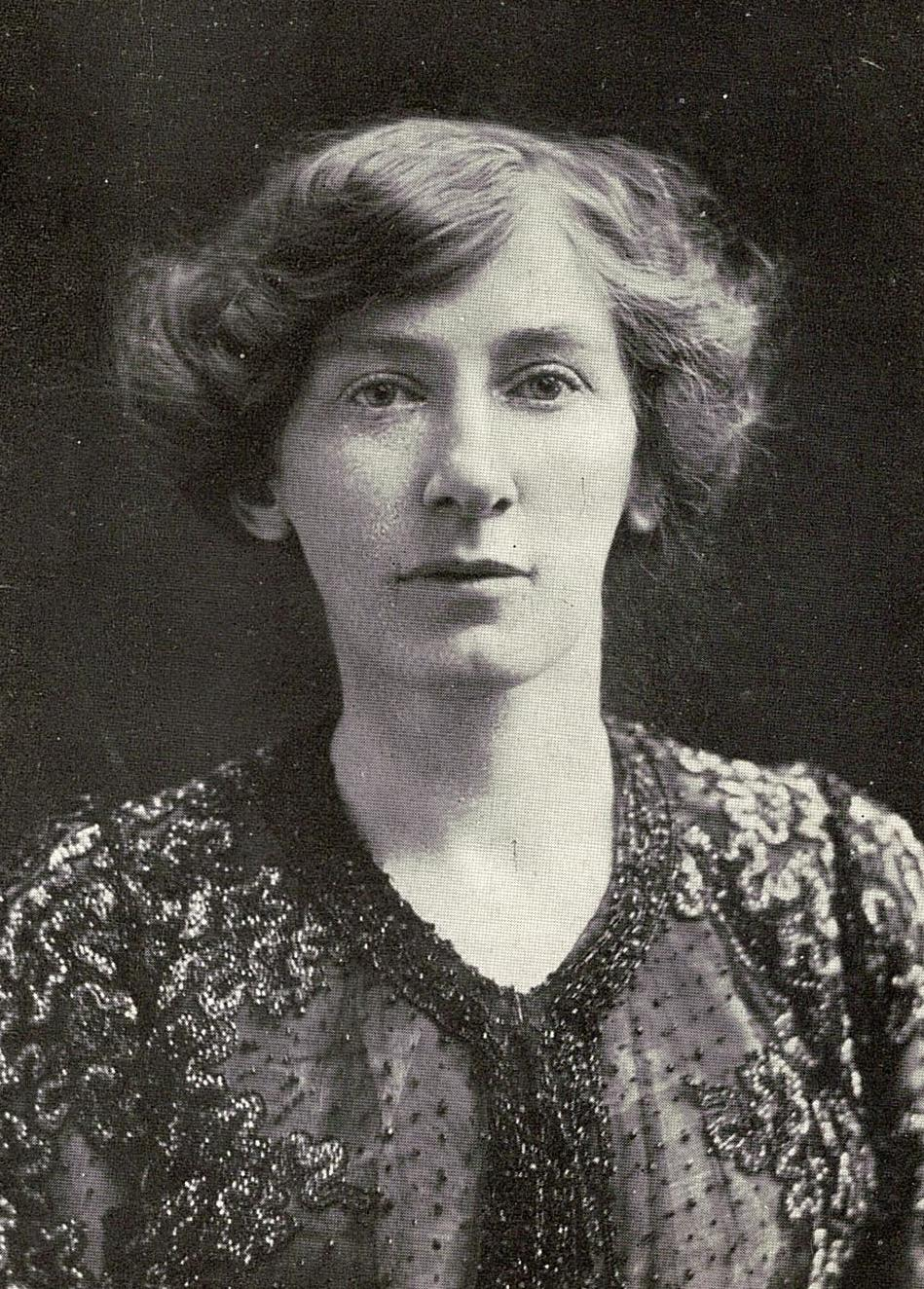
- Cicely Hamilton, c. 1907
- Born: Cicely Mary Hammill; 15 June 1872; Paddington, London, England
- Died: 6 December 1952 (aged 80)
- Occupations: Actor, playwright, novelist
- Known for: Suffragette, event organiser

Cicely Mary Hamilton (née Hammill; 15 June 1872 – 6 December 1952), was an English actress, writer, journalist, suffragist and feminist, part of the struggle for women's suffrage in the United Kingdom. She is now best known for the feminist play How the Vote Was Won, which sees a male anti-suffragist change his mind when the women in his life go on strike. She was also the author of one of the most frequently performed suffrage plays, A Pageant of Great Women (1909), which featured the character of Jane Austen as one of its "Learned Women."

== Biography ==
Born in 1872, as Cicely Hammill in Paddington, London, she was the eldest of the four children of Maude Mary and Denzil Hammil. She was educated in Malvern, Worcestershire and in Bad Homburg vor der Höhe. Hammill was raised by foster parents because her mother had gone missing. After a short spell in teaching, she acted in a touring company. She took the pseudonym "Cicely Hamilton" out of consideration for her family. Then, she wrote drama, including feminist themes, and enjoyed a period of success in commercial theatre. Hamilton was praised for her acting in a performance of Fanny's First Play by George Bernard Shaw.

In 1908, she and Bessie Hatton founded the Women Writers' Suffrage League. This grew to around 400 members, including Ivy Compton-Burnett, Sarah Grand, Violet Hunt, Marie Belloc Lowndes, Alice Meynell, Olive Schreiner, Evelyn Sharp, May Sinclair, and Margaret L. Woods. It produced campaigning literature, written by Sinclair amongst others, and recruited many prominent male supporters.

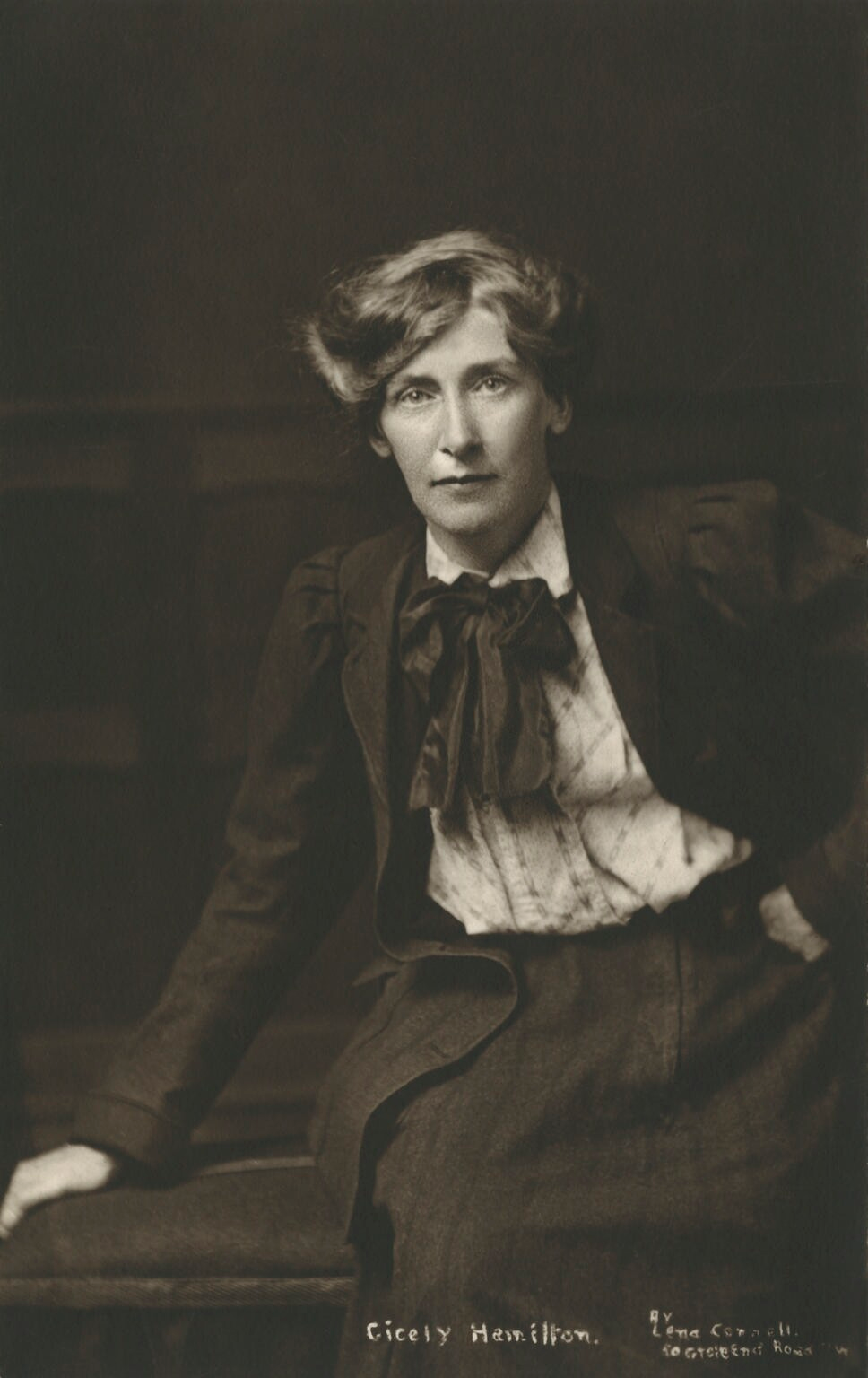
Photo by Lena Connell from the 1910s

Hamilton supplied the lyrics of "The March of the Women", the song which Ethel Smyth composed in 1910 for the Women's Social and Political Union, was first performed at an 'At Home' in Suffolk Street Galleries, Pall Mall to celebrate the release of women violently arrested on Black Friday; it had suitably stirring lyrics for such an occasion:

Shout, shout up with your song!
Cry with the wind for the dawn is breaking.
March, march swing you along,
Wide blows our banner and hope is waking,
Sing with its story, dreams with their glory,
Lo! They call and glad is their word!
Forward! Hark how it swells
Thunder and freedom, the voice of the Lord!

In the days before radio, one effective way to get a message out into society and to have it discussed was to produce short plays that could be performed around the country, and so suffrage drama was born. Elizabeth Robins's "Votes for Women" and Cicely Hamilton and Christopher St. John's "How the Vote Was Won" are two predominant examples of the genre. Hamilton also wrote "A Pageant of Great Women", a highly successful women's suffrage play based on the ideas of her friend, the theatre director Edith Craig. Hamilton played 'Woman' while Craig played the painter Rosa Bonheur, one of the 50 or so great women in the play. Lena Connell's photographs of the leading players were sold to assist the suffrage cause and Connell exhibited the pictures at the Royal Photographic Society in 1910–11. The play was produced all over the UK from 1909 until the First World War. Hamilton was a member of Craig's theatre society, the Pioneer Players. Her play "Jack and Jill and a Friend "was one of the three plays in the Pioneer Players' first production in May 1911. Hamilton inspired young schoolgirls, supportive of suffrage, like Winifred Starbuck, who had Hamilton and other leaders' pictures on her desk in purple, white and green frames and later herself protested by school disorder, such as graffiti and hiding the school registers and handbell, as a milder form of resistance to authority for women's suffrage.

During World War I, Hamilton initially worked in the organisation of nursing care, with the Scottish Women's ambulance service near Paris, and then joined the army as an auxiliary. Later she formed a repertory company to entertain the troops. After the war, she wrote as a freelance journalist, particularly on birth control, and was a press officer for the Geneva International Suffrage Conference and as a playwright for the Birmingham Repertory Company. When Lena Ashwell Players Ltd was formed in 1923, Hamilton was one of the directors. The other three were Lena Ashwell, Esme Church and Marion Fawcett, who were the company's theatre managers.

Hamilton was a regular contributor to Time and Tide magazine, and an active member of the feminist Six Point Group, campaigning for the rights of children, widows and unmarried mothers; equal guardianship of children, and equal pay in teaching and civil service. In 1938, she was given a Civil List pension. She was a friend of E. M. Delafield and is thought to be the model for "Emma Hay" in Delafield's "Provincial Lady" books.

Hamilton's "Theodore Savage" (1922, vt. Lest Ye Die 1928) is a science-fiction novel about a Britain devastated by a war. She also contributed many pieces to juvenile story papers published by the Amalgamated Press, often under the pen name 'Max Hamilton'; under the latter, she became the first female writer to pen a story featuring the detective Sexton Blake in a 1906 issue of The Union Jack.

Hamilton's autobiography "Life Errant" was published in 1935. She died in Chelsea in 1952.

Diana of Dobson's was revived by Mint Theater Company in 2001 in New York City. It was revived again by Orange Tree Theatre in Richmond in 2007, with a cast including Edward Bennett. The Finborough Theatre staged the first London production of Hamilton's play "Just to Get Married" in over 100 years in July 2017. It received positive reviews (4 stars) from The Times, The Observer, The Evening Standard and The New York Times. Mint Theater Company announced the revival of Phyl at Theatre Row in New York City in 2026.

== Works ==
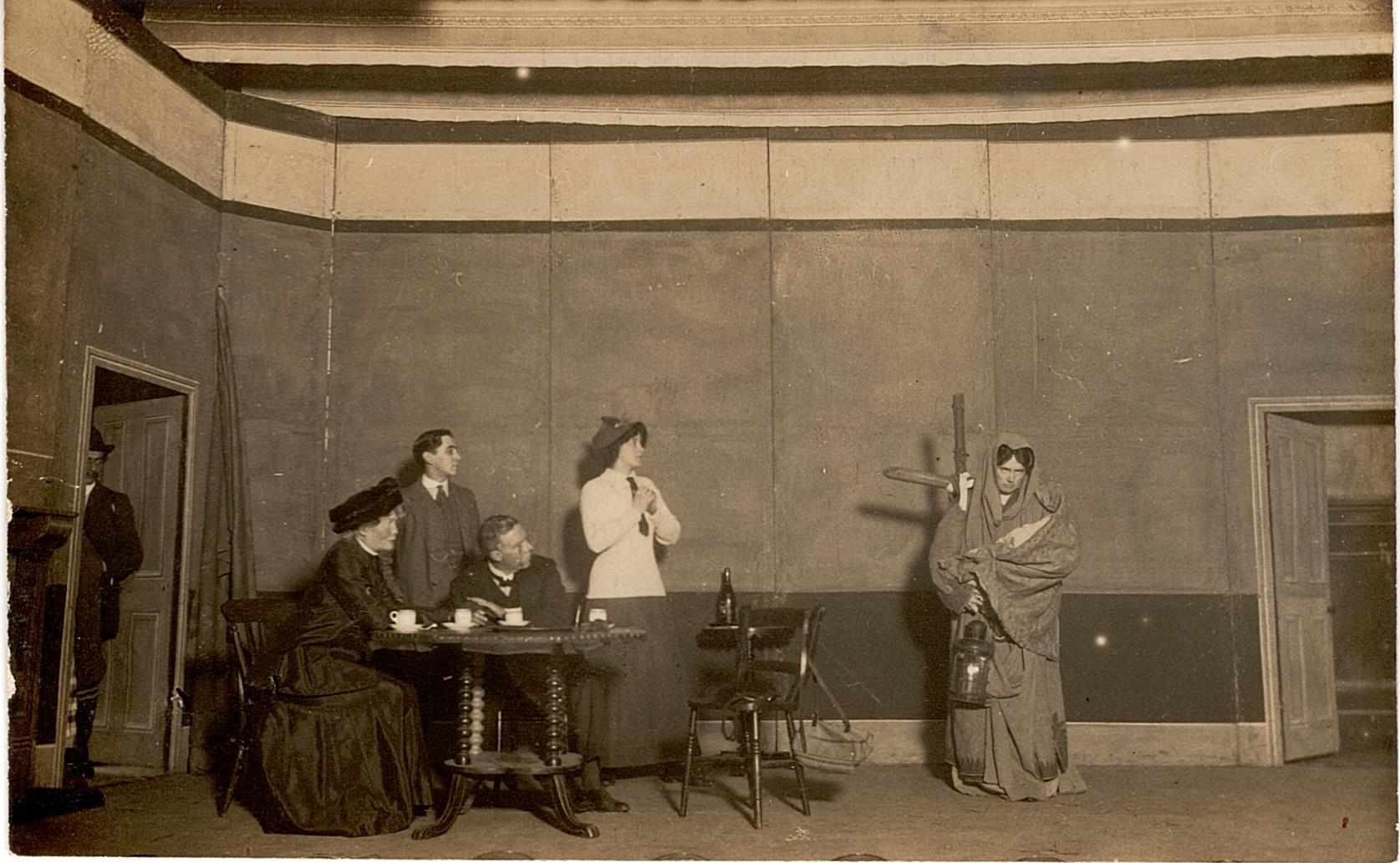
Probably the play 'A Pageant of Great Women' performed by the Actresses' Franchise League.

- The Traveller Returns (1906) play
- Diana of Dobson's (novel, play 1908)
- Women's Votes (1908)
- Marriage as a Trade (1909)
- How the Vote Was Won (1909) play
- A Pageant of Great Women (1910) play
- Just to Get Married (1911) play
- Jack and Jill and a Friend (1911) play
- Phyl (1911) play
- Lady Noggs (1912) play
- William - an Englishman (1919) novel (Reprinted by Persephone Books in 1999)
- The Child in Flanders: A Nativity Play (1922)
- Theodore Savage: A Story of the Past or the Future (1922)
- The Old Adam (1924) play
- Non-Combatant (1924)
- The Human Factor (1925)
- The Old Vic (1926) with Lilian Baylis
- Lest Ye Die (1928)
- Modern Germanies, as seen by an Englishwoman (1931)
- Modern Italy, as seen by an Englishwoman (1932)
- Modern France, as seen by an Englishwoman (1933)
- Little Arthur's History of the Twentieth Century (1933)
- Modern Russia, as seen by an Englishwoman (1934)
- Modern Austria, as seen by an Englishwoman (1935)
- Life Errant (1935) autobiography
- Modern Ireland, as seen by an Englishwoman (1936)
- Modern Scotland, as seen by an Englishwoman (1937)
- Modern England, as seen by an Englishwoman (1938)
- Modern Sweden, as seen by an Englishwoman (1939)
- The Englishwoman (1940)
- Lament for Democracy (1940)
- The Beggar Prince (1944) play
- Holland To-day (1950)
