= Women Writers' Suffrage League =

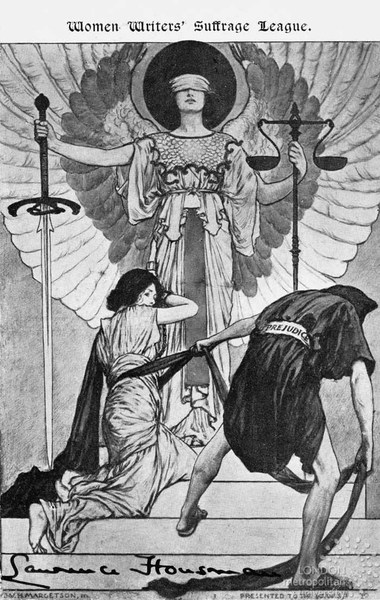
William Henry Margetson

The Women Writers' Suffrage League (WWSL) was an organisation in the United Kingdom formed in 1908 by Cicely Hamilton and Bessie Hatton. The organisation stated that it wanted "to obtain the Parliamentary Franchise for women on the same terms as it is, or may be, granted to men. Its methods are the methods proper to writers – the use of the pen." The organisation viewed itself as a writers' group rather than a literary society. Membership was not based on literary merit, but instead was granted to anyone who had published and sold a written work. Members also paid an annual subscription fee of 2s. 6d. The league was inclusive and welcomed writers of all genders, classes, genres, and political persuasions provided they were in favor of women's suffrage. By 1911 the league was composed of conservatives, liberals and socialists, women of power and women who worked hard and members of the military. The league disbanded on 24 January 1919 following the passing Representation of the People Act in February 1918, granting women over the age of 30 the right to vote.

The offices of the League were located at 55 Bernes St, Oxford St, W.

This group made clear their hatred for androcentrism, reading and revising well known works that marginalised women. They discussed current problems within society and came to a common conclusion; after the meetings they made these problems public so that people would be aware of what was happening. They sought to influence political and social changes through literature.

== Activities ==
The WWSL had members from across the political spectrum, and therefore did not participate in some political demonstrations. Activities of the WWSL included:

- Annual General Meetings
- At-Homes held in members's homes or in hotels and offices, during which the WWSL goals and activities were discussed
- Plays and pageants, together with the Actresses's Franchise League
- Fundraisers, including a bookstall at the Women's Social and Political Union exhibition
- Literary contests for the best suffrage literature
- A library at a military hospital in Endell Street, London, set up by Elizabeth Robins, Bessie Hatton, and Beatrice Harraden.

More than 100 members of the WWSL also marched in the "Great Demonstration" of 21 June 1908, which was organised by the Women's Social and Political Union. Members of the WWSL wore scarlet and white badges with quills. Members also joined marches in July 1910 and June 1911.

== Contributions in newspapers ==
Members of the WWSL contributed to the following newspapers:

- Voting
- Common Cause
- Suffragette
- Votes for Women
- Women's Suffrage News
- Women's Suffrage Journal
- Women's Suffrage
- Women's Franchise
- Women's Dreadnought
- The Independent Suffragette

They also tried to take part in a public debate with the editorials of a conservative newspaper that went against the suffrage. Elizabeth Robins, the League's first president, became famous for her defense of the cause against the anti suffragist Mrs. Humphry Ward in the Times.

== Plays ==
The WWSL gave the following plays together with the Actresses' Franchise League:

- How the Vote was Won
- Votes for Women
- A Pageant of Great Women
- A chat with Mrs Chicky
- Press Cutting

Along with Actresses' Franchise League they composed works, pageants and shows, some to pay tribute to Shakespeare for integrating in his works the qualities of women. One play written by Beatrice Harraden and Bessie Hatton, Shakespeare's Dreams, featured several of Shakespeare's characters (including Portia, Viola, Perdita, Lady Macbeth, Rosalind, Kate, Beatrice, Puck, Ariel, and Cleopatra) coming to the sleeping poet, giving him flowers, and reciting some of their famous lines.

== Ending ==
The Representation of the People Act passed in 1918, granting women over the age of 30 the right to vote. Although this did not meet the stated goal of the WWSL, which was to earn women the right to vote that was equal to the men's right to vote (men over the age of 21 were enfranchised by the Act), the league nevertheless disbanded on 24 January 1918.

== Notable members ==
The WWSL had over 100 members, including several notable female suffrage authors:

- Elizabeth Robins - First President
- Marie Belloc Lowndes - President in 1913.
- Margaret Nevinson - Treasurer
- Cicely Hamilton
- Bessie Hatton
- Beatrice Harraden
- May Sinclair
- Alice Meynell
- Olive Schreiner
- Sarah Grand
- Violet Hunt
- Edith Ayrton
- Edith Ellis
- Evelyn Sharp
- Gertrude Warden
- George Paston
- Madeline Lucette Ryley

The active participation of men, as honorary associates of the league, also differentiated the WWSL from late-twentieth-century feminist literary groups.

== See also ==
- Women's suffrage in the United Kingdom
- Suffrage drama
