= Florence Warden =

English actress and writer

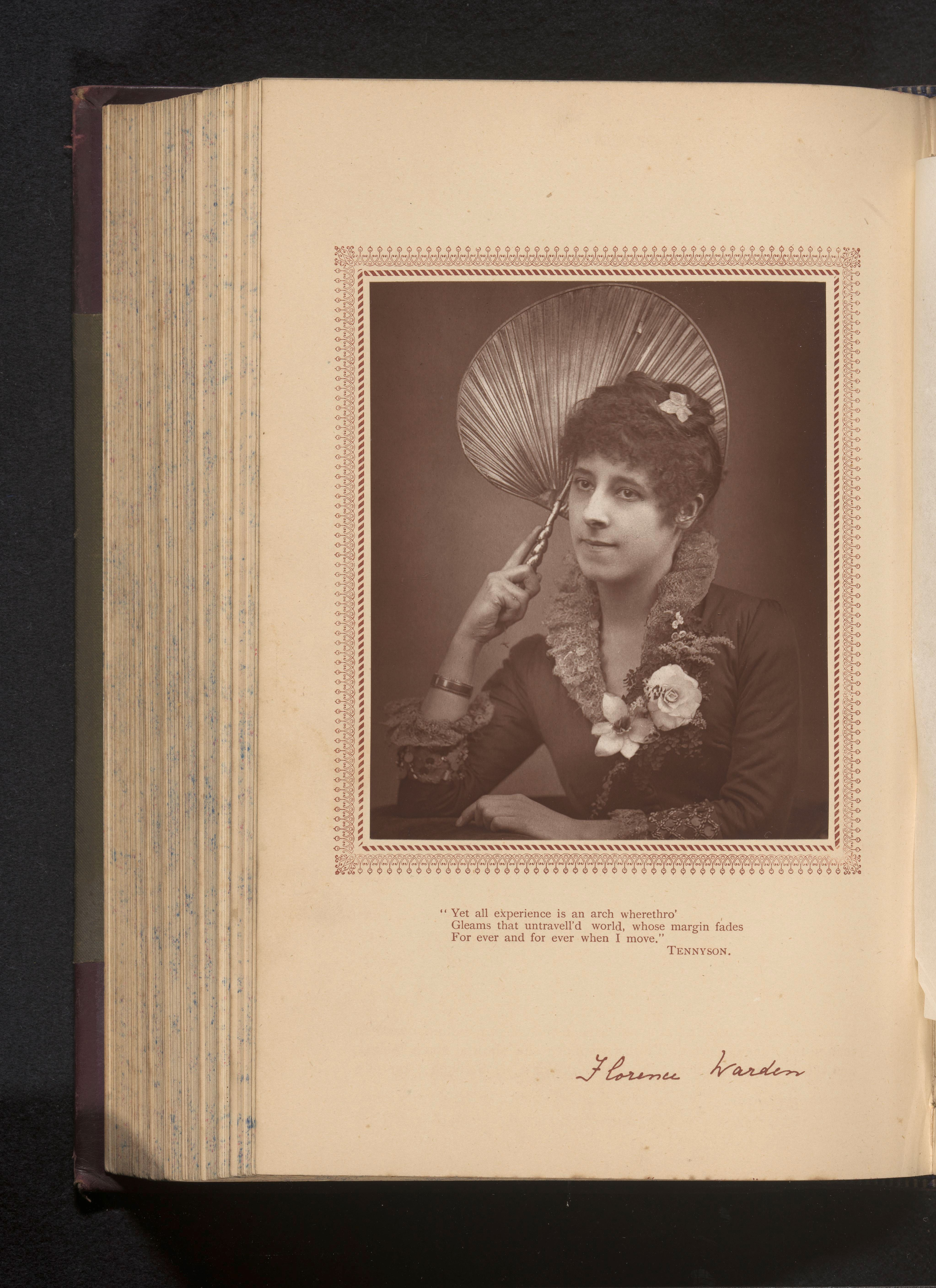
- Born: Florence Alice Price; May 16, 1857; Hanworth, London, England
- Died: May 11, 1929 (aged 71)
- Resting place: Brompton Cemetery
- Occupations: Actress; novelist
- Spouse: George Edward James

Florence Warden (16 May 1857 – 11 May 1929) was an English actress and writer, who wrote many novels under her stage name, her name at birth being Florence Alice Price and her married name Mrs G. E. James.

== Life ==
Warden began life as Florence Alice Price, the daughter of a stockbroker. Born in Hanworth, Middlesex, she was educated in Brighton and France.

In 1877, her first novel, The Wolf at the Door, was published anonymously in Boston, Massachusetts.

From 1880 to 1885, Warden pursued a career as an actress, while she also published stories and novels under her stage name. In 1885, her mystery novel The House on the Marsh (1884) was turned into a play, in which she played the lead. However, Augustus Moore later complained that he had done most of the work of writing the play, but had not been credited, while Charles Percy claimed the plot had been stolen from him.

In 1887, at St Pancras, Warden married George Edward James, an actor. She continued to write novels, but she gave up her acting career. One of her sisters also became a writer, adopting the name Gertrude Warden.

With her husband, Warden had two sons, Godfrey Warden James, born at St Pancras in 1888, and Rupert Warden, born at Ramsgate in 1893; and two daughters, Leslie Gertrude, born in London in 1890, and Olivia Mary, born in Ramsgate, Kent, in 1891.

She lived in Kent for many years, at Ramsgate and later Sandgate.

Florence Warden became a writer of stories for The Gentlewoman, a new magazine established in 1890, and on 15 December 1891 The Times reported that the Christmas number had

...stories, all illustrated in colours, by Mr Farjeon, Mr Grant Allen, Mr Doyle, Lord Brabourne, Miss Florence Warden, Mrs Campbell Praed, Mr Henry Herman, and Mr A. J. Pask.

In 1911, Warden, her husband, and her two daughters were living together in three rooms in Maida Vale, when G. E. James was described as an actor, Warden as a writer, and their daughters as music students. Her attempts to reignite her career as a playwright were unsuccessful.

In 1920, The House on the Marsh was turned into a silent movie, The House on the Marsh.

After her death in 1929, Warden was buried as Florence James in the Brompton Cemetery.

== Children ==
Warden’s son Godfrey Warden James (1888–1963), was educated at Oxford, trained as a barrister, worked as a schoolmaster and tutor and as an Administrative Officer in Sierre Leone, and was also a novelist, using the name Adam Broome. When he died in 1963, he was living at Woking and left a modest estate valued at £5,342, equivalent to £97,572 in 2025.

Warden's son Rupert Warden James (1893-1965) was a sea cadet at the Thames Nautical Training College (HMS Worcester) in the 1911 census. He died at Gosport in 1965.

Warden’s older daughter Leslie Gertrude died unmarried in Westminster in 1956. Her younger daughter Olivia Mary died, also unmarried, in Chelsea in 1982, aged ninety.

== Novels ==
- Anon, The Wolf at the Door (Boston: Roberts Brothers, 1877, in their No Name Series)
- The House on the Sunless Side (1877)
- The White Witch (London: R. Bentley, in three volumes, 1884)
- A Prince of Darkness (London: Ward & Downey, in three volumes, 1884)
- The House on the Marsh: A Romance (London: Appleton, 1884) (filmed in 1920)
- At the World’s Mercy (London: William Stevens, 1884)
- A Dog With a Bad Name (London: Bentley, in two volumes, 1885)
- Deldee; or, The Ward of Waringham (1885)
- Scheherazade: A London Night's Entertainment (London: Ward & Downey, 1887; new edition by Creative Media Partners LLC, 2019)
- Doris's Fortune (London: William Stevens, 1886)
- A Vagrant Wife (1887)
- A Woman’s Face; or, A Lakeland Mystery (London: Ward and Downey, 1888)
- A Witch of the Hills: A Novel (London: Bentley, in two volumes, 1888)
- Nurse Revel's Mistake: A Novel (London: Simpkin, 1889)
- The Fog Princes (London : Ward & Downey, 1889)
- St Cuthbert’s Tower (London: Cassell, 1889)
- City and Suburban (London : F. V. White and Co., 1890)
- Missing: A Young Girl (1890)
- Pretty Miss Smith (London : W. Heinemann, 1891)
- Those Westerton Girls (London : R. Bentley & Son, 1891)
- Sea Mew Abbey (1891)
- A Wilful Ward (F. V. White & Co, 1891)
- Highest References (1891)
- A Modern Sultana: A London Night's Entertainment (London: Phoenix, 1892)
- A Shock to Society (F. V. White & Co, 1892)
- Ralph Ryder of Brent: A Novel (in three volumes, London : R. Bentley & Son, 1892)
- My Child and I: A Woman's Story (F. V. White & Co, 1893)
- A Terrible Family (1893)
- Adela's Ordeal (1893)
- A Laodicean (1893)
- A Wild Wooing (F. V. White & Co, 1893)
- Grave Lady Jane (F. V. White & Co, 1893)
- A Young Wife's Trial (F. V. White & Co, 1893)
- A Passage through Bohemia (1893)
- A Scarborough Romance (F. V. White & Co, 1894)
- A Sensational Case (1894)
- A Perfect Fool; or, Chris's Redemption (F. V. White & Co, 1894)
- A Lady in Black; or, A Mysterious Love Affair (F. V. White & Co, 1895)
- The Mystery of the Inn by the Shore: A Novel (London: R. Bonner’s Sons, 1895)
- A Spoilt Girl (F. V. White & Co, 1895)
- Kitty's Engagement (London : F. V. White & Co, 1895)
- The Woman with the Diamonds (F. V. White & Co, 1895)
- Doctor Darch's Wife (London : F. V. White & Co, 1896)
- Two Lads and a Lass (London : F. V. White & Co, 1896)
- Forge And Furnace (1896)
- Our Widow (F. V. White & Co, 1896)
- Strictly Incog (1896)
- The Wharf By the Docks (1896)
- Dolly the Romp (London : F. V. White & Co, 1897)
- The Mystery of Dudley Horne (London : F. V. White & Co, 1897)
- The Girls at the Grange (London : F. V. White & Co, 1897)
- Girls Will be Girls (F. V. White & Co,1898)
- The Master-Key (London : C. A. Pearson, 1898)
- Joan, the Curate (London: Chatto and Windus, 1898)
- Little Miss Prim (London : F. V. White & Co, 1898)
- A Sensational Case (London: Ward, Lock, 1898)
- The Love That Lasts (1899)
- The Bohemian Girls (F. V. White & Co, 1899)
- A Very Rough Diamond (J. Nisbet & Co, 1899)
- The Secret of Lynndale (F. V. White & Co, 1899)
- The Plain Miss Cray (F. V. White & Co, 1900)
- Town Lady and Country Lass(F. V. White & Co, 1900)
- A Lowly Lover (F. V. White & Co, 1900)
- An Outsider's Year (London : John Long, 1901)
- The Lovely Mrs Pemberton (John Long, 1901)
- Morals and Millions (F. V. White & Co, 1901)
- A House with a History(F. V. White & Co, 1901)
- Once Too Often (London: John Long, 1901)
- A Fight to a Finish (London: Chatto and Windus, 1901)
- Something in the City (1902)
- A Thief in the Night (1902)
- A Desperate Game (1902)
- Lady Joan's Companion (London : Digby, Long & Co, 1902)
- A Hole and Corner Marriage (C. Arthur Pearson, 1902)
- The Mis-rule of Three (1903)
- No. 3 The Square (London : John Long, 1903)
- A Woman's Story (1903)
- An Outsider's Year (1903)
- The Heart of a Girl (London : Chatto & Windus, 1903)
- An Impossible Husband (1904)
- What Ought She to Do? (London : Chatto & Windus, 1904)
- Tom Dawson (1904)
- The House by the River (1905)
- Face in the Flashlight (London : John Long, 1905)
- Cliff's End Farm (London : F. V. White & Co, 1905)
- The Youngest Miss Brown (1905)
- Playing the Knave (1905)
- Who was Lady Thurne? (London : John Long, 1905)
- Love and Lordship (1906)
- The Old House at the Corner (Chatto and Windus, 1906)
- The Real Mrs Daybrook (London : John Long, 1906)
- The Financier's wife (1906)
- Law Not Justice (London : Hurst & Blackett, 1906)
- The Heiress of Densley Wold (1907)
- The Man with the Amber Eyes (1907)
- Mad Sir Geoffrey (1907)
- The Marriage Broker (1907)
- The White Countess (1907)
- My Lady of Whims (1907)
- The Heiress of Densley Wold (London : Cassell & Co, 1907)
- A Life's Arrears (1908)
- The Baronet's Wife (1908)
- The Veiled Lady (1908)
- A Devil's Bargain (1908)
- The Case of Sir Geoffrey (1908)
- The Millionaire's Son (London : Ward, Lock & Co, 1908)
- The Socialism of Lady Jim (London : Digby, Long & Co, 1908)
- Lady Lee (1908)
- Lady Anne's Trustee (London : F. V. White & Co, 1908)
- The Half-Smart Set (London : John Milne, 1908)
- The Empress of the Andes (1909)
- A Society Scare (1909)
- Lord Rodway's Ordeal (1909)
- The Dazzling Miss Davison (1910) (Filmed in 1917)
- When the Devil Drives (1910)
- Miss Ferriby's Clients (1910)
- Lord Quare's Visitor (1910)
- The Colonel's Past (1910)
- Wedded, but Not a Wife (F.V. White, 1911)
- The Farm in the Hills (London : Sands & Co, 1911)
- The Right Sort (1911)
- The Matheson Money (1912)
- Lord Petworth's Daughter (1912)
- The Bad Lord Lockington (John Long, 1912)
- The Mesmeric Lady (1912)
- Mollie the Handful (F. V. White, 1912)
- A Mystery of the Thames (1913)
- Abbots Moat (F.V.White, 1913)
- A Blindman's Marriage (1913)
- Cross-fires (1914)
- The Little Grey Mouse (1915)
- The Wraith of Olverstone (London : Ward, Lock & Co, 1916)
- The Light in the Upper Storey (1917)
- The Good Ship Dove (1919)
- A Night Surprise (1919)
- Ursula: Saga (1919)
- The Grey Moth (1920)
- The Harlingham Case (1921)
- Sir Julian's Crime (1921)
- The Lady in Furs (London; Melbourne : Ward, Lock & Co, 1922)
- The Girl Who Waited (1922)
- The Precipice (1923)
- The Girls at the Cottage (London; Melbourne : Ward, Lock & Co, 1924)
- Serle's Secret

== Plays ==
- The House on the Marsh (1885)
- In the Lion's Mouth (1885)
- Uncle Mike(1893)
- The Guinea Pigs (1899)
- A Patched up Affair (1900)
- Parlez-vous francais (1906)
- The Case for the Lady (1909)
- Dolly's Weekend; or, A Tale of a Speaking Tube, a comedy on one act (1911)
- The Verekers (1923)
