= Joshua Hatton =

English writer & poet (1850–1920)

Joshua Hatton (8 June 1850 in Chesterfield, Derbyshire – 1920) was an English writer, poet and editor, the brother of Joseph Hatton, editor of The People. His exact date of death in late 1920 is uncertain, but it was reported at the beginning of 1921. He was aged 70.

== Reputation ==
Hatton commonly used the pseudonym Guy Roslyn, although he is more often regarded by that name as a bogus biographer reduced to poverty and begging from the subjects of his biographies in his later life.

== Works ==
Poetry and novels

- Daphnis the Unfaithful: a poetic romance, London: John Camden Hotten, 1870
- George Eliot in Derbyshire. Gossip on passages and characters in her novels, London, 1876
- Lyrics and Landscapes, etc., London/Perth, 1878
- Village Verses, etc., London/Plymouth, 1876

Editor

- The Biograph, and Review, London: E. W. Allen, 1879–1882
- The New Monthly Magazine and Literary Journal, London: Henry Colburn and Co., to 1882
