= Joseph Hatton =

English novelist and journalist (1837–1907)

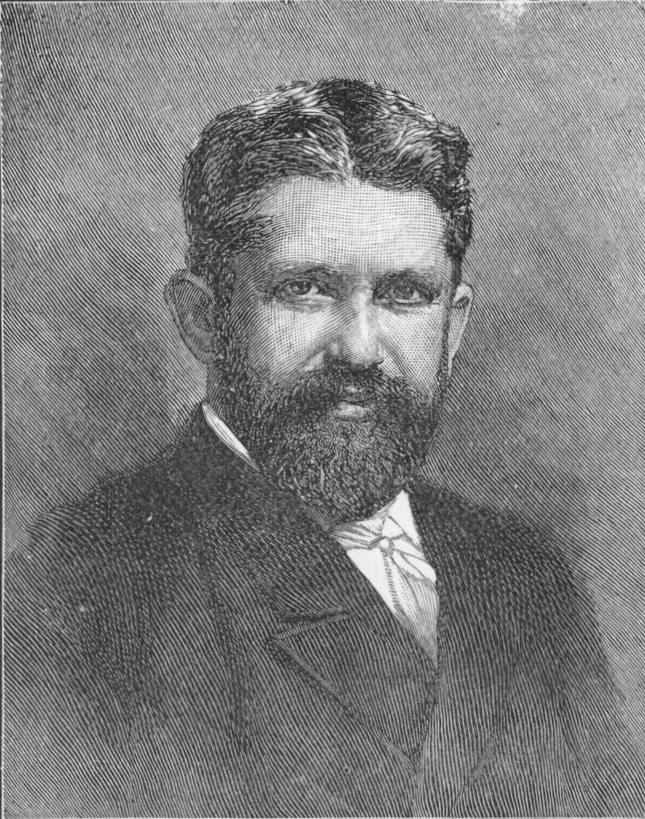
Joseph Hatton

Joseph Paul Christopher Hatton (3 February 1837 – 31 July 1907) was an English novelist and journalist. He was editor of many English publications including The Sunday Times from 1874 to 1881 and then served as a correspondent for several American periodicals.

== Life and work ==
Hatton was born and baptised in Andover, Hampshire, on 22 March 1837, but his parents, Francis Augustus and Mary Ann Hatton, moved to Chesterfield when he was young. Francis Hatton founded the Derbyshire Times in 1854. Hatton studied at Bowker's school and then studied law, becoming a clerk in the office of William Waller. He married Louisa Howard Johnson (d. 1900) in 1856 and they would have three children including the artist Helen Howard Hatton, writer Bessie Lyle Hatton, and explorer Frank Hatton. From 1861 he began to write starting with provincial papers and two years later he became an editor for the Bristol Mirror. His brother Joshua Hatton was also a journalist. He then went on to edit The Gentleman's Magazine, The Illustrated Midland News and other publications produced by Messrs. Grant & Co. He retired from the company in 1874 and worked as a London correspondent for The New York Times, The Sydney Morning Herald, and the Kreuz-Zeitung. He also edited The Sunday Times.

Hatton travelled to America in 1881 and began to write about the country and during the tour he covered the assassination of James A. Garfield in The Standard, scooping other English newspapers. He was a member of the Garrick Club and was a friend of Henry Irving and J. L. Toole. He joined Irving to North America in 1883 and published tour notes. After the death of his son Frank Hatton in Borneo, he wrote a biographical sketch and published his travel memoirs in 1886. He also published several novels including Clytie (1874), By Order of the Czar (1890), and When Rogues Fall Out (1899).

Hatton died in St John's Wood, Middlesex, at the age of 70 and was buried in Marylebone cemetery.

== Works ==
=== Editor ===
- Bristol Mirror
- The Gentleman's Magazine
- School Board Chronicle
- Illustrated Midland News
- The Sunday Times
- The People (1892)

=== Plays ===
- By Order of the Czar. A drama in five acts, London: Hutchinson & Co., 1904 (adaptation of his eponymous novel)
- Romantic Caroline, adapted from a play by Théodore Barrière and Lambert-Thiboust

=== Novels (incomplete) ===
In title order:

- Bitter Sweets: a Love Story, London, 1865
- By Order of the Czar. A Novel, New York: John W. Lovell, 1890
- Captured by Cannibals. Some incidents in the life of Horace Duran, London: Hodder & Stoughton, 1888
- Christopher Henrick: his Life and Adventures London, 1869
- Cigarette Papers for after dinner smoking Anthony Treherne & Co.: London, 1902
- Clytie: a Novel of Modern Life London, Guildford, 1874
- Cruel London London, 1878
- The Dagger and the Cross London: Hutchinson & Co., 1897
- The Gay World London: Hurst & Blackett, 1877
- In Male Attire: a Romance of the Day London: Hutchinson & Co., 1900
- In the Lap of Fortune. A story stranger than fiction. London, 1873
- John Needham's Double, London: John & Robert Maxwell, 1885 (also a play, 1891)
- Kites and Pigeons London, 1872
- The Park Lane Mystery: a Story of Love and Magic London, 1887
- The Princess Mazaroff. A romance London: Hutchinson & Co., 1891
- The Queen of Bohemia London, 1877
- The Tallants of Barton: A Tale of Fortune and Finance, London: Tinsley Brothers, 1867
- The Valley of Poppies London: Chapman and Hall, 1871
- Three Recruits, and the girls they left behind them London : Hurst & Blackett, 1880
- The Old House at Sandwich, 1892
- When Rogues Fall Out, London: C. Arthur Peterson Limited, 1899
- The White King of Manoa, London: Hutchinson & Co., 1899
- Contribution to The Fate of Fenella, 1892

=== Non-fiction ===
- Henry Irving's Impression of America, Boston: James R Osgood, 1884
- North Borneo: Explorations and Adventures on the Equator [with son, Frank Hatton], London: Sampson Low, 1885

Media offices
Preceded by Edmund Scale	Editor of The Sunday Times; 1874–1881	Succeeded by Neville Bruce
Preceded by Harry Benjamin Vogel	Editor of The People; 1900–1907	Succeeded by ?
