= The House on the Marsh =

1920 film directed by Fred Paul

The House on the Marsh is a 1920 British silent crime film directed by Fred Paul and starring Cecil Humphreys, Peggy Patterson and Harry Welchman. It follows a Governess who unmasks the owner of her house as a criminal. It was based on an 1884 melodramatic novel by Florence Warden.

== Cast ==
- Cecil Humphreys – Gervas Rayner
- Peggy Patterson – Violet Christie
- Harry Welchman – Laurence Reed
- Frank Stanmore – Reverend Golightly
- Madge Tree – Sarah Gooch
- Mary Godfrey – Miss Rayner
