= Gertrude Warden =

English actress and writer (1859–1925)

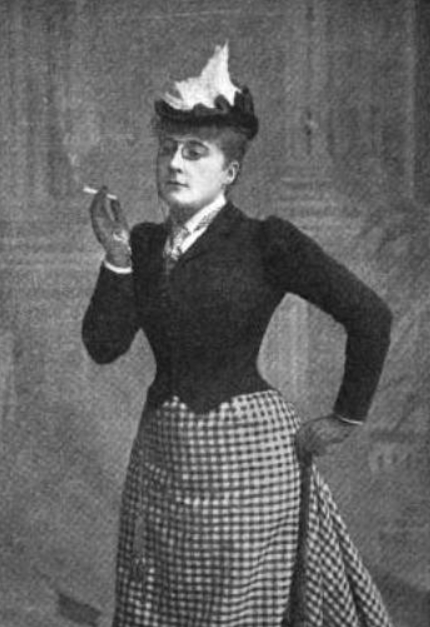
- As Victoria Vivash in the 1894 play The New Woman
- Born: Gertrude Isobel Price; 27 May 1859; Brixton, London, England
- Died: 3 May 1925 (aged 65); Monaco
- Occupations: Actress, writer
- Spouses: John Wilton Jones (m. 1889; died 1897) Auguste Devot de Quillacq (m. 1899)

Gertrude Warden (27 May 1859 – 3 May 1925) was an English actress and writer, who wrote over 30 novels under her stage name, her name at birth being Gertrude Isobel Price and her married name Mrs John Wilton Jones.

== Life ==
Warden began life as Gertrude Isobel Price, the daughter of a stockbroker. Born in Brixton on 27 May 1859, she was educated in Brighton and France. After a brief stint as a governess, Warden became an actress, working in both the London and provincial theatres, as well as touring America with Lillie Langtry. She performed in Judah at the Shaftesbury Theatre with Bessie Hatton in 1890. She married John Wilton Jones, (Note: Jones, generally referred to as "Wilton Jones" or "J. Wilton Jones", wrote A Yorkshire Lass for Mary Eastlake, also On an Island, A Scapegoat and a pantomime Babes in the Wood in which Robin Hood made an appearance.) an actor and writer in 1889, and the couple collaborated on plays together, but he died in 1897. She remarried Auguste Devot de Quillacq in 1899. She was a member of the Women Writers' Suffrage League (WWSL) and on the executive committee of the Actors' Orphanage Fund.

One of her sisters also became a writer, adopting the name Florence Warden.

Gertrude spent her later years in France. She died in Monaco on 3 May 1925.

== Selected works ==
- The White Witch (London: R. Bentley, in three volumes, 1884)
- As a Bird to the Snare (Bristol: Arrowsmith, in one volume, 1888)
- The Dark Arches: A Romance of Three Lives (London: John Dicks, in one volume, 1890)
- The Murder of the Moors (Household Words, Christmas 1890)
- About Amateurs (Judy's Annual, 1891)
- The Haunted House at Kew (London: William Stevens, in one volume, 1893)
- A Hawk in the Nest (The Young Ladies Journal, 1893)
- The Gray Wolf's daughter (The Young Ladies Journal, 1894)
- Half a Million (1894)
- The Race for Love
- The Secret of a Letter (The Young Ladies Journal, 1894)
- Five Old Maids: A Story of the South Coast (London: William Stevens, in one volume, 1895)
- A Waiting Game (1895)
- A Secret Foe (The Young Ladies Journal, 1895)
- Sadie (1895)
- The Sentimental Sex (London: John Lane, in one volume, 1896)
- Her Fairy Prince (London: William Stevens, in one volume, 1896)
- Nobody's Widow (Household Words, June 1896)
- A French Witch; or, Two Ways of Wooing (New York: The Federal Book Company, 1896)
- The Wooing of a Fairy (London: Hurst and Blackett, in one volume, 1897)
- An Angel of Evil (London: William Stevens, in one volume, 1897)
- Made for Each Other (Household Words, September 1897)
- The Heart of a Hero (1899)
- Her Faithful Knight; or, For Phyllis' Sake (New York: Street and Smith, 1899)
- Stage Love and True Love: A Story of the Theatre (London: William Stevens, in one volume, 1900)
- A Phantom in the Fog (1900)
- A Syndicate of Sinners (London: Digby, Long, in one volume, 1901)
- A Poor Girl's Passion; or The Crime of Monte Carlo (London: William Stevens, in one volume, 1901)
- Scoundrel or Saint (London: Digby, Long, 1902)
- Set to Partners (1902)
- A Fortunate Engagement
- A Selfish Little Woman (1902)
- Beyond the Law (1902)
- Compromised with Harold E. Gorst. (1902)
- A Sweet Little Lady; or, A Romance of the Channel Islands (1902)
- The Stolen Pearl: A Romance of London (1903) with Robert Eustace
- Beauty in Distress (London: Digby, Long and Co., 1903)
- Nobody's Widow (London: Digby, Long and Co., 1903)
- The Game of Love (London: Digby, Long, 1904)
- Dancing Leaves (1905)
- A Heart of Stone (London: Digby, Long and Co., 1905)
- Robert the Devil (London: Digby, Long and Co., 1906)
- The Nut-Browne Mayd: A Riviera Mystery (1907)
- The Moth and the Footlights (London: Digby, Long, Co., 1906)
- The Grey Sister (1906)
- A Crime in the Alps (1908)
- Actress's Husband (1908)
- The World, the Flesh and the Casino (1909)
- Severn Affair (London: John Long, 1909)
- Stand and Deliver! The Adventures of a Clever Woman (1910)
- Haunted (1911)
- The Woman who Tempted (London : Ward, Lock & Co, 1912)
- The Path of Virtue: A Romance of the Musical Comedy Stage (F. V. White, 1912)
- Diana of Dartmoor (London: Digby, Long and Co., 1913)
- Two Girls and a Saint (1915)
- 'Romance of a Confetti' Derby Daily Telegraph (Saturday 30 July 1927)
- Maison Hantee (1927)
- In Spite of Proof
- Whose was the crime?
- A Stage Heroine; or, In the Glare of the Footlights
