= Elin Améen =

Swedish author (1852–1913)

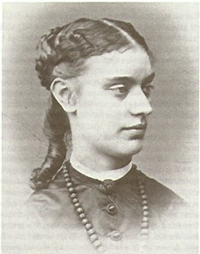
- Portrait of the author
- Born: 22 July 1852; Karlskrona, Sweden
- Died: 17 June 1913 (aged 60); Stockholm, Sweden
- Occupation: author
- Writing career
- Pen name: EA, Elisa, Lina and Mn

Elin Améen (22 July 1852 – 17 June 1913) was a Swedish author.

== Biography ==
Améen was born in 1852 in Karlskrona to Vilhelmina and Georg Améen, as one of three children, having two brothers. Her father Georg was a prominent government official and publisher. Améen made her writing debut in 1885 with short stories published in the book Träldom och andra berättelser och skisser (Bondage and other stories and sketches) published by the Albert Bonniers company, though it did not sell well. Despite the poor sales of her book, she was appointed to the new women's cultural organisation Sällskapet Nya Idun (The New Idun Society), a women's counterpart to the men's club Sällskapet Idun (The Idun Society).

In 1891 Améen's first successful work, Lifsmål (Life Goals), a collection of stories and sketches, was published. Lifsmål included the short story Befriad (Freed) which was also published in the magazine Ur dagens krönika. Befriad was later turned into a successful play in English called Alan's Wife by the American actress Elizabeth Robins, which Améen had translated back into Swedish and staged eventually at the Royal Dramatic Theater in Stockholm. Améen subsequently wrote the collections Frihet (Freedom), "Bergtagen" och andra berättelser och skisser ("Bergtagen" and other stories and sketches), Margareta, En sommardröm (A summer dream), En sommarsaga (A summer story), Grevinnan Dora (Countess Dora), and Skilsmässa (Divorce). Améen was also published extensively in the Swedish press under the pen names EA, Elisa, Lina and Mn.

Améen suffered ill health for most of her life, particularly in her final decade. She died in Stockholm in 1913.
