= When Rogues Fall Out =

1899 crime novel

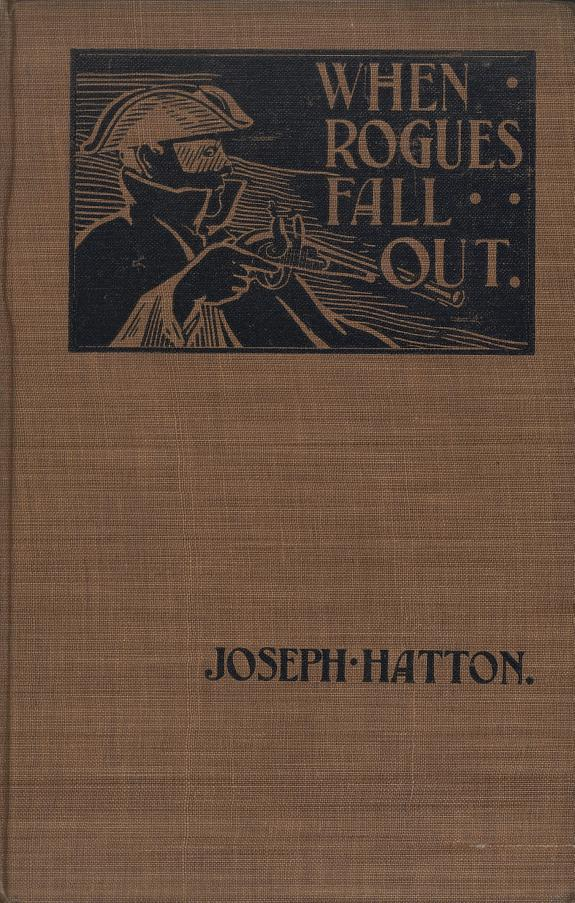
- Author: Joseph Hatton
- Language: English
- Genre: Historical fiction
- Publisher: C. Arthur Pearson Limited
- Publication date: 1899
- Publication place: United States
- Pages: 319

When Rogues Fall Out (subtitled A Romance of Old London) is an 1899 historical fiction novel by Joseph Hatton. It centers on a feud between two notorious criminals of 18th-century London, Jack Sheppard and Jonathan Wild. It also features Elizabeth Lyon, Sheppard's partner.

The book is dedicated to Weedon Grossmith. It is a novelization of Hatton's 1896 play, which Grossmith commissioned. In the preface, Hatton credits William Harrison Ainsworth's 1839 novel Jack Sheppard as his primary inspiration.

The novel's narrative is interspersed with extensive historical footnotes, drawing from contemporary sources, such as The Newgate Calendar or A Book of Scoundrels by Charles Whibley, and from historical sources like Select Trials (1724), Secrets of Newgate (1738), and Old Bailey Trials (1742).

== Reception ==
The book was received favorably by press of the time, primarily for its entertaining story, but also for its thorough research, and balanced characterizations of Sheppard and Wild. The Indianapolis News called it "a most interesting and thrilling story", noting that its version of Sheppard was less sensationalist than Ainsworth's 1839 novel. The Springfield Republican praised the novel also, for its depiction of Jonathan Wild taking "a view midway between those of [Wild's] eulogists and his detractors."
