= Edward Bennett (actor) =

English actor (born 1979)

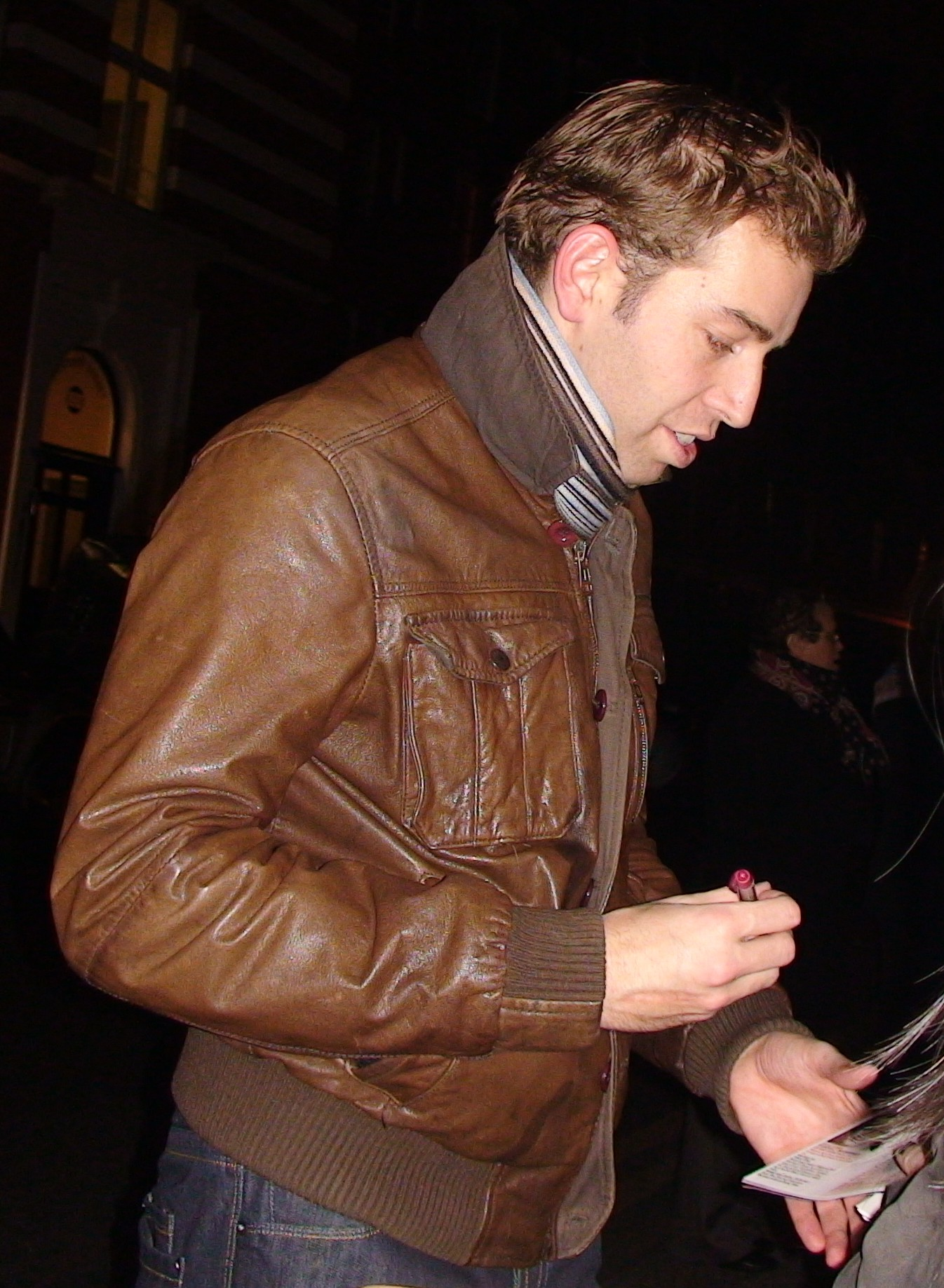
- Bennett at the Novello Theatre stage door in 2008
- Born: 9 April 1979 (age 46); Honeybourne, Worcestershire, England
- Occupation: Actor
- Years active: 2003–present

Edward Mark W Bennett (born 9 April 1979) is an English actor.

== Early life ==
Bennett was born in Honeybourne, Worcestershire. He attended Chipping Campden School in Gloucestershire, and graduated from Cardiff University with a BSc in history and politics. He attended the Royal Academy of Dramatic Art (RADA).

== Career ==
In 2008, Bennett appeared as Laertes in Hamlet, Demetrius in A Midsummer Night's Dream, and Berowne in Love's Labour's Lost. He reprised the first two roles when the productions toured London's Novello Theatre from December 2008 to February 2009, understudying for Hamlet and performing the role from 8 December 2008 until 2 January 2009 whilst David Tennant was undergoing surgery for a spinal injury.

In 2014, Bennett was appointed the Patron of Chapel Lane Theatre Company based in Stratford-Upon-Avon, UK.

== Awards ==
- Ian Charleson Awards 2007 – Special Commendation for Dick Gurvil in Nan, Victor Bretherton in Diana of Dobson's (Orange Tree), Freddy Eynsford-Hill in Pygmalion (Peter Hall Co), and Roderigo in Othello (Donmar Warehouse)
- Ian Charleson Awards 2008 – Won second place for roles in Hamlet and Love's Labours Lost (RSC)

== Stage ==
Year	Title	Role	Venue
2003	Hay Fever	Simon	Theatr Clwyd, Mold
2004	Charley's Aunt	Lord Babberley	Northcott Theatre, Exeter
2004	Alice's Adventures in Wonderland	The Caterpillar	Bristol Old Vic, Bristol
2005	The Invention of Love	Pollard	Salisbury Playhouse, Salisbury
2005	The Importance of Being Earnest	Algemon	York Theatre Royal, York
2005	Faustus	Mephistophilis	Etcetera Theatre, Camden Town
2006	School for Scandal	Snake/Careless	Salisbury Playhouse, Salisbury
2006	Measure for Measure	Elbow	Theatre Royal, Bath
2006	Habeas Corpus	Canon Throbbing	Theatre Royal, Bath
2007	Diana of Dobson's	The Hon. Captain Victor Bretherton	Orange Tree Theatre, Richmond
2007	Skin Game	Charles Hornblower	Orange Tree Theatre, Richmond
2007	Nan	Dick Gurvil	Orange Tree Theatre, Richmond
2007	Pygmalion	Freddy Eynsford-Hill	Theatre Royal, Bath
2007	Little Nell	George Wharton-Robinson	Theatre Royal, Bath
2007	Othello	Rodrigo	Donmar Warehouse, Covent Garden
2008	Hamlet	Laertes	Royal Shakespeare Company, Stratford-upon-Avon
2008	Love's Labour's Lost	Navah	Royal Shakespeare Company, Stratford-upon-Avon
2009	A Midsummer Night's Dream	Demitrius	Royal Shakespeare Company, Stratford-upon-Avon
2009	Hay Fever	Sandy	Chichester Festival Theatre, Chichester
2009	As You Like It and The Tempest	Oliver/Ferdinand	The Bridge Project, Brooklyn Academy of Music/The Old Vic, New York City/London
2011	Plenty	Raymond Brock	Crucible Theatre, Sheffield
2011	Three Farces	Intruder	Orange Tree Theatre, Richmond
2011	Then the Snow Came	Various	Orange Tree Theatre, Richmond
2011	Love Song	Billie Alton	Frantic Assembly, Warwick Arts Centre, Coventry
2012	In the Next Room (or The Vibrator Play)	Leo Irving	Theatre Royal, Bath
2012	School for Scandal	Joseph Surface	Theatre Royal, Bath
2013	One Man, Two Guvnors	Stanley Stubbers	Royal National Theatre, South Bank
2013	In the Next Room (or The Vibrator Play)	Leo Irving	St. James Theatre, London
2014	Things We Do for Love	Hamish	Theatre Royal, Bath
2014	Love's Labour's Lost/Love's Labour's Won	Berowne/Benedict	Royal Shakespeare Company, Stratford-upon-Avon
2015	The Rehearsal	Hero	Minerva Theatre, Chichester Festival Theatre, Chichester
2015	Orson's Shadow	Kenneth Tynan	Southwark Playhouse, London
2015	Photograph 51	Francis Clark	Noël Coward Theatre, London
2016	Watership Down	Woundwort & Holly	Watermill Theatre, Bagnor
2018	Macbeth	Macduff	Royal Shakespeare Company, Stratford-upon-Avon
2019	Breaking the Code	Alan Turing	Salisbury Playhouse, Salisbury
2020	Betrayal	Jerry	Theatre Royal, Bath

== Filmography ==
=== Film ===
Year	Title	Role	Notes
2009	Hamlet	Laertes	Television film
2011	War Horse	Cavalry recruiting officer	
2012	Love Song	Billy	
2023	Napoleon	Jean de Cambaceres	

=== Television ===
Year	Title	Role	Notes
2007	Silent Witness	Gregory Kris	Episode: "Suffer the Children"
2007	After You've Gone	Waiter	Episode: "Silence of the Clams"
2009	Doctors	Ralph Western	Episode: "Carpe Diem"
2010	Above Suspicion	Edward Wickenham	Episode: "The Red Dahlia"
2010	The Persuasionists	Michael	
2012	Miranda	New Boss	Episode: "It Was Panning"
2017	Victoria	C. E. Trevelyan	Episode: "Faith, Hope and Charity"
2018	Poldark	Prime Minister Pitt	3 episodes
2019	Pennyworth	Rupert	Episode: "Pilot"
2020	Cobra	Peter Mott	Series regular
2020	Save Me	Max Owen	1 episode
2020	Industry	Goldman Sachs MD	Episode: "Pre-Crisis Activity"
2024	Bridgerton	Walter Dundas	2 Episodes
2025	SAS: Rogue Heroes	Miles Dempsey	2 episodes
