= Octavia Wilberforce =

English physician

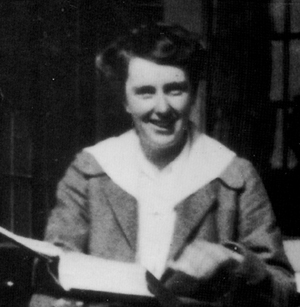
- Born: Octavia Margaret Wilberforce; 8 January 1888; Sussex, England
- Died: 19 December 1963 (aged 75)
- Education: London School of Medicine for Women
- Occupation: Doctor
- Parent(s): Reginald Garton Wilberforce, Anna Maria Denman
- Relatives: Samuel Wilberforce, William Wilberforce, Thomas Denman, 1st Baron Denman

Octavia Wilberforce (1888–1963) was an English physician who made a medical career despite opposition from her parents, with support from Elizabeth Robins. She was in general practice in Brighton, and ran a women's shelter near Henfield. She treated Virginia Woolf's mental illness in the final years of Woolf's life. She was also friends with multiple members of the Bloomsbury Group.

== Life ==
Octavia Margaret Wilberforce was the daughter and eighth child of Reginald Garton Wilberforce (1838–1914), son of Samuel Wilberforce, and his wife, Anna Maria Denman (died 1938), daughter of Richard Denman; her great-grandfather was Thomas Denman, 1st Baron Denman. She was born at Lavington House, Petworth, Sussex, and had little format education. She came out as a débutante in 1907.

Wilberforce met Elizabeth Robins in 1909. In 1910 she took one of the family's maids to hospital, and met Louisa Martindale, an influential contact. Her parents planned for her to marry Charles Buxton, son of Sydney Buxton, 1st Earl Buxton, but the match was against her wishes and she refused him. Instead, she entered the London School of Medicine for Women in 1913, beginning seven years of study and qualifying in 1920.

With her father refusing her financial support and disinheriting her, Wilberforce relied mainly on Robins and Lord Buxton. Upon qualifying, she worked as house physician to Wilfred Harris at St Mary's Hospital, London.

From 1923 Wilberforce was in general practice in Brighton, retiring in 1954. Robins met Leonard and Virginia Woolf in 1928, at the award ceremony for the Femina - Vie Heureuse Prize; she had known Leslie Stephen, Virginia's father. The Woolfs came to know Wilberforce, who lived with Robins in Brighton, on a social basis at this point.

A social call for tea by Wilberforce to the Woolfs at Monk's House, Rodmell on 9 December 1940 became a consultation when Leonard Woolf involved Wilberforce in her professional capacity. Wilberforce subsequently advised Virginia on the lines of her treatment of exhausted women at Backsettown, a farmhouse belonging to Robins. On 27 March 1941 Leonard drove Virginia to consult Wilberforce in Brighton; she advised complete rest on the basis of a physical examination. Virginia Woolf died by suicide the following day.

Octavia Wilberforce died on 19 December 1963.
