= William – an Englishman =

1919 novel by Cicely Hamilton

William – an Englishman is a 1919 novel by Cicely Hamilton. The novel explores the effect of the First World War on a married couple during the rise of Socialism and the Suffragette movement. It was originally published by Skeffington & Son before being reprinted by Persephone Books in 1999. Described as 'a passionate assertion of the futility of war' by The Spectator, William - an Englishman won the first Prix Femina-Vie Heureuse Anglais prize in 1920.

Though it has been perceived as anti-war, Hamilton's novel is actually an ardent and patriotic defense of the British war effort, with its most devastating critiques being against the home pacifist movement. Ridiculing English pacifists as being “self-centered,” Hamilton accuses them of walking “the pathways of the paradise of fools,” and of being unwilling and unable to recognize the necessity of war when it came. William Tully, the hapless protagonist of the story, goes through three distinct phases in his attitude toward war: 1) naïve pacifism before the War; 2) martial patriotism after the Germans kill his new bride; 3) weary disillusion with his unappreciated role in the war effort. Though Tully does end up embittered against war in general, Hamilton never swerves from her dominant thesis that this disillusionment does not contradict the absolute rightness of the Allied war effort, a rightness justified by the implacable, inhuman menace of the German Empire. Just when the reader expects the story to turn against war in general, Hamilton assures us that Tully has not “drifted” back toward his “former” pacifism: “He hated the war as it affected himself, was weary of the war in general; all he longed for was its ending, which meant his release from imprisonment; but neither hatred nor weariness had blinded his eyes to the folly of that other blindness which had denied that war could be.”
