= Frank Hatton (explorer) =

British explorer (1861–1883)

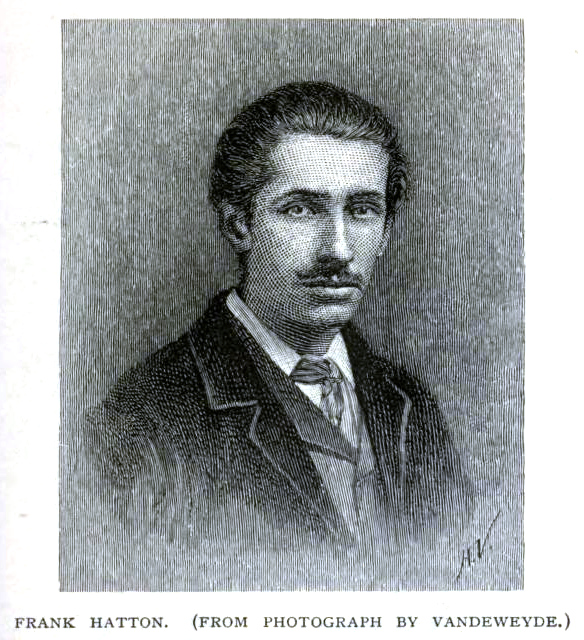
Frank Hatton, engraving based on a photo by Vandeweyde (1885)

Frank Hatton (31 August 1861 – 1 March 1883) was an English geologist and explorer, who died young from an accidental shooting in the Bornean jungle. He was the second child of the journalist Joseph Hatton, who wrote a biographical preface to the book on North Borneo published posthumously based on field notes.

== Biography ==
Frank was born at Horfield near Bristol and was educated at Marcy, near Lille in France and later King's College School. He went to study at the Royal School of Mines in London where he won the Frankland prize of the Institute of Chemistry. With a keen interest in the study of geology, he joined the British North Borneo Company as a mineral explorer and set off on his first expedition, leaving London in August 1881. He reached Labuan in October and Abai in November. He explored the Sequati and Kurina rivers before recouping at Singapore and in the summer of 1882 he visited the Labuk river followed by Kinoram district. Frank had been extremely interested in exploration, with a knowledge of local dialects and well read on the works of earlier explorers. News of his death came from the servants who accompanied Hatton into the forest. The story was told to Andrew Beveridge, an Australian gold miner who was present at the time. His last words were uttered in Malay to an assistant named Odeen. Odeen would later serve as a servant to Herbert Ward. Both Beveridge and the coroner, Dr J. H. Walker had some doubts about the accounts and the available evidence. The official explanation was that he was killed when his Winchester rifle, entangled in the forest vegetation, went off while he was pursuing an elephant. After his death, his body was brought by several days of canoe journey on the Kinabatangan River to Elopura. An enquiry pointed to accidental death and he was buried at Sandakan cemetery.

After his death, his father and friends established a Frank Hatton prize for the best student in organic chemistry, awarded each year by the Royal School of Mines and Normal College of Science, Kensington (now part of Imperial College) where Frank had carried out his undergraduate studies. Joseph Conrad was inspired by the stories of Hatton's travels and incorporated some ideas from them.

Frank's publications included a note on The Adventures of a Drop of Thames Water to the Whitehall Review and two papers- On the Action of Bacteria on Various Gases, and On the Influence of Intermittent Filtration through Sand and Spongy Iron on Animal and Vegetable Matters dissolved in Water, and the Reduction of Nitrates by savage and other agents.

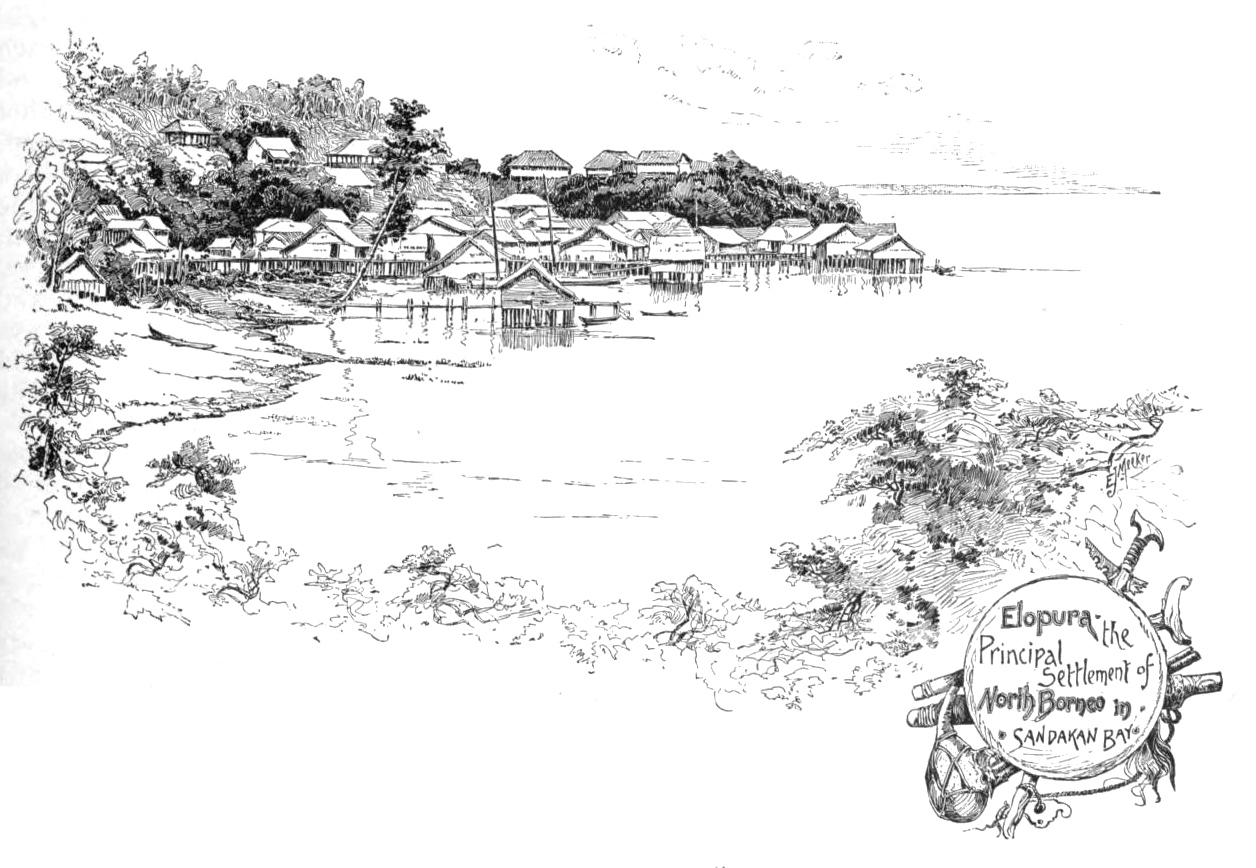
Elopura where Frank Hatton's body was brought

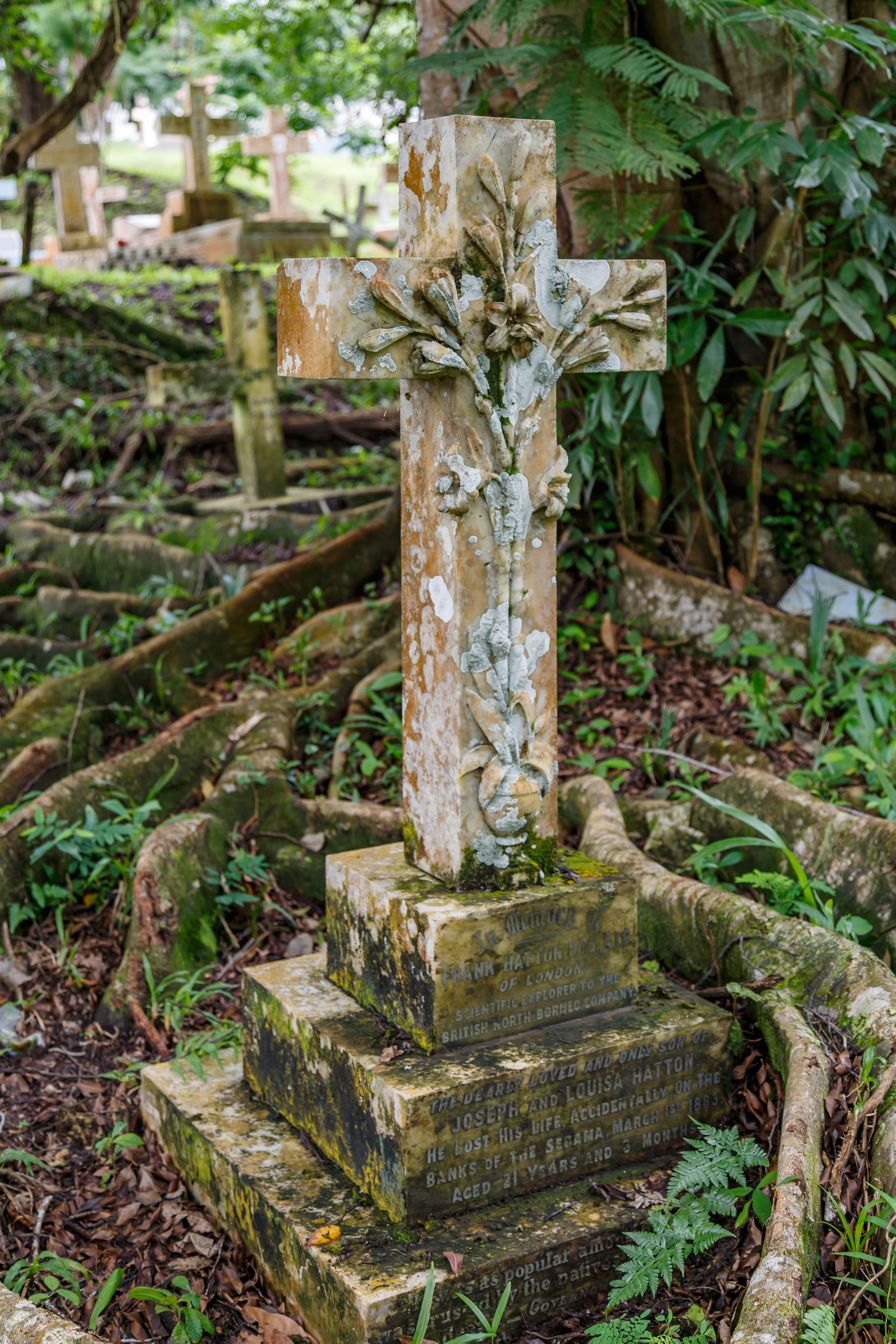
Hatton's tombstone at the Christian Cemetery Sandakan
