= Diana of Dobson's =

1908 feminist novel and play by Cicely Hamilton

Diana of Dobson's is a 1908 feminist novel and play by Cicely Hamilton. The play is subtitled A Romantic Comedy in Four Acts. Ostensibly a romantic comedy, it has been added to the canon of feminist theatre because it critiques many contemporary social issues including sweated labour, homelessness, sexual double standards and the nature of marriage.

== Plot summary (play) ==
Diana is an underpaid worker in an Edwardian department store ('Dobson's') in Clapham. Act One takes place in the workers' dingy dormitory, the shopgirls prepare for bed whilst discussing their harsh working conditions. Diana discovers that she has unexpectedly inherited £300 from a distant relative, which she decides to spend on the holiday of a lifetime.

Acts Two and Three take place at a mountain resort in Switzerland. Pretending to be a wealthy widow, Diana finds herself pursued by two other holidaymakers: Sir Jabez Grinley, the wealthy owner of a chain of shops; and Victor Bretherton, an impecunious ex-guardsman (although possessing a very comfortable private income of £600 per year) accompanied by his predatory aunt. She turns down a proposal of marriage from Sir Jabez. When Victor proposes, she reveals the truth about her financial circumstances in order to give him a chance to reconsider his proposal. Victor accuses her of being a disreputable 'adventuress', whereupon she indignantly retorts that, in seeking to marry a rich woman instead of actually working to support himself, he is in fact the disreputable one. The two part ways.

Act Four opens on a November morning on the Thames Embankment. Victor is sleeping rough on a bench. He recognises a police constable as an old acquaintance, and reveals why he is living in such dire circumstances: stung by Diana's criticism, he has been trying for months to make a living by manual labour. In a lucky coincidence, Diana also arrives on the scene. She is now homeless and 'half-starved', having lost her job due to illness. The couple recognise each other and talk. Victor proposes again, and Diana eventually accepts. Sitting together on the bench, they celebrate their engagement with a breakfast of coffee and bread-and-butter, purchased with a shilling lent to them by the constable.

== Production history ==
The play opened at the Kingsway Theatre in London, on Wednesday 12 February 1908, with Lena Ashwell in the title role. It proved to be a popular and commercial success, and ran for 143 performances at the Kingsway. In 1908 and 1909 four other companies toured Britain with the play, and productions were scheduled in the United States, Australia and South Africa.

Diana of Dobson's was revived by Mint Theater Company in 2001 in New York City. The Orange Tree Theatre revieved it in Richmond in 2007, with a cast including Edward Bennett.

== Other adaptations ==
Hamilton's story was adapted into a 1917 silent film starring Cecilia Loftus. This version included a storyline where the heroine was falsely accused of theft.
