= Elizabeth Robins =

American actor and feminist (1862–1952)

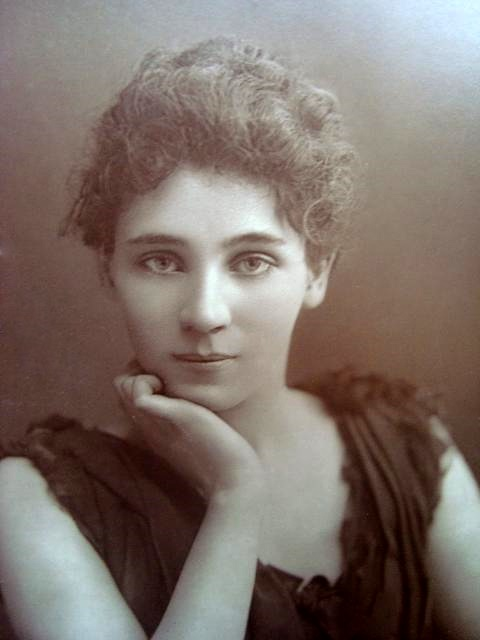
- Born: August 6, 1862; Louisville, Kentucky, US
- Died: May 8, 1952 (aged 89); Brighton, England
- Other name: C. E. Raimond
- Spouse: George Richmond Parks (1885–1887)
- Relatives: Raymond Robins (brother)

Elizabeth Robins (August 6, 1862 – May 8, 1952) was an actress, playwright, novelist, and suffragette. She also wrote as C. E. Raimond.

== Early life ==
Elizabeth Robins, the first child of Charles Robins and Hannah Crow, was born in Louisville, Kentucky. After financial difficulties, her father left for Colorado, leaving the children in the care of their mother. When Hannah Crow was committed to an insane asylum, Elizabeth and the other children were sent to live with her grandmother in Zanesville, Ohio, where she was educated. It would be her grandmother who armed her with The Complete Works of William Shakespeare and her unconditional support on her endeavor to act in New York City. Her father was a follower of Robert Owen and held progressive political views. Though her father was an insurance broker, he traveled a lot during her childhood and in the summer of 1880, Robins accompanied him to mining camps and was able to attend theatre in New York and Washington along the way. Because of her intelligence, Elizabeth was one of her father's favorite children. He wanted her to attend Vassar College and study medicine. At the age of fourteen, Robins saw her first professional play (Hamlet) which ignited her desire to pursue an acting career. From 1880 to 1888, she would have an acting career in America.

== Acting career ==
After arriving in New York, Robins soon met James O'Neill, who helped her join Edwin Booth's theatre and by 1882, she was touring. She soon grew bored and irritated playing "wretched, small character parts" and in 1883 joined the Boston Museum stock company. It would be here that she met her future husband, George Parks, who was also a member of the company. In 1885 Robins married Parks. Although her husband struggled to get acting parts, she was soon in great demand and would be on tour throughout their marriage. Her refusal to leave the stage may have contributed to Parks to commit suicide in 1887 by jumping off a bridge into the Charles River, stating in his suicide note, "I will not stand in your light any longer." On September 3, 1888, Robins moved to London. "Her move to London represented a rebirth after personal tragedy in America." Except for extended visits to the U.S. to visit family, she remained in England for the rest of her life.

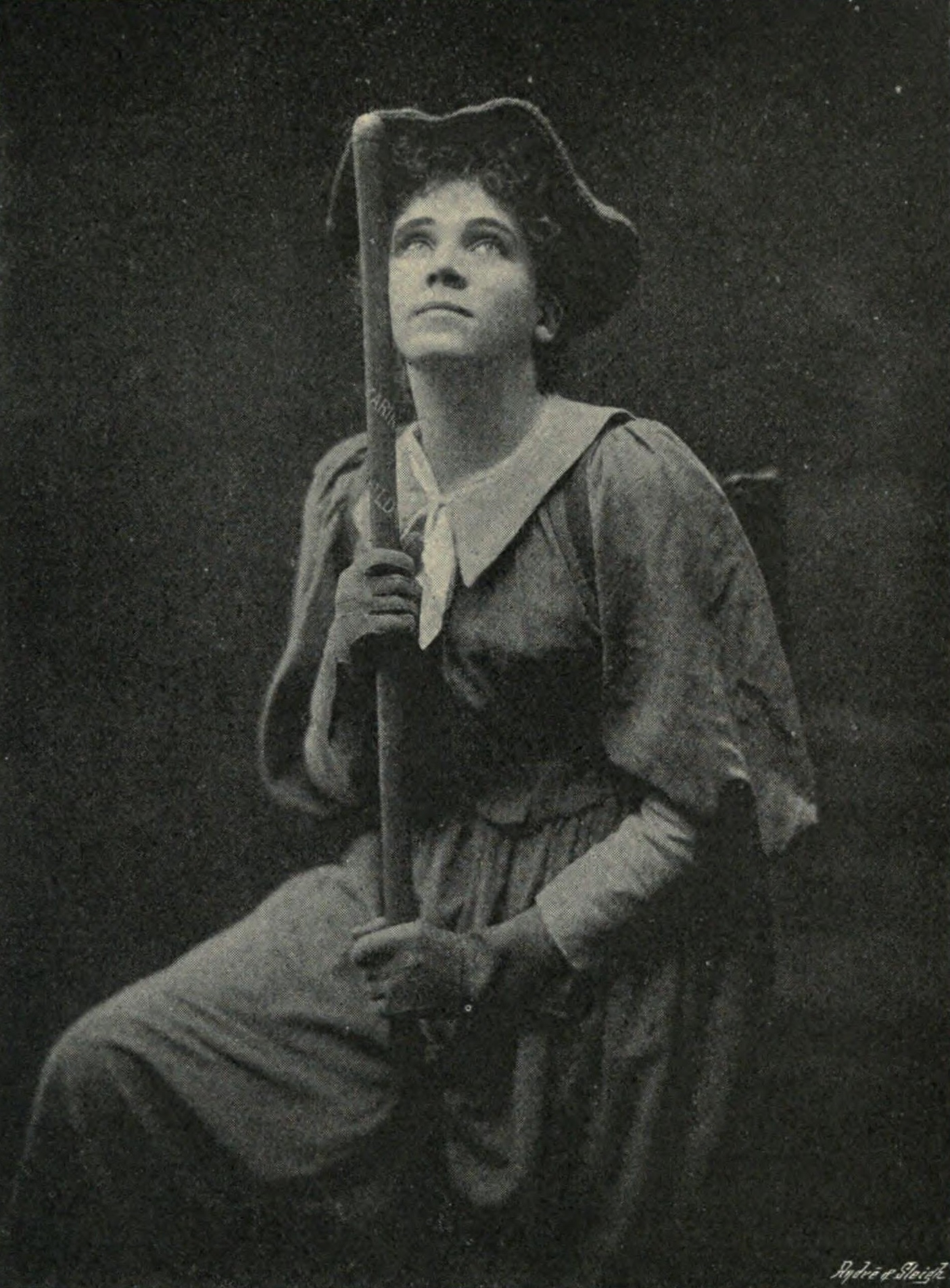
Robins photographed by H. S. Mendelssohn

At a social gathering during her first week in England, Robins met Oscar Wilde. Throughout her career, he would come see her act and give her critiques, such as in one of her roles in Frances Hodgson Burnett's The Real Little Lord Fauntleroy in 1889. Wilde's comment was "you have definitely asserted your position as an actress of the first order. Your future on our stage is assured."

Early in her time in London, Robins became enamored with the plays of Henrik Ibsen. In 1891 a London matinee revival of A Doll's House put Robins in contact with Marion Lea. Together they would form a joint management, making this the "first step toward the theatre that Robins had dreamed of … a theatre of independent management and artistic standards." Finding work in "'women's plays' written by men like Ibsen," Robins and Lea brought strong female characters to the stage. George Bernard Shaw noted "what is called the Woman Question has begun to agitate the stage." Together Elizabeth Robins and Marion Lea brought Ibsen's Hedda Gabler to the stage for the first time ever in England. A Doll's House "marked an important step in the representation of women by dramatists" and Hedda marked an important step for Elizabeth Robins, becoming her defining role. "Sarah Bernhardt could not have done it better," wrote William Archer in a publication of The World. From then on, Hedda became synonymous with Robins on the English stage. Robins and Lea would go on to produce a handful of Ibsen's other 'New Woman' plays. "The experience of acting and producing Ibsen's plays and the reactions to her work helped transform Elizabeth over time into a committed supporter of women's rights." In 1898, she joined forces with William Archer, an influential critic, and together they produced non-profit Ibsen plays. She became known in Britain as "Ibsen's High Priestess."

In 1902, Robins played Lucrezia in Stephen Phillips's Paolo and Francesca at the St. James's Theatre, London. Ending her acting career at the age of forty, Robins had made her mark on the English stage as not only an actress but an actress-manager.

== Writing career ==
Robins realised her income from acting was not stable enough to support her fully. While Robins was busy being a successful actress, she had to leave England to look for her brother in Alaska, who had gone missing. Her experiences searching for her brother led her to write her novels, Magnetic North (written in 1904) and Come and Find Me (1908). Before this, she had written novels such as George Mandeville's Husband (1894), The New Moon (1895), Below the Salt and Other Stories (1896) and several others under the name of C. E. Raimond. She explained her use of a pseudonym as a means of keeping her acting and writing careers separate but gave it up when the media reported that Robins and Raimond were the same. She and Florence Bell anonymously wrote the play Alan's Wife based on the short story "Befried" by the Swedish author Elin Améen. She enjoyed a long career as a fiction and nonfiction writer.

In her biography of Elizabeth Robins, Staging a Life, Angela V. John says, "It is possible to trace in Elizabeth's writing from 1890s onwards an emerging feminist critique, clearly, but only partly, influenced by the psychological realism of Ibsen, which would find most confident expression in 1907 in her justly celebrated novel "The Convert". Robins's main character, Vida, speaks to "male politicians and social acquaintances", something very different from what the women of Robins's time did – something very reminiscent of one of Ibsen's 'new women.' The novel is an adaptation of Robins's most successful play, Votes for Women! The first play to bring the "street politics of women's suffrage to the stage", Votes for Women! led to a surge of suffrage theatre. Elizabeth Robins first attended "open-air meetings of the suffrage union" when the Women's Social and Political Union moved its headquarters from Manchester to London in 1906. It was then that she "abandoned" the current play she was writing and worked to complete the very first suffrage drama. "The more Robins became immersed in the work, the more she became converted to the cause".

== Women's rights involvement ==
Robins became a member of the National Union of Women's Suffrage Societies, as well as the Women's Social and Political Union, although she broke with the WSPU over its increasing use of violent militancy. She remained a strong advocate of women's rights, however, and used her skills as a public speaker and writer on behalf of the cause. In 1907 her book The Convert was published. It was later turned into a play that became synonymous with the suffrage movement. When the 1911 census was taken, Robins evaded enumeration and instead wrote on her form: "the occupier of this house will be ready to give the desired information the moment the Government recognises women as responsible citizens".

Robins remained an active feminist throughout her life. In the 1920s she was a regular contributor to the feminist magazine, Time and Tide. She also continued to write books such as Ancilla's Share: An Indictment of Sex Antagonism, which explored the issues of sexual inequality. She collected and edited speeches, lectures, and articles dealing with the women's movement, some of which had never previously appeared in print (Way Stations, published by Dodd, Mead and Company, New York, 1913).

Frederick Pethick-Lawrence, 1st Baron Pethick-Lawrence credited Robins with explaining to him the difference between a suffragette and a suffragist.

Robins was involved in the campaign to allow women to enter the House of Lords. Her friend, Margaret Haig, was the daughter of D. A. Thomas, Viscount Rhondda. He was a supporter of women's rights and on being created viscount insisted on a special remainder for Margaret to inherit his title. This was considered radical, as women did not normally inherit peerage titles. When Rhondda died in 1918 the House of Lords refused to allow Margaret, now the Viscountess Rhondda, to take her seat. Robins wrote numerous articles on the subject, but the House of Lords refused to change its decision. It was not until 1958 that women were first admitted to the House.

== Personal life ==
A beautiful woman, Robins was pursued by many men. She admitted to a deep attraction to her close friend, the highly respected literary critic and fellow Ibsen scholar, William Archer. As a married man Archer was unavailable, however. Except for her brief marriage to George Parks, she remained a single woman. Highly intelligent, she was welcomed into London's literary and artistic circles, enjoying friendships with George Bernard Shaw, Oscar Wilde, and Henry James, as well as a tempestuous romantic (but probably non-physical) relationship with the much younger future poet laureate John Masefield.

In 1900 Robins traveled alone to the gold rush camps of Alaska in search of her favorite brother Raymond Robins, whom she feared was lost in the Yukon. After a long and arduous journey, she located Raymond in Nome. She shared his life in wild and lawless Alaska throughout the summer of 1900. Her adventures were not without cost – the typhoid fever she contracted at that time compromised her health for the rest of her life. Robins's tales about Alaska provided material for a number of articles she sent on to London for publication. Her best selling book, The Magnetic North, is an account of her experiences, as is The Alaska-Klondike Diary of Elizabeth Robins.

Although Robins rejected her father's plans for her to be educated as a doctor, she retained a strong interest in medicine. In 1909 she met Octavia Wilberforce, the great-granddaughter of William Wilberforce, a leader of the British abolitionist movement. Octavia was a young woman whose desire to study medicine was thwarted by a family which viewed intellectualism and professional careers as "unsexing" for women. When Wilberforce's father refused to pay for her studies and disinherited her for pursuing them, Robins and other friends provided financial and moral support until she became a doctor. While some have conjectured that Robins and Wilberforce were romantically involved, this has never been supported by scholarly material available about either woman, nor is it borne out by their own writings. Available evidence points to Robins and Wilberforce enjoying a relationship much like that of mother and daughter. In her declining years Robins developed a friendship with Virginia and Leonard Woolf. Dr. Wilberforce looked after Robins until her death at her home in Brighton on May 8, 1952, just months shy of her 90th birthday.

== Works ==
Anonymously, with Florence Bell, she wrote:

- Alan's Wife, 1893

As C. E. Raimond, she wrote:

- George Mandeville's Husband, 1894
- The New Moon, 1895
- Below the Salt, 1896
- The Open Question: A Tale of Two Temperaments, 1898

The success of this last novel led to her publishing under her own name:

- The Alaska-Klondike Diary of Elizabeth Robins, 1900
- The Magnetic North, 1904
- A Dark Lantern, 1905 (filmed in 1920)
- The Convert, 1907
- Under The Southern Cross, 1907
- Votes for Women! (A suffrage play produced at the Royal Court Theatre, Sloane Square, London), 1907
- Come and Find Me, 1908, a sequel to The Magnetic North
- My Little Sister, 1913 (filmed in 1919)
- Camilla, 1918
- The Messenger, 1920
- Ancilla's Share: An Indictment of Sex Antagonism, 1924
- The Florentine Frame, 1909
- Way Stations, 1913
- Raymond and I, 1956

== See also ==
- History of feminism
- List of suffragists and suffragettes
- Women's suffrage in the United Kingdom
