= Militia Act =

There have been many statutes known as Militia Act, or, when proposed and before passage into law, the Militia Bill.

- Militia Ordinance, or Militia Bill, proposed in 1642 in England
- The King's Sole Right over the Militia Act 1661 (13 Cha. 2 St. 1. c. 6), England
- Militia Act 1662 (14 Cha. 2. c. 3), England, defining lord-lieutenants' powers to raise militia
- Militia Act 1745 (19 Geo. 2. c. 2), Kingdom of Great Britain
- Militia Act 1757 (30 Geo. 2. c. 25), creating a militia to defend Britain during the Seven Years' War, leading to the creation of The Poker Club in Scotland
- Militia Act 1786 (26 Geo. 3. c. 107), an act of the Parliament of Great Britain
- Militia Acts of 1792 (Uniform Militia Act), two acts passed by the United States Federal government
- Militia Act (Ireland) 1793 (33 Geo. 3. c. 22 (I))
- Militia Act 1797, to create a uniform Scottish militia
- Militia Act of 1808, United States
- Militia Act of 1855, Canada
- Militia Act of 1862, United States
- Militia Act of 1903 (Dick Act), United States
- Militia Act 1802 (42 Geo. 3. c. 90), United Kingdom
- Militia Act 1803 (43 Geo. 3. c. 50), act of the Parliament of the United Kingdom
- Militia Act of 1845, to create the Nelson Battalion of Militia in New Zealand
- Militia Act 1882 (45 & 46 Vict. c. 49), United Kingdom, amended by the Reserve Forces and Militia Act 1898

== See also ==
- Scottish Militia Bill (1708)
