= Territorial Army and Militia Act 1921 =

Act of the Parliament of the United Kingdom

Territorial Army and Militia Act 1921 (Note: Section 5(1).)
- Act of Parliament
- Parliament of the United Kingdom
- Long title: An Act to provide for the application of new designations to the territorial force and the special reserve, and to repeal enactments relating to the militia and yeomanry; and for purposes in connection therewith.
- Citation: 11 & 12 Geo. 5. c. 37
- Territorial extent: United Kingdom

Dates
- Royal assent: 17 August 1921
- Commencement: 1 October 1921 (Note: Section 5(2).)
- Repealed: 20 May 1980
Other legislation
Amends	Militia (Stannaries) Act 1802; Militia Act 1802; Militia (Scotland) Act 1802; Militia (Ireland) Act 1809; Militia Law Amendment Act 1854; Regulation of the Forces Act 1871; Reserve Forces Act 1882; Militia Act 1882; Reserve Forces and Militia Act 1898; Reserve Forces Act 1900; Territorial and Reserve Forces Act 1907
Repeals/revokes	Better Ordering the Forces Act 1663; Militia (Tower Hamlets) Act 1796; Yeomanry (Ireland) Act 1802; Militia Stannaries Act 1802; Militia (Exemption of Religious Teachers) Act 1802; Militia Act 1803; Militia (Scotland) (No. 2) Act 1803; Yeomanry Act 1804; Yeomanry Accounts Act 1804; Local Militia (England) Act 1812; Local Militia (Scotland) Act 1812; Militia Returns Act 1812; Local Militia (Exemption) Act 1812; Local Militia (England) Act 1813; Local Militia (Scotland) Act 1813; Militia (Medical Examination) Act 1815; Yeomanry (Training) Act 1816; Yeomanry Act 1817; Yeomanry Act 1826; Militia Act 1852; Militia Law (Amendment) Act 1854; Militia (Scotland) Act 1854; Militia (Ireland) Act 1854; Militia Act 1855; Militia (Ireland) Act 1857; Militia (Storehouses) Act 1860; Militia (Ballot) Act 1860; Militia (Ballot Suspension) Act 1865; Militia (Ireland) Act 1869; Militia and Yeomanry Act 1901; Militia and Yeomanry Act 1902
Amended by	Statute Law Revision Act 1950; Auxiliary Forces Act 1953
Repealed by	Reserve Forces Act 1980
Relates to	Territorial and Reserve Forces Act 1907

Status: Repealed

History of passage through Parliament

Text of statute as originally enacted

The Territorial Army and Militia Act 1921 (11 & 12 Geo. 5. c. 37) was an act of the Parliament of the United Kingdom affecting the reserves of the British Army It modified the Territorial and Reserve Forces Act 1907 (7 Edw. 7. c. 9), renaming the existing Territorial Force as the "Territorial Army" and the Special Reserve as the "Militia", and updated or repealed a number of outdated regulations.

The act primarily served to rename the two organisations, which had been announced as a government policy the previous year, and ensure that all regulations and legislation referring to the two were updated. The renaming provoked some controversy and confusion, particularly as the original use of "Militia" had only been abolished fourteen years earlier, but it was argued that the role of a "Militia" was clearer and more readily understood by the public than that of a "Special Reserve".

The act also served to abolish the "legislative lumber", as it was termed by Viscount Peel, the previous Under-Secretary of State for War, of the old Militia and Yeomanry Acts which were still nominally in force. The eighteenth and nineteenth-century system of a locally conscripted Militia and volunteer Yeomanry had been effectively abolished by the Territorial and Reserve Forces Act 1907 (7 Edw. 7. c. 9), and all the organised units had been dissolved or transferred to the new system, but the legislative framework still existed. The act thus abolished these powers as no longer necessary or appropriate.

== Provisions ==
=== Repealed enactments ===
Section 4 of the act repealed 68 enactments, listed in the second schedule to the act.

Citation	Short title	Description	Extent of repeal
14 Car. 2. c. 3	City of London Militia Act 1662	An Act for ordering the forces in the several counties of the Kingdom.	The whole act, except so much of section one as confers power on His Majesty to issue forth commissions of lieutenancy in respect of the City of London, and so much of section twenty-six as provides for the imposition and levying of a rate in the City of London.
15 Car. 2. c. 4	Better Ordering the Forces Act 1663	An additional Act for the better ordering the forces in the several counties of this Kingdom.	The whole act.
19 Geo. 3. c. 44	Nonconformist Relief Act 1779	The Nonconformist Relief Act, 1779.	In section one, the words "from serving in the Militia of this Kingdom, and shall also be exempted."
37 Geo. 3. c. 25	Militia (Tower Hamlets) Act 1796	The Militia (Tower Hamlets) Act, 1796.	The whole act.
42 Geo. 3. c. 68	Yeomanry (Ireland) Act 1802	The Yeomanry (Ireland) Act, 1802.	The whole act.
42 Geo. 3. c. 72	Militia (Stannaries) Act 1802	The Militia Stannaries Act, 1802.	The whole act.
42 Geo. 3. c. 90	Militia Act 1802	The Militia Act, 1802	The whole act, except so much of section eighteen as prescribes the appointment of clerks to general meetings.
42 Geo. 3. c. 91	Militia (Scotland) Act 1802	The Militia (Scotland) Act, 1802.	The whole act, except so much of section thirteen as prescribes the appointment of clerks to general meetings.
43 Geo. 3. c. 10	Militia (Exemption of Religious Teachers) Act 1802	The Militia (Exemption of Religious Teachers) Act, 1803.	The whole act.
43 Geo. 3. c. 50	Militia Act 1803	The Militia Act, 1803	The whole act.
43 Geo. 3. c. 89	Militia (Scotland) Act 1803	The Militia (Scotland) Act, 1803.	Section twenty-one.
43 Geo. 3. c. 100	Militia (Scotland) (No. 2) Act 1803	The Militia (Scotland) (No. 2) Act, 1803.	The whole act.
44 Geo. 3. c. 54	Yeomanry Act 1804	The Yeomanry Act, 1804	The whole act.
44 Geo. 3. c. 94	Yeomanry (Accounts) Act 1804	The Yeomanry Accounts Act, 1804.	The whole act.
49 Geo. 3. c. 120	Militia (Ireland) Act 1809	The Militia (Ireland) Act, 1809	The whole act, except so much of section seventy-four as prescribes the appointment of clerks to general meetings.
52 Geo. 3. c. 38	Local Militia (England) Act 1812	The Local Militia (England) Act, 1812.	The whole act.
52 Geo. 3. c. 68	Local Militia (Scotland) Act 1812	The Local Militia (Scotland) Act, 1812.	The whole act.
52 Geo. 3. c. 105	Militia Returns Act 1812	The Militia Returns Act, 1812.	The whole act.
52 Geo. 3. c. 116	Local Militia (Exemption) Act 1812	The Local Militia (Exemption) Act, 1812.	The whole act.
52 Geo. 3. c. 155	Places of Religious Worship Act 1812	The Places of Religious Worship Act, 1812.	Section nine.
53 Geo. 3. c. 28	Local Militia (England) Act 1813	The Local Militia (England) Act, 1813.	The whole act.
53 Geo. 3. c. 29	Militia (Scotland) Act 1813	The Local Militia (Scotland) Act, 1813.	The whole act.
53 Geo. 3. c. 48	Local Militia (Ireland) Act 1813	The Local Militia (Ireland) Act, 1813.	Section two.
55 Geo. 3. c. 65	Militia (Medical Examination) Act 1815	The Militia (Medical Examination) Act, 1815.	Section eight.
56 Geo. 3. c. 39	Yeomanry (Training) Act 1816	The Yeomanry (Training) Act, 1816.	The whole act.
57 Geo. 3. c. 44	Yeomanry Act 1817	The Yeomanry Act, 1817	The whole act.
1 Geo. 4. c. 100	Militia (City of London) Act 1820	The Militia (City of London) Act, 1820.	The whole act, except sections thirty-four to forty, forty-five and forty-eight.
7 Geo. 4. c. 58	Yeomanry Act 1826	The Yeomanry Act, 1826	The whole act.
2 & 3 Vict. c. 93	County Police Act 1839	The County Police Act, 1839	In section ten, the words "or in the militia."
3 & 4 Vict. c. 84	Metropolitan Police Courts Act 1840	The Metropolitan Police Courts Act, 1840.	Section ten.
5 & 6 Vict. c. 55.	Railway Regulation Act 1842	The Railway Regulation Act, 1842.	In section twenty, the word "militia."
7 & 8 Vict. c. 85	Railway Regulation Act 1844	The Railway Regulation Act, 1844.	In section twelve, the words "militia or" in both places where those words occur.
15 & 16 Vict. c. 50	Militia Act 1852	The Militia Act, 1852	The whole act.
16 & 17 Vict. c. 73	Naval Volunteers Act 1853	The Naval Volunteers Act, 1853.	In section eight, the words "from service in the militia and".
17 & 18 Vict. c. 105	Militia Law Amendment Act 1854	The Militia Law (Amendment) Act, 1854.	The whole act.
17 & 18 Vict. c. 106	Militia (Scotland) Act 1854	The Militia (Scotland) Act, 1854.	The whole act.
17 & 18 Vict. c. 107	Militia (Ireland) Act 1854	The Militia (Ireland) Act, 1854.	The whole act.
18 & 19 Vict. c. 57	Militia Act 1855	The Militia Act, 1855	The whole act.
20 & 21 Vict. c. 11	Militia (Ireland) Act 1857	The Militia (Ireland) Act, 1857.	The whole act.
21 & 22 Vict. c. 90	Medical Act 1858	The Medical Act, 1858	In section thirty-five, the words "and from serving in the militia" and "in the militia, or".
22 & 23 Vict. c. 40	Royal Naval Reserve (Volunteer) Act 1859	The Royal Naval Reserve (Volunteer) Act, 1859.	In section seven, the words "from service in the militia and".
23 & 24 Vict. c. 94	Militia (Storehouses) Act 1860	The Militia (Storehouses) Act, 1860.	The whole act.
23 & 24 Vict. c. 120	Militia (Ballot) Act 1860	The Militia (Ballot) Act, 1860	The whole act.
25 & 26 Vict. c. 4	Officers' Commissions Act 1862	The Officers Commissions Act, 1862.	In section one, the words "Militia and".
26 & 27 Vict. c. 65	Volunteer Act 1863	The Volunteer Act, 1863	In section five, the words "and Militia" and "and shall rank with officers of the Yeomanry Force according to the rank and date of their respective commissions in the respective forces"; in section eight, the words "enrols himself as a volunteer or substitute in the Militia, or is attested to serve on the permanent staff thereof or"; section forty-one; and part (iv) of the Schedule.
28 & 29 Vict. c. 46	Militia (Ballot Suspension) Act 1865	The Militia (Ballot Suspension) Act, 1865.	The whole act.
32 & 33 Vict. c. 80	Militia (Ireland) Act 1869	The Militia (Ireland) Act, 1869.	The whole act.
33 & 34 Vict. c. 67	Reserve Forces Act 1870	The Reserve Forces Act, 1870.	Section twenty.
33 & 34 Vict. c. 77.	Juries Act 1870	The Juries Act, 1870	In the Schedule, the words "militia and yeomanry."
33 & 34 Vict. c. 96.	Appropriation Act 1870	The Appropriation Act, 1870	In section six, the words "militia, yeomanry."
34 & 35 Vict. c. 86	Regulation of the Forces Act 1871	The Regulation of the Forces Act, 1871.	In section six, the words "militia, yeomanry, and" wherever those words occur, and the words "militia, yeomanry, or"; in section nineteen, the words "the Constable of the Tower," and the words "in relation to the General or Local Militia".
38 & 39 Vict. c. 25	Public Stores Act 1875	The Public Stores Act, 1875	In section eight, the words "militia or", and in section thirteen, the word "militiaman."
39 & 40 Vict. c. 36	Customs Consolidation Act 1876	The Customs Consolidation Act, 1876.	In section nine, the words "in the militia or".
41 & 42 Vict. c. 33	Dentists Act 1878	The Dentists Act, 1878	In section thirty, the words "and from serving in the militia," and "in the militia or".
45 & 46 Vict. c. 48	Reserve Forces Act 1882	The Reserve Forces Act, 1882	Sections eight to ten; in section eleven, in subsection (1), the words "and the militia reserve respectively", the words "in the case of a man belonging to the army reserve", and the words "and in the case of a man belonging to the militia reserve fifty-six days", and subsection (3); in section twelve, the words "and the militia reserve or either of them" in subsection (1), and the words "forces or" in subsection (2); in section thirteen, the words "and militia reserve or either of them"; in section fourteen, the words "either of" in subsection (1); in section fifteen, the words "or militia" in both places where those words occur; in section sixteen, the words "or militia" in both places where those words occur; in section seventeen, the words "or militia" wherever those words occur; in section eighteen, the words "or militia," the words "or militia reserve as the case may be", and the words "and (b) in section one hundred, so far as relates to the militia reserve, of 'one whole period of annual training for three months'" in subsection (1); and the words "or by a militia officer" and the words "or militia" in subsection (2); in section nineteen, the words "or militia reserve" in both places where those words occur; in section twenty, the words "and the militia reserve or either of them" in both places where those words occur in subsection (1), and the words "or militia" in subsection (3); in section twenty-three, the words "or militia" and "and militia"; in section twenty-four, the words "or militia" wherever those words occur; in section twenty-seven, the words "or militia"; in section twenty-eight, the words "and 'militia reserve force'", the word "respectively"; and the words "and militia reserve"; in section twenty-nine, the words "or to the militia reserve force" wherever those words occur, and the words "or to the militia reserve" in subsection (3), and the words "either" and "or the militia reserve force" in subsection (4).
45 & 46 Vict. c. 49	Militia Act 1882	The Militia Act, 1882	Sections three to twenty-eight; thirty-seven to forty-seven; subsections (1) to (4) of section forty-nine; so much of subsection (5) of section forty-nine as relates to the raising of a corps of miners; section fifty-one, and the Third Schedule.
47 & 48 Vict. c. 55	Pensions and Yeomanry Pay Act 1884	The Pensions and Yeomanry Pay Act, 1884.	The whole act, so far as it applies to the yeomanry.
51 & 52 Vict. c. 31	National Defence Act 1888	The National Defence Act, 1888.	Section two.
51 & 52 Vict. c. 41	Local Government Act 1888	The Local Government Act, 1888.	In subsection (1) of section fifty-nine, the word "militia" in both places where that word occurs.
53 & 54 Vict. c. 21	Inland Revenue Regulation Act 1890	The Inland Revenue Regulation Act, 1890.	In section eight, the words "or in the militia".
55 & 56 Vict. c. 43	Military Lands Act 1892	The Military Lands Act, 1892	Section nineteen.
59 & 60 Vict. c. 25	Friendly Societies Act 1896	The Friendly Societies Act, 1896.	In subsection (1) of section forty-three, the words "in the militia or", and the words "yeomanry or".
61 & 62 Vict. c. 9	Reserve Forces and Militia Act 1898	The Reserve Forces and Militia Act, 1898.	Section two.
63 & 64 Vict. c. 42	Reserve Forces Act 1900	The Reserve Forces Act, 1900	Section two.
1 Edw. 7. c. 14.	Militia and Yeomanry Act 1901	The Militia and Yeomanry Act, 1901.	The whole act.
2 Edw. 7. c. 39	Militia and Yeomanry Act 1902	The Militia and Yeomanry Act, 1902.	The whole act.
7 Edw. 7. c. 9	Territorial and Reserve Forces Act 1907	The Territorial and Reserve Forces Act, 1907.	Section thirty-four.
8 Edw. 7. c. 48	Post Office Act 1908	The Post Office Act, 1908	In section forty-three, the words "or in the militia".

=== Short title, commencement and extent ===
Section 5(1) of the act provided that the act may be cited as the "Territorial Army and Militia Act, 1921".

Section 5(2) of the act provided that the act would come into force on 1 October 1921.

== Subsequent developments ==
Section 5(2) of, and the second schedule to the act, was repealed by section 1(1) of, and the first schedule to, the Statute Law Revision Act 1950 (14 Geo. 6. c. 6), which came into force on 23 May 1950.

The whole act was repealed by section 157(1)(b) of, and part II of schedule 10 to, the Reserve Forces Act 1980 (c. 9), which came into force on 20 April 1980.
