= Militia Act 1802 =

Act of the Parliament of the United Kingdom

Militia Act 1802 (Note: The citation of the act by this short title was authorised by section 1 of, and the first schedule to, the Short Titles Act 1896. Due to the repeal of those provisions, it is now authorised by section 19(2) of the Interpretation Act 1978.)
- Act of Parliament
- Parliament of the United Kingdom
- Long title: An Act for amending the Laws relating to the Militia in England, and for augmenting the Militia.
- Citation: 42 Geo. 3. c. 90
- Introduced by: Charles Philip Yorke MP (Commons)
- Territorial extent: United Kingdom

Dates
- Royal assent: 26 June 1802
- Commencement: 26 June 1802 (Note: The Acts of Parliament (Commencement) Act 1793.)
- Repealed: 20 April 1980
Other legislation
Amends	See § Repealed enactments
Repeals/revokes	See § Repealed enactments
Amended by	Militia (No. 2) Act 1811; Highway Act 1835; Militia Act 1852; Militia Act 1853; Militia Law Amendment Act 1854; Militia (Ballot) Act 1860; Statute Law Revision Act 1872; Statute Law Revision Act 1873; Statute Law Revision Act 1874; Militia (Voluntary Enlistment) Act 1875; Militia Act 1882; Statute Law Revision Act 1888; Territorial Army and Militia Act 1921
Repealed by	Reserve Forces Act 1980
Relates to	Militia Act 1786; Militia (Stannaries) Act 1802; Militia (Scotland) Act 1802; Militia (Ireland) Act 1802

Status: Repealed

Text of statute as originally enacted

The Militia Act 1802 (42 Geo. 3. c. 90) was an act of the Parliament of the United Kingdom affecting the Militia, a locally raised force for home defence. It applied to England and Wales, with Scotland covered by the Militia (Scotland) Act 1802 (c. 91), and Ireland by the Militia (Ireland) Act 1802 (43 Geo. 3. c. 2). Subsidiary acts dealt with the City of London, the Cinque Ports, and the Stannaries, which had special legal requirements.

== Background ==
Following the restoration of Charles II in 1660, Parliament passed several acts empowering the lord-lieutenant of each county to appoint officers and raise men for the English Militia. In 1662, the City of London Militia Act 1662 (14 Cha. 2. c. 3) was passed, which codified the power of [lord-]lieutenants of places in England and Wales to raise the militia.

Following the formation of Kingdom of Great Britain in 1707, the English Militia was transformed into the British Militia. The militia's usefulness as a military force, never great, declined thereafter, until by the middle of the 18th century it required a major overhaul. This was achieved by the Militia Acts 1757–1762, passed as a response to the threat of a French invasion during the Seven Years' War. In 1796, the Militia Act 1786 (26 Geo. 3. c. 107) was passed, which consolidated the law regulating the British Militia.

Following the formation of the United Kingdom in 1801, Parliament brought forward bills to consolidate acts relating to each of the English, Scottish and Irish militias.

== Passage ==
Leave to bring in the English Militia Bill was granted to the Secretary at War, Charles Philip Yorke MP, the Chancellor of the Exchequer, Henry Addington MP, Robert Steele MP and George FitzRoy, 4th Duke of Grafton, MP, on 13 April 1802. The bill had its first reading in the House of Commons on 13 April 1802, presented by the Secretary at War, Charles Philip Yorke MP MP. The bill had its second reading in the House of Commons on 14 April 1802 and was committed to a committee of the whole house, which met and reported on 15 April 1802, with amendments. The amended bill was re-committed to a committee of the whole house on 17 May 1802, which met on 17 May 1802 and reported on 18 May 1802, with amendments. The amended bill had its third reading in the House of Commons on 20 May 1802 and passed, with amendments.

The amended bill had its first reading in the House of Lords on 21 May 1802. The bill had its second reading in the House of Lords on 26 May 1802 and was committed to a committee of the whole house, which met on 31 May 1802 and reported on 3 June 1802, with amendments. The amended bill had its third reading in the House of Lords on 9 June 1802 and passed, without amendments.

The amended bill was considered to by the House of Commons on 14 June 1802, and was committed to a select committee, consisting of 14 members of parliament.

Name	Commentary
Charles Philip Yorke MP	Secretary at War
Henry Addington MP	Chancellor of the Exchequer
Robert Steele MP	
Sylvester Douglas, 1st Baron Glenbervie, MP	
Edward Smith-Stanley, 13th Earl of Derby, MP	
Robert Jenkinson, 2nd Earl of Liverpool, MP	
Sir William Heathcote, 3rd Baronet, MP	
John Fane, 10th Earl of Westmorland, MP	
George Howard, 6th Earl of Carlisle, MP	
Francis Gregor MP	
Sir William Lemon MP	
General Isaac Gascoyne MP	
Richard Grosvenor, 1st Earl Grosvenor, MP	
Sir William Elford MP	

The committee met on 15 June 1802 and reported on 17 June 1802, agreeing to some amendments, but disagreeing with others. The House of Commons requested a conference with the Lords, which was appointed and met for the first time on 18 June 1802.

Name	Commentary
Charles Philip Yorke MP	Secretary at War, part of the select committee
Henry Addington MP	Chancellor of the Exchequer, part of the select committee
Robert Steele MP	Part of the select committee
Sylvester Douglas, 1st Baron Glenbervie, MP	Part of the select committee
Edward Smith-Stanley, 13th Earl of Derby, MP	Part of the select committee
Robert Jenkinson, 2nd Earl of Liverpool, MP	Part of the select committee
Sir William Heathcote, 3rd Baronet, MP	Part of the select committee
John Fane, 10th Earl of Westmorland, MP	Part of the select committee
George Howard, 6th Earl of Carlisle, MP	Part of the select committee
Francis Gregor MP	Part of the select committee
Sir William Lemon MP	Part of the select committee
General Isaac Gascoyne MP	Part of the select committee
Richard Grosvenor, 1st Earl Grosvenor, MP	Part of the select committee
Sir William Elford MP	Part of the select committee
Isaac Corry MP	
John Baker Holroyd, 1st Earl of Sheffield, MP	
Sir James St Clair Erskine MP	
Sir Henry Paulet St John-Mildmay MP	
Edward Lee MP	
Sir Robert Buxton MP	
Thomas Tyrwhitt MP	
Sir Nathaniel Holland MP	
Charles Shaw Lefevre MP	
Henry Jodrell MP	
Sir George FitzGerald Hill MP	
Bernard Howard, 12th Duke of Norfolk	
George Capel-Coningsby, 5th Earl of Essex	
William Fitzwilliam, 4th Earl Fitzwilliam	
Jacob Pleydell-Bouverie, 2nd Earl of Radnor	
Henry Herbert, 2nd Earl of Carnarvon	
Alexander Wedderburn, 1st Earl of Rosslyn	
Robert Hobart, 4th Earl of Buckinghamshire	
Thomas Pelham, 2nd Earl of Chichester	
George Eden, 1st Earl of Auckland	
Henry Dundas, 1st Viscount Melville	

A further conference was appointed on 22 June 1802.

Name	Commentary
James Martin MP	
Richard Brinsley Sheridan MP	
George Johnstone MP	
George Tierney MP	
Alderman Harvey Christian Combe MP	
William Dickinson MP	
William Sturges MP	
John Nicholls MP	
Richard Bateman-Robson MP	
William Fullarton MP	
Sir Charles Henry Talbot MP	
Sir John William Anderson MP	
Sir John Honywood MP	
Benjamin Hobhouse MP	
Mr Law MP	
Edward Golding MP	
Sir William Dolben MP	
Robert Stewart, Viscount Castlereagh, MP	
Rt Hon. William Wickham MP	
William Adams MP	
General Nisbet Balsour MP	
Richard Ellison MP	
John Fordyce MP	
Whitshed Keene MP	
John Simpson MP	
George Legge, 3rd Earl of Dartmouth	
William Fitzwilliam, 4th Earl Fitzwilliam	
Alexander Wedderburn, 1st Earl of Rosslyn	
Robert Hobart, 4th Earl of Buckinghamshire	
George de Grey, 3rd Baron Walsingham	
Charles Cocks, 1st Baron Somers	
Richard Pepper Arden, 1st Baron Alvanley	

The conference met again on 22 June 1802, during which the Lords insisted on an amendment "calculated to prevent the Fraud and Imposition to which the Mode of Proof of the Fact of a Person being a Quaker, hitherto required by Law, and prescribed by the Bill, has been found liable", which was accepted by the Commons.

The bill was granted royal assent on 26 June 1802.

== Provisions ==
The act brought together a number of the Militia Acts which had been passed during the French Revolutionary Wars (1794-1802), repealing them but broadly re-enacting their content. It provided for an "Old Militia" with a total strength of 51,489 in England and Wales (including the City of London, Cinque Ports, and Stannaries), and allowed for a "Supplementary Militia" of half as many again which could be raised with Parliamentary approval.

Each county's Lord Lieutenant would set the amount of militiamen to be raised from the various areas of their country (for example, dividing it by hundreds), and parish constables would draw up lists of all eligible men between 18 and 45. Men were divided into five classes:

1. Under 30, no children
2. Over 30, no children
3. All men, no living children under 14
4. All men, one child under 14
5. All other men

Men were to be drawn from the classes in order - if a quota could be filled only from the first and second classes, the third, fourth and fifth were untouched. A class could be taken in its entirety if it was below the absolute quota, but if larger than the number required, a ballot was to be used. Any man who was taken into service through this process was known as a "principal", and was sworn in to serve as a private soldier for a term of five years, after which they were exempt until a fresh ballot was made, or could volunteer for further service. Instead of serving themselves, they could arrange to provide a "personal substitute" who was willing to serve in their stead; this could be a volunteer already on the local ballot, or someone from elsewhere in the county (or a neighbouring county), and it was expected that they would receive a bounty of a few pounds to encourage them to volunteer. Parishes could also arrange to provide parochial substitutes in lieu of their quota of men, and were allowed to levy a parish rate in order to pay bounties to these substitutes. Finally, any balloted man could pay a fine of £10 and avoid service, though he would be liable to be balloted again after five years. The fines were used to hire substitutes and any surplus would go to regimental funds.

A wide range of men were exempt - most obviously, officers and men of the Army, Navy and Marines, but also peers, clergymen, teachers, university students, constables, sailors, apprentices, or men working in royal arsenals or dockyards. A poor man (defined as one with assets of less than £100) with more than one legitimate child was exempt, as was any poor man physically unfit for service, or any man at all less than 5'4" tall. A man worth more than £100 but unfit for service was still liable to pay his fine or provide a substitute. Quakers were not allowed to avoid service through paying a fine, but were required to find a substitute in lieu of service; if they did not do so, the county was empowered to hire one on his behalf and if necessary seize his property to pay for it.

Any men who died or were discharged as unfit would produce a second ballot of the county (in practice, probably of his local parish) to find a replacement. Should the county fail to provide enough men, it would be fined £10 per head of the annual deficit; this money was to be raised locally and could be used to hire substitutes, but if this failed to achieve the desired result, it was paid to the Treasury.

=== Repealed enactments ===
Section 1 of the act repealed 11 enactments, listed in that section.

Section 1 of the act also provided that the militia raised under the Militia Act 1786 (26 Geo. 3. c. 107) would be subject to all the provisions and regulations under the act, that commissions, service etc. would continue as under previous acts, and that future deficiencies in the number of private militiamen would be supplied under the act.

Citation	Short title	Title	Extent of repeal
26 Geo. 3. c. 107	Militia Act 1786	An Act, passed in the twenty-sixth Year of the Reign of his present Majesty, intituled, An Act for amending, and reducing into one Act of Parliament, the Laws relating to the Militia in that Part of Great Britain called England.	The whole act.
33 Geo. 3. c. 8	Families of Militiamen Act 1793	An Act, passed in the thirty-third Year of the Reign of his present Majesty, intituled, An Act to provide for the Families of Persons chosen by Lot to serve in the Militia of this Kingdom, and of Substitutes serving therein; and to explain and amend an Act of Parliament, passed in the twenty-sixth Year of his present Majesty, intituled, An Act for amend- ing, and reducing into one Act of Parliament, the Laws relating to the Militia in that Part of Great Britain called England.	As relates to Bounties to be paid to Militia Men whose Terms of Service are prolonged. I.e., sections 11 and 12.
35 Geo. 3. c. 83	Artillery Corps, etc. Act 1795	An Act, passed in the thirty-fifth Year of the Reign of his present Majesty, intituled, An Act for augmenting the Royal Corps of Artillery, and providing seafaring Men for the Service of the Navy out of the Private Men now serving in the Militia; and to amend an Act, passed in the twenty-sixth Year of the Reign of his present Majesty, intituled, An Act for amending and reducing into one Act of Parliament the Laws relating to the Militia in that Part of Great Britain called England.	The whole act.
37 Geo. 3. c. 3	Militia Act 1796	Two several Acts, passed in the thirty-seventh Year of the Reign of his present Majesty, relating to the Supplementary Militia.	The whole act.
37 Geo. 3. c. 22	Militia (No. 2) Act 1796	Two several Acts, passed in the thirty-seventh Year of the Reign of his present Majesty, relating to the Supplementary Militia.	The whole act.
38 Geo. 3. c. 18	Supplementary Militia Act 1798	An Act, passed in the thirty-eighth Year of the Reign of his present Majesty, intituled, An Act to enable his Majesty to order out a certain Proportion of the Supplementary Militia; and to provide for the necessary Augmentation of Men in the several Companies of the Militia, by incorporating the Supplementary Militia therewith.	The whole act.
38 Geo. 3. c. 55	Militia (No. 3) Act 1798	Another Act, passed in the thirty-eighth Year aforesaid, intituled, An Act for augmenting the Number of Field Officer and other Officers of Militia; and for making other Provisions concerning the Militia Forces of this Kingdom.	The whole act.
39 Geo. 3. c. 90	Militia (No. 3) Act 1799	An Act, passed in the thirty-ninth Year of the Reign of his present Majesty, intituled, An Act to amend two Acts, passed in the twenty-sixth and thirty-seventh Years of the Reign of his present Majesty, so far as the same relate to the Militia of the Counties of Middlesex and Surrey; and for applying certain Monies remaining in the Hands of the Clerks to the Deputy Lieutenants of the County of Middlesex, and other Persons, towards the completing of the said Militia.	The whole act.
39 Geo. 3. c. 106	Militia (No. 4) Act 1799	Another Act, passed in the thirty-ninth Year aforesaid, intituled, An Act for the Reduction of the Militia Forces, at the Times and in the Manner therein limited; for enabling his Majesty more effectually to increase his Regular Forces for the vigorous Prosecution of the War; and for amending the Laws relating to the Militia.	The whole act.
39 & 40 Geo. 3. c. 1	Militia Act 1799	Another Act, passed in the thirty-ninth and fortieth Years of the Reign of his present Majesty, intituled, An Act for enabling his Majesty to accept the Services of an additional Number of Volunteers from the Militia, under certain Restrictions.	The whole act.
42 Geo. 3. c. 12	Militia Quotas Act 1801	Another Act, passed in the forty-second Year of the Reign of his present Majesty, intituled, An Act to regulate, until the twenty-fifth Day of March One thousand eight hundred and three, the Number of private Militia Men in the several Counties, Ridings, and Places therein mentioned; and for supplying of Vacancies in the Militia.	The whole act.

== Subsequent developments ==
The Militia (Scotland) Act 1802 (42 Geo. 3. c. 91) was passed simultaneously with this act, and the Militia (Ireland) Act 1802 (43 Geo. 3. c. 2) was passed in the next session.

The whole act, except so much of section 18 as prescribes the appointment of clerks to general meetings, was repealed by section 4(1) of, and the second schedule to, the Territorial Army and Militia Act 1921 (11 & 12 Geo. 5 c. 37), which came into force on 1 October 1921.

The whole act was repealed by section 157(1)(b) of, and part II of schedule 10 to, the Reserve Forces Act 1980 (c. 9), which came into force on 20 April 1980.
