= Militia (Stannaries) Act 1802 =

Act of the Parliament of the United Kingdom

Militia (Stannaries) Act 1802 (Note: The citation of this act by this short title was authorised by section 1 of, and the first schedule to, the Short Titles Act 1896. Due to the repeal of those provisions it is now authorised by section 19(2) of the Interpretation Act 1978.)
- Act of Parliament
- Parliament of the United Kingdom
- Long title: An Act for repealing an Act, made in the Thirty-eighth Year of the Reign of His Present Majesty, intituled An Act for raising a Body of Miners in the Counties of Cornwall and Devon, for the Defence of the Kingdom during the present War; and the for more effectually raising and regulating a Body of Miners for the Defence of Great Britain.
- Citation: 42 Geo. 3 c. 72
- Territorial extent: United Kingdom

Dates
- Royal assent: 22 June 1802
- Commencement: 22 June 1802 (Note: The Acts of Parliament (Commencement) Act 1793.)
- Repealed: 17 August 1921
Other legislation
Amended by	Statute Law Revision Act 1872; Statute Law Revision Act 1874; Militia (Voluntary Enlistment) Act 1875; Militia Act 1882; Statute Law Revision Act 1888
Repealed by	Territorial Army and Militia Act 1921
Relates to	Militia Act 1802; Militia (Scotland) Act 1802; Militia (Ireland) Act 1802

Status: Repealed

Text of statute as originally enacted

The Militia (Stannaries) Act 1802 (42 Geo. 3. c. 72) was an act of the Parliament of the United Kingdom affecting the Militia, a locally raised force for home defence. It applied only to the Stannaries of south-western England, and extended the provisions of the main Militia Act 1802 (42 Geo. 3. c. 90) to these jurisdictions.

== Provisions ==
The act brought together a number of the Militia Acts which had been passed during the French Revolutionary Wars (1794–1802), repealing them but broadly re-enacting their content. It provided for an "Old Militia" with a total strength of 51,489 in England and Wales (including the City of London, Cinque Ports, and Stannaries), and allowed for a "Supplementary Militia" of half as many again which could be raised with Parliamentary approval. This particular Act differed only from the main Militia Act in setting the fine for exemption from service at £15, rather than £10 elsewhere in the country.

Each county's Lord Lieutenant would set the amount of militiamen to be raised from the various areas of their country (for example, dividing it by hundreds), and parish constables would draw up lists of all eligible men between 18 and 45. Men were divided into five classes:

1. Under 30, no children
2. Over 30, no children
3. All men, no living children under 14
4. All men, one child under 14
5. All other men

Men were to be drawn from the classes in order – if a quota could be filled only from the first and second classes, the third, fourth and fifth were untouched. A class could be taken in its entirety if it was below the absolute quota, but if larger than the number required, a ballot was to be used. Any man who was taken into service through this process was known as a "principal", and was sworn in to serve as a private soldier for a term of five years, after which they were exempt until a fresh ballot was made, or could volunteer for further service. Instead of serving themselves, they could arrange to provide a "personal substitute" who was willing to serve in their stead; this could be a volunteer already on the local ballot, or someone from elsewhere in the county (or a neighbouring county), and it was expected that they would receive a bounty of a few pounds to encourage them to volunteer. Parishes could also arrange to provide parochial substitutes in lieu of their quota of men, and were allowed to levy a parish rate in order to pay bounties to these substitutes. Finally, any balloted man could pay a fine of £15 and avoid service, though he would be liable to be balloted again after five years. The fines were used to hire substitutes and any surplus would go to regimental funds.

A wide range of men were exempt - most obviously, officers and men of the Army, Navy and Marines, but also peers, clergymen, teachers, university students, constables, sailors, apprentices, or men working in royal arsenals or dockyards. A poor man (defined as one with assets of less than £100) with more than one legitimate child was exempt, as was any poor man physically unfit for service, or any man at all less than 5'4" tall. A man worth more than £100 but unfit for service was still liable to pay his fine or provide a substitute. Quakers were not allowed to avoid service through paying a fine, but were required to find a substitute in lieu of service; if they did not do so, the county was empowered to hire one on his behalf and if necessary seize his property to pay for it.

Any men who died or were discharged as unfit would produce a second ballot of the county (in practice, probably of his local parish) to find a replacement. Should the county fail to provide enough men, it would be fined £10 per head of the annual deficit; this money was to be raised locally and could be used to hire substitutes, but if this failed to achieve the desired result, it was paid to the Treasury.

== Subsequent developments ==
The whole act was repealed by section 4 of, and the second schedule to, the Territorial Army and Militia Act 1921 (11 & 12 Geo. 5. c. 37), which came into force on 1 October 1921.
