= Militia Act 1852 =

Act of the Parliament of the United Kingdom

- Act of Parliament
- Parliament of the United Kingdom
- Long title: An Act to consolidate and amend the Laws relating to the Militia in England.
- Citation: 15 & 16 Vict. c. 50
- Introduced by: Spencer Horatio Walpole MP (Commons)
- Territorial extent: United Kingdom

Dates
- Royal assent: 30 June 1852
- Commencement: 30 June 1852 (Note: The Acts of Parliament (Commencement) Act 1793.)
- Repealed: 1 October 1921
Other legislation
Amends	Militia Act 1802; Militia Act (No. 1) 1803; Militia (Medical Examination) Act 1815
Amended by	Militia (Voluntary Enlistment) Act 1875; Militia Act 1882
Repealed by	Territorial Army and Militia Act 1921
Relates to	Militia Ballots Suspension Act 1851

Status: Repealed

Text of statute as originally enacted

The Militia Act 1852 (15 & 16 Vict. c. 50) was an act of the Parliament of the United Kingdom that consolidated and amended enactments related to the militia of the United Kingdom.

== Passage ==
The House of Commons resolved to consider acts relating to the local militia on 13 February 1852. The committee of the whole house met on 16 February 1852 and reported on 20 February 1852, resolving to bring in a bill to amend and consolidate the laws relating to the militia in England. Leave to bring in the Militia Bill to the House of Commons was granted to Ralph Bernal MP and Henry John Temple, 3rd Viscount Palmerston MP on 29 March 1852. The bill had its first reading in the House of Commons on 3 April 1852, presented by the home secretary, Spencer Horatio Walpole MP. The bill had its second reading in the House of Commons on 26 April 1852 and was committed to a committee of the whole house, which met on 6 May 1852, 7 May 1852, 10 May 1852, 14 May 1852, 17 May 1852, 20 May 1852 and 21 May 1852 and reported on 27 May 1852, with amendments. The amended bill had its third reading in the House of Commons on 7 June 1852 and passed, with amendments.

The bill had its first reading in the House of Lords on 8 June 1852. The bill had its second reading in the House of Lords on 15 June 1852 and was committed to a committee of the whole house, which met on 17 June 1852 and reported on 18 June 1852, with amendments. The amended bill had its third reading in the House of Lords on 21 June 1852 and passed, with amendments.

The amended bill was considered and agreed to by the House of Commons on 22 June 1852.

The bill was granted royal assent on 30 June 1852.

== Provisions ==
Section 3 of the act repealed all provisions of the Militia Act 1802 (42 Geo. 3. c. 90) and any other act "relating to Property Qualifications in the Case of Persons to be appointed Officers in the Militia shall, save as respects Appointments to the Rank of Captain or any higher Rank".

Section 5 of the act extended the provisions of the Militia Act 1802 (42 Geo. 3. c. 90) and the Militia (Medical Examination) Act 1815 (55 Geo. 3. c. 65) and the authorising Officers entitled to Half Pay to receive the same while serving as such Officers as therein mentioned in the Militia, shall extend to Officers entitled to Half Pay who shall be appointed Field Officers in the Militia.

Section 26 of the act repealed for England and Wales the Militia Act (No. 1) 1803 (43 Geo. 3. c. 19) and section 5 of the Militia (Medical Examination) Act 1815 (55 Geo. 3. c. 65).

== Criticism ==
The description of this act as a consolidation act was criticised by William Rogers, a member of the Board for the Revision of the Statute Law, as the act did not in substance repeal any older enactments.

== Subsequent developments ==
The whole act was repealed by section 4 of, and the second schedule to, the Territorial Army and Militia Act 1921 (11 & 12 Geo. 5. c. 37), which came into force on 1 October 1921.
