= Militia Act 1786 =

Act of the Parliament of Great Britain

- Act of Parliament
- Parliament of Great Britain
- Long title: An Act for amending and reducing into one Act of Parliament the Laws relating to the Militia in that Part of Great Britain called England.
- Citation: 26 Geo. 3. c. 107
- Territorial extent: Great Britain

Dates
- Royal assent: 27 June 1786
- Commencement: 24 January 1786 (Note: Start of session.)
- Repealed: 26 June 1802
Other legislation
Amends	See § Repealed enactments
Repeals/revokes	See § Repealed enactments
Amended by	Families of Militiamen Act 1793
Repealed by	Militia Act 1802
Relates to	Militia Act 1757; Militia (Tower Hamlets) Act 1796

Status: Repealed

Text of statute as originally enacted

The Militia Act 1786 (26 Geo. 3. c. 107) was an act of the Parliament of Great Britain that consolidated acts relating to the Militia of Great Britain.

The act was noted by William Blackstone as going further than previous militia acts by providing the power of the Sovereign to shorten the prorogation of Parliament in case of certain emergencies.

== Background ==
Following the restoration of Charles II in 1660, Parliament passed several acts empowering the lord-lieutenant of each county to appoint officers and raise men for the English Militia. In 1662, the City of London Militia Act 1662 (14 Cha. 2. c. 3) was passed, which codified the power of [lord-]lieutenants of places in England and Wales to raise the militia.

Following the formation of Kingdom of Great Britain in 1707, the English Militia was transformed into the British Militia. The militia's usefulness as a military force, never great, declined thereafter, until by the middle of the 18th century it required a major overhaul. This was achieved by the Militia Acts 1757–1762, passed as a response to the threat of a French invasion during the Seven Years' War.

== Provisions ==
Section 95 of the act provided that "in all cases of actual invasion, or upon imminent danger thereof, and in all cases of rebellion or insurrection", the Sovereign could call out the militia and also summon Parliament back if they were adjourned or prorogued.

=== Repealed enactments ===
Section 135 of the act repealed all previous militia acts of Parliament would be repealed on 24 September 1785, except those relating to London, Tower Hamlets, and Cinque Ports, with existing militias becoming subject to the new act's provisions.

Section 136 of the act provided that existing commissions granted under the repealed acts would remain valid, but officers must meet new qualification requirements and submit certificates of qualification to continue serving, and that any previous general and subdivision meetings held under the old laws would remain valid and future scheduled meetings would proceed as planned.

== Subsequent developments ==
In reaction to the refugee crisis from France following the bloodshed and upheaval caused by the French Revolution and Napoleonic rule, the King issued a royal proclamation on 1 December 1792 pursuant to section 95 of the act that "the utmost industry was still employed by evil-disposed persons within the kingdom, acting in concert with persons in foreign parts, with a view to subvert the laws and constitution; and that a spirit of tumult and disorder, thereby excited, had lately shown itself in acts of riot and insurrection — And that, these causes moving him thereto, his majesty had resolved forthwith to embody the militia of the kingdom". On the same day, the King issued another royal proclamation convening the Parliament (which stood prorogued until 3 January 1793), which met on 13 December 1792. This session resulted in the passing of the Aliens Act 1793 (33 Geo. 3. c. 4), which regulated immigration into the country.

The Select Committee on Temporary Laws described this act as a Consolidation Act.

The whole act was repealed by section 1 of the Militia Act 1802 (42 Geo. 3. c. 90), which came into force on 26 June 1802. The 1802 act was passed following the formation of the United Kingdom.
