= Militia (Voluntary Enlistment) Act 1875 =

Act of the Parliament of the United Kingdom

Militia (Voluntary Enlistment) Act 1875 (Note: Section 1.)
- Act of Parliament
- Parliament of the United Kingdom
- Long title: An Act to consolidate and amend certain Laws relating to the Militia of the United Kingdom.
- Citation: 38 & 39 Vict. c. 69
- Territorial extent: United Kingdom

Dates
- Royal assent: 11 August 1875
- Commencement: 11 August 1875 (Note: The Acts of Parliament (Commencement) Act 1793.)
- Repealed: 1 January 1883
Other legislation
Amends	See § Repealed enactments
Repeals/revokes	See § Repealed enactments
Repealed by	Militia Act 1882

Status: Repealed

Text of statute as originally enacted

The Militia (Voluntary Enlistment) Act 1875 (38 & 39 Vict. c. 69) was an act of the Parliament of the United Kingdom that consolidated enactments related to the militia of the United Kingdom.

== Provisions ==
=== Repealed enactments ===
Section 98 of the act repealed 38 enactments, listed in parts I, II and III of the schedule to the act.

Acts relating to the United Kingdom, Great Britain or England
Citation	Short title	Description	Extent of repeal
37 Geo. 3. c. 25	Militia (Tower Hamlets) Act 1796	An Act for the better raising and ordering the Militia forces of the Tower Hamlets, in the county of Middlesex.	Sections eight to twelve.
42 Geo. 3. c. 72	Militia (Stannaries) Act 1802	An Act for repealing an Act, made in the Thirty-eighth Year of the Reign of His present Majesty, intituled An Act for raising a Body of Miners in the Counties of Cornwall and Devon, for the Defence of the Kingdom during the present War; and for the more effectually raising and regulating a Body of Miners for the Defence of Great Britain.	Sections twenty to twenty-seven and thirty-two.
42 Geo. 3. c. 90	Militia Act 1802	An Act for amending the Laws relating to the Militia in England, and for augmenting the Militia.	Sections one to seventeen and sixty-one, section sixty-four to "twenty pounds;", sections sixty-eight to ninety-nine, one hundred and one to one hundred and twenty-one, one hundred and twenty-seven, one hundred and forty to one hundred and forty-seven and one hundred and seventy-two to one hundred and seventy-six, and schedules F. and G.
43 Geo. 3. c. 47	Relief of Families of Militiamen Act 1803	An Act for consolidating and amending the several Laws for providing Relief for the Families of Militiamen of England, when called out into actual Service.	The whole act.
46 Geo. 3. c. 90	Defence of the Realm (No. 2) Act 1806	An Act to enable His Majesty annually to train and exercise a Proportion of His Subjects in England, under certain Regulations, and more effectually to provide for the Defence of the Realm.	The whole act.
46 Geo. 3. c. 140	Militia (No. 2) Act 1806	An Act to amend Two Acts, passed in the Forty-second Year of His present Majesty, relating to the Militia of England and Scotland respectively, as to the Pay of the Officers and Men of the said Militia.	The whole act.
51 Geo. 3. c. 114	Militia (Stannaries) Act 1811	An Act to permit the Services of the Regiment of Miners of Cornwall and Devon to be extended to Ireland.	Sections three, six, seven and nine.
51 Geo. 3. c. 118	Militia (No. 2) Act 1811	An Act to permit the Interchange of the British and Irish Militias respectively.	Sections three, five to seven and ten.
53 Geo. 3. c. 81	Militia Act 1813	An Act to amend several Acts relating to the Militia, and to enlisting of the Militia into His Majesty's Regular Forces.	The whole act.
55 Geo. 3. c. 65	Militia (Medical Examination) Act 1815	An Act to amend the Laws relating to the Militia of Great Britain.	Sections five, seven, and nine.
55 Geo. 3. c. 168	Militia (No. 2) Act 1815	An Act to explain and amend the Laws relating to the Militias of Great Britain and Ireland.	The whole act.
56 Geo. 3. c. 64	Militia Act 1816	An Act to repeal several Acts relating to the Militia of Great Britain, and to amend other Acts relating thereto.	The whole act.
57 Geo. 3. c. 57	Militia Act 1817	An Act to empower His Majesty to suspend Training, and to regulate the Quotas of the Militia.	The whole act.
10 Geo. 4. c. 10	Militia Act 1829	An Act to suspend, until the End of the next Session of Parliament, the making of Lists and the Ballots and Enrolments for the Militia of the United Kingdom, and to reduce the permanent Staff, and regulate the Allowances of Serjeants hereafter appointed.	The whole act.
2 & 3 Vict. c. 59	Militia Officers Act 1839	An Act for taking away the Exemption, except in certain Cases, of Officers of the Militia to serve as Sheriff.	The whole act.
15 & 16 Vict. c. 50	Militia Act 1852	An Act to consolidate and amend the Laws relating to the Militia in England.	Sections one to seven, eleven to seventeen, nineteen, twenty, twenty-two, twenty-five to twenty-nine, thirty-three and thirty-four.
17 & 18 Vict. c. 13	Militia Act 1854	An Act to amend the Acts relating to the Militia of the United Kingdom.	The whole act.
17 & 18 Vict. c. 105	Militia Law Amendment Act 1854	An Act to amend the Laws relating to the Militia in England and Wales.	Sections thirty-one to thirty-six, thirty-eight to fifty-one, fifty-three, fifty-five and fifty-six, and schedule C.
18 & 19 Vict. c. 1	Militia (No. 1) Act 1855	An Act to enable Her Majesty to accept the Services of the Militia out of the United Kingdom, for the vigorous Prosecution of the War.	The whole act.
18 & 19 Vict. c. 100	Officers of the Militia Act 1855	An Act to amend the Law concerning the Qualification of Officers of the Militia.	The whole act.
22 & 23 Vict. c. 38	Militia Act 1859	An Act further to amend the Laws relating to the Militia.	The whole act.
23 & 24 Vict. c. 94	Militia (Storehouses) Act 1860	An Act to amend the Laws relating to the Militia.	Sections one and thirteen to nineteen.
32 & 33 Vict. c. 13	Militia Act 1869	An Act for amending the Law relating to the Militia.	The whole act.
33 & 34 Vict. c. 68	Militia Act 1870	An Act to amend the Acts relating to the Militia of the United Kingdom.	The whole act.
36 & 37 Vict. c. 68	Militia (Lands and Buildings) Act 1873	An Act for extending the Period of Service in the Militia; and for other purposes.	Sections one to five.

Acts relating to Scotland
Citation	Short title	Description	Extent of repeal
42 Geo. 3. c. 91	Militia (Scotland) Act 1802	An Act to raise and establish a Militia Force in Scotland.	Sections one to twelve and fifty-six, section fifty-nine to "twenty pounds;", sections sixty, sixty-three to ninety-five, ninety-seven to one hundred and seventeen, one hundred and twenty-two, one hundred and thirty-five to one hundred and forty, one hundred and forty-four to one hundred and forty-eight, and one hundred and sixty-seven to one hundred and seventy-two, and schedules F. and G.
49 Geo. 3. c. 90	Relief of Families of Militiamen (Scotland) Act 1809	An Act for providing Relief for the Wives and Families of the Militia Men in Scotland, when called into actual Service.	The whole act.
17 & 18 Vict. c. 106	Militia (Scotland) Act 1854	An Act for amending the Laws relating to the Militia, and raising a Volunteer Militia Force in Scotland.	Sections two to eleven, thirteen to thirty-five and forty-three to sixty-eight, section sixty-nine except so far as it relates to the Naval Coast Volunteers, sections seventy to seventy-seven, and the Schedule.

Acts relating to Ireland
Citation	Short title	Description	Extent of repeal
49 Geo. 3. c. 120	Militia (Ireland) Act 1809	An Act for amending and reducing into One Act of Parliament the several Laws for raising and training the Militia of Ireland.	Sections seven to sixty-two. Section sixty-three to "twenty pounds;". Sections one hundred and twenty-two and one hundred and forty-three.
51 Geo. 3. c. 78	Relief of Families of Militiamen (Ireland) Act 1811	An Act to make Provision in certain Cases for the Wives and Families of Serjeants, Corporals, Drummers, and Privates serving in the Militia of Ireland.	The whole act.
52 Geo. 3. c. 28	Relief of Families of Militiamen (Ireland) Act 1812	An Act to amend an Act of the last Session of Parliament making Provision for the Families of Militia Men in Ireland.	The whole act.
52 Geo. 3. c. 29	Militia (Ireland) Act 1812	An Act to amend the Laws relating to the Militia of Ireland.	The whole act.
53 Geo. 3. c. 48	Local Militia (Ireland) Act 1813	An Act to amend the Laws for raising and training the Militia of Ireland.	Section two.
53 Geo. 3. c. 154	Kilmainham Hospital (Pensions Commutation) Act 1813	An Act to render valid, and to authorize the Payment and Granting of certain Pensions at Kilmainham Hospital, and to empower the Commissioners of the said Hospital to commute Pensions for a Sum of Money in certain cases.	Sections one and six.
54 Geo. 3. c. 179	Militia (Ireland) Act 1814	An Act to amend an Act passed in the Forty-ninth Year of His present Majesty's reign, intituled An Act for amending and reducing into One Act of Parliament the several Laws for raising and training the Militia of Ireland.	Section three.
1 & 2 Will. 4. c. 17	Custos Rotulorum (Ireland) Act 1831	An Act to provide for the better Order and Government of Ireland, by Lieutenants for the several Counties, Counties of Cities, and Counties of Towns therein.	The whole act.
17 & 18 Vict. c. 107	Militia (Ireland) Act 1854	An Act to amend the Laws relating to the Militia, and for raising a Volunteer Militia Force, in Ireland.	Sections one to thirty-five, and schedule C.
18 & 19 Vict. c. 19	Militia (Ireland) Act 1855	An Act to remove Doubts as to the Commissions of Officers of Militia in Ireland who have omitted to deliver unto the Clerk of the Peace Descriptions of their Qualifications, and to indemnify them against the Consequences of such Omission, and to amend the Law relating to the Militia in Ireland.	The whole act.

== Subsequent developments ==
The whole act was repealed by section 54 of, and the second schedule to, the Militia Act 1882 (45 & 46 Vict. c. 49), which came into force on 1 January 1883.
