= Militia (Ireland) Act 1802 =

Act of the Parliament of the United Kingdom

- Act of Parliament
- Parliament of the United Kingdom
- Long title: An Act for the more speedy and effectual Enrolment of the Militia of Ireland; and for filling up Vacancies therein.
- Citation: 43 Geo. 3. c. 2
- Territorial extent: United Kingdom

Dates
- Royal assent: 17 December 1802
- Commencement: 17 December 1802 (Note: The Acts of Parliament (Commencement) Act 1793.)
- Repealed: 6 August 1861
Other legislation
Amended by	Militia (Ireland) Act 1803
Repealed by	Statute Law Revision Act 1861
Relates to	Militia Act 1802; Militia (Scotland) Act 1802; Militia (Ireland) Act 1809

Status: Repealed

Text of statute as originally enacted

The Militia (Ireland) Act 1802 (43 Geo. 3. c. 2) was an act of the Parliament of the United Kingdom affecting the Militia, a locally raised force for home defence. It applied only to the Kingdom of Ireland, with the Militia Act 1802 (42 Geo. 3. c. 90) and Militia (Scotland) Act 1802 (42 Geo. 3. c. 91) applying elsewhere in the country.

The Militia (Ireland) Act 1809 (49 Geo. 3. c. 120) consolidated enactments of the Parliament of Ireland relating to the Irish Militia.

== Provisions ==
The act brought together a number of the Militia Acts which had been passed during the French Revolutionary Wars (1794-1802), repealing them but broadly re-enacting their content. It provided for a Militia with an established strength of 15,000 men in Ireland (set against 51,489 in England and Wales, and 8,000 in Scotland).

The Irish militia was to be raised entirely from volunteers, unlike units in England, Wales, and Scotland, which were recruited by ballot. This was a deliberate decision to avoid civil unrest. The Lord-Lieutenant of Ireland was empowered to recruit volunteers over a four-month period after the act was passed, paying a bounty of two guineas to each recruit. Men were liable to serve for five years or, if called into active service in this period, until the Militia was disembodied.

== Subsequent developments ==
The sum set aside for recruiting was £40,000, enough to recruit 19–20,000 men, though the notional strength was only 15,000. In the event, this was insufficient; the Militia (Ireland) Act 1803 (43 Geo. 3. c. 33) was passed in April 1803 to double the bounty to four guineas, as not enough volunteers had come forward to make up the desired numbers.

The whole act was repealed by section 1 of, and the schedule to, the Statute Law Revision Act 1861 (24 & 25 Vict. c. 101), which came into force on 6 August 1861.
