= Militia Act 1882 =

Act of the Parliament of the United Kingdom

Militia Act 1882 (Note: Section 1.)
- Act of Parliament
- Parliament of the United Kingdom
- Long title: An Act to consolidate the Acts relating to the Militia.
- Citation: 45 & 46 Vict. c. 49
- Territorial extent: United Kingdom

Dates
- Royal assent: 18 August 1882
- Commencement: 1 January 1883 (Note: Section 2.)
- Repealed: 20 April 1980
Other legislation
Amends	See § Repealed enactments
Repeals/revokes	See § Repealed enactments
Amended by	Reserve Forces and Militia Act 1898; Territorial Army and Militia Act 1921; Statute Law Revision Act 1950; Statute Law Revision Act 1963; Statute Law Revision Act 1964; Northern Ireland (Lieutenancy) Order 1975
Repealed by	Reserve Forces Act 1980
Relates to	Reserve Forces Act 1882; Regulation of the Forces Act 1881; Army Act 1881; Territorial Army and Militia Act 1921

Status: Repealed

Text of statute as originally enacted

The Militia Act 1882 (45 & 46 Vict. c. 49) was an act of the Parliament of the United Kingdom that consolidated enactments related to the militia of the United Kingdom. The act re-enacted, with modifications made necessary by the Regulation of the Forces Act 1881 (44 & 45 Vict. c. 57) and the Army Act 1881 (c. 58), the Militia (Voluntary Enlistment) Act 1875 (38 & 39 Vict. c. 69), which had itself consolidated earlier enactments applicable to the militia of the United Kingdom.

== Provisions ==
=== Repealed enactments ===
Section 54 of the act repealed 27 enactments, listed in the second schedule to the act.

Citation	Short title	Description	Extent of repeal
37 Geo. 3. c. 25	Militia (Tower Hamlets) Act 1796	An Act for the better raising and ordering the militia forces of Tower Hamlets in the county of Middlesex.	Section three, from "and also such" to "the said Hamlets," and sections thirteen, fourteen, and sixteen to eighteen.
42 Geo. 3. c. 72	Militia (Stannaries) Act 1802	An Act for repealing an Act made in the thirty-eighth year of the reign of His present Majesty, intituled "An Act for raising a body of miners in the counties of Cornwall and Devon, for the defence of the Kingdom during the present war"; and for the more effectually raising and regulating a body of miners for the defence of Great Britain.	Section one, from "and the said warden shall constitute" to "are entitled to rank," sections two, three, and thirty-one, section thirty-three, from "and that all fines" to the end of the section, and sections thirty-four and thirty-five.
42 Geo. 3. c. 90	Militia Act 1802	An Act for amending the laws relating to militia in England, and for augmenting the militia.	Section one hundred and forty-eight, section one hundred and forty-nine, the words "and officers," and from "and such number of officers" to the end of the section, section one hundred and fifty, from "shall appoint" to "and shall and," and from "and shall appoint five" to the end of the section, and sections one hundred and fifty-one, one hundred and fifty-two, one hundred and seventy-one, one hundred and seventy-seven, and one hundred and seventy-eight.
42 Geo. 3. c. 91	Militia (Scotland) Act 1802	An Act to raise and establish a militia force in Scotland.	Sections fifteen, thirty-two, one hundred and forty-one, one hundred and forty-two, one hundred and forty-three, one hundred and sixty-six, one hundred and seventy-three, and one hundred and seventy-four.
43 Geo. 3. c. 50	Militia Act 1803	An Act for more speedily completing the militia of Great Britain, raised under two Acts passed in the forty-second year of the reign of His present Majesty; and for amending the said Acts.	Section five, section six, from "either for the purpose" to "for that purpose or," and section eight.
49 Geo. 3. c. 120	Militia (Ireland) Act 1809	An Act for amending and reducing into one Act of Parliament the several laws for raising and training the militia of Ireland.	Sections two, three, five, six, section one hundred and eighteen, from "every such person" to "by virtue of this Act, and," sections one hundred and thirty to one hundred and thirty-eight, section one hundred and forty-one, from "or within four months" to "enrolling volunteers," and sections one hundred and forty-five to one hundred and forty-seven.
51 Geo. 3. c. 114	Militia (Stannaries) Act 1811	An Act to permit the services of the regiment of miners of Cornwall and Devon to be extended to Ireland.	The whole Act so far as unrepealed.
51 Geo. 3. c. 118	Militia (No. 2) Act 1811	An Act to permit the interchange of the British and Irish militias respectively.	The whole Act so far as unrepealed.
52 Geo. 3. c. 29	Militia (Ireland) Act 1812	An Act to amend the laws relating to the militia of Ireland.	The whole Act so far as unrepealed.
53 Geo. 3. c. 48	Local Militia (Ireland) Act 1813	An Act to amend the laws for raising and training the militia of Ireland.	Sections three to five.
53 Geo. 3. c. 132	Militia (Tower Hamlets) Act 1813	An Act to extend the services of the militia of the Tower Hamlets to all parts of the United Kingdom.	The whole Act so far as unrepealed.
55 Geo. 3. c. 65	Militia (Medical Examination) Act 1815	An Act to amend the laws relating to the militia of Great Britain.	The whole Act so far as unrepealed, except section eight.
1 Geo. 4. c. 100	Militia (City of London) Act 1820	An Act for amending and reducing into one Act of Parliament, two several Acts passed in the thirty-sixth and thirty-ninth years of the reign of His late Majesty King George the Third, for the better ordering and further regulating of the militia of the city of London.	Sections two, four, five, and seven, section nine, as to the form of oath thereby prescribed, sections nineteen to twenty-one, twenty-three to twenty-six, and twenty-nine, section forty-two, from "provided always" to the end of the section, sections forty-six and forty-seven, section forty-eight, from "provided always" to the end of the section, and section forty-nine.
15 & 16 Vict. c. 50	Militia Act 1852	An Act to consolidate and amend the laws in relation to the militia in England.	Sections eight and nine, section twenty-four, the words "as herein-before directed," section thirty, section thirty-one, section thirty-five, section thirty-six, from "but the number" to the end of the section, and section thirty-eight from "in apportioning" down to "but so that," and from "and the oath to be taken," down to "sovereign for the time being."
17 & 18 Vict. c. 105	Militia Law Amendment Act 1854	The Militia Law Amendment Act, 1854.	Section fifty-two.
23 & 24 Vict. c. 94	Militia (Storehouses) Act 1860	An Act to amend the laws relating to the militia.	Sections ten to twelve, section twenty, and section twenty-one.
23 & 24 Vict. c. 120	Militia (Ballot) Act 1860	An Act to amend the laws relating to the ballots for the militia in England, and to suspend the making of lists and ballots for the militia of the United Kingdom.	Section nineteen.
28 & 29 Vict. c. 46	Militia (Ballot Suspension) Act 1865	An Act to suspend the making of lists and the ballots for the militia of the United Kingdom.	Section four from "or of any meeting" to the end of the section.
32 & 33 Vict. c. 66	Militia Pay Act 1869	An Act to continue and amend an Act to defray the charge of the pay, clothing, and contingent and other expenses of the disembodied militia in Great Britain and Ireland; to grant allowances in certain cases to subaltern officers, adjutants, paymasters, quartermasters, surgeons, assistant surgeons, and surgeons' mates of the militia; and to authorise the employment of the non-commissioned officers.	The whole act.
33 & 34 Vict. c. 67	Army Enlistment Act 1870	The Army Enlistment Act, 1870.	Section twenty, so far as it relates to the Militia.
34 & 35 Vict. c. 86	Regulation of the Forces Act 1871	The Regulation of the Forces Act, 1871.	Section six from "saving nevertheless to the lieutenants of counties," down to "proceedings incidental thereto," and so much of the rest of the section as relates to the Militia; so much of section seven as relates to the Militia; sections eight and fourteen; the words "militia or" wherever they occur in section seventeen, section eighteen, and the definition of "militia" in section nineteen.
36 & 37 Vict. c. 84	Militia Pay and Storehouses Act 1873	An Act to explain the Militia Pay Acts, 1868 and 1869, and to facilitate the sale of property held for militia purposes.	Section one.
37 & 38 Vict. c. 29	Militia Law Amendment Act 1874	The Militia Law Amendment Act, 1874.	The whole act.
38 & 39 Vict. c. 69	Militia (Voluntary Enlistment) Act 1875	The Militia (Voluntary Enlistment) Act, 1875.	The whole act.
41 & 42 Vict. c. 10	Mutiny Act 1878	An Act for punishing mutiny and desertion, and for the better payment of the army and their quarters.	Sections forty-four, fifty-seven, fifty-eight, and eighty, and the schedule.
42 & 43 Vict. c. 32	Army Discipline and Regulation (Commencement) Act 1879	The Army Discipline and Regulation (Commencement) Act, 1879.	Section five from "as respects" to "and also," and so much of the rest of the section as keeps in force any portion of the Army Mutiny Act relating to the Militia.
44 & 45 Vict. c. 57	Regulation of the Forces Act 1881	The Regulation of the Forces Act, 1881.	Section two from "the expression militia" to "non-commissioned officer," sections three to eight, and so much of sections thirty-eight, thirty-nine and fifty-three as relates to the Militia.

== Subsequent developments ==
Sections 3 to 28 and 37 to 47, and part of section 54, of the act were repealed by section 4 of, and the second schedule to, the Territorial Army and Militia Act 1921 (11 & 12 Geo. 5. c. 37), which came into force on 1 October 1921.

Section 54(1) of the act was repealed by section 1(1) of, and the first schedule to, the Statute Law Revision Act 1950 (14 Geo. 6. c. 6), which came into force on 23 May 1950.

Section 53(10) of the act was repealed by section 1 of, and the schedule to, the Statute Law Revision Act 1963, which came into force on 31 July 1963.

Section 54 of the act was repealed by section 1 of, and the schedule to, the Statute Law Revision Act 1964, which came into force on 31 July 1964.

The whole act was repealed by section 157(1)(b) of, and part II of schedule 10 to, the Reserve Forces Act 1980, which came into force on 20 April 1980.
