= Militia Act 1762 =

Act of the Parliament of Great Britain

- Act of Parliament
- Parliament of Great Britain
- Long title: An Act to explain, amend, and reduce into One Act of Parliament, the several Laws now in being, relating to the raising and training the Militia within that Part of Great Britain called England.
- Citation: 2 Geo. 3. c. 20
- Territorial extent: Great Britain

Dates
- Royal assent: 8 April 1762
- Commencement: 8 April 1762 (Note: Section 1.)
- Expired: 8 April 1769 (Note: Section 148.)
- Repealed: 15 July 1867
Other legislation
Repealed by	Statute Law Revision Act 1867

Status: Repealed

Text of statute as originally enacted

The Militia Act 1762 (2 Geo. 3. c. 20) was an act of the Parliament of Great Britain that consolidated the acts related to the Militia of Great Britain.

The act established a more structured militia and reduced the age of men eligible for military service from 18–50 to 18–42. Officers were drawn from the property-owning class, and men could avoid service by paying a substitute.

== Background ==
The British Militia was the principal military reserve force of the Kingdom of Great Britain. Militia units were repeatedly raised in Great Britain during the Georgian era for internal security duties and to defend against external invasions.

After the outbreak of the Seven Years' War, the Militia Act 1757 (30 Geo. 2. c. 25) led to the rapid expansion of the British Militia in order to defend from potential French invasions. The act was passed to consolidate the Militia Acts 1757–1762 and increase the effectiveness of the militia.

== Subsequent developments ==
The whole act was repealed by section 1 of, and the schedule to, the Statute Law Revision Act 1867 (30 & 31 Vict. c. 59).
