= Royal Naval Reserve Act 1902 =

Act of the Parliament of the United Kingdom

Royal Naval Reserve Act 1902 (Note: Section 2.)
- Act of Parliament
- Parliament of the United Kingdom
- Long title: An Act to amend section one of the Royal Naval Reserve (Volunteer) Act, 1896.
- Citation: 2 Edw. 7. c. 5
- Territorial extent: United Kingdom

Dates
- Royal assent: 22 July 1902
- Commencement: 22 July 1902 (Note: The Acts of Parliament (Commencement) Act 1793.)
- Repealed: 20 April 1980
Other legislation
Amends	Royal Naval Reserve (Volunteer) Act 1896
Repealed by	Reserve Forces Act 1980

Status: Repealed

Text of statute as originally enacted

The Royal Naval Reserve Act 1902 (2 Edw. 7. c. 5) was an act of the Parliament of the United Kingdom, given royal assent on 22 July 1902 and formally repealed in 1980.

It amended the Royal Naval Reserve (Volunteer) Act 1896 by omitting the words "serving on a vessel registered in the British Isles", and deeming these to have always been omitted. This amended section also applied to men raised under the provisions of the Naval Reserve Act 1900.

== Subsequent developments ==
The whole act was repealed by section 157(1)(b) of, and part II of schedule 10 to, the Reserve Forces Act 1980 (c. 9), which came into force on 20 April 1980.
