= Relief of Families of Militiamen Act 1803 =

Act of the Parliament of the United Kingdom

- Act of Parliament
- Parliament of the United Kingdom
- Long title: An Act for consolidating and amending the several Laws for providing Relief for the Families of Militia Men of England, when called out into actual Service.
- Citation: 43 Geo. 3. c. 47
- Territorial extent: United Kingdom

Dates
- Royal assent: 27 May 1803
- Commencement: 27 May 1803 (Note: The Acts of Parliament (Commencement) Act 1793.)
- Repealed: 11 August 1875
Other legislation
Repeals/revokes	See § Repealed enactments
Repealed by	Militia (Voluntary Enlistment) Act 1875

Status: Repealed

Text of statute as originally enacted

The Relief of Families of Militiamen Act 1803 (43 Geo. 3. c. 47) was an act of the Parliament of the United Kingdom that consolidated and amended earlier enactments providing relief for the families of militiamen in England when the militia was called out into actual service.

== Provisions ==
=== Repealed enactments ===
Section 1 of the act repealed 4 enactments, listed in that section, save and except as to all cases relating to the repayment or reimbursement of any sum of money already advanced or paid under any of the repealed acts, and to the allowing, accounting for, or recovering of any such sum, or any arrears of it remaining unpaid, or to any fines, penalties, or forfeitures relating to it.

Citation	Short title	Description	Extent of repeal
33 Geo. 3. c. 8	Families of Militiamen Act 1793	An Act to provide for the Families of Persons chosen by Lot to serve in the Militia of this Kingdom, and of Substitutes serving therein; and to explain and amend an Act of Parliament, passed in the Twenty-sixth Year of His present Majesty, intituled, "An Act for amending and reducing into One Act of Parliament, the Laws relating to the Militia in that Part of Great Britain called England."	The whole act.
34 Geo. 3. c. 47	Families of Militiamen, etc. Act 1794	An Act to amend an Act, passed in the last Session of Parliament, intituled, "An Act to provide for the Families of Persons chosen by Lot to serve in the Militia of this Kingdom, and of Substitutes serving therein; and to explain and amend an Act of Parliament, passed in the Twenty-sixth Year of His present Majesty, intituled, 'An Act for amending and reducing into One Act of Parliament, the Laws relating to the Militia in that Part of Great Britain called England;'" and also an Act, made in that Session of Parliament, intituled, "An Act for augmenting the Militia."	The whole act.
35 Geo. 3. c. 81	Families of Militiamen Act 1795	An Act to apportion the Relief by the several Statutes then in force directed to be given to the Families of Non-commissioned Officers, Drummers, Fifers, and Privates, serving in the Militia, between the County at large and the peculiar Districts therein not contributing to the County Rate, according to the Number of Men serving for each in such Militia; and to remove certain Difficulties in respect to the Relief of Families of Substitutes, hired Men, or Volunteers serving in the Militia.	The whole act.
36 Geo. 3. c. 114	Families of Militiamen, etc. Act 1796	An Act to explain and amend an Act, passed in the Thirty-third Year of His present Majesty's Reign, intituled, "An Act to provide for the Families of Persons chosen by Lot to serve in the Militia of this Kingdom, and of Substitutes serving therein; and to explain and amend an Act of Parliament, passed in the Twenty-sixth Year of His present Majesty, intituled, 'An Act for amending and reducing into One Act of Parliament, the Laws relating to the Militia in that Part of Great Britain called England.'"	The whole act.

== Subsequent developments ==
The whole act was repealed by section 98 of, and the schedule to, the Militia (Voluntary Enlistment) Act 1875 (38 & 39 Vict.. c. 69), which came into force on 11 August 1875.
