= Officers' Commissions Act 1862 =

Act of the Parliament of the United Kingdom

Officers' Commissions Act 1862 (Note: The citation of this act by this short title was authorised by section 1 of, and the first schedule to, the Short Titles Act 1896. Due to the repeal of those provisions it is now authorised by section 19(2) of the Interpretation Act 1978.)
- Act of Parliament
- Parliament of the United Kingdom
- Long title: An Act to enable Her Majesty to issue Commissions to the Officers of Her Majesty’s Land Forces and Royal Marines, and to Adjutants and Quartermasters of Her Militia and Volunteer Forces, without affixing Her Royal Sign Manual thereto.
- Citation: 25 & 26 Vict. c. 4
- Territorial extent: United Kingdom

Dates
- Royal assent: 11 April 1862
- Commencement: 11 April 1862 (Note: The Acts of Parliament (Commencement) Act 1793.)
Other legislation
| Amended by | Statute Law Revision Act 1893; Territorial Army and Militia Act 1921; Defence (Transfer of Functions) (No.1) Order 1964; Armed Forces Act 1981 |

Status: Amended

Text of statute as originally enacted

Revised text of statute as amended

Text of the Officers' Commissions Act 1862 as in force today (including any amendments) within the United Kingdom, from legislation.gov.uk.

The Officers' Commissions Act 1862 (25 & 26 Vict. c. 4) is an act of the Parliament of the United Kingdom.

The act provided that any officer's commission in the British Army could be issued without the royal sign-manual, provided that it was signed by a principal secretary of state and the commander in chief, or an appropriate officer depending on the specific branch of service. For the Royal Marines, a signature from the Admiralty was required.

The act, whilst amended to reflect changes in the military and political structure since 1862, is still in force.
