= Auxiliary Forces Act 1953 =

Act of the Parliament of the United Kingdom

Auxiliary Forces Act 1953 (Note: Section 50(1).)
- Act of Parliament
- Parliament of the United Kingdom
- Long title: An Act to consolidate certain enactments and Orders in Council relating to the Territorial Army and the Royal Auxiliary Air Force with corrections and improvements made under the Consolidation of Enactments (Procedure) Act, 1949.
- Citation: 1 & 2 Eliz. 2. c. 50
- Territorial extent: United Kingdom

Dates
- Royal assent: 29 October 1953
- Commencement: 1 January 1954 (Note: Section 50(2).)
- Repealed: 20 April 1980
Other legislation
Amends	See § Repealed enactments
Repeals/revokes	See § Repealed enactments
Amended by	London Government Act 1963; Law Reform (Miscellaneous Provisions) (Scotland) Act 1980
Repealed by	Revision of the Army and Air Force Acts (Transitional Provisions) Act 1955; Mental Health (Scotland) Act 1960; Northern Ireland Act 1962; Defence (Transfer of Functions) (No. 1) Order 1964; Theft Act 1968; Armed Forces Act 1971; Criminal Justice Act 1972; Local Government (Scotland) Act 1973; Statute Law (Repeals) Act 1974; Statute Law (Repeals) Act 1976; Statute Law (Repeals) Act 1977; Reserve Forces Act 1980

Status: Repealed

Text of statute as originally enacted

The Auxiliary Forces Act 1953 (1 & 2 Eliz. 2. c. 50) was an act of the Parliament of the United Kingdom that consolidated enactments relating to the Territorial Army and the Royal Auxiliary Air Force in the United Kingdom.

== Provisions ==
=== Repealed enactments ===
Section 44(1) of the act repealed 6 enactments, listed in part I of the fifth schedule to the act. Section 44(2) of the act revoked 5 Orders in Council, listed in part II of that schedule.

Part I - enactments repealed
Citation	Short title	Extent of repeal
7 Edw. 7. c. 9	Territorial and Reserve Forces Act 1907	The whole Act, except subsection (1) of section twenty-three, subsection (1) of section twenty-eight, sections thirty-six and forty-one, and the First Schedule.
7 & 8 Geo. 5. c. 51	Air Force (Constitution) Act 1917	In section six, subsection (1).
11 & 12 Geo. 5. c. 37	Territorial Army and Militia Act 1921	Section one.
14 & 15 Geo. 5. c. 15	Auxiliary Air Force and Air Force Reserve Act 1924	Section five.
11 & 12 Geo. 6. c. 64	National Service Act 1948	In section twenty-six, subsection (5).
12, 13 & 14 Geo. 6. c. 96	Auxiliary and Reserve Forces Act 1949	Sections one to six; section seventeen so far as it relates to the Territorial Army; in section eighteen, subsection (2); and the First Schedule so far as it relates to the Territorial and Reserve Forces Act, 1907.

Part II - Orders in Council repealed
Reference	Title	Extent of revocation
SR&O 1924/1212	Auxiliary Air Force Order 1924	The whole Order, except so far as it applies subsection (1) of section twenty-three of the Territorial and Reserve Forces Act, 1907, to the Royal Auxiliary Air Force.
SR&O 1927/1081	Auxiliary Air Force Order 1927	The whole order.
SI 1949/1844	National Service (Adaptation of Enactments) (Military and Air Forces) Order 1949	In Part II of the Schedule to the Order, paragraphs 11 to 18.
SI 1950/834	Royal Auxiliary Air Force Order 1950	The whole order.
SI 1950/1043	Royal Auxiliary Air Force (No. 2) Order 1950	The whole order.

== Subsequent developments ==
In section 39(3) of the act, the words "and shall be exempt from serving on any jury" and the proviso were repealed by section 64(2) of, and part I of schedule 6 to, the Criminal Justice Act 1972, which came into force on 30 March 1974.

Section 44 of, and schedule 5 to, the act were repealed by section 1 of, and part XI of the schedule to, the Statute Law (Repeals) Act 1974, which came into force on 27 June 1974.

Sections 45 and 46(6) of the act were repealed by section 1(1) of, and part IV of schedule 1 to, the Statute Law (Repeals) Act 1976, which came into force on 27 May 1976.

The whole act was repealed by section 157(1)(b) of, and part II of schedule 10 to, the Reserve Forces Act 1980, which came into force on 20 April 1980.
