= Reserve Forces Act 1980 =

Act of the Parliament of the United Kingdom

Reserve Forces Act 1980 (Note: Section 158(1).)
- Act of Parliament
- Parliament of the United Kingdom
- Long title: An Act to consolidate certain enactments relating to the reserve and auxiliary forces, and the lieutenancies, with amendments to give effect to a recommendation of the Law Commission; and to repeal certain obsolete enactments relating to those forces.
- Citation: 1980 c. 9
- Territorial extent: United Kingdom (Note: Section 158(2).)

Dates
- Royal assent: 20 March 1980
- Commencement: 20 April 1980 (Note: Section 158(4).)

Other legislation
- Amends: Pensions (Increase) Act 1971; See § Repealed enactments
- Repeals/revokes: See § Repealed enactments
- Amended by: Armed Forces Act 1981; Reserve Forces Act 1982; Reserve Forces (Safeguard of Employment) Act 1985; Statute Law (Repeals) Act 1993; Reserve Forces Act 1996; Lieutenancies Act 1997; Reserve Forces Act 1996 (Transitional, Consequential and Saving Provisions) Regulations 1997; Defence Reform Act 2014

Status: Partially repealed

Text of statute as originally enacted

Revised text of statute as amended

Text of the Reserve Forces Act 1980 as in force today (including any amendments) within the United Kingdom, from legislation.gov.uk.

The Reserve Forces Act 1980 (c. 9) is an act of the Parliament of the United Kingdom that consolidated enactments relating to the reserve and auxiliary forces and the lieutenancies in the United Kingdom.

== Provisions ==
=== Repealed enactments ===
Sections 157(1)(a) and 157(1)(b) of the act repealed 47 enactments, listed in parts I and II of the schedule 10 to the act, respectively.

Part I — Repeal of obsolete enactments
Citation	Short title	Extent of repeal
14 Geo. 6. c. 32	Army Reserve Act 1950	Section 22(2).
14 Geo. 6. c. 33	Air Force Reserve Act 1950	Section 22(2).
1 & 2 Eliz. 2. c. 50	Auxiliary Forces Act 1953	In section 2(1), the words "area consisting of one or more counties or any other", so far as unrepealed. In section 39(3), the words "An officer or man of the Territorial Army or the Royal Auxiliary Air Force shall not be compelled to serve as a peace officer or parish officer and". In section 43(1), the definition of "county". Schedule 3, so far as unrepealed.
1966 c. 30	Reserve Forces Act 1966	Section 14(4).

Part II — Consequential repeals
Citation	Short title	Extent of repeal
14 Chas. 2. c. 3	City of London Militia Act 1662	Section 1.
42 Geo. 3. c. 90	Militia Act 1802	The whole act.
42 Geo. 3. c. 91	Militia (Scotland) Act 1802	The whole act.
16 & 17 Vict. c. 73	Naval Volunteers Act 1853	The whole act.
22 & 23 Vict. c. 40	Royal Naval Reserve (Volunteer) Act 1859	The whole act.
26 & 27 Vict. c. 69	Officers of Royal Naval Reserve Act 1863	The whole act.
34 & 35 Vict. c. 86	Regulation of the Forces Act 1871	The whole act.
35 & 36 Vict. c. 73	Merchant Shipping Act 1872	The whole act.
45 & 46 Vict. c. 12	Militia Storehouses Act 1882	The whole act.
45 & 46 Vict. c. 49	Militia Act 1882	The whole act.
47 & 48 Vict. c. 46	Naval Enlistment Act 1884	The whole act.
59 & 60 Vict. c. 33	Royal Naval Reserve Volunteer Act 1896	The whole act.
63 & 64 Vict. c. 52	Naval Reserve Act 1900	The whole act.
2 Edw. 7. c. 5	Royal Naval Reserve Act 1902	The whole act.
3 Edw. 7. c. 6	Naval Forces Act 1903	The whole act.
6 Edw. 7. c. 5	Seamen's and Soldiers' False Characters Act 1906	Section 3.
11 & 12 Geo. 5. c. 37	Territorial Army and Militia Act 1921	The whole act.
16 & 17 Geo. 5. c. 41	Naval Reserve (Officers) Act 1926	The whole act.
17 & 18 Geo. 5. c. 18	Royal Naval Reserve Act 1927	The whole act.
11 & 12 Geo. 6. c. 25	Royal Marines Act 1948	The whole act.
12, 13 & 14 Geo. 6. c. 8	Recall of Army and Air Force Pensioners Act 1948	The whole act.
12, 13 & 14 Geo. 6. c. 96	Auxiliary and Reserve Forces Act 1949	The whole act.
14 Geo. 6. c. 32	Army Reserve Act 1950	The whole act, so far as unrepealed.
14 Geo. 6. c. 33	Air Force Reserve Act 1950	The whole act, so far as unrepealed.
15 & 16 Geo. 6 & 1 Eliz. 2. c. 8	Home Guard Act 1951	In section 1(4), the words "and as to pensions and other grants in respect of death or disablement".
1 & 2 Eliz. 2. c. 50	Auxiliary Forces Act 1953	The whole act, so far as unrepealed.
3 & 4 Eliz. 2. c. 20	Revision of the Army and Air Force Acts (Transitional Provisions) Act 1955	In Schedule 2, paragraphs 11 to 14 and 18.
5 & 6 Eliz. 2. c. 32	Naval and Marine Reserves Pay Act 1957	The whole act.
9 & 10 Eliz. 2. c. 52	Army and Air Force Act 1961	In Schedule 2, the entries relating to the Recall of Army and Air Force Pensioners Act 1948, the Army Reserve Act 1950, and the Air Force Reserve Act 1950.
10 & 11 Eliz. 2. c. 10	Army Reserve Act 1962	The whole act.
1964 c. 11	Navy, Army and Air Force Reserves Act 1964	The whole act.
1964 c. 42	Administration of Justice Act 1964	Section 18(1) and (2).
1966 c. 30	Reserve Forces Act 1966	The whole act, so far as unrepealed.
1966 c. 45	Armed Forces Act 1966	In Schedule 4, the entries relating to the Seamen's and Soldiers' False Characters Act 1906, the Recall of Army and Air Force Pensioners Act 1948, the Auxiliary and Reserve Forces Act 1949, the Army Reserve Act 1950, the Air Force Reserve Act 1950, and the Navy, Army and Air Force Reserves Act 1964.
1967 c. 80	Criminal Justice Act 1967	In Schedule 3, Parts I and IV, the entries relating to the Army Reserve Act 1950, the Air Force Reserve Act 1950, and the Auxiliary Forces Act 1953.
1969 c. 65	Ulster Defence Regiment Act 1969	The whole act.
1971 c. 33	Armed Forces Act 1971	Section 64(2). Section 69(1) and (2). In section 76, the words from "in section 21 of the Army Reserve Act 1950" to end. In Schedule 3, paragraph 6.
1972 c. 70	Local Government Act 1972	Section 218.
1973 c. 34	Ulster Defence Regiment Act 1973	The whole act.
1973 c. 65	Local Government (Scotland) Act 1973	Section 205. In Schedule 27, Part II, paragraphs 114 and 163.
1977 c. 18	Statute Law (Repeals) Act 1977	In Schedule 2, the entry relating to the Army Reserve Act 1962.
1977 c. 49	National Health Service Act 1977	In Schedule 14, in paragraph 13(1)(b), the reference to paragraph 49 of Schedule 4 to the National Health Service Reorganisation Act 1973.
1978 c. 29	National Health Service (Scotland) Act 1978	In Schedule 15, in paragraph 10(c), the reference to paragraph 49 of Schedule 4 to the National Health Service Reorganisation Act 1973.

== Subsequent developments ==
Most of the act was repealed by section 131(2) of, and schedule 11 to, the Reserve Forces Act 1996 (c. 14), which came into force on 1 April 1997. The sections remaining in force are sections 48, 55, 130 to 138, 140, 151, and 156 to 158.
