= Robert Steele (MP) =

British politicisn

Robert Steele (c. 24 February 1757 – 10 July 1817) was a British politician and judge who served as MP for Weobley.

== Early life ==
Steele was baptised on 24 February 1757. He was a younger son of Thomas Steele of Westhampnett, Recorder of Chichester, and the former Elizabeth Madgwick of Cuckfield. His elder brother was Thomas Steele, MP for Chichester.

He was educated at Westminster School.

== Career ==
He succeeded his father as Recorder of Chichester from 1787 until his death. He was also second justice of North Wales circuit from 1801 to 1805, and a master in Chancery 1805 until his death.

Steele was returned for Weobley, on the interest of the 2nd Marquess of Bath, in 1802. Like his brother, he retired from Parliament in 1807.

== Personal life ==
Steele, who never married, died on 10 July 1817.

Parliament of the United Kingdom
Preceded by Lord George Thynne; Sir Charles Talbot, Bt	Member of Parliament for Weobley; 1802–1807; With: Lord George Thynne	Succeeded by Lord George Thynne; Lord Guernsey
