= Militia (Ireland) Act 1809 =

Act of the Parliament of the United Kingdom

Militia (Ireland) Act 1809 (Note: The citation of this act by this short title was authorised by section 1 of, and the first schedule to, the Short Titles Act 1896. Due to the repeal of those provisions it is now authorised by section 19(2) of the Interpretation Act 1978.)
- Act of Parliament
- Parliament of the United Kingdom
- Long title: An Act for amending and reducing into One Act of Parliament the several Laws for raising and training the Militia of Ireland.
- Citation: 49 Geo. 3. c. 120
- Territorial extent: United Kingdom

Dates
- Royal assent: 19 June 1809
- Commencement: 19 July 1809 (Note: Section 149.)
- Repealed: 6 March 1975
Other legislation
Repeals/revokes	See § Repealed enactments
Amended by	Militia (Ireland) Act 1814; Statute Law Revision Act 1872 (No. 2); Statute Law Revision Act 1873; Militia (Voluntary Enlistment) Act 1875; Statute Law Revision Act 1888; Territorial Army and Militia Act 1921; Northern Ireland (Lieutenancy) Order 1975
Repealed by	Northern Ireland (Lieutenancy) Order 1975
Relates to	Militia (Ireland) Act 1802

Status: Repealed

Text of statute as originally enacted

The Militia (Ireland) Act 1809 (49 Geo. 3. c. 120) was an act of the Parliament of the United Kingdom that consolidated enactments related to the militia in Ireland.

== Repealed enactments ==
Section 1 of the act repealed 9 enactments, listed in that section. The repeal did not affect the operation of any of the repealed acts so far as they repealed a former act or acts of Parliament, any proceeding for the punishment of an offence committed against any of the repealed acts before the commencement of this act, or the validity of any commission, deputation, appointment or enrolment of an officer, non-commissioned officer, drummer or private made under the repealed acts, all of which continued in full force and effect, with every person so commissioned or enrolled continuing to serve in the militia, as if this act had not been passed.

Citation	Short title	Description	Extent of repeal
33 Geo. 3. c. 22 (I)	Militia Act (Ireland) 1793	An Act for amending and reducing into one Act of Parliament, the Laws relating to the Militia in Ireland.	The whole act.
35 Geo. 3. c. 8 (I)	Militia (No. 2) Act (Ireland) 1795	An Act to explain and amend an Act, passed in the Thirty-third Year of the Reign of His present Majesty, entitled, "An Act for amending and reducing into one Act of Parliament, the Laws relating to the Militia of Ireland."	The whole act.
36 Geo. 3. c. 33 (I)	Militia (No. 2) Act (Ireland) 1796	An Act to further explain and amend an act passed in the 33rd year of his majesty's reign, entitled, "An Act for amending and reducing into one act of parliament the laws relating to the militia of Ireland," and also an act passed in the 35th year of his majesty's reign, entitled, "An Act to explain and amend an act passed in the 33rd year of his majesty's reign."	The whole act.
37 Geo. 3. c. 19 (I)	Militia (No. 2) Act (Ireland) 1797	An Act to explain and amend the laws now in force relating to the militia of this kingdom.	The whole act.
38 Geo. 3. c. 62 (I)	Militia (No. 2) Act (Ireland) 1798	An Act to further explain and amend the laws now in force relating to the militia of this kingdom.	The whole act.
40 Geo. 3. c. 1 (I)	Militia Act (Ireland) 1800	An Act for enabling his Majesty to accept the Services of Volunteers from the Militia under certain Restrictions, and for amending the Law relative to the Militia of Ireland.	So much as remained in force immediately before the passing of this act.
40 Geo. 3. c. 92 (I)	Militia (No. 3) Act (Ireland) 1800	An Act for amending an Act passed in this Kingdom in the Thirty-third Year of his Majesty's Reign, entitled, "An Act for amending and reducing into one Act of Parliament, the Laws relating to the Militia in Ireland."	The whole act.
41 Geo. 3. c. 6	Militia (Ireland) Act 1801	An Act for increasing the number of field officers of the several regiments of militia in Ireland.	The whole act.
42 Geo. 3. c. 109	Militia (Ireland) (No. 1) Act 1802	An Act for authorizing and rendering valid the Discharge of certain Militia Men in Ireland, and for giving Indemnity to the several Counties and Places in Ireland, which may incur any Expence in consequence of the Discharge of certain Militia Men.	The whole act, except so much as relates to militia men discharged before the passing of this act.

== Subsequent developments ==
The whole act, except so much of section 74 as prescribed the appointment of clerks to general meetings, was repealed by section 4 of, and the second schedule to, the Territorial Army and Militia Act 1921 (11 & 12 Geo. 5. c. 37), which came into operation on 1 October 1921.

The surviving part of section 74 was repealed for Northern Ireland by article 7(2) of, and the schedule to, the Northern Ireland (Lieutenancy) Order 1975 (SI 1975/156), which came into force on 6 March 1975.
