= City of London Militia Act 1662 =

Act of the Parliament of England

City of London Militia Act 1662 (Note: The citation of this act by this short title was authorised by section 5 of, and the second schedule to, the Statute Law Revision Act 1948. Due to the repeal of those provisions, it is now authorised by section 19(2) of the Interpretation Act 1978.)
- Act of Parliament
- Parliament of England
- Long title: An Act for ordering the Forces in the several Counties of this Kingdom. (Note: These words are printed against this act in the second column of the second schedule to the Statute Law Revision Act 1948, which is headed "Title".)
- Citation: 14 Cha. 2. c. 3 (Note: This is the citation in The Statutes of the Realm.); 13 & 14 Cha. 2. c. 3 (Note: This is the citation in The Statutes at Large.)
- Territorial extent: England and Wales

Dates
- Royal assent: 19 May 1662
- Commencement: 7 January 1662 (Note: Start of session.)
Other legislation
Amended by	City of London Militia Act 1794; Statute Law Revision Act 1863; Statute Law Revision Act 1888; Territorial Army and Militia Act 1921; Reserve Forces Act 1980

Status: Amended

History of passage through Parliament

Text of statute as originally enacted

Revised text of statute as amended

Text of the City of London Militia Act 1662 as in force today (including any amendments) within the United Kingdom, from legislation.gov.uk.

The City of London Militia Act 1662 (14 Cha. 2. c. 3), also known as the Militia Act 1662 (Note: The informal name, used by early modern historians, is usually "Militia Act of 1662";), is an act of the Parliament of England which codified the power of [lord-]lieutenants of places in England and Wales to raise the militia. In practice, most lieutenancy areas were counties, but the 1662 act made exemptions for the Constable of the Tower and Lord Warden of the Cinque Ports to act as lieutenants within their jurisdictions (the Tower Hamlets and Confederation of Cinque Ports respectively).

== Subsequent development ==
Most provisions of the act were implicitly repealed by subsequent Militia Acts.

Sections 19, 22, and 23 of the act, and the whole of the act except so far as it relates to the respective Militias of the City of London, Tower Hamlets and the Cinque Ports, were repealed by section 1 of, and the schedule to, the Statute Law Revision Act 1863 (26 & 27 Vict. c. 125), which came into force on 28 July 1863.

The whole act, except so much of section 1 "as confers power on His Majesty to issue forth commissions of lieutenancy in respect of the City of London", and so much of section 26 "as provides for the imposition and levying of a rate in the City of London", was repealed by section 4 of, and the second schedule to, the Territorial Army and Militia Act 1921 (11 & 12 Geo. 5. c. 37), which came into force on 1 October 1921.

The restricted scope of its remaining provisions was reflected in the official short title City of London Militia Act 1662 assigned in 1948.

Section 1 of the act was repealed by section 157(1)(b) of, and part II of schedule 10 to, the Reserve Forces Act 1980, which came into force on 20 April 1980.

as of 2025, section 26 as amended remains in force in England and Wales.
