= Militia (Great Britain) =

Military reserve force of Great Britain during the 18th century

Militia Act 1757
- Act of Parliament
- Parliament of Great Britain
- Long title: An Act for the better Ordering of the Militia Forces, in the several Counties of that Part of Great Britain called England.
- Citation: 30 Geo. 2. c. 25
- Territorial extent: Great Britain

Dates
- Royal assent: 28 June 1757
- Commencement: 1 May 1757 (Note: Section 1.)
- Expired: 28 June 1762 (Note: Section 73.)
- Repealed: 15 July 1867
Other legislation
| Repealed by | Statute Law Revision Act 1867 |

Status: Repealed

Text of statute as originally enacted

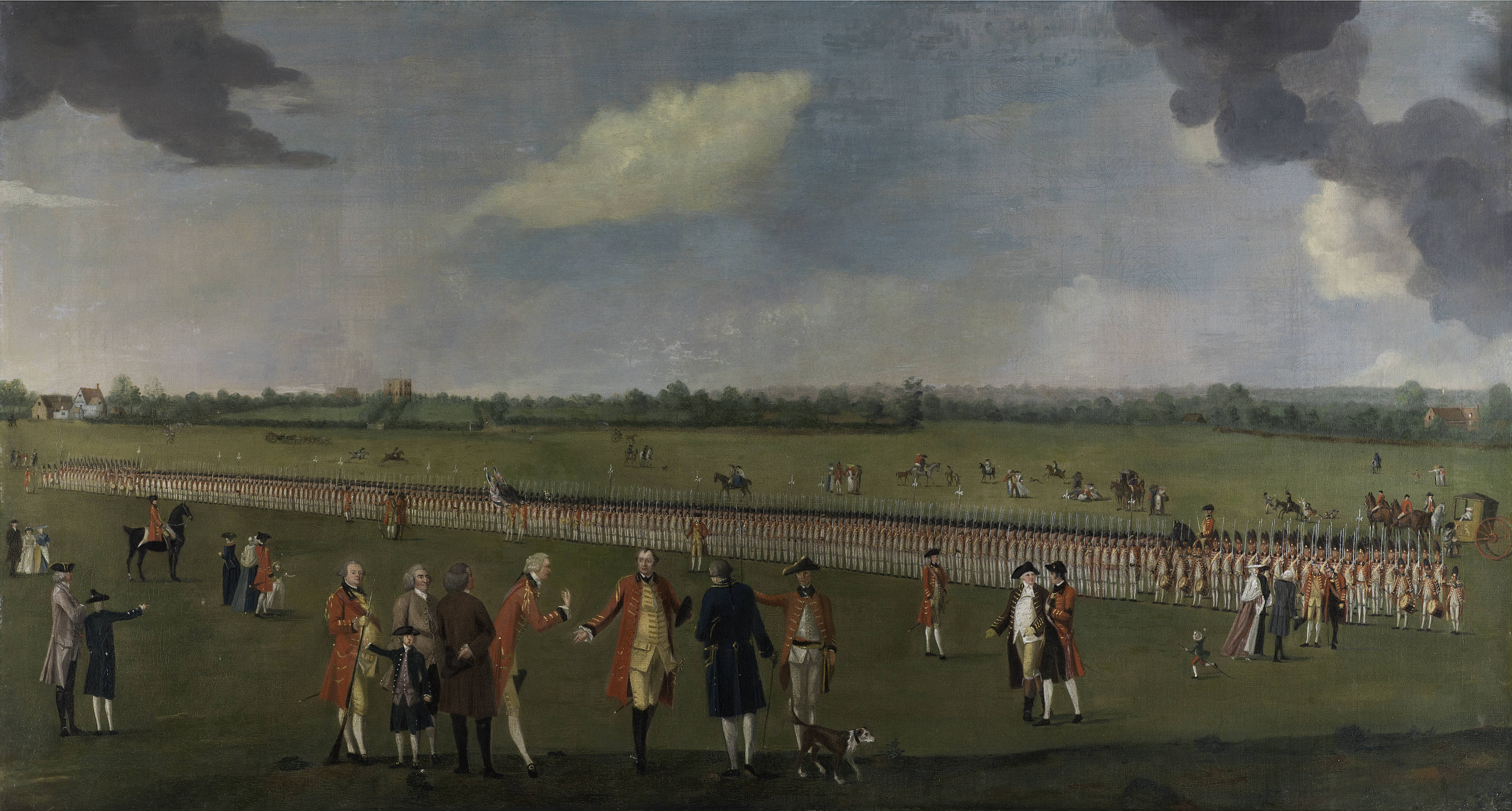
c. 1759–1763 painting of the Norfolk Militia being reviewed

The British Militia was the principal military reserve force of the Kingdom of Great Britain. Militia units were repeatedly raised in Great Britain during the Georgian era for internal security duties and to defend against external invasions. The Militia Act 1757 (30 Geo. 2. c. 25), passed by the Parliament of Great Britain after the outbreak of the Seven Years' War, led to the rapid expansion of the British Militia in order to defend against potential French invasions. In the Kingdom of Ireland, a client state of Great Britain, the equivalent force was the Irish Militia, which saw heavy service in the Irish Rebellion of 1798 alongside British militia units. The existence of militia units in Great Britain and Ireland played an important role in freeing regular troops from the British and Irish establishments for overseas service.

== Background ==
Following the restoration of Charles II in 1660, Parliament passed several acts empowering the lord-lieutenant of each county to appoint officers and raise men for the English Militia. Although the king commanded the forces, they were not centrally funded. The burden of supplying men and equipment fell on property owners, in proportion to their income from land or their property value. The militia could be called out for local police actions, to keep the peace, and in the event of a national emergency. It played a role in coastal defence during the second and third Anglo-Dutch Wars between 1665 and 1674, and contributed to the defeat of the Duke of Monmouth in 1685.

== Great Britain ==
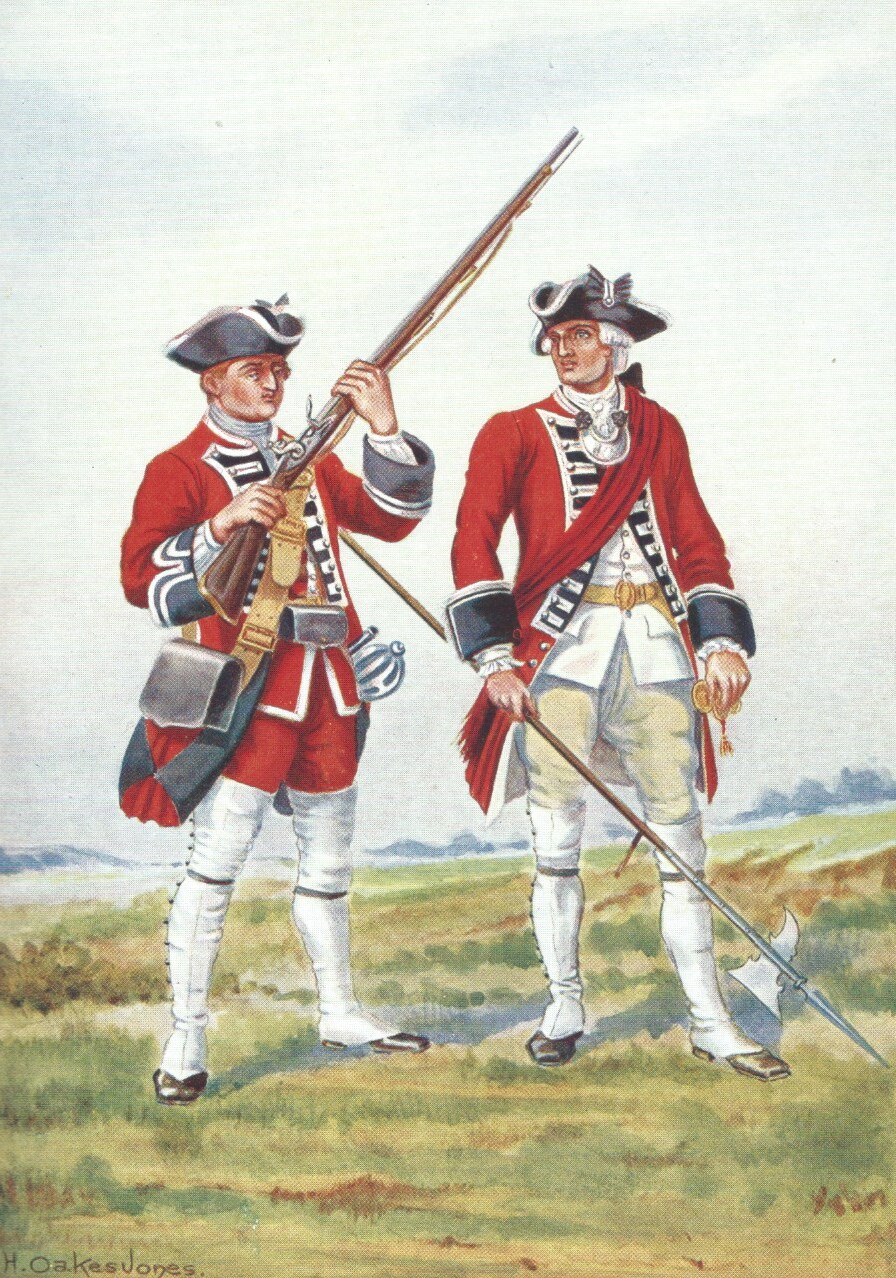
A private and sergeant of the Somerset Militia in 1759

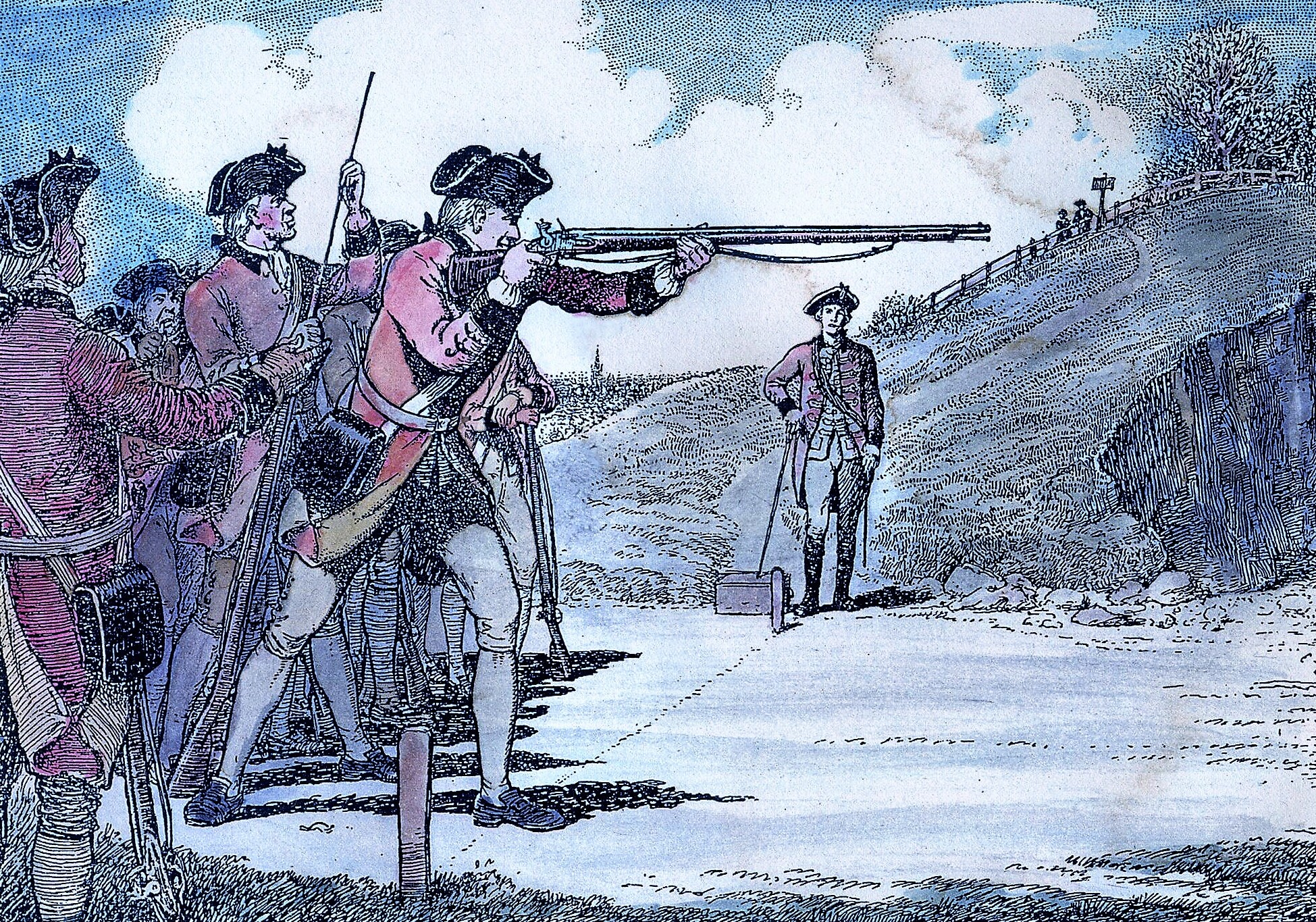
The Norfolk Militia undergoing musket training in 1759

The militia's usefulness as a military force, never great, declined thereafter, until by the middle of the 18th century it required a major overhaul. This was achieved by the Militia Acts 1757–1762, passed as a response to the threat of a French invasion during the Seven Years' War. The Militia Act 1762 (2 Geo. 3. c. 20) was passed to consolidate those acts and increase the effectiveness of the militia. Responsibility for raising and organising the force remained at county level, but funding was provided by central government. Officers were to be appointed from among the property-owning class. Men were to be chosen by ballot among the able-bodied men of the parish between the ages of 18 and 50, and would serve for three years (soon extended to five). If they wished not to serve, they could either provide a substitute or pay a £10 fine.

There was considerable opposition to the reforms, both in Parliament and in the country at large. Riots occurred in Yorkshire, Lincolnshire and elsewhere in 1757. These stemmed chiefly from an ill-informed fear that conscription and compulsory foreign service were being covertly introduced. In fact, the acts, which applied in England and Wales only, restricted service to the territory of Great Britain. However some militia regiments did volunteer for service in Ireland during the Rebellion of 1798. Local opposition to the acts resulted in some counties being slow to implement them. Six counties – Derbyshire, Nottinghamshire, Oxfordshire, Staffordshire, Sussex and Worcestershire – were in default for many years, also defaulting on a large part of the fines imposed on them in consequence. The American Revolution, which drained the country of regular troops, provided the stimulus that brought the defaulters into line. By 1778 all English and Welsh counties had embodied their militias.

Training of the disembodied militia took place over a period of several weeks each year, outside which officers and men would be largely free to pursue their civilian lives. When embodied, regiments would normally be quartered in public houses or barracks where available. Camps were also an option, and these were often sizeable affairs which brought troops together in large numbers for strategic and training purposes. Although overseas service was excluded from the militia's duties, embodied regiments were usually required to serve away from their home counties, and were frequently moved from one station to another. This was intended to reduce the risk of the men sympathising with the populace if they were required to quell civil unrest. Pay and conditions were similar to those of the regular army, with the additional benefit of money for family dependants. Unlike the army, the militia had no cavalry or, until 1853, artillery.

The militia was constitutionally separate from the army, but from the 1790s militiamen were encouraged to volunteer for the army, and did so in large numbers. During the French Revolutionary Wars the militia expanded to a total strength of 82,000 men in February 1799, reducing to 66,000 through the Militia (No. 4) Act 1799 (39 Geo. 3. c. 106), which was designed to reinforce the regular army by encouraging militia volunteers through the offer of bounties for enlistment. In 1802 peace with France led to the disembodying of the militia, which was embodied again in 1803, when hostilities resumed.

The Relief of Families of Militiamen Act 1803 (43 Geo. 3. c. 47) consolidated and amended enactments relating to the militia, in recognition of the hardship militiamen's families could be placed in when they were balloted.

Britain's increasing overseas troop commitments during the Napoleonic Wars resulted in growing pressure on recruitment for the militia, both for home defence and as a feeder for the army. During the period to 1815, 110,000 men transferred to line regiments as against 36,000 prior to 1802. The militia continued to serve as a coastal defence force, as well as guarding dockyards and prisoners of war, and performing other duties including riot control during the Luddite unrest of 1811–1813. It was disembodied in 1815 but balloting continued until 1831.

=== List of militia regiments ===
An incomplete list includes:

- Anglesey Militia
- Bedfordshire Militia
- Berkshire Militia
- Brecknockshire Militia
- Buckinghamshire Militia
- Cambridgeshire Militia
- Cardiganshire Militia
- Carmarthenshire Militia
- Carnarvon Militia
- Denbigh Militia
- Derbyshire Militia
- Devon Militia (four regiments)
- Dorset Militia
- Durham Militia (two regiments)
- Flintshire Militia
- Glamorgan Militia
- Gloucestershire Militia (two regiments)
- Hampshire Militia (two regiments)
- Herefordshire Militia
- Hertfordshire Militia
- Huntingdonshire Militia
- Isle of Wight Militia
- Kent Militia (two regiments)
- Royal Lancashire Militia (seven regiments)
- Leicestershire
- Royal London Militia (two regiments)
- Middlesex Militia (five regiments)
- Royal Montgomeryshire Militia
- Norfolk Militia (two regiments)
- Northampton Militia
- Northampton and Rutland Militia
- Northumberland Militia
- Nottinghamshire Militia
- Oxfordshire Militia
- Radnorshire Militia
- Rutland Militia
- Somerset Militia (two regiments)
- Suffolk Militia (two regiments)
- Royal Surrey Militia (three regiments)
- Sussex Militia
- Royal Wiltshire Militia
- Warwickshire Militia
- Worcestershire Militia
- East York Militia
- North York Militia

== Scottish Militia ==
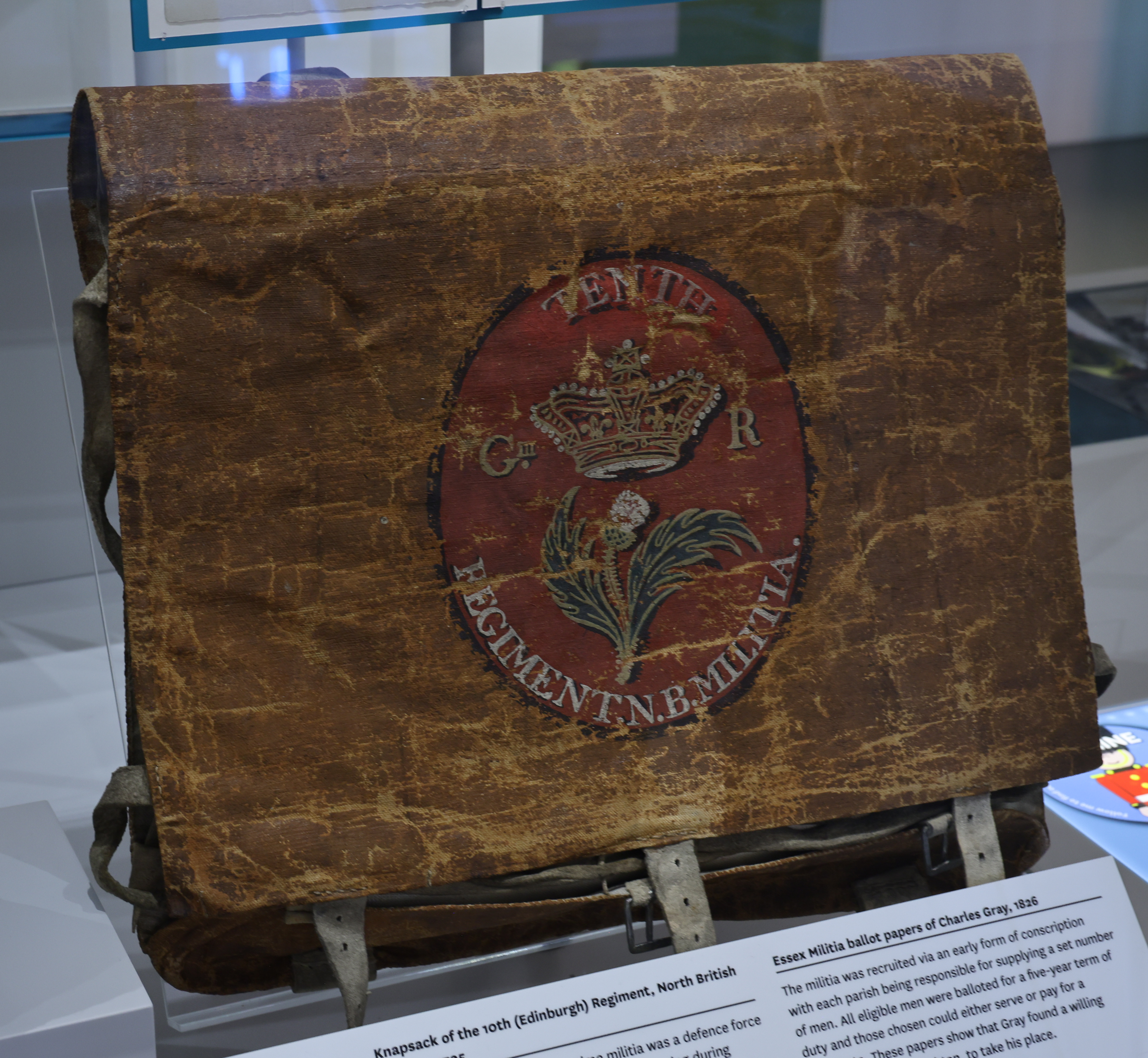
A knapsack of the 10th North British Militia

In the late 17th century, while the Kingdom of Scotland was still an independent country sharing a monarch with England, there were calls for the resurrection of the country's militia, with the understated aim of protecting the rights of Scots in Great Britain. A historical account of the debate which followed on Fletcher's work is given in John Robertson's 1985 The Scottish Enlightenment and the Militia Issue.

During the Jacobite rising of 1745 in Scotland, militias were raised in Argyll, the Isle of Skye and the northern counties. They are often confused with Loudon's Highlanders regiment and the Independent Highland Companies who also supported the Government. The Campbell of Argyll Militia also known as the Campbell militia, the Argyll militia, or the Argyllshire men, was an irregular militia unit formed in 1745 by John Campbell, 4th Duke of Argyll to oppose the rising.

Following the merger of Scotland into the new Kingdom of Great Britain, the British Militia Act 1757 did not apply in Scotland. There the traditional system continued, so that militia regiments existed in some places and not in others. This was resented by some, and the Militia Club, soon to become the Poker Club, was formed in Edinburgh to promote the raising of a Scottish militia. This and several other Edinburgh clubs became the crucible of the Scottish Enlightenment.

The Militia Act 1797 empowered the Lord Lieutenants of Scotland to raise and command militia regiments in each of the "Counties, Stewartries, Cities, and Places" under their jurisdiction. At first the act was opposed due to some believing the militia ballot would be used to enable the Crown to remove men from Scotland.

=== List of militia regiments ===
Ten regiments of 'North British Militia' were raised in April 1798 under the 1797 Act:

- 1st (Argyllshire)
- 2nd (Ross-shire)
- 3rd (Lanarkshire)
- 4th (Dumfrieshire)
- 5th (Fifeshire)
- 6th (Aberdeenshire)
- 7th (Ayrshire)
- 8th (Forfarshire)
- 9th (Perthshire)
- 10th (Edinburgh)

These regiments were disbanded in 1802 after the Peace of Amiens, but new regiments (several of them continuations of the original 10) were raised the same year under the Militia (Scotland) Act 1802. When these were embodied in 1803 they were assigned precedence numbers by lot in the same sequence as the English and Welsh militia regiments. From then on they form part of the history of the United Kingdom Militia.

== Irish Militia ==
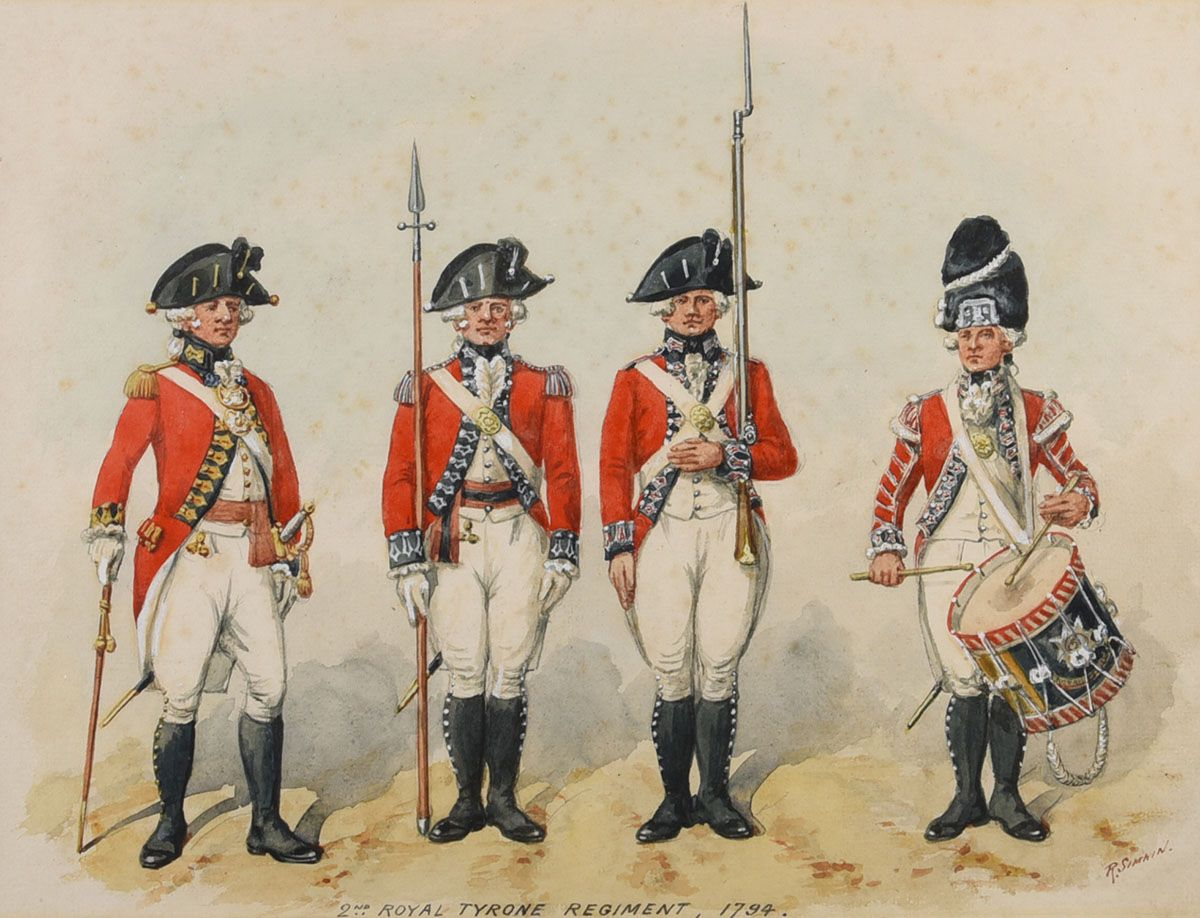
Lieutenant, sergeant, private and drummer of the Royal Tyrone Militia in 1794

The earliest history of the militia in Ireland dates to the Cromwellian period with the raising of two regiments of militia in Dublin in May 1659. In 1666 during the Second Anglo-Dutch War the establishment of a national militia was begun. This started as a proposal from Roger Boyle, 1st Earl of Orrery to James Butler, 1st Duke of Ormond the then Lord Lieutenant of Ireland. Orrey was Lord President of Munster and the establishment of militia was the most advanced there, this was partially driven by fears of a Dutch attack on Kinsale. Ormonde however in general wasn't hugely enthusiastic about the militia given the large number of Cromwellian settlers within it. As a result the militia was established on an ad-hoc basis and was only called out three times during the period in 1666, 1672 (renewal of war with Dutch) and 1678 (Popish Plot – where they were used to disarm the Catholic population). It would subsequently be disarmed itself however in 1685 during the Monmouth Rebellion by Richard Talbot, 1st Earl of Tyrconnell.

Militia Act (Ireland) 1715
- Act of Parliament
- Parliament of Ireland
- Long title: An Act to make the Militia of this Kingdom more useful.
- Citation: 2 Geo. 1. c. 9 (I)

Dates
- Royal assent: 20 June 1716
Other legislation
| Repealed by | Statute Law Revision (Ireland) Act 1879 |

Status: Repealed

Militia Act (Ireland) 1793
- Act of Parliament
- Parliament of Ireland
- Long title: An Act for amending and reducing into one Act of Parliament, the Laws relating to the Militia in Ireland.
- Citation: 33 Geo. 3. c. 22 (I)
- Territorial extent: Ireland

Dates
- Royal assent: 9 April 1793
- Repealed: 19 June 1809
Other legislation
| Repealed by | Militia (Ireland) Act 1809 |

Status: Repealed

As a result of the ad-hoc nature of its formation the legal position of the pre-existing Militia in Ireland was only finally formalised when the Parliament of Ireland passed an act, the Militia Act (Ireland) 1715 (2 Geo. 1. c. 9 (I)), in 1716 raising regiments of militia in each county and county corporate. Membership was restricted to Protestants between the ages of sixteen and sixty. In 1793, during the Napoleonic Wars, the Irish militia were reorganized by the Militia Act (Ireland) 1793 (33 Geo. 3. c. 22 (I)) to form thirty-eight county and city regiments. While officers of the reorganized force were all Protestants, membership of the other ranks was now opened up to members of all denominations, including Roman Catholics. The provisions of the act called for lists to be drawn up of eligible men in each locality and with enlistees been drawn by ballot. The result of this was to cause widespread discontent in Ireland resulting in riots and close to 230 deaths over an eight week period.

=== List of militia regiments ===
This is a list of militia regiments as raised after the passing of the Militia Act (Ireland) 1793. The regimental numbers were assigned by ballot on 8 August 1794. The four smaller counties corporate (towns of Carrickfergus and Galway, cities of Kilkenny and Waterford) were part of the adjoining county-at-large for militia purposes.

- 1st Monaghan Regiment
- 2nd Tyrone Regiment
- 3rd Mayo North Battalion
- 4th Kildare Battalion
- 5th Louth Battalion
- 6th Westmeath Battalion
- 7th Antrim Regiment
- 8th Armagh Regiment
- 9th Down Regiment
- 10th Leitrim Battalion
- 11th Galway Regiment
- 12th Dublin City Regiment
- 13th Limerick City Battalion
- 14th Kerry Regiment
- 15th Longford Battalion
- 16th Londonderry Regiment
- 17th Meath Regiment
- 18th Cavan Battalion
- 19th King’s County Regiment
- 20th Kilkenny Regiment
- 21st Limerick County Regiment
- 22nd Sligo Battalion
- 23rd Carlow Battalion
- 24th Drogheda Battalion
- 25th Queen’s County Battalion
- 26th Clare Battalion
- 27th Cork City Regiment
- 28th Tipperary Regiment
- 29th Fermanagh Battalion
- 30th Mayo South Battalion
- 31st Roscommon Regiment
- 32nd Cork South Regiment
- 33rd Waterford Regiment
- 34th Cork North Regiment
- 35th Dublin County Battalion
- 36th Donegal Regiment
- 37th Wicklow Battalion
- 38th Wexford Regiment

== Channel Islands ==
- Royal Alderney Militia
- Royal Guernsey Militia
- Royal Militia of the Island of Jersey
- Royal Sark Militia

== See also ==
- Fencibles
- British Volunteer Corps
- Militia (British Dominions and Crown Colonies)
- Militia (United Kingdom)
- Yeomanry Cavalry
