= Militia (United Kingdom) =

Principle military reserve force of the United Kingdom of Great Britain and Ireland

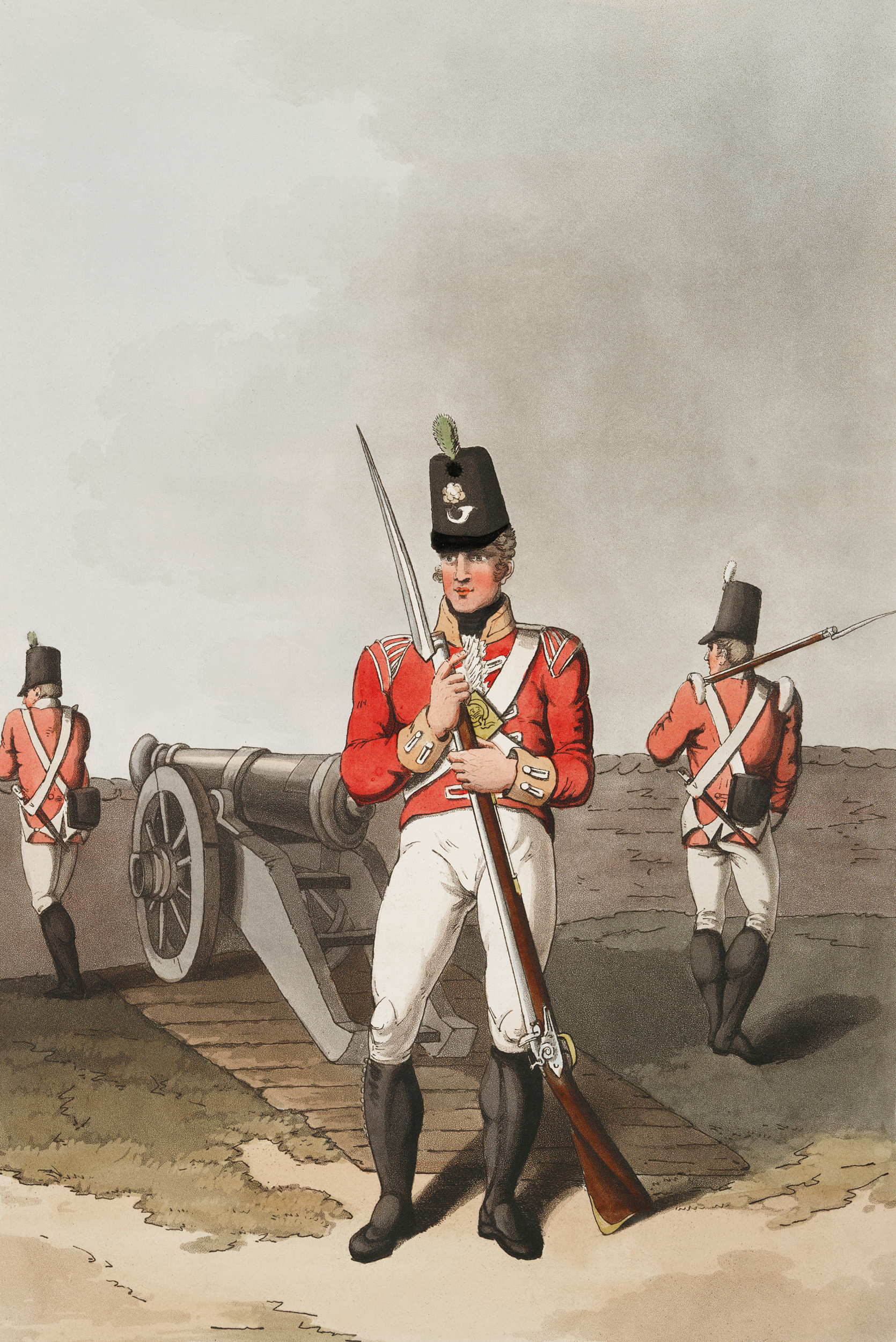
1814 engraving of troops of the East York Militia

The British Militia was the principal military reserve force of the United Kingdom of Great Britain and Ireland. Militia units were repeatedly raised in Great Britain during the Victorian and Edwardian eras for internal security duties and to defend against external invasions. The British Militia was transformed into the Special Reserve under the Territorial and Reserve Forces Act 1907 (7 Edw. 7. c. 9), which integrated all militia formations into the British Army.

== 19th century ==
A separate voluntary Local Militia was created in 1808 before being disbanded in 1816.

By 1813 the British Army was experiencing a shortage of manpower to maintain their battalions at full strength. Some consideration was given to recruiting foreign nationals; however, on 4 November 1813 a bill was introduced to Parliament to allow Militia volunteers to serve in Europe. In the event only three battalions were raised, and these were sent to serve under Henry Bayly. On 12 April 1814 they arrived in Bordeaux, where they were attached to the 7th Division.

After the Napoleonic Wars, the Militia fell into disuse, although regimental colonels and adjutants continued to appear in the Army List. Whilst muster rolls were still prepared during the 1820s, the element of compulsion was abandoned. For example, the City of York Militia & Muster Rolls run to 1829. They used a pre-printed form with a printer's date of Sept 1828.

The Militia was revived by the Militia Act 1852 (15 & 16 Vict. c. 50), enacted during a period of international tension. As before, units were raised and administered on a county basis, and filled by voluntary enlistment (although conscription by means of the militia ballot might be used if the counties failed to meet their quotas). It was intended to be seen as an alternative to the army. Training was for 56 days on enlistment, then the recruits would return to civilian life but report for 21–28 days training per year. The full army pay during training and a financial retainer thereafter made a useful addition to the men's civilian wage. Of course, many saw the annual camp as the equivalent of a paid holiday. The militia thus appealed to agricultural labourers, colliers and the like, men in casual occupations, who could leave their civilian job and pick it up again. The militia was also a significant source of recruits for the Regular Army, where men had received a taste of army life. An officer's commission in the militia was often a 'back door' route to a Regular Army commission for young men who could not obtain one through purchase or gain entry to Sandhurst.

Under the act, Militia units could be embodied by Royal Proclamation for full-time service in three circumstances:

1. 'Whenever a state of war exists between Her Majesty and any foreign power'.
2. 'In all cases of invasion or upon imminent danger thereof'.
3. 'In all cases of rebellion or insurrection'.

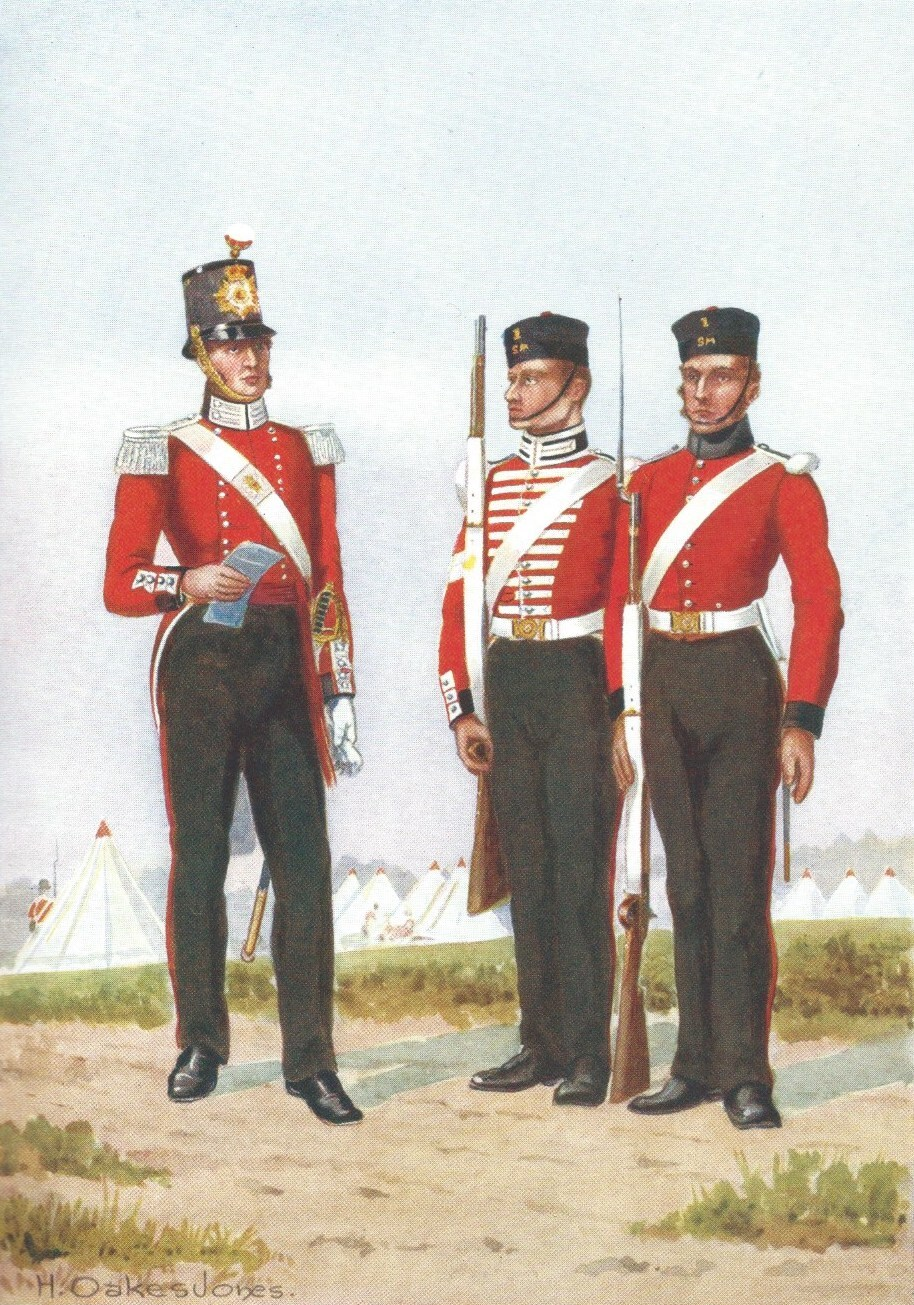
A captain, corporal and private of the Somerset Militia in 1854

Until 1852 the militia were an entirely infantry force, but the Militia Act 1852 introduced Militia Artillery units whose role was to man coastal defences and fortifications, relieving the Royal Artillery for active service. Some of these units were converted from existing infantry militia regiments, others were newly raised. In 1877 the militia of Anglesey and Monmouthshire were converted to Royal Engineers units.

Up to 1855, the Home Office administered the Militia and Yeomanry, until such time as they were 'embodied'. The resultant 'confusion and inconvenience' it caused, from 1854 to 1855, resulted in being administered exclusively by the War Office from that time onwards.

Under the reforms introduced by Secretary of State for War Hugh Childers in 1881, the remaining militia infantry regiments were redesignated as numbered battalions of regiments of the line, ranking after the two regular battalions. Typically, an English, Welsh or Scottish regiment would have two militia battalions (the 3rd and 4th) and Irish regiments three (numbered 3rd – 5th).

The militia must not be confused with the volunteer units created in a wave of enthusiasm in the second half of the nineteenth century. In contrast with the Volunteer Force, and the similar Yeomanry Cavalry, they were considered rather plebeian. Volunteer units appealed to better-off recruits as, unlike the Militia which engaged a recruit for a term of service, a volunteer could quit his corps with fourteen days notice, except while embodied for war or training with the regular forces. Volunteer Corps required recruits to fund their own equipment, however, effectively barring those with low incomes.

The Militia (Voluntary Enlistment) Act 1875 (38 & 39 Vict. c. 69) consolidated enactments related to the militia.

The Militia Act 1882 (45 & 46 Vict. c. 49) consolidated enactments related to the militia.

The special service section of the militia was formed by royal warrant, with the Reserve Forces and Militia Act 1898 (61 & 62 Vict. c. 9). It meant that militiamen voluntarily pledged to engage for special service overseas, in any corner of the globe. Up to 1900, the resultant low take-up of this special section was not satisfactory. Legislation passed in 1899 meant that militiamen could voluntarily serve in any corner of the globe. During 1899–1900, 22,000 militiamen were thus accepted for service abroad, the majority of whom proceeded to the theatre of war in South Africa, with others performing garrison duties.

== The Special Reserve ==
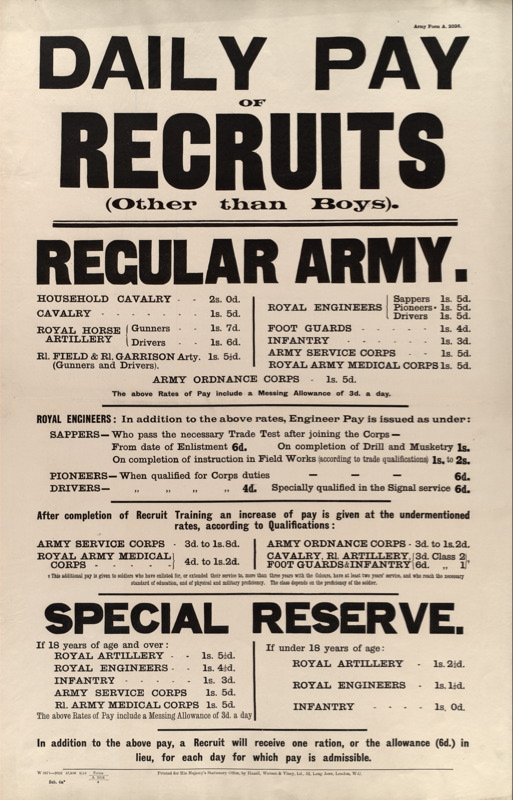
Recruitment poster for the Regular Army and Special Reserve

The militia was transformed into the Special Reserve by the military reforms of Haldane in the reforming post 1906 Liberal government. In 1908 the militia infantry battalions were redesignated as "reserve" and a number were amalgamated or disbanded. Altogether, 101 infantry battalions, 33 artillery regiments and two engineer regiments of special reservists were formed.

In contrast with the soldier serving in the militia, those who served under Special Reserve terms of service had an obligation to serve overseas, as stipulated in paragraph 54. The standards of medical fitness were lower than for recruits to the regular infantry. The possibility of enlisting in the army under Regular terms of service were facilitated under paragraph 38, one precondition was that the recruit 'fulfils the necessary physical requirements.'

A further contrast was the replacement of several weeks of preliminary training with six months of full time training upon enlisting in the Special Reserve.

Upon mobilisation, the special reserve units would be formed at the depot and continue training while guarding vulnerable points in Britain. The special reserve units remained in Britain throughout the First World War, but their rank and file did not, since the object of the special reserve was to supply drafts of replacements for the overseas units of the regiment.

The Special Reserve reverted to its militia designation in 1921, then to Supplementary Reserve in 1924, though the units were effectively placed in "suspended animation" until disbanded in 1953.

== The Militiamen ==
The term militiaman was briefly revived in 1939. In the aftermath of the Munich Crisis Leslie Hore-Belisha, Secretary of State for War, wished to introduce a limited form of conscription, an unheard of concept in peacetime. It was thought that calling the conscripts 'militiamen' would make this more acceptable, as it would render them distinct from the rest of the army. Only single men aged 20–22 were to be conscripted (given a free suit of civilian clothes as well as a uniform), and after six months full-time training would be discharged into the reserve. The first intake was called up, but the Second World War was declared soon afterwards, and the militiamen lost their identity in the rapidly expanding army.

== Modern survivals ==
Two units still maintain their militia designation in the British Army, in the Army Reserve. These are the Royal Monmouthshire Royal Engineers (formed in 1539) and the Jersey Field Squadron (The Royal Militia Island of Jersey) (formed in 1337).

== See also ==
- Lord-lieutenant
- Fencibles
- Home Guard (United Kingdom)

== Bibliography ==
- Bamford, Andrew (2013). Sickness, Suffering, and the Sword: The British Regiment on Campaign, 1808–1815. Norman, Oklahoma: University of Oklahoma Press. ISBN 978-0-80-618932-1.
- Dunlop, John K. (1938). The development of the British Army 1899–1914. London: Methuen.
- Langley, David (June 2014). "British Line Infantry Reserves for the Great War - Part 1". Stand To! (100). The Western Front Association: 23–27.
- Litchfield, Norman E.H. (1987). The Militia Artillery 1852–1909 (Their Lineage, Uniforms and Badges). Nottingham: Sherwood Press. ISBN 0-9508205-1-2.
- Spencer, William (1997). Records of the Militia & Volunteer Forces 1757-1945. Crawley: PRO Publications. ISBN 978-1-87-316244-6.
- Spiers, Edward M. (1980). The Army and Society 1815–1914. London: Longmans. ISBN 0-582-48565-7.
- Stoneman, Robert James (2014). The Reformed British Militia, c.1852-1908 (PDF) (PhD thesis). Thesis advisor: Dr Timothy Bowman. Canterbury: The School of History at the University of Kent.
- Chisholm, Hugh, ed. (1911). "Militia" . Encyclopædia Britannica. Vol. 18 (11th ed.). Cambridge University Press.
- "Scheme for the Special Reserve". War Office - Special Army Order. 23 December 1907. Archived from the original on 5 December 2023 – via Army Service Numbers. "Scanned images of the pages of this War Office publication costing two pence"
