= Reserve Forces Act 1937 =

Act of the Parliament of the United Kingdom

Reserve Forces Act 1937 (Note: Section 2.)
- Act of Parliament
- Parliament of the United Kingdom
- Long title: An Act to amend section one of the Reserve Forces and Militia Act, 1898, by extending the period of liability to be called out on permanent service thereunder.
- Citation: 1 Edw. 8. & 1 Geo. 6. c. 17
- Territorial extent: United Kingdom

Dates
- Royal assent: 19 March 1937
- Commencement: 19 March 1937 (Note: The Acts of Parliament (Commencement) Act 1793.)
- Repealed: 1 January 1951
Other legislation
Amends	Reserve Forces and Militia Act 1898
Repealed by	Auxiliary and Reserve Forces Act 1949; Army Reserve Act 1950

Status: Repealed

Text of statute as originally enacted

The Reserve Forces Act 1937 (1 Edw. 8. & 1 Geo. 6. c. 17) was an act of the Parliament of the United Kingdom. It allowed "Class A" British Army reservists to be called up for active service during their first five years after leaving the Army.

== Background ==
During the Army reforms of the late nineteenth century, section 12 of the Reserve Forces Act 1882 (45 & 46 Vict. c. 48) had provided for the Army Reserve to be called up by proclamation with the approval of Parliament. The Reserve Forces and Militia Act 1898 ( 61 & 62 Vict. c. 9) had then extended this to allow for up to five thousand men to be recalled for active service, by order in council, without requiring the approval of Parliament. The men were only liable for service if they agreed, and could only be recalled within their first year in the first class of the reserve - ie, up to one year after leaving regular service. They could only be recalled for service overseas, and could not be used inside the United Kingdom. This provision was then modified by section 31 of the Territorial and Reserve Forces Act 1907 (7 Edw. 7. c. 9), which extended the liability to two years in the first-class reserve and allowed up to six thousand men to be recalled. Men were able to cancel their liability with three months' notice.

This section of the first-class reserve was known as the "Class A Reserve", and those men who had volunteered to be liable for recall were paid sixpence a day in addition to the normal reservists' payments of a shilling per day. They provided a useful reserve to the Army, and were called up to provide extra manpower during the Shanghai crisis of 1927 and the Palestinian unrest of 1936. The Class A reserve was understrength, however, and was only able to recruit around half its nominal strength; this meant that when troops were called up for service in Palestine, every eligible infantryman was recalled leaving the War Office with little flexibility in case of other emergencies, other than a few hundred reservist artillerymen. The two-year period of eligibility was seen as a major cause of this limitation, and so the government planned to raise it to five years in order to allow more men to volunteer for Class A.

== Provisions ==
The 1937 act extended the period of liability to any point during the first five years in the first-class reserve, or the unexpired period of his original enlistment. However, this was still voluntary, and the reservist had to agree in writing to be liable.

== Subsequent developments ==
The whole act was repealed by section 29(1) of, and the third schedule to, the Army Reserve Act 1950 (14 Geo. 6. c. 32), and the Air Force Reserve Act 1950 (14 Geo. 6. c. 33), which came into force on 1 January 1951.
