= Reserve Forces Act 1900 =

Act of the Parliament of the United Kingdom

Reserve Forces Act 1900 (Note: Section 3.)
- Act of Parliament
- Parliament of the United Kingdom
- Long title: An Act to amend the Reserve Forces Act, 1882.
- Citation: 63 & 64 Vict. c. 42
- Territorial extent: United Kingdom

Dates
- Royal assent: 6 August 1900
- Commencement: 6 August 1900 (Note: The Acts of Parliament (Commencement) Act 1793.)
- Repealed: 1 January 1951
Other legislation
Amends	Reserve Forces Act 1882
Amended by	Territorial Army and Militia Act 1921
Repealed by	Army Reserve Act 1950

Status: Repealed

Text of statute as originally enacted

The Reserve Forces Act 1900 (63 & 64 Vict. c. 42) was an act of the Parliament of the United Kingdom, given royal assent on 6 August 1900 and fully repealed in 1950.

The act amended the Reserve Forces Act 1882 in two ways. Section 1 provided that it was henceforth permissible to call out the second division of the first class of the Army Reserve for active service, regardless of whether or not the first division had been called out. However, no man who had entered the second division before the Act was passed would be liable under this section, without their consent.

Section 2 modified section 10 subsection 4 of the 1882 Act, which dealt with the rank of a militia reservist on his return to the militia, and provided that:

- The militia rank of any man returned to the militia was not to be lower than that to which he was entitled to immediately before he was released from permanent service
- If, whilst on permanent service, his rank had been reduced below his militia rank, and he continued in the lower rank until released, then he would retain the lower rank on return to the militia.
- If he served in permanent service as a private, though entitled to a higher rank in the militia, and was given any punishment which would have reduced his rank had he been ranked above private, then his militia rank was to be reduced accordingly.
- If any alteration was made to the militia rank as a result of these provisions, his pay was to be adjusted accordingly.

Section 2 of the act was repealed by the Territorial Army and Militia Act 1921 (11 & 12 Geo. 5. c. 37), and the residue was repealed by section 29(1) of, and the third schedule to, the Army Reserve Act 1950 (14 Geo. 6. c. 32), and the Air Force Reserve Act 1950 (14 Geo. 6. c. 33), which came into force on 1 January 1951.
