= Reserve Forces Act 1899 =

Act of the Parliament of the United Kingdom

Reserve Forces Act 1899 (Note: Section 1.)
- Act of Parliament
- Parliament of the United Kingdom
- Long title: An Act to amend the Law relating to the Reserve Forces.
- Citation: 62 & 63 Vict. c. 40
- Territorial extent: United Kingdom

Dates
- Royal assent: 9 August 1899
- Commencement: 9 August 1899 (Note: The Acts of Parliament (Commencement) Act 1793.)
- Repealed: 1 January 1951
Other legislation
Amends	Reserves Forces Act 1882
Repealed by	Army Reserve Act 1950; Air Force Reserve Act 1950

Status: Repealed

Text of statute as originally enacted

The Reserve Forces Act 1899 (62 & 63 Vict. c. 40) was an act of the Parliament of the United Kingdom. It allowed reservists of the British Army to reside outside the United Kingdom, and to be discharged to the reserve without having to return home.

Under the Reserve Forces Act 1882 (45 & 46 Vict. c. 48), men served for a number of years as regular soldiers and then were discharged into the Army Reserve. The existing regulations stated that the Reserve existed only within the United Kingdom, and so men serving with units overseas were sent home in order to be discharged. This had been found to cause some occasional hardship, particularly when a soldier had personal ties to the area in which he was posted, and so the 1899 act allowed a reservist to reside outside the United Kingdom. The War Office was given the power to make regulations covering this situation, which was not expected to affect a substantial number of men. It was noted that, in any case, a number of commanding officers had tacitly given permission to this arrangement, and formalising it was beneficial to all parties.

The act was later extended by the Reserve Forces Act 1906 (6 Edw. 7. c. 11), which explicitly allowed reservists to reside in any British protectorate or colony except the self-governing Dominions, and allowed men resident in those territories to be directly recruited into the reserves.

== Subsequent developments ==
The whole act was repealed by section 29(1) of, and the third schedule to, the Army Reserve Act 1950 (14 Geo. 6. c. 32), and section 28(1) of, and part I of the third schedule to, the Air Force Reserve Act 1950 (14 Geo. 6. c. 33), which came into force on 1 January 1951.
