= Army Reserve Act 1950 =

Act of the Parliament of the United Kingdom

Army Reserve Act 1950 (Note: Section 30(1).)
- Act of Parliament
- Parliament of the United Kingdom
- Long title: An Act to consolidate certain enactments relating to the army reserve.
- Citation: 14 Geo. 6. c. 32
- Territorial extent: United Kingdom

Dates
- Royal assent: 26 October 1950
- Commencement: 1 January 1951 (Note: Section 30(2).)
- Repealed: 20 April 1980
Other legislation
Amends	See § Repealed enactments
Repeals/revokes	See § Repealed enactments
Repealed by	Statute Law Revision Act 1953; Revision of the Army and Air Force Acts (Transitional Provisions) Act 1955; Mental Health (Scotland) Act 1960; South Africa Act 1962; Armed Forces Act 1971; Northern Ireland (Modification of Enactments—No. 1) Order 1973; Statute Law (Repeals) Act 1975; Reserve Forces Act 1980
Relates to	Air Force Reserve Act 1950

Status: Repealed

Text of statute as originally enacted

The Army Reserve Act 1950 (14 Geo. 6. c. 32) was an act of the Parliament of the United Kingdom that consolidated enactments relating to the army reserve.

The Air Force Reserve Act 1950 (14 Geo. 6. c. 33) made similar provisions for the air force reserve.

== Provisions ==
=== Repealed enactments ===
Section 29(1) of the act repealed 11 enactments, listed in the third schedule to the act.

Citation	Short title	Extent of repeal
44 & 45 Vict. c. 58	Army Act 1881	In section eighty-eight, subsection (4); in section ninety-two, subsection (3).
45 & 46 Vict. c. 48	Reserve Forces Act 1882	The whole act, so far as still in force.
61 & 62 Vict. c. 9	Reserve Forces and Militia Act 1898	The whole act, so far as still in force.
62 & 63 Vict. c. 40	Reserve Forces Act 1899	The whole act.
63 & 64 Vict. c. 42	Reserve Forces Act 1900	The whole act, so far as still in force.
6 Edw. 7. c. 11	Reserve Forces Act 1906	The whole act.
7 Edw. 7. c. 9	Territorial and Reserve Forces Act 1907	Sections thirty to thirty-three and thirty-five, so much of sections thirty-eight to forty as relates to the army reserve, and in section forty-one the words from "and so far" to the end.
8 Edw. 7. c. 2	Army (Annual) Act 1908	Section four.
11 & 12 Geo. 5. c. 37	Territorial Army and Militia Act 1921	Section two.
1 Edw. 8 & 1 Geo. 6. c. 17	Reserve Forces Act 1937	The whole act.
12, 13 & 14 Geo. 6. c. 96	Auxiliary and Reserve Forces Act 1949	Sections twelve and thirteen; section seventeen so far as it relates to the army reserve; and in section eighteen, subsection (3).

== Subsequent developments ==
Section 25 of the act was repealed by section 1(1) of, and part XI of the schedule to, the Statute Law (Repeals) Act 1975, which came into force on 13 March 1975.

The whole act was repealed by section 157(1)(b) of, and part II of schedule 10 to, the Reserve Forces Act 1980 (c. 9), which came into force on 20 April 1980.
