= Army Act 1881 =

Act of the Parliament of the United Kingdom

Army Act 1881 (Note: Section 1.)
- Act of Parliament
- Parliament of the United Kingdom
- Long title: An Act to consolidate the Army Discipline and Regulation Act, 1879, and the subsequent Acts amending the same.
- Citation: 44 & 45 Vict. c. 58
- Territorial extent: United Kingdom; Channel Islands; Isle of Man; (Note: Section 187.)

Dates
- Royal assent: 27 August 1881
- Commencement: 27 September 1881 (United Kingdom, Channel Islands and Isle of Man) (Note: Section 191(1) of the act and section 52(a) of the Regulation of the Forces Act 1881.); 27 October 1881 (elsewhere in Europe, including Malta, and in the West Indies and America) (Note: Section 191(1) of the act and section 52(b) of the Regulation of the Forces Act 1881.); 27 February 1882 (elsewhere, within or without Her Majesty's dominions) (Note: Section 191(1) of the act and section 52(c) of the Regulation of the Forces Act 1881.)
- Repealed: 21 July 2008
Other legislation
Amends	See § Repealed enactments
Repeals/revokes	See § Repealed enactments
Amended by	Reserve Forces Act 1882; Criminal Lunatics Act 1884; Licensing (Scotland) Act 1903; Army (Annual) Act 1909; Army (Amendment) Act 1915; Army (Amendment) No. 2 Act 1915; Justices of the Peace Act 1949; Army Reserve Act 1950; Law Reform (Limitation of Actions, etc.) Act 1954; Revision of the Army and Air Force Acts (Transitional Provisions) Act 1955
Repealed by	Statute Law (Repeals) Act 2008
Relates to	Army Discipline and Regulation Act 1879; Army Discipline and Regulation (Annual) Act 1881; Regulation of the Forces Act 1881

Status: Repealed

Text of statute as originally enacted

The Army Act 1881 (44 & 45 Vict. c. 58) was an act of the Parliament of the United Kingdom that consolidated enactments related to army discipline and regulation in the United Kingdom.

== Provisions ==
Section 2 of the act provided that it would continue in force only for such time, and subject to such provisions, as were specified in an annual act of Parliament bringing it into force or continuing it.

=== Repealed enactments ===
Section 193 of the act repealed 5 enactments, listed in the fifth schedule to the act. The repeal did not affect anything done, or any rights or liabilities acquired or accrued, before the commencement of the act, and so much of the Army Discipline and Regulation Act 1879 (42 & 43 Vict. c. 33) as remained unrepealed was to continue in force and be construed as if it were part of the act.

Citation	Short title	Description	Extent of repeal
47 Geo. 3. Sess. 2. c. 25	Half-pay and Pensions Act 1807	An Act for the more convenient payment of half pay and pensions and other allowances to officers and widows of officers, and the persons upon the Compassionate List.	So much as is unrepealed.
42 & 43 Vict. c. 32	Army Discipline and Regulation (Commencement) Act 1879	The Army Discipline and Regulation (Commencement) Act, 1879.	Section three, section seven, section eight, and the schedule.
42 & 43 Vict. c. 33	Army Discipline and Regulation Act 1879	The Army Discipline and Regulation Act, 1879.	The whole act, with the exception of section one hundred and seventy-seven.
44 & 45 Vict. c. 9	Army Discipline and Regulation (Annual) Act 1881	The Army Discipline and Regulation (Annual) Act, 1881.	Sections four to seven, both inclusive.
44 & 45 Vict. c. 57	Regulation of the Forces Act 1881	The Regulation of the Forces Act, 1881.	Part II, with the exception of so much of sections thirty-eight and thirty-nine as relates to the auxiliary forces, and of section forty-five. In Part III, section fifty.

== Subsequent developments ==
The whole act was repealed by section 1(1) of, and group 4 of part 1 of schedule 1 to, the Statute Law (Repeals) Act 2008, which came into force on 21 July 2008.
