= Territorial and Reserve Forces Act 1907 =

Act of the Parliament of the United Kingdom

Territorial and Reserve Forces Act 1907 (Note: Section 41.)
- Act of Parliament
- Parliament of the United Kingdom
- Long title: An Act to provide for the reorganisation of His Majesty's Military Forces and for that purpose to authorise the establishment of County Associations, and the raising and maintenance of a Territorial Force, and for amending the Acts relating to the Reserve Forces.
- Citation: 7 Edw. 7. c. 9
- Introduced by: Richard Haldane (Commons)
- Territorial extent: United Kingdom

Dates
- Royal assent: 2 August 1907
- Commencement: 2 August 1907 (Note: The Acts of Parliament (Commencement) Act 1793.)
- Repealed: 10 March 1966
Other legislation
Amends	Reserve Forces Act 1882
Amended by	Military Service Act 1916; Territorial Army and Militia Act 1921; Auxiliary Air Force and Air Force Reserve Act 1924; Auxiliary and Reserve Forces Act 1949; Justices of the Peace Act 1949; Army Reserve Act 1950; Air Force Reserve Act 1950; Auxiliary Forces Act 1953
Repealed by	Statute Law Revision Act 1966
Relates to	Army (Annual) Act 1909

Status: Repealed

Text of statute as originally enacted

The Territorial and Reserve Forces Act 1907 (7 Edw. 7. c. 9) was an act of the Parliament of the United Kingdom that reformed the auxiliary forces of the British Army by transferring existing Volunteer and Yeomanry units into a new Territorial Force (TF); and disbanding the Militia to form a new Special Reserve of the Regular Army. This reorganisation formed a major part of the Haldane Reforms, named after the creator of the act, Richard Haldane.

The lessons learned during the South African War of 1899-1902 had reinforced the idea that the Regular Army was not capable of fighting a prolonged full-scale war without significant assistance; almost all regular units in the United Kingdom had been deployed overseas within four months of the outbreak of hostilities. Furthermore, by the end of the first year of fighting, the Regular Reserve and the Militia Reserve had been entirely exhausted. (Regular reservists were members of the Regular Army who had retired from the active-duty portion of their service but remained available for the callout. The Militia Reserve was a pool of individuals within the Militia, who accepted an overseas service liability). There had been no thought before the war about the wider use of auxiliary forces overseas; in the event, volunteers had been used on an ad-hoc basis, and a new auxiliary arm (the Imperial Yeomanry) was formed to provide specialist troops, but it was clear that a more effective system was required in future. A number of attempts at reform under the Conservative government of 1901-1905 had failed to make any lasting changes to the system and left the auxiliary forces disorganised and demoralised.

With the Liberal victory in December 1905, Haldane was appointed as Secretary of State for War, and immediately set about reforming the Army to best prepare it for an intervention in a European war. He decided on a regular Expeditionary Force and planned an auxiliary "Territorial Force", to provide a second line, together with an expanded reserve for the Regular Army. He put forward a draft bill in the winter of 1906, and ensured it would be in the government's legislative program for the coming year. He outlined his vision in a series of speeches culminating in his address on the Army Estimates in February 1907. In order to ensure his bill would pass without difficulty, he consulted privately with senior Army officers and the King, as well as the leader of the Opposition, to gain their support for the principles of the legislation.

Despite his efforts, several groups vocally opposed his approach: first, the National Service League, led by Field Marshal Lord Roberts, and backed by retired senior officers and some Conservative MPs. They argued that auxiliary forces would be ineffective against Continental armies, even, at one point, enlisting the support of the king. At the same time, the Labour Party members generally opposed any increase in military strength. Further opposition came from protagonists of the existing system, especially the militia. In the face of all these forces, Haldane made a series of last-minute changes to the bill when he presented it in March 1907, including restricting compulsory service to Home defence only. Nevertheless, the structure remained much larger than was likely to be necessary for home defence and included all the supporting arms and services for the planned fourteen full divisions and he commented that 'they could go abroad if they wish.' The bill was put before the Commons on 4 March, then debated in late March and throughout April, where it received prolific but disorganised opposition, mainly from partisans of the existing system. It had its third reading in June, passing with a comfortable majority, and received royal assent in August; the act became effective immediately, though the bulk of its reforms were scheduled to begin on 1 April 1908.

The act was divided into three main sections; the first created "County Associations", which would be the local bodies which would administer and support the Territorial units - they would, however, have no military control over them when called out for service. The second section reformed the existing Volunteers and Yeomanry into the newly created Territorial Force, whilst the third dissolved the Militia and in its place created the Special Reserve, to be composed of men who had not previously served in the Regular Army.

== Background and the need for reform ==
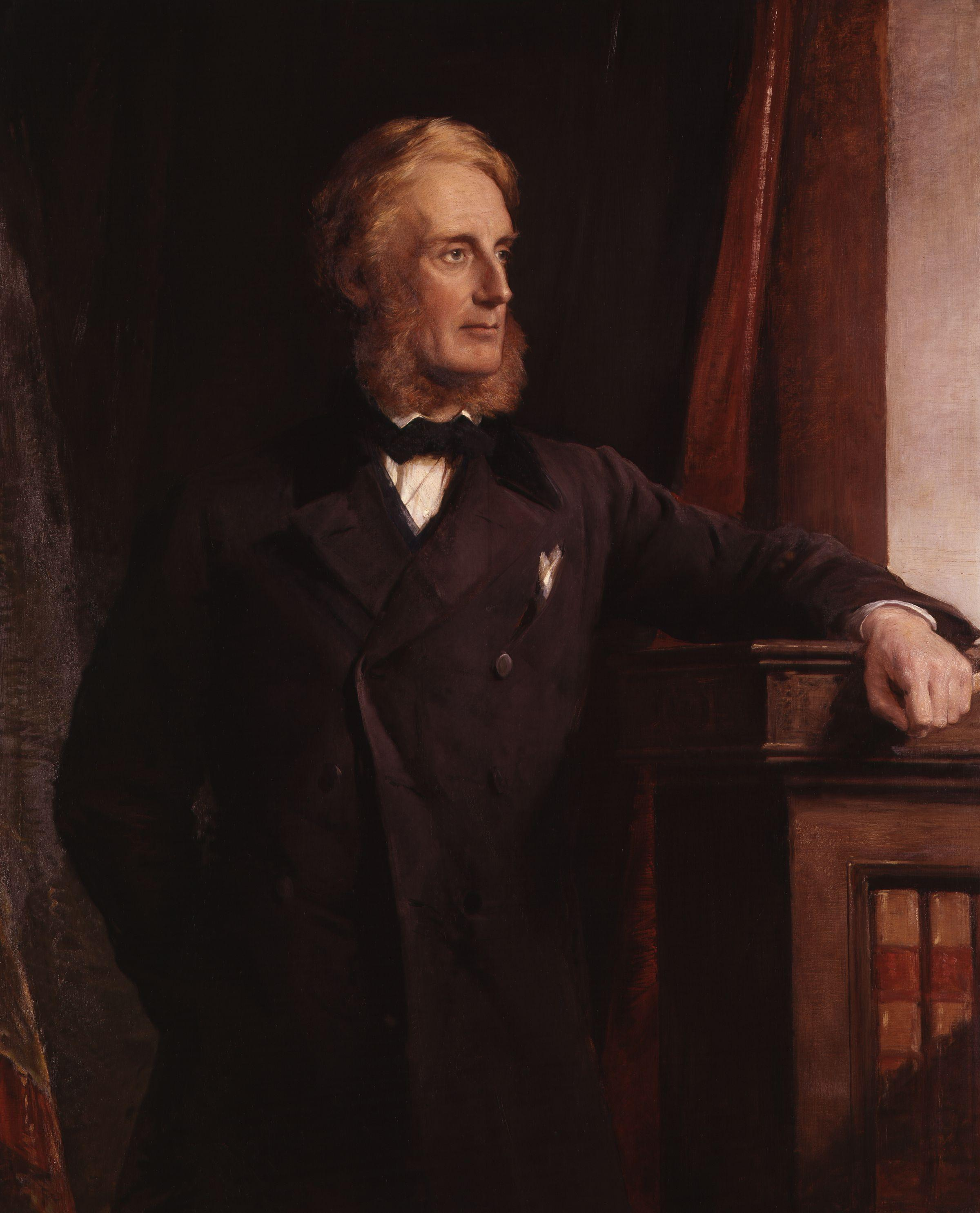
Portrait of Edward Cardwell, driving force behind the Cardwell Reforms, by George Richmond, 1871

In 1899, with the outbreak of the South African War, the British Army was committed to its first large-scale overseas deployment since the 1850s. The intervening period had seen extensive redevelopments of the Regular Army. The Cardwell Reforms of 1868–1872 had abolished the purchase of commissions, professionalising the officer corps, and reformed the system of enlistment so that recruits now served for six years with the colours and then a further six years liable for reserve service. The new reserve system had been tested in the 1882 Anglo-Egyptian War (when reservists fought overseas for the first time) and during the Pendjeh Crisis, when the reserves of one cavalry regiment and fifteen infantry regiments, totalling 4,681 men, were mobilised.

The administrative structure of the Army had been further reinforced by the creation of regimental districts, where regular infantry regiments were paired together to share a depot and linked to the local militia and volunteer units. In the early 1880s, the next step was taken by the Childers Reforms, which formally amalgamated the regiments into a single two-battalion unit along with the militia and volunteers. This meant that, in general, one battalion of each infantry regiment was based at home with its depot and one was based overseas, which meant that roughly half the Regular Army was available in the United Kingdom for responding to any new overseas commitments. It was estimated, by the "Stanhope Memorandum" of 1891, that a mobilisation of the whole Army would provide two full Army Corps of regular troops—with units reinforced individually by reservists—and a third composed partly of Regulars and partly of Militia, with the remaining auxiliary forces used for garrisons in fixed defences at the ports and around London.

=== Status of the auxiliary forces in 1899 ===
The regular units were supported by their own reserves, discussed above, and three "auxiliary forces"—the Militia, the Yeomanry, and the Volunteers. In the Militia, which was administered by the Regular Army, recruits drilled for six weeks on joining, and for one month a year thereafter, a period of time which was suited well to casual labourers or agricultural workers but was impractical for urban workers or skilled tradesmen. Thirty to forty percent of recruits were young men who passed into the Regular Army, and only twenty percent served their full six-year service. All militiamen over 19 could join the Militia Reserve, accepting the liability to serve overseas with the regular army in case of war if called on to do so: in 1898, this reserve exceeded its establishment of 30,000 by 1,049 men. The force came to 123 battalions of infantry, 32 brigades of coastal artillery, and little else; there was a small group of fortress engineers and a medical staff of about 600 men, but no service arms. If the members of a battalion volunteered for overseas service it could be sent overseas as a unit—several had done during the Crimean War, serving as colonial garrisons—but the Militia as a whole was effectively little more than a collection of independent units and not a serviceable home defence force.

The second element of the auxiliary forces was the Yeomanry, 38 regiments of volunteer cavalry which had historically been used as a form of internal security police, deployed to suppress local riots and provide a show of force to support the authorities. Recruits to the force were usually personally wealthy, providing their own horses and uniforms, and units were often heavily bankrolled by their senior officers. Training requirements were low, with an annual eight-day camp. The regiments were liable to be called out for defence against an invasion or an insurrection, and were not prepared for effective mobilisation; the units possessed no transport resources, or even a designated quartermaster.

The third arm was the Volunteers, mainly drawn from small businessmen, artisans, and professionals; they were predominantly urban middle-class units, training at weekends and with no annual camp. There were 213 rifle corps and 66 corps of artillery, though the latter were mostly coastal artillery or static "position batteries" equipped with unwieldy 40-pounder guns, and they did not constitute an organised field force. There were some engineer and medical units, but no service corps. The status of the volunteer units was further complicated by their origins as private societies; they received some central funding, but were mostly supported by local subscriptions and the generosity of their commanders.

=== Effects of the South African War ===
The reforms had ensured that a sizable force of regular troops was based in the United Kingdom for service as an expeditionary force, over and above the troops already stationed overseas. However, once the decision was taken to send a corps-size field force to fight in the South African War, the system began to show a strain. Three divisions were earmarked for deployment in October 1899, and 25,000 men were mobilised from the reserve to reinforce them; however, regulations of the time held that men under twenty should not be sent overseas, so the reservists had to replace underage or otherwise ineffective soldiers as well as filling the existing gaps. In some units, this meant reservists made up over 50% of the battalion strength; throughout the force, 36.5% of men were listed as unfit for foreign service. When the force sailed, 20,000 of the 47,000 men were reservists The field force, augmented by an additional brigade of infantry at the last minute, totalled three divisions; a fourth was organised in early November, and a fifth at the end of the month. A sixth was mobilised on 14 December, which completed the two corps originally planned as an expeditionary force, and after a brief panic in mid-December a seventh was dispatched at the end of January, leaving the country virtually empty of regular troops.

This was the end of the planned mobilisation; no thought had been given pre-war to mobilising the Militia, Yeomanry or Volunteers as formed units for foreign service. 43,000 reservists had been sent overseas with the regular forces—out of a total of 80,000—with the remainder sent overseas as reinforcements and replacements over the first year of the war. The conventional system of posting reservists to their own regiment worked until April 1900, after which it became sometimes necessary to post reservists to different regiments due to heavy losses, and by September 1900 this system had broken down entirely, with the reserves entirely exhausted of men.

On 16 December, the first request was sent from South Africa for auxiliary troops, and a commitment was made to send a "considerable force of militia and picked yeomanry and volunteers". In early January, the reinforcements to be sent out included one service company of volunteers for each regular battalion, one complete volunteer battalion, and seven militia battalions. A large number of battalions of the Militia, which had volunteered for overseas service, were eventually sent out of the country during the war; sixty, with around 46,000 men, went to South Africa, whilst eight more served in colonial garrisons. They were employed mainly on lines of communication, and regarded as second-line troops of low quality; this was unsurprising, as they were strongly deficient in officers and heavily composed of men of 18 and 19, who would have been regarded as too young by the regular Army. The deficiencies of the militia were increased by the fact that many of its best and most experienced men had volunteered for the Militia Reserve: Of the 30,000-strong militia reserve, 13,000 were stripped from their battalions and sent overseas as drafts for regular units, while some of the 10,000 who had already travelled to South Africa with the militia were subsequently transferred to regular units while overseas. Sir Ian Hamilton commented that "the men from the Militia Reserve who were in regular battalions were quite excellent... Every commanding officer I asked about them said they were first class men. The Militia battalions that had come out, had lost many of their officers, who had gone to regular battalions to replace losses in the earlier part of the war. They had also been somewhat short of officers to start with... that [line of communication service] was what they were best suited for under the circumstances."

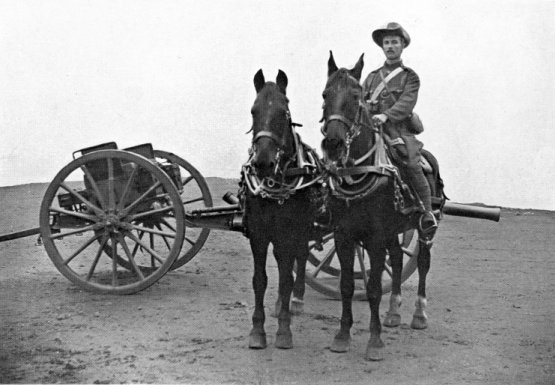
Erskine Childers whilst serving with an Honourable Artillery Company battery in the City Imperial Volunteers

The first Volunteer unit to be sent out was a composite battalion recruited from the London units, the City Imperial Volunteers, raised in early January 1900; it was sent into combat after six weeks of training in South Africa, where Lord Roberts described it as "quite excellent", and was returned home in October. At the same time, a number of service companies were raised from the volunteer units, organised by the regimental depots from the volunteer units in the district rather than by the volunteer units themselves. They were employed as integral companies of the regular battalions, and were well regarded in the field. The Yeomanry, likewise, were not employed as complete units. Whilst the initial request for auxiliaries had called for "8,000 irregulars ... organised in companies of 100" and specified that they should be equipped as mounted infantry, the Yeomanry had always been trained and equipped as shock cavalry, with sabres, carbines and lances. The decision was taken in late December to form a new force, the Imperial Yeomanry, to consist of mounted infantry organised separately from the existing Yeomanry. Whilst the Yeomanry provided many of the officers and NCOs, only a small number of recruits came from existing Yeomanry regiments, with some more from Volunteer corps; most were drawn from civilians who had not previously been members of either. The units performed well, but recruiting proceeded in fits and starts—recruitment stopped in May, and was only resumed in early 1901—and so an adequate supply of manpower was not always available.

=== Conservative reforms ===
After the "khaki election" of October 1900, the Conservative Party remained in power, but instituted a thorough reorganisation of the government. The War Office was now led by St. John Brodrick, who immediately called for extensive reform. In the debate on the Army Estimates on 8 March 1901, he dismissed a two-corps expeditionary force as insufficient, and suggested that "...besides Home Defence we ought to be ready at any moment to send abroad three Army Corps with the proper Cavalry Division ... 120,000 men". He proposed to divide the nation into six geographical corps districts, each of which would contain the appropriate units during peacetime which it would command in war. The First and Second Corps, of regulars, would be based at Aldershot and Salisbury Plain; a Third Corps, mostly regulars, would be based in Ireland. These three would constitute the force for overseas service. The Fourth, Fifth and Sixth Corps would be composed of a mixture of regular and auxiliary forces, with sixty selected "first-line" Volunteer and Militia battalions. The remaining auxiliary forces would be assigned for defensive purposes to whichever corps they were located under. The Yeomanry, meanwhile, would be heavily expanded and reformed as Imperial Yeomanry, the mounted infantry having proved of great use in South Africa. This scheme could of course not be implemented whilst the South African War was in progress, but even in peacetime it was slow to take effect; in March 1903 a report gave the Fifth and Sixth Corps as "not yet formed", large numbers of the component units for other corps were unavailable, not yet organised, or simply quartered in the wrong locations, and perhaps most remarkably, the First Corps had no brigadiers to command it—they were to be assigned on mobilisation.

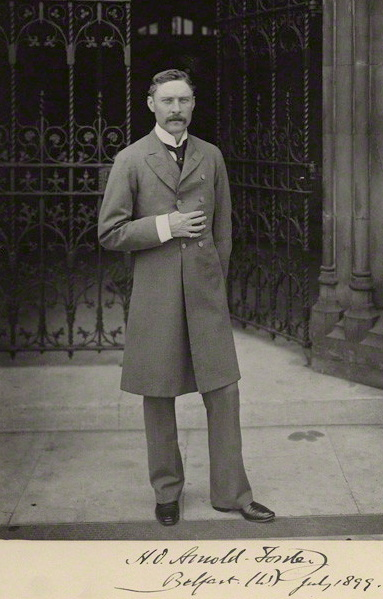
Hugh Arnold-Forster, photographed outside the Palace of Westminster in 1899.

Shortly thereafter, Hugh Arnold-Forster was appointed Secretary of State for War. One of his first acts was to appoint Lord Esher to chair a committee on War Office reform; this would culminate in the Esher Report of 1904, which called for a number of administrative reforms, including the formation of the Army Council. In the summer of 1904, the Norfolk Commission, which had been set up to consider the existing state of the Militia and Volunteers, issued its report. It advocated a form of compulsory service—which was swiftly rejected by the Government—but also offered various more pragmatic reforms which were later taken up as part of the Haldane Reforms. The state of the Militia was reported as "unfit to take the field", and the Volunteer Force was "not qualified .. against a Regular Army". For the time being, however, Arnold-Forster pressed ahead with his reforms, proposing on 14 July 1904—to strong opposition—that the Regular Army be split into a General Service Army (liable for peacetime service at home and overseas) and a Home Service Army (for peacetime service at home, and able to be sent overseas in time of crisis). The Militia was not discussed in the proposals, but he undertook to reduce the strength of the Volunteers and split them into first and second-class units. When the debate resumed in the 1905 session, Parliament having been adjourned shortly after the original announcement, it continued to be attacked, and very little progress was made in implementing it; an attempt in June 1905 to confidentially identify Volunteer units likely to be disbanded was reported by the Daily Chronicle, and questions were asked in both Houses of Parliament. Arnold-Forster was forced to back down, suggesting that he only wished to determine what proportion of the Volunteers were capable of foreign service.

By the end of this period, the constant attempts at reorganisation had proved a mixed bag, particularly for the auxiliary forces. The Militia was heavily understrength and disorganised, whilst the number of recruits for the Volunteers was falling off and the financial situation of the units was becoming worrying. The system of central per-capita grants helped support the units, despite the worrying side-effect of causing an incentive to keep as many men on the books as possible regardless of fitness, but even so it was becoming apparent that many Volunteer Corps were headed towards financial collapse unless some action were taken.

=== Haldane at the War Office ===
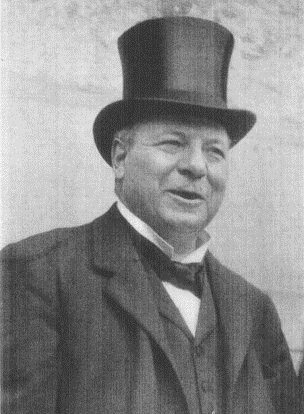
Sir Richard Haldane

In December 1905, the Balfour government collapsed, and Sir Henry Campbell-Bannerman became Prime Minister, leading a minority Liberal government. Richard Haldane was appointed Secretary of State for War, an almost accidental selection—he himself had been aiming to be Lord Chancellor, whilst Campbell-Bannerman offered him the post of Attorney-General, then the Home Office, and had offered the War Office to two other men before Haldane offered to take it. Despite this inauspicious beginning, he would become—in the words of Douglas Haig—"the greatest Secretary of State for War England has ever had". Haldane took the post with no preconceived ideas as to the role of the Army, but quickly settled on the idea that efficiency was essential as a precursor to making financial economies. After a brief hiatus during the 1906 general election, which the Liberals won comfortably, Haldane turned his attention to the Tangier Crisis, which had almost brought France and Germany to war in December. Sir Edward Grey, the Foreign Secretary, had privately agreed to commit the Army to the aid of France, if attacked, and Haldane began to consider how best to accomplish this. He quickly concluded that there was a need for a regular Expeditionary Force, specifically prepared and trained for use as a continental intervention force.

The question now became how to provide this force, and after a short period Haldane settled on a strength of six twelve-battalion infantry divisions with supporting arms. They would need to be organised in peacetime and prepared to mobilise in the United Kingdom, as they would be committed into action as soon as they reached the Continent. Because the Army was now geared to a specific purpose, it could be reorganised to fit this role, and any elements which did not support it could be discarded. These reforms anticipated that the existing tripartite division of the Army—the Regular Army, the Volunteers/Yeomanry and the Militia— should be changed into a two-part structure, with an Expeditionary Force and a much larger Territorial Force based on County Associations. In a speech in November 1906, he explained that the latter was designed to provide a second line behind the regular Expeditionary Force, with fourteen divisions, each with all the necessary artillery, engineers, commissariat and medical support, together with fourteen cavalry brigades 'as the sole means of support and expansion of the professional army', in a major war, as well as for home defence. This could, he argued be partially trained in peacetime but, upon the outbreak of war, be swiftly trained to the necessary standards. The Volunteers and Yeomanry would form the basis for the Territorial Force, whilst the Militia would be used as a reserve for the all-Regular Expeditionary Force, fully liable for service overseas.

He formed a committee— the "Territorial Force Committee", sometimes known as the "Esher Committee" after its chair Lord Esher—of 45 representatives from the Regular Army, the Militia, the Volunteers and the War Office to study the proposals and attempt to reach an agreement. The Committee first met on 22 May and sat until July. It failed to reach any effective conclusion, mostly stalling on the issue of what to do with the Militia— should it be merged with the Volunteers, or should it be formally incorporated into the Regular Army? A secondary problem was the desire of the commanders of individual volunteer units who wished to retain the greater independence their units currently possessed, rather than placing themselves under the control of other bodies.

A second attempt to gain the agreement of Militia colonels to the proposed amalgamation was made in late June, and was strongly opposed. All fourteen of the Militia representatives insisted that overseas service should be done by complete Militia battalions, rather than drafts sent to regular battalions. A third meeting, in October, proposed that the Militia join with the Volunteers as the senior element of the Territorial Force; this, too, was rejected. As both possible approaches for dealing with the Militia had been strongly opposed, the decision was taken to do away with it entirely and replace it with a newly created force, the Special Reserve, which would incorporate those elements of the Militia willing to be transferred.

Meanwhile, Haldane faced strong opposition from two other quarters: first, the National Service League, led by Field Marshal Lord Roberts, and backed by many retired senior officers and some Conservative MPs and peers who argued that auxiliary forces would be ineffective against Continental armies and that conscription was the only solution. Haldane worked closely with Lord Esher, to win over potential supporters of the League, including persuading him to lobby King Edward after Lord Roberts persuaded Edward that Territorials could never be competent in areas like artillery. At the same time, the Labour Party members generally opposed any increase in military strength and they found support among more radical members on the Liberal (government) benches. With these pressures compounded by opposition from some volunteers to compulsion in overseas wars, Haldane decided to legislate only for compulsion in home defence but continued to argue strongly for the 'Second Line' as late as his Army estimates speech on February 25, 1906 "...they would be ready, finding themselves in their units, to say - 'We wish to go abroad and take our part in the theatre of war, in the interests of the nation...'". Just eight days later, introducing the bill, he abandoned this line and repeatedly stressed that the Territorial force was to be for home defence. Nevertheless, he went on to remark that 'They could go abroad if they wish.'. The change was a tactical one, his aim remained unchanged and the planned design for the Territorial Force went ahead: 14 divisions with a full range of supporting arms and services, a large force indeed for the home defence of an island nation which was the world's premier sea power.

== Legislative history ==
The Act was drafted by Haldane, in the winter of 1906, with the assistance of John Kemp and Frederick Liddell and the support of Douglas Haig. A final draft was sent to the King on 12 January and all that remained was to ensure its passage through the House of Commons. He was confident of the support of the Prime Minister, and privately discussed the bill with Arthur Balfour, the Leader of the Opposition, in order to ensure there would not be significant Conservative Party opposition. At the time, the governing Liberal Party was mostly absorbed with problems of social reform, and it was not guaranteed that there would be time to present a defence bill. At the beginning of the year, however, Haldane discovered that a bill scheduled for the session was not yet ready, and offered "a small Bill of his own which might conveniently fill the gap".

On 25 February Haldane introduced the new Army Estimates, which showed a saving of slightly over two million pounds, and discussed the forthcoming reforms, stating that the critical problem was to ensure continued recruitment for line regiments from the Militia and to provide financial support for the stability of the Volunteer units. A memorandum issued on the same day expanded on these points, and suggested that in the event of a future war, with the Expeditionary Force sent abroad, the Territorial Force would be mobilised as an organisation for "support and expansion", and after six months' training and home defence duties, would be able to volunteer for overseas service.

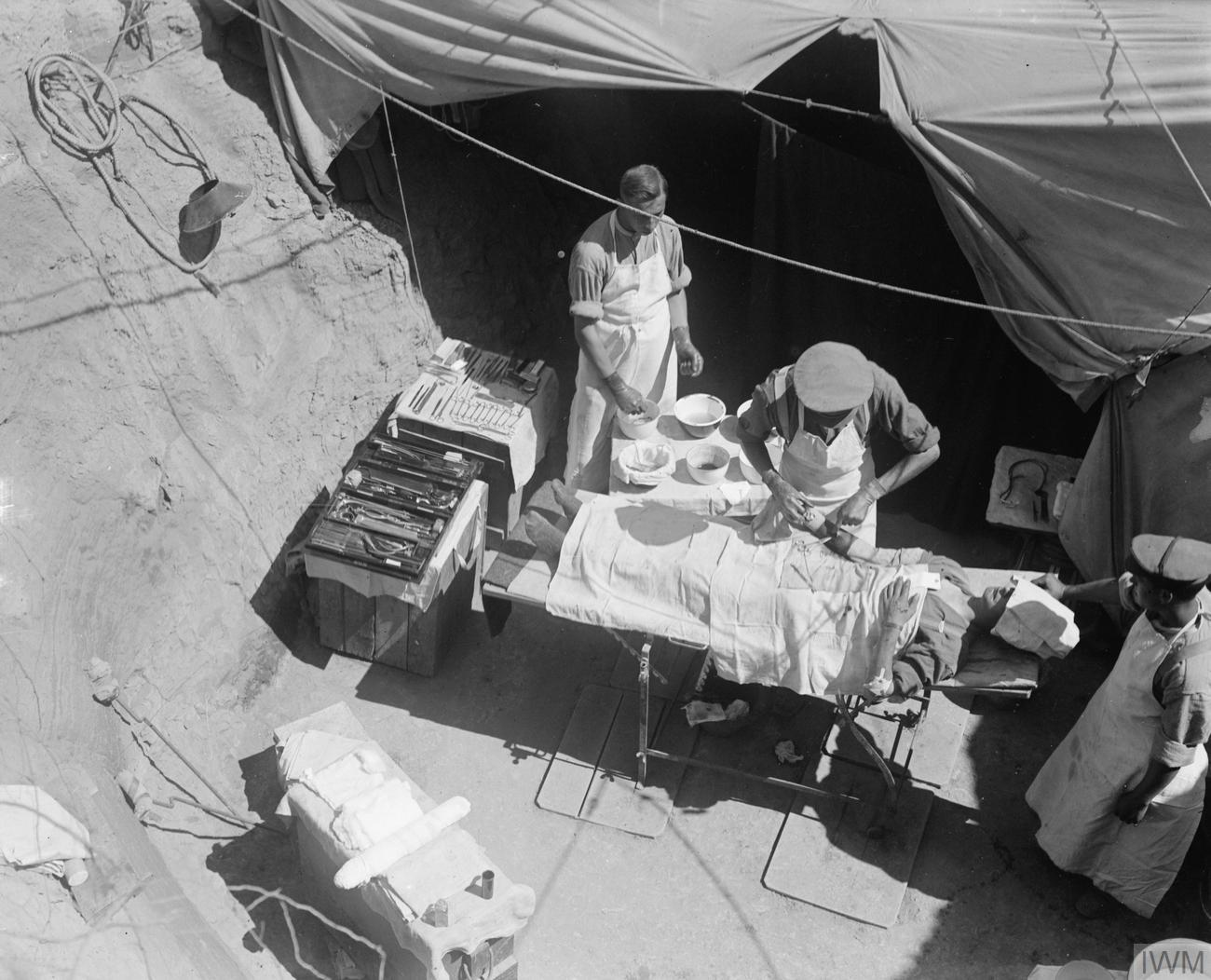
One of the new features of the Territorial Force was that its divisions would contain all of their own support units; this field surgery at Gallipoli was an organic part of the 42nd (East Lancashire) Division. Photo by Ernest Brooks.

The bill itself was formally introduced to the House of Commons on 4 March 1907. The subject was debated in the House of Lords on 21 March, where the proposed changed to the Militia were strongly opposed. The bill had its second reading in the Commons on 9, 10, and 23 April, and was passed into Committee, where it was discussed at some length over nine days. The opposition to the bill, whilst verbose, was not very effective. Hugh Arnold-Forster, the previous War Secretary, argued that the Territorial Force would prove ineffective in opposition to conscripted Continental armies, whilst the Labour Party objected generally to any increase in military strength. Most of the opposition came from partisans of the existing system; as well as the implacable opposition from the Militia element, supporters of the Yeomanry objected to the reduction in their daily rates (from 5s. 6d. to 2s. 8d.), whilst Sir Howard Vincent led the opposition from the Volunteers against the stricter control of the new regulations. However, the strong Liberal majority saw off all opposition, and the bill moved for a third reading on 19 June, where it passed with 286 votes to 63. The opposition was mainly led by the Irish MPs, who voted against the government for reasons unrelated to the bill, and some of the Labour Party; most of the Unionists, save a few like Vincent or Charles Dilke, abstained rather than oppose.

The bill then passed to a third reading in the House of Lords, where it took a few minor amendments, but escaped any significant opposition barring a brief dispute over the status of Cadet units; it was eventually agreed that they could be supported by the associations provided that no funding was to be provided from money voted by Parliament. This amendment was accepted by the government, and the bill passed smoothly to royal assent.

== Provisions of the act ==
The act had four parts. Part I established the County Associations, who would administer the system, whilst Part II covered the formation of the Territorial Force from existing units of volunteers and yeomanry. Part III created the Special Reserve and arranged for the transfer of Militia units, and Part IV contained miscellaneous other provisions as well as the related schedules.

=== Part I—County Associations ===
Part I authorised the establishment of County Associations under schemes to be drawn up by the Army Council, and laid out the expected form of these associations and their areas of authority. It provided that they were to be funded centrally but could raise funds in their own right, and that any other regulations necessary for the administration of the associations were to be made by the Army Council. It explicitly stipulated that these associations were not to have operational command over the forces they administered. The Associations still exist today but as regional bodies known as Reserve Forces and Cadets Associations.

==== Organisation of Associations ====
Section 1 of the act stipulated that the County Associations would be responsible for "...the reorganisation under this Act of His Majesty's military forces other than the regulars and their reserves, and of the administration of those forces when so reorganised". The Army Council would draw up an organising scheme for every County Association, which would define its membership and name. These schemes were to be approved by Parliament.

The Act anticipated that such schemes would have the lord-lieutenant of the county as the president, and required at least half of the membership would consist of officers drawn from all branches of the Territorial Force (or, preceding that, the Yeomanry and Volunteers). "Where desirable", members were also to include representatives of the county councils, county borough councils, and universities within the area of the Association, as well as co-opted members representative "of the interests of employers and workmen". The scheme would also lay down general administrative issues, such as the appointment of an initial chairman and officers and the rules of procedure. The schemes could permit general officers (or their deputies) to attend the meetings and speak, but not vote.

Each association was to cover a single county (corresponding to the lieutenancy counties created by the Local Government Act 1888 (51 & 52 Vict. c. 41), Local Government (Scotland) Act 1889 (52 & 53 Vict. c. 50) and Local Government (Ireland) Act 1898 (61 & 62 Vict. c. 37)). Where the county was sufficiently large, the scheme could divide it into multiple parts and assign these to sub-associations.

==== Duties of Associations ====
Section 2 of the act provided the duties of County Associations. They were primarily constituted to organise the Territorial Force within their county, but it was explicitly stipulated that they "shall not have any powers of training over any part of His Majesty's military forces". The Act permitted that virtually any relevant duties of the Crown could be assigned to the Associations, but particularly noted:

- Organisation and administration of Territorial Force units, except when called out for training or military service.
- Recruiting of the Force both in peacetime and wartime.
- Provision and maintenance of rifle ranges, buildings, magazines and sites of camps, the organisation of areas for manoeuvres, and secure storage for weapons and equipment.
- Arrangement with employers of holidays for training, and the timings of training camps.
- Establishment and support of cadet battalions and rifle clubs, with the caveat that no funding could be provided out of the Parliamentary grant in respect of any person under the age of sixteen. This caveat was a compromise introduced on the third reading of the bill; the Commons had provided that no support could be given for a person under sixteen at all, and the Lords wished to remove this restriction. The compromise was to state that no support could come from Parliamentary funds, but the associations were effectively free to raise money themselves for this purpose.
- Provision of horses for the peacetime requirements of the Force
- Supply of mobilised Territorial units within the county.
- Payment of allowances to families of men in the Force when called out for service, and the care of reservists and discharged soldiers.

=== Part II—the Territorial Force ===
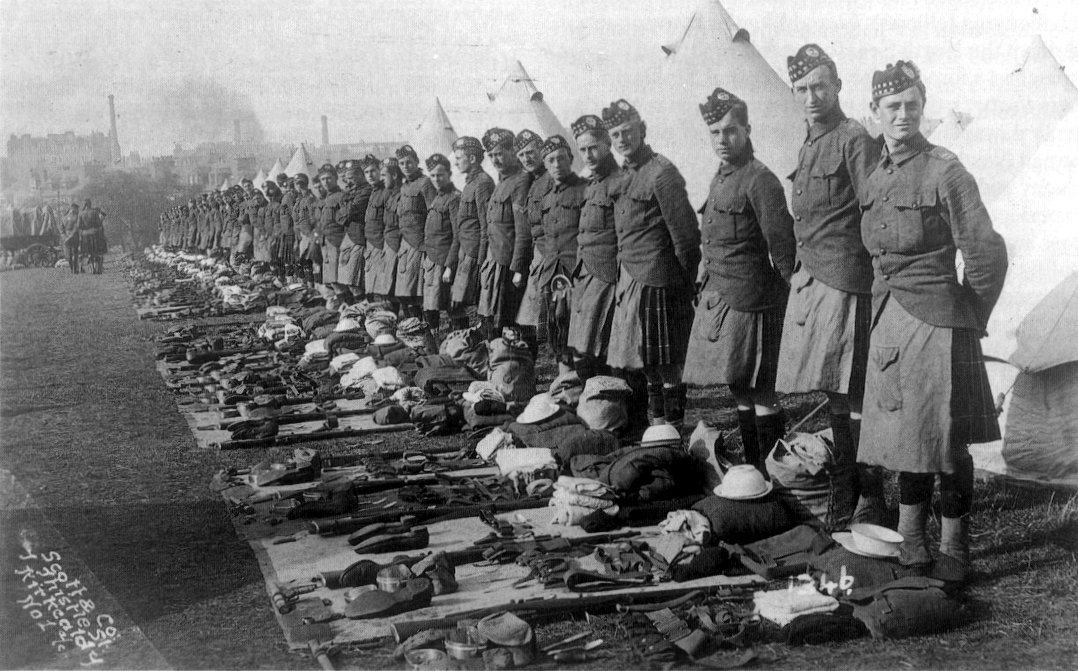
A company of the Liverpool Scottish, a Territorial unit, parading after mobilisation in September 1914

Part II of the act permitted the establishment of the Territorial Force. Regulations for government, discipline and pay were to be made by the Crown, with certain caveats. Any existing enactment which applied to the Militia, Yeomanry or Volunteers could be extended to the Territorial Force by an Order in Council. A number of enactments were subsequently applied by an order of 19 March 1908: s.20 of the Railway Regulation Act 1842 (5 & 6 Vict. c. 55), s.12 of the Railway Act 1844 (7 & 8 Vict. c. 85), s.52 of the National Defence Act 1888 (51 & 52 Vict. c. 31), s.43 of the Friendly Societies Act 1896 (59 & 60 Vict. c. 25), the whole of the Officers Commissions Act 1862 (25 & 26 Vict. c. 4), and part of s.6 of the Regulation of the Forces Act 1871 (34 & 35 Vict. c. 86).

==== Enlistment and terms of service ====
Men were to be enlisted into the Force by a specific county association and as part of a specific corps; if that corps contained multiple units, he was to be posted to one of his choosing. As with the Regular Army, men were not permitted to be transferred from one corps to another or to a regular unit without their consent. Periods of service were not to exceed four years, and could be extended for a further four years at the end of that period. If the Force was called out for permanent service when the time for a man's discharge came due, he could be required to prolong his service by up to twelve months. A member of the Force could buy his discharge before the end of his term by giving three months notice and paying a sum of up to five pounds, except in times of embodiment for service, and could be discharged for disobedience to orders or misconduct as judged by his commanding officer. First appointments to the lowest grade of officer in any Territorial Force unit were to be given to persons recommended by the association president, provided they fulfilled all the necessary qualifications.

As well as regular drills prescribed by regulation, recruits to the Force were to attend annual training for eight to fifteen days per year (eight to eighteen for cavalry), with the Crown able to extend the period of training up to thirty days or abandon annual training altogether as necessary.

The Act provided for a number of military offences and their punishments, including failure to attend on embodiment, failure to fulfil the conditions of training, and sale or destruction of government property. It also provided for the method by which offences against this act, or the Army Act, were to be tried. Members of the Force could, however, not be punished for any absence relating to voting in a Parliamentary election.

Members of the Force were exempt from service as a peace officer or parish officer, and could not be compelled to serve on a jury; field officers could not be required to serve as a high sheriff. Officers of the Force who were sheriffs were discharged from performing this duty when embodied, with the responsibility taken by the under sheriff. Accepting a commission as an officer of the Force did not vacate the seat of a Member of Parliament.

The Army Act applied to the Territorial Force and its members in the same way it applied to the Militia, with the addition of dismissal as a form of punishment, and was amended accordingly by the first schedule of the act.

==== Embodiment of the Territorial Force ====
Once a proclamation had been issued ordering the Army Reserve to be called out for permanent service, the Crown was legally permitted to order the Army Council to issue directions to embody all or part of the Territorial Force. If no such order was forthcoming, however, then unless Parliament directed otherwise the Army Council was to issue a direction for the embodiment of the entire Force. If Parliament was not sitting at the time of the proclamation, it was to resume its session within ten days. The Crown was able to issue a proclamation disembodying the whole Force, and until such proclamation was issued the Army Council was permitted to embody or disembody such elements of the Force as they saw fit.

When embodied, the Territorial Force, and its members, were liable for service anywhere within the United Kingdom, but could not be ordered out of the country. However, it was provided that any part of the Force, through its commanding officer, could offer to subject themselves to the liability for overseas service, or to be called out for military service within the country for defensive purposes even when the Territorial Force was not embodied. The Act took pains to ensure that "A person shall not be compelled to make such an offer, or be subjected to such liability ... except by his own consent", and required commanding officers to explain to every man that the offer was purely voluntary.

==== Transfer of units to the Territorial Force ====
Where a County Association had been formed, an Order in Council could be made providing for the transfer of specified Yeomanry and Volunteer units from that county, in whole or in part, into the Territorial Force. These units would be deemed to have been lawfully formed units of the Territorial Force as of the date of that Order. As of that date, every officer and man in the unit would be deemed to be a member of the Territorial Force; however, this was not to affect their terms of service. An Order in Council was made under this section on 19 March 1908, which transferred all existing units of the Yeomanry and Volunteers, with a small number of exceptions.

=== Part III—the Special Reserve ===
Part III of the act dealt with the expansion of the Army Reserve, the creation of a new class of reservists in the Special Reserve, and the transfer of militia units.

It extended the Reserve Forces Act 1882 (45 & 46 Vict. c. 48) to allow the enlistment of men who had not served in the regular forces, to be known as "special reservists". Special reservists were permitted to agree to serve for an indefinite period without discharge, and could agree in writing to be liable for callout without a proclamation or order of Parliament. No more than four thousand men could be liable under this latter provision at any one time, and the power was not to be exercised except for overseas service when "warlike operations are in preparation or in progress". The Reserve Forces and Militia Act 1898 was extended to allow up to six thousand men in total to be liable for callout without proclamation, and for the period of their liability to be up to two years.

The Special Reserve was to be organised by regulations issued under the Reserve Forces Act 1882, forming regiments and battalions either of existing regular corps or of newly created ones. The Crown was given the power to transfer, by Order in Council, existing battalions of the Militia to the Special Reserve, which were to be deemed lawfully formed battalions of special reservists as of that date. An Order in Council was accordingly made under this section on 9 April 1908, which transferred all units of the Militia, other than those which disbanded, into the Special Reserve.

Every officer of such a battalion was deemed a member of the Reserve of Officers, and every man a special reservist, though no individual's condition of service could be altered without their consent. Acceptance of a commission as a member of the Reserve of Officers would not vacate the seat of a sitting Member of Parliament.

=== Part IV—Supplemental ===
Part IV of the act contained a number of minor provisions relating to the administration of the act, including provisions for the system of Orders in Council, definitions of terms (mostly as in the Army Act), and the application of the act to Scotland and the Isle of Man.

There were three schedules; the first listed the specific amendments to the Army Act, whilst the second and third gave a listing of cities and towns and defined which county they were deemed to be part of for the purposes of the act.

The Act did not repeal any existing legislation, so the various Militia Acts dating back to the time of King Charles II remained nominally in force.

== Implementation of the act ==
The formation of County Associations proceeded smoothly; on 21 August, two weeks after the act received royal assent, it was reported that Associations were being formed in Staffordshire, Warwickshire and Worcestershire. The War Office issued a model scheme for their constitutions in September, along with advisory notes, which were sent to the lord-lieutenants of all counties. The first appointments were made to the divisional commands on 29 October.

The Territorial Force formally came into existence on 1 April 1908, at which date the existing Volunteer force ceased to exist. Under an Order in Council of 19 March, all existing units of the Yeomanry and Volunteers had been transferred to the Territorial Force, with a small number of exceptions. The transferred units were reorganised and amalgamated to produce a force of the anticipated size; with the exception of a small number of Royal Horse Artillery batteries, every new Territorial Force unit could trace its lineage to a Volunteer or Yeomanry unit.

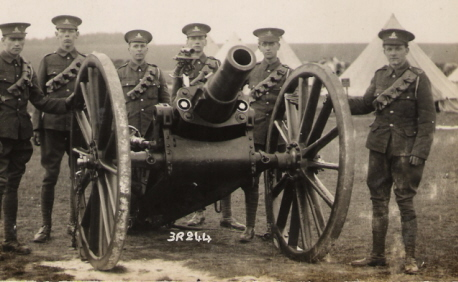
A Territorial gun crew with a BL 5 inch Howitzer, at a training camp

The Territorial Force now constituted 204 infantry battalions (ten of which were organised as bicycle infantry) and 56 Yeomanry regiments, organised into fourteen divisions and fourteen cavalry brigades, along with associated support troops. A new all-Territorial regiment, the London Regiment, was formed to encompass twenty-seven battalions which had previously been associated with various regular regiments. The divisional troops were raised and administered by the County Associations, whilst the divisions themselves were operationally commanded by regular staff officers. Outside of the divisional structure, a Territorial Medical Corps was created, followed by a Territorial Association Nursing Service.

Once the units had been transferred, their members had to decide whether they would re-enlist in the Territorial Force; the threshold for recognition was given as 30% of the establishment strength. By 5 May, the War Office had recognised 85% of the Yeomanry, 78% of the Artillery, 59% of the Engineers and 84% of the Infantry units; the total enlistment was 28% of establishment. By 1 June, the total enlistment was 48% of establishment, and the first summer camp was organised. By the end of 1908, the Territorial Force stood at 68% of establishment strength, and a popular recruiting campaign in the following spring led by the Daily Mail brought it up to 88%. In the summer of 1909, a new Territorial reserve force, the "Veteran Reserve", was announced; it began recruiting in 1910, and by the beginning of 1913 contained almost 200,000 men.

The Militia remained legally in existence, with 23 battalions which were surplus to requirements disbanded. The 101 battalions which were planned to be transferred to the Reserves trained as Militia in 1908, but amalgamated thereafter with the regular regiments, forming Special Reserve battalions (usually the 3rd Battalion); 74 were assigned to line regiments, and 27 as duplicate "Extra Special Reserve" battalions. By the end of the year, the Special Reserve as at 84% of its nominal strength; those officers and men who had not chosen to transfer remained enrolled in the Militia, serving out their six-year enlistments. By January 1913, only 700 of them remained, and this vestige quickly disappeared. All the battalions which transferred from the Militia were infantry units (with the exception of two Irish artillery units).

A group of anomalous units, as mentioned above, had not been transferred into the new system; these were the two Irish Yeomanry regiments and the Volunteers of Bermuda and the Isle of Man. The decision had been taken to have no Territorial Force units in Ireland and so the two yeomanry regiments were disbanded and reconstituted in the Special Reserve as the North Irish Horse and South Irish Horse. The Isle of Man Volunteers and Bermuda Volunteer Rifle Corps remained organised as Volunteers; whilst the new legislation did extend to the Isle of Man, the force was not reorganised there partly due to the difficulty of changing to annual training. Bermuda, the Channel Islands and Malta were not encompassed by the scope of the legislation, and so the Militia there continued to operate under the old system.

== First World War ==
The outbreak of the First World War in August 1914 saw the act and its principal issue, the Territorial Force, put to the sternest of tests; the regular Expeditionary Force of six divisions was quickly sent to the Continent, where, facing overwhelming odds, they secured the left flank of the French Army. Of the 90,000 members of the original BEF deployed in August, four-fifths were dead or wounded by Christmas. Meanwhile, as Haldane had envisaged, all 14 Territorial divisions were mobilised; the mobilisation was carried out punctually and the divisions were armed. By April 1915, six complete Territorial divisions had deployed to France. According to BEF commander in chief, Field Marshal (then) Sir John French, "Without the assistance which the Territorials afforded between October 1914 and June 1915, it would have been impossible to hold the line in France and Belgium." For detail both on this and Field Marshal Herbert Kitchener's decision to set up a parallel 'New Army' see main article Territorial Force.

== Subsequent legislation ==
The Army (Annual) Act 1909 (9 Edw. 7. c. 3) gave the Territorial Force powers of billeting in private accommodation when embodied.

Under the Military Service Act 1916 (5 & 6 Geo. 5. c. 104), which introduced conscription, the provisions of the act which prevented a Territorial soldier from being transferred to a different corps, or a regular unit, without his consent were suspended.

The Territorial Army and Militia Act 1921 (11 & 12 Geo. 5. c. 37) changed the Territorial Force into the Territorial Army, and the Special Reserve returned to its old title of Militia. The Air Force (Constitution) Act 1917 (7 & 8 Geo. 5. c. 51) had created a reserve and an auxiliary force for the newly constituted Royal Air Force, and the Auxiliary Air Force and Air Force Reserve Act 1924 (14 & 15 Geo. 5. c. 15) modified the 1907 act so as to allow County Associations to administer the Territorial Army and the Auxiliary Air Force. The Auxiliary and Reserve Forces Act 1949 (12, 13 & 14 Geo. 6. c. 96) gave the County Associations responsibility for the Army Cadet Force.

The whole act was repealed by section 1 of, and the schedule to, the Statute Law Revision Act 1966. In the Republic of Ireland, where it had ceased to have force after independence, it was formally repealed as obsolete by the Statute Law Revision Act 1983. In India, it was identified by the Law Commission of India in 1957 as being no longer useful, and accordingly was repealed by the British Statutes (Application To India) Repeal Act, 1960.

The principal legislation currently governing the Army Reserve, as the Territorial Army became, is the Reserve Forces Act 1996. Part 3 of The Defence Reform Act 2014 updated some aspects of that measure, however, including changing the name to Army Reserve.

== Bibliography ==
- Dunlop, John K. (1938). The development of the British Army 1899–1914. London: Methuen.
- Godley, Hugh, ed. (1914). Manual of Military Law (Sixth ed.). London: War Office.
  - including the text of the Territorial and Reserve Forces Act, pp. 753–776, cited by page number and section
- Sheppard, Eric (1950). A short history of the British Army (4th ed.). London: Constable.
- Chronological table of the statutes. London: HMSO. 1993. ISBN 0-11-840331-1.
- Simkins, Peter (1988). Kitchener's Army, the raising of the New Armies 1914-16. Manchester: Manchester University Press.
- Dennis, Peter (1987). The Territorial Army 1906-1940. Woodbridge, Suffolk: The Royal Historical Society: Boydell Press.
- Campbell, John (2020). Haldane, The forgotten Statesman who shaped Modern Britain. London: C Hurst and Co.
