= Reserve Forces and Militia Act 1898 =

Act of the Parliament of the United Kingdom

Reserve Forces and Militia Act 1898 (Note: Section 4.)
- Act of Parliament
- Parliament of the United Kingdom
- Long title: An Act to amend the Law relating to the Reserve Forces and Militia.
- Citation: 61 & 62 Vict. c. 9
- Territorial extent: United Kingdom

Dates
- Royal assent: 1 July 1898
- Commencement: 1 July 1898 (Note: The Acts of Parliament (Commencement) Act 1793.)
- Repealed: 1 January 1951
Other legislation
| Amends | Reserve Forces Act 1882; Militia Act 1882 |
| Amended by | Territorial and Reserve Forces Act 1907; Territorial Army and Militia Act 1921; Reserve Forces Act 1937; Auxiliary and Reserve Forces Act 1949 |
| Repealed by | Army Reserve Act 1950; Air Force Reserve Act 1950 |

Status: Repealed

Text of statute as originally enacted

The Reserve Forces and Militia Act 1898 (61 & 62 Vict. c. 9) was an act of the Parliament of the United Kingdom, which came into force in 1898.

The act allowed up to five thousand men of the Army Reserve to be called out on permanent service, without requiring the approval of Parliament as required by the Reserve Forces Act 1882. This power was only applicable to men in the first twelve months of their enlistment in the Reserve who had agreed in writing, and no man was to be liable for more than twelve months service under these provisions. The Act could not be invoked save when the men were required for active service outside the United Kingdom. This section was later amended by the Territorial and Reserve Forces Act 1907 (7 Edw. 7. c. 9) to allow up to 6,000 men to serve, rather than 5,000, with an eligibility period of two years; the Reserve Forces Act 1937 (1 Edw. 8. & 1 Geo. 6. c. 17) extended the eligibility period to the first five years in the reserves.

It also amended s.12 of the Militia Act 1882 (45 & 46 Vict. c. 49), changing the liability for service "outside of the United Kingdom" to refer to the Channel Islands, the Isle of Man, Malta, and Gibraltar.

The act gained royal assent on 1 July 1898,

== Subsequent developments ==
Section 2 of the act was repealed by section 4 of, and the second schedule to, the Territorial Army and Militia Act 1921 (11 & 12 Geo. 5. c. 37).

The residue of the act was repealed by the Auxiliary and Reserve Forces Act 1949 (12, 13 & 14 Geo. 6. c. 96). The whole act was repealed by section 29(1) of, and the third schedule to, the Army Reserve Act 1950 (14 Geo. 6. c. 32), and section 28(1) of, and part I of the third schedule to, the Air Force Reserve Act 1950 (14 Geo. 6. c. 33), which came into force on 1 January 1951.

== Bibliography ==
- p. 12-13, The Public General Acts passed in the sixty-first and sixty-second years of the reign of Her Majesty Queen Victoria. London: HMSO, 1898.
- Chronological table of the statutes. London: HMSO. 1993. ISBN 0-11-840331-1.
- Hugh Godley, ed. (1914). Manual of Military Law (Sixth ed.). London: War Office.
