= Apportionment Act 1820 =

Act of the Parliament of the United Kingdom

Apportionment Act 1820 (Note: The citation of this act by this short title was authorised by section 5 of, and the second schedule to, the Statute Law Revision Act 1948. Due to the repeal of those provisions, it is now authorised by section 19(2) of the Interpretation Act 1978.)
- Act of Parliament
- Parliament of the United Kingdom
- Long title: An Act for enabling His Majesty to settle Annuities upon certain Branches of the Royal Family in lieu of Annuities which have ceased upon the Demise of His late Majesty. (Note: These words are printed against this act in the second column of the second schedule to the Statute Law Revision Act 1948, which is headed "Title".)
- Citation: 1 Geo. 4. c. 108
- Territorial extent: United Kingdom

Dates
- Royal assent: 24 July 1820
- Commencement: 24 July 1820 (Note: The Acts of Parliament (Commencement) Act 1793.)
- Repealed: 13 March 1975
Other legislation
Amended by	Statute Law Revision Act 1873
Repealed by	Statute Law (Repeals) Act 1975

Status: Repealed

Text of statute as originally enacted

The Apportionment Act 1820 (1 Geo. 4. c. 108) was an act of the Parliament of the United Kingdom.

== Subsequent developments ==
The whole act was repealed by section 1(1) of, and part VII of the schedule to, the Statute Law (Repeals) Act 1975, which came into force on 13 March 1975.
