= Statute Law (Repeals) Act 1975 =

Act of the Parliament of the United Kingdom

Statute Law (Repeals) Act 1975 (Note: Section 2(1).)
- Act of Parliament
- Parliament of the United Kingdom
- Long title: An Act to promote the reform of the statute law by the repeal, in accordance with recommendations of the Law Commission and the Scottish Law Commission, of certain enactments which are no longer of practical utility, and to make other provision recommended by the commissions in connection with those repeals.
- Citation: 1975 c. 10
- Introduced by: Elwyn Jones, Baron Elwyn-Jones (Lords)
- Territorial extent: United Kingdom (Note: Section 2(2).)

Dates
- Royal assent: 13 March 1975
- Commencement: 13 March 1975 (Note: The Acts of Parliament (Commencement) Act 1793.)
Other legislation
Amends	See § Repealed enactments
Repeals/revokes	See § Repealed enactments
Amended by	Statute Law (Repeals) Act 1998
Relates to	See Statute Law (Repeals) Act

Status: Amended

Text of statute as originally enacted

The Statute Law (Repeals) Act 1975 (c. 10) is an act of the Parliament of the United Kingdom.

As of 2026, the act remains partly in the United Kingdom.

== Background ==
The act implemented recommendations contained in the sixth report on statute law revision, by the Law Commission and the Scottish Law Commission.

== Provisions ==
=== Repealed enactments ===
Section 1(1) of the act repealed 157 enactments, listed in parts I to XIV of the schedule to the act.

==== Part I: Administration of Justice ====
Part I — Administration of Justice
Citation	Short title	Extent of repeal
7 Will. 4 & 1 Vict. c. 46	Rolls Estate Act 1837	The whole act except section 4.
46 & 47 Vict. c. 52	Bankruptcy Act 1883	In section 32(1)(e), the words " burial board ". In section 34, the words " burial board ".
54 & 55 Vict. c. 24	Public Accounts and Charges Act 1891	Section 5.
4 & 5 Geo. 5. c. 59	Bankruptcy Act 1914	In section 33(1)(a), the words " land tax, property ". In section 120(2), the proviso. Section 131. Section 153(2). Section 168(3) and (4). Schedules 4 and 5.
11 & 12 Geo. 6. c. 38	Companies Act 1948	In section 319(1)(a)(ii), the words " land tax ".
4 & 5 Eliz. 2. c. 46	Administration of Justice Act 1956	In section 37(3), the words from " as well " to " other cases " and the words from " and accordingly " onwards.
7 & 8 Eliz. 2. c. 22	County Courts Act 1959	Sections 21(2) and 24. In section 31(1)(b), the words " or the County Courts Act 1934". In section 31(4), the words from " or the County " to " thereof " and from " or, as the case may be," to " 1934,". Section 203(2).
1964 c. 42	Administration of Justice Act 1964	In section 18(1), the words from " and the foregoing " onwards.

==== Part II: Agriculture ====
Part II — Agriculture
Citation	Short title	Extent of repeal
50 & 51 Vict. c. 27	Markets and Fairs (Weighing of Cattle) Act 1887	In section 9 as it applies to Great Britain, the words from " on the ground " to " under this Act;".
52 & 53 Vict. c. 30	Board of Agriculture Act 1889	In Schedule 1, in Part II, the entry relating to the Act 29 & 30 Vict. c. 70, for the inclosure of certain portions of the Forest of Dean called Walmore Common and the Bearce Common.
54 & 55 Vict. c. 70	Markets and Fairs (Weighing of Cattle) Act 1891	Sections 3 and 4(2) as they apply to Great Britain.
16 & 17 Geo. 5. c. 21	Markets and Fairs (Weighing of Cattle) Act 1926	In section 2, the words from the beginning to " effect, and ".

==== Part III: Ecclesiastical Livings ====
Part III — Ecclesiastical Livings
Citation	Short title	Description	Extent of repeal
51 Geo. 3. c. cxciv	Simonburn Parishes and Rectors Act 1811	An Act for erecting five distinct rectories and parishes within the rectory and parish of Simonburn, in the county of Northumberland, and for separating the same from the rectory and parish church of Simonburn; and for providing parish churches, churchyards and parsonage houses for the same; and for restraining the Commissioners and Governors of the Royal Hospital for Seamen at Greenwich, in the county of Kent, from presenting to the rectory of Simonburn, or the said new rectories, any other persons than chaplains in the Royal Navy.	The whole act except sections 26 and 27.
1 Geo. 4. c. 106	Greenwich Hospital Livings in Northumberland Act 1820	An Act to enable chaplains in the navy, presented to either of the livings of Simonburn, Wark, Bellingham, Thorneyburn, Fallstone, or Greystead, in the county of Northumberland, to receive their half-pay; and for other purposes relating to the said livings.	The whole act.
10 Geo. 4. c. 25	Greenwich Hospital Act 1829	An Act to provide for the better management of the affairs of Greenwich Hospital.	The whole act.
48 & 49 Vict. c. 31	Ecclesiastical Commissioners Act 1885	Ecclesiastical Commissioners Act 1885.	The whole act.

==== Part IV: Education ====
Part IV — Education
Citation	Short title	Extent of repeal
1 & 2 Geo. 5. c. 32	Education (Administrative Provisions) Act 1911	The whole act.
7 & 8 Geo. 6. c. 31	Education Act 1944	Sections 106 and 108 to 110. Section 114(4). Schedule 7.
9 & 10 Geo. 6. c. 50	Education Act 1946	Section 5. In Schedule 2, in Part II, the entry relating to section 106 of the Education Act 1944.
11 & 12 Geo. 6. c. 40	Education (Miscellaneous Provisions) Act 1948	In section 6(3)(b), the words from " or for whom " to " 1944 ". Section 6(3)(c). In section 6(5), paragraph (b) and the word " or " immediately preceding that paragraph. Section 6(7).
1 & 2 Eliz. 2. c. 33	Education (Miscellaneous Provisions) Act 1953	Section 7(7).

==== Part V: Employed Persons ====
Part V — Employed Persons
Citation	Short title	Description	Extent of repeal
12 & 13 Vict. c. 58	Inland Revenue Officers Act 1849	An Act to extend to the officers of Inland Revenue the privilege of becoming members of the Excise Benevolent Fund Society.	The whole act.
50 & 51 Vict. c. 46	Truck Amendment Act 1887	Truck Amendment Act 1887.	Section 16.
1 & 2 Geo. 6. c. 70	Holidays with Pay Act 1938	Holidays with Pay Act 1938.	Sections 1, 2, 3 and 5.
2 & 3 Geo. 6. c. 94	Local Government Staffs (War Service) Act 1939	Local Government Staffs (War Service) Act 1939.	The whole act.
2 & 3 Geo. 6. c. 103	Police and Firemen (War Service) Act 1939	Police and Firemen (War Service) Act 1939.	In section 1, in subsection (1) the words from "the appropriate authority" to " provided ", and subsections (2) and (3). Sections 3, 6(2), 8, 9, 10(1), 12 and 13(1) and (2).
7 & 8 Geo. 6. c. 22	Police and Firemen (War Service) Act 1944	Police and Firemen (War Service) Act 1944.	Section 3(1)(a). In section 4, in subsection (1) paragraph (a) and the words from " and accordingly " onwards, and subsections (2), (3) and (4). Section 6(2) and (3).
7 & 8 Geo. 6. c. 29	Food and Drugs (Milk and Dairies) Act 1944	Food and Drugs (Milk and Dairies) Act 1944.	The whole act.
8 & 9 Geo. 6. c. 10	Compensation of Displaced Officers (War Service) Act 1945	Compensation of Displaced Officers (War Service) Act 1945.	In section 1, in the proviso, the words " section five and ". Sections 2 to 5. Section 6(2). In section 8(1), the definitions of " the Minister ", " officer of the local authority on war service ", " prescribed " and " public utility undertakers ". Section 8(2). In section 9, paragraphs (a), (c), (e) and (f). The Schedule.
15 & 16 Geo. 6 & 1 Eliz. 2. c. 44	Customs and Excise Act 1952	Customs and Excise Act 1952.	In section 2(3), the words " and the Inland Revenue Life Assurance Benevolent Fund Society respectively ".

==== Part VI: Family Law ====
Part VI — Family Law
Citation	Short title	Extent of repeal
11 & 12 Geo. 5. c. 18	Indian Divorces (Validity) Act 1921	The whole act.
12 & 13 Geo. 5. c. 10	Kenya Divorces (Validity) Act 1922	The whole act.
16 & 17 Geo. 5. c. 40	Indian and Colonial Divorce Jurisdiction Act 1926	Section 3.
22 & 23 Geo. 5. c. 46	Children and Young Persons Act 1932	Schedule 5 except so much of paragraph 5 as relates to section 90.
7 & 8 Geo. 6. c. 43	Matrimonial Causes (War Marriages) Act 1944	Sections 1 and 2. In section 5(1), all the definitions other than that of the expression "Dominion court". Section 5(2).
12, 13 & 14 Geo. 6. c. 76	Marriage Act 1949	In section 16(4), the words from " and has given " onwards. Section 32(6).
12, 13 & 14 Geo. 6. c. 78	Married Women (Restraint upon Anticipation) Act 1949	In section 1(2), the words from " and accordingly " onwards.
12, 13 & 14 Geo. 6. c. 100	Law Reform (Miscellaneous Provisions) Act 1949	Sections 1, 2 and 4(2).
14 Geo. 6. c. 37	Maintenance Orders Act 1950	In Schedule 1, the entries relating to the Children and Young Persons Act (Northern Ireland) 1950.
6 & 7 Eliz. 2. c. 39	Maintenance Orders Act 1958	In section 23(2), the words " the said paragraph (a) ".
1969 c. 32	Finance Act 1969	Section 16.

==== Part VII: Finance ====
Part VII — Finance
Citation	Short title	Extent of repeal
1 Geo. 4. c. 108	Apportionment Act 1820	The whole act.
29 & 30 Vict. c. 39	Exchequer and Audit Departments Act 1866	In section 3, the words " and Assistant Comptroller and Auditor ". In section 6, the words " or of the Assistant Comptroller and Auditor ". In section 42, the words " any writ of extent or ".
11 & 12 Geo. 5. c. 52	Exchequer and Audit Departments Act 1921	Section 8(4).
13 Geo. 5. Sess. 2. c. 2	Irish Free State (Consequential Provisions) Act 1922	In section 2, the words " or the growing produce thereof ".
1 & 2 Geo. 6. c. 25	Eire (Confirmation of Agreements) Act 1938	In section 2(3)(e), the words "or the growing produce thereof".
2 & 3 Geo. 6. c. 11	Czecho-Slovakia (Restriction on Banking Accounts, &c.) Act 1939	In section 1(4), the words " or the growing produce thereof".
11 & 12 Geo. 6. c. 49	Finance Act 1948	Section 81.
12, 13 & 14 Geo. 6. c. 36	War Damage (Public Utility Undertakings, &c.) Act 1949	In section 34(3), in the definition of " Consolidated Fund ", the words " or the growing produce thereof ".
10 & 11 Eliz. 2. c. 44	Finance Act 1962	Section 1 except in subsection (4) the words from " in the excise Acts " onwards.
1968 c. 74	Customs (Import Deposits) Act 1968	The whole act.
1969 c. 64	Customs (Import Deposits) Act 1969	The whole act.

==== Part VIII: Local Government ====
Part VIII — Local Government
Citation	Short title	Description	Extent of repeal
11 Hen. 7. c. 9	Lordship of Tyndal Act 1495	An Acte to make the Lordshipp of North Tyndall & South Tyndall within the County of Northumberland.	The whole act.
14 Eliz. 1. c. 13	Hexhamshire Act 1572	An Acte for the annexing of Hexhamshire to the Countye of Northumberland.	The whole act.
3 & 4 Will. 4. c. 30	Poor Rate Exemption Act 1833	Poor Rate Exemption Act 1833.	The whole act.
7 Will. 4 & 1 Vict. c. 53	Liberty of Ely Act 1837	Liberty of Ely Act 1837.	The whole act.
5 & 6 Vict. c. 110	Coventry Act 1842	An Act to annex the county of the City of Coventry to Warwickshire, and to define the boundary of the City of Coventry.	The whole act.
10 & 11 Vict. c. 34	Towns Improvement Clauses Act 1847	Towns Improvement Clauses Act 1847.	Sections 200 to 208, including those sections as incorporated in any other Act.
10 & 11 Vict. c. 89	Town Police Clauses Act 1847	Town Police Clauses Act 1847.	Sections 69 and 73 as they apply to England and Wales, including those sections as incorporated in any other Act. Sections 70 and 71, including those sections as incorporated in any other Act.
32 & 33 Vict. c. 70	Contagious Diseases (Animals) Act 1869	Contagious Diseases (Animals) Act 1869.	The whole act.
45 & 46 Vict. c. 50	Municipal Corporations Act 1882	Municipal Corporations Act 1882.	Schedule 4. In Schedule 9, the references in Part I to the Liberties Act 1850, the Burial Act 1854, the Burial Act 1857 and the Explosives Act 1875.
46 & 47 Vict. c. 18	Municipal Corporations Act 1883	Municipal Corporations Act 1883.	Section 13(3). Sections 16 and 18. Section 26. In section 27, the definition of " Municipal Corporation Acts ". Schedule 2.
47 & 48 Vict. c. 12	Public Health (Confirmation of Byelaws) Act 1884	Public Health (Confirmation of Byelaws) Act 1884.	The whole act.
51 & 52 Vict. c. 41	Local Government Act 1888	Local Government Act 1888.	Section 63, except as applied by section 7(3) of the Locomotives Act 1898. In Schedule 1, the words from " Licences for the sale ", where those words secondly occur, to " Retailers of table beer", and the words "Guns", " Tobacco dealers " and " Horses and mules ".
59 & 60 Vict. c. 9	Local Government (Determination of Differences) Act 1896	Local Government (Determination of Differences) Act 1896.	The whole act, except as applied by section 7(3) of the Locomotives Act 1898.
3 & 4 Geo. 5. c. 19	Local Government (Adjustments) Act 1913	Local Government (Adjustments) Act 1913.	The whole act.
11 & 12 Geo. 5. c. 67	Local Authorities (Financial Provisions) Act 1921	Local Authorities (Financial Provisions) Act 1921.	The whole act.
15 & 16 Geo. 5. c. 71	Public Health Act 1925	Public Health Act 1925.	Section 80.
16 & 17 Geo. 5. c. 38	Local Government (County Boroughs and Adjustments) Act 1926	Local Government (County Boroughs and Adjustments) Act 1926.	The whole act.
19 & 20 Geo. 5. c. 17	Local Government Act 1929	Local Government Act 1929.	Sections 46, 50 and 114. In section 134, the definitions of " poor law authority " and " poor law area ". In section 138(2), the words from " (except " to " hereditaments) ".
24 & 25 Geo. 5. c. 7	Rural Water Supplies Act 1934	Rural Water Supplies Act 1934.	The whole act.
7 & 8 Geo. 6. c. 26	Rural Water Supplies and Sewerage Act 1944	Rural Water Supplies and Sewerage Act 1944.	Section 1(7).
11 & 12 Geo. 6. c. 26	Local Government Act 1948	Local Government Act 1948.	Part I. Section 141.
6 & 7 Eliz. 2. c. 55	Local Government Act 1958	Local Government Act 1958.	Part I. Schedule 1. In Schedule 8, paragraphs 3 to 10 and 12 to 14, and in paragraph 35 the words " 1,", " 6," and " 17,".
7 & 8 Eliz. 2. c. 32	Eisteddfod Act 1959	Eisteddfod Act 1959.	Section 2.
7 & 8 Eliz. 2. c. 72	Mental Health Act 1959	Mental Health Act 1959.	In Schedule 7, the entry relating to Part III of Schedule 1 to the Local Government Act 1958.
9 & 10 Eliz. 2. c. 20	Home Safety Act 1961	Home Safety Act 1961.	Sections 1(3) and 2(2).
10 & 11 Eliz. 2. c. 12	Education Act 1962	Education Act 1962.	Section 7.
10 & 11 Eliz. 2. c. 33	Health Visiting and Social Work (Training) Act 1962	Health Visiting and Social Work (Training) Act 1962.	In section 5(2), the words from " sections two and three " (where they first occur) to " be, of ".
10 & 11 Eliz. 2. c. 56	Local Government (Records) Act 1962	Local Government (Records) Act 1962.	Section 4(2).
1963 c. 33	London Government Act 1963	London Government Act 1963.	In section 31(8), the words " or section 3(4) of the Local Government Act 1958 ". Sections 64, 65 and 66(6). In Schedule 2, paragraph 10.
1964 c. 75	Public Libraries and Museums Act 1964	Public Libraries and Museums Act 1964.	Section 22.
1966 c. 9	Rating Act 1966	Rating Act 1966.	Section 10.
1966 c. 42	Local Government Act 1966	Local Government Act 1966.	Sections 12 and 13.

==== Part IX: Property ====
Part IX — Property
Citation	Short title	Extent of repeal
28 & 29 Vict. c. 89	Greenwich Hospital Act 1865	Section 25.
14 & 15 Geo. 6. c. 28	Long Leases (Temporary Provisions) (Scotland) Act 1951	The whole act.
14 & 15 Geo. 6. c. 38	Leasehold Property (Temporary Provisions) Act 1951	The whole act.
1 & 2 Eliz. 2. c. 12	Leasehold Property Act and Long Leases (Scotland) Act Extension Act 1953	The whole act.
1965 c. 75	Rent Act 1965	Section 35(5), (6) and (7).

==== Part X: Road Traffic ====
Part X — Road Traffic
Citation	Short title	Description	Extent of repeal
5 & 6 Will. 4. c. 50	Highway Act 1835	Highway Act 1835.	In section 5, the definitions of " surveyor ", " petty session " and " petty sessions ". Section 77. In section 78, the words from " and in either of the said cases " onwards. Sections 103, 110, 114 and 115.
10 & 11 Vict. c. 89	Town Police Clauses Act 1847	Town Police Clauses Act 1847.	In section 28, including that section as incorporated in any other Act, the paragraph beginning " Every person who at one time ".
28 & 29 Vict. c. 74	War Department Tramway (Devon) Act 1865	An Act to enable Her Majesty's Secretary of State for the War Department to lay down and use a tramway or temporary railway across certain public roads in the county of Devon.	The whole act.
61 & 62 Vict. c. 29	Locomotives Act 1898	Locomotives Act 1898.	In section 17, in subsection (1), in the paragraph defining " county " the words " and includes a county borough ", the paragraph defining " council of a county " and " county council ", the paragraph beginning " In the case of a county borough " and the definition of " waggon ", and subsection (3).
10 & 11 Geo. 5. c. 72	Roads Act 1920	Roads Act 1920.	In section 19, subsections (1) and (2), and in subsection (3) the words " and the Motor Car Acts 1896 and 1903 ". In Schedule 1, in the first paragraph the references to sections 11 and 13 of the Development and Road Improvement Funds Act 1909, and the paragraphs relating to those sections.
20 & 21 Geo. 5. c. 43	Road Traffic Act 1930	Road Traffic Act 1930.	Section 54(3).
8 & 9 Eliz. 2. c. 16	Road Traffic Act 1960	Road Traffic Act 1960.	In Schedule 17, the entry relating to the Highways Act 1959. In Schedule 20, sub-paragraph (b) of paragraph 1.
10 & 11 Eliz. 2. c. 13	Vehicles (Excise) Act 1962	Vehicles (Excise) Act 1962.	The whole act.
10 & 11 Eliz. 2. c. 59	Road Traffic Act 1962	Road Traffic Act 1962.	In section 49(1), the words from " and ' road ' " onwards.
1967 c. 76	Road Traffic Regulation Act 1967	Road Traffic Regulation Act 1967.	In section 9(12), the words " and the next following ". Section 62(3).
1969 c. 27	Vehicle and Driving Licences Act 1969	Vehicle and Driving Licences Act 1969.	In section 29(3), the word "Accordingly ".

==== Part XI: Royal Forces ====
Part XI — Royal Forces
Citation	Short title	Extent of repeal
16 & 17 Vict. c. 73	Naval Volunteers Act 1853	In section 21, as incorporated by section 4 of the Naval Enlistment Act 1884, the words from " volunteer " to " or other ".
22 & 23 Vict. c. 40	Royal Naval Reserve (Volunteer) Act 1859	In section 7, the words from " while he shall be " to " such volunteer shall " including those words as applied by any other Act. The following provisions, including those provisions as applied by any other Act:— Sections 16 and 17. In section 18, the words from "and any such volunteer " onwards. Sections 24 and 25.
45 & 46 Vict. c. 50	Municipal Corporations Act 1882	Section 253, including that section as applied by the Air Force (Application of Enactments) (No. 2) Order 1918. In Schedule 9, the reference to the Royal Naval Reserve (Volunteer) Act 1859.
14 Geo. 6. c. 32	Army Reserve Act 1950	Section 25.
14 Geo. 6. c. 33	Air Force Reserve Act 1950	Section 24.

==== Part XII: Town and Country Planning ====
Part XII — Town and Country Planning
Citation	Short title	Extent of repeal
25 & 26 Geo. 5. c. 47	Restriction of Ribbon Development Act 1935	Section 21. In section 24(1), the definitions of " Middle of the road ", " Minister ", " Owner ", " Proposed road " and " Statutory undertakers ".
10 & 11 Geo. 6. c. 51	Town and Country Planning Act 1947	In section 113(1), the words " Subject to the provisions of this section " and the words " on and after the appointed day ". In section 120(3), the words from "(except " to "thereof)". In Schedule 8, the entries relating to the restriction of Ribbon Development Act 1935, the Housing Act 1936, the Distribution of Industry Act 1945, the Trunk Roads Act 1946, and the Acquisition of Land (Authorisation Procedure) Act 1946.
10 & 11 Geo. 6. c. 53	Town and Country Planning (Scotland) Act 1947	In section 113(1), the definitions of "Act of 1932 ", "Act of 1945 ", " advertisement ", " area of extensive war damage " and " area of bad lay-out or obsolete development ", " building operations ", " clearing ", " common " and " open space ", " Consolidated Fund ", " development ", "development charge", "development order ", " engineering operations ", " erection ", " feu charter ", " functions ", " government department ", " heritable security ", " industrial building ", " interim development authority", " interim development order", " local planning authority ", " means of access ", " minerals ", " mining lease ", " Minister ", " National Coal Board ", " National Trust for Scotland ", " operational land ", " owner ", " planning permission ", " planning permission granted for a limited period only ", " planning scheme ", " purchase notice ", " relocation of population or industry ", " replacement of open space ", " requisitioned land " and " period of requisition ", " statutory undertakers ", " tree preservation order ", " use ", " Valuation Office " and " war damage ". In Schedule 8, the entries relating to the Housing (Scotland) Act 1935, Schedule 4 to the Trunk Roads Act 1936, the Distribution of Industry Act 1945, the Trunk Roads Act 1946 and section 2 of the Acquisition of Land (Authorisation Procedure) (Scotland) Act 1947.
2 & 3 Eliz. 2. c. 72	Town and Country Planning Act 1954	In section 69, in subsection (1) the definitions of " compulsory acquisition ", " interest in land " and " public authority possessing compulsory purchase powers ", in subsection (2) the words " Subject to the preceding subsection and ", and subsection (6).
2 & 3 Eliz. 2. c. 73	Town and Country Planning (Scotland) Act 1954	In section 69(1), the definitions of " the Act of 1953 ", " claim holding ", " compensation calculated on the basis of equivalent reinstatement ", "compensation calculated on the basis of prevailing use ", " compensation on the basis of existing use ", " compulsory acquisition ", " established claim " and " claim area ", " new development ", " prescribed ", " previous apportionment ", " public authority possessing compulsory purchase powers ", " unexpended balance of established development value " and " original unexpended balance of established development value ", " valuable consideration " and " will ". Section 69(5) and (10). Section 71(3).
7 & 8 Eliz. 2. c. 53	Town and Country Planning Act 1959	Section 34. In section 57(1), the definitions of " authority to whom the Act of 1919 applies ", " government department ", " outline application ", "planning decision ", " special enactment " and " tenancy ". Section 58(3).
7 & 8 Eliz. 2. c. 70	Town and Country Planning (Scotland) Act 1959	In section 54(1), the definitions of " authority to whom the Act of 1919 applies ", " outline application ", " planning decision ", " planning permission " and " special enactment ". In section 55(3), the words "and repeals in " and the words " and Eighth ". In Schedule 7, the entry relating to section 30(6) of the Town and Country Planning (Scotland) Act 1954.
10 & 11 Eliz. 2. c. 38	Town and Country Planning Act 1962	In section 224, the words " saving, transitional provision or ".
1968 c. 72	Town and Country Planning Act 1968	Section 39(2).
1969 c. 30	Town and Country Planning (Scotland) Act 1969	Section 28. In section 103(1), the definitions of " the Act of 1945 ", " the Act of 1954 ", " the Act of 1965 ", " bridleway " and " footpath ", " the Lands Tribunal ", " new development " and " prescribed ". Section 103(3). Section 106. In section 108(3), the words from " except ", where it first occurs, to " 1957 ". Schedule 10.
1971 c. 78	Town and Country Planning Act 1971	In section 190(1), the words " county borough ". In Schedule 24, paragraphs 51 and 93.

==== Part XIII: Miscellaneous ====
Part XIII — Miscellaneous
Citation	Short title	Description	Extent of repeal
15 & 16 Vict. c. 70	Holloway Prison Act 1852	An Act for authorising the occupation of the house of correction recently erected by and for the City of London at Holloway in the County of Middlesex.	The whole act.
23 & 24 Vict. c. 5	Indian Securities Act 1860	Indian Securities Act 1860.	In section 1, the words " and bona notabilia ".
56 & 57 Vict. c. 5	Regimental Debts Act 1893	Regimental Debts Act 1893.	In section 9(1), the words " military or other ".
2 & 3 Geo. 5. c. 31	Pilotage Act 1913	Pilotage Act 1913.	Section 54.
5 & 6 Geo. 5. c. 1	Anglo-Portuguese Commercial Treaty Act 1914	Anglo-Portuguese Commercial Treaty Act 1914.	In section 1, proviso (b) and the word " or " immediately preceding that proviso.
9 & 10 Geo. 5. c. 92	Aliens Restriction (Amendment) Act 1919	Aliens Restriction (Amendment) Act 1919.	In section 13(1), the words from " or any " to " thereunder ".
15 & 16 Geo. 5. c. 87	Tithe Act 1925	Tithe Act 1925.	Section 1.
26 Geo. 5 & 1 Edw. 8. c. 43	Tithe Act 1936	Tithe Act 1936.	In section 7(1), the words from " issued to ", where first occurring, to " shall be ". Section 14A.
15 & 16 Geo. 6 & 1 Eliz. 2. c. 52	Prison Act 1952	Prison Act 1952.	Section 43(3)(a).
1963 c. 25	Finance Act 1963	Finance Act 1963.	In Schedule 12, paragraph 22.
1964 c. 35	Pharmacy and Poisons (Amendment) Act 1964	Pharmacy and Poisons (Amendment) Act 1964.	The whole act.
1968 c. 29	Trade Descriptions Act 1968	Trade Descriptions Act 1968.	Sections 41(2) and 42. Schedule 2.
1969 c. 61	Expiring Laws Act 1969	Expiring Laws Act 1969.	The whole act.

==== Part XIV: Scotland Only ====
Part XIV — Scotland Only
Citation	Short title	Description	Extent of repeal
1 Geo. 1. St. 2. c. 54	Highlands Services Act 1715	Highlands Services Act 1715.	The whole act.
22 Geo. 2. c. 29	Argyllshire Valuation Act 1748	An Act for making an authentick Roll of Valuation for the Shire of Argyll.	The whole act.
59 Geo. 3. c. 27	Felony Act 1819	Felony Act 1819.	The whole act.
20 & 21 Vict. c. 58	Lands Valuation (Scotland) Act 1857	Lands Valuation (Scotland) Act 1857.	Section 4.
24 & 25 Vict. c. 27	Assessments in Edinburgh Act 1861	An Act to declare the limits within which increased assessments are authorised to be raised in the City of Edinburgh, under the provisions of the Act of the twenty-third and twenty-fourth years of Victoria, chapter fifty.	The whole act.
26 & 27 Vict. c. 10	Salmon Acts Amendment Act 1863	Salmon Acts Amendment Act 1863.	In section 4, the words from "in England," to " Fisheries (Ireland) Act 1842; ".
30 & 31 Vict. c. 80	Valuation of Lands (Scotland) Amendment Act 1867	Valuation of Lands (Scotland) Amendment Act 1867.	Section 2.
31 & 32 Vict. c. 42	Municipal Rate (Edinburgh) Act 1868	Municipal Rate (Edinburgh) Act 1868.	The whole act.
31 & 32 Vict. c. 101	Titles to Land Consolidation (Scotland) Act 1868	Titles to Land Consolidation (Scotland) Act 1868.	Sections 52, 54, 55, 151 and 153. In section 162, the words " It shall be lawful for " and the words from " from time to time " to " such burgh; and the said Court ".
33 & 34 Vict. c. 33	Salmon Acts Amendment Act 1870	Salmon Acts Amendment Act 1870.	Section 4.
40 & 41 Vict. c. 36	Registration of Leases (Scotland) Amendment Act 1877	Registration of Leases (Scotland) Amendment Act 1877.	Section 2.
52 & 53 Vict. c. 27	Advertising Stations (Rating) Act 1889	Advertising Stations (Rating) Act 1889.	The whole act.
16 & 17 Geo. 5. c. 47	Rating (Scotland) Act 1926	Rating (Scotland) Act 1926.	Section 2(4). Section 12(5) and (6). In section 14(1), the words " or section sixty of the Burgh Police (Scotland) Act 1903,". In section 29(1), the definitions of the expressions " burgh ", " police burgh ", " county " and " owner ".
17 & 18 Geo. 5. c. 35	Sheriff Courts and Legal Officers (Scotland) Act 1927	Sheriff Courts and Legal Officers (Scotland) Act 1927.	Section 11.
18 & 19 Geo. 5. c. 44	Rating and Valuation (Apportionment) Act 1928	Rating and Valuation (Apportionment) Act 1928.	Section 9(10). In section 9(13), the words " or section sixty of the Burgh Police (Scotland) Act 1903 ". Section 10(2).
23 & 24 Geo. 5. c. 41	Administration of Justice (Scotland) Act 1933	Administration of Justice (Scotland) Act 1933.	Section 1. Section 4(4) and (6). In section 5, the words from the beginning to " cease ". Sections 8 and 12(2). In section 14(1), the words from the beginning to " effect and ".
1 Edw. 8 & 1 Geo. 6. c. 37	Children and Young Persons (Scotland) Act 1937	Children and Young Persons (Scotland) Act 1937.	Section 57(4).
2 & 3 Geo. 6. c. 4	Custody of Children (Scotland) Act 1939	Custody of Children (Scotland) Act 1939.	Section 1(2).
4 & 5 Geo. 6. c. 25	Rating (War Damage) (Scotland) Act 1941	Rating (War Damage) (Scotland) Act 1941.	The whole act.
11 & 12 Geo. 6. c. 26	Local Government Act 1948	Local Government Act 1948.	Sections 90 and 92(2) and, as from 16th May 1975, section 139.
11 & 12 Geo. 6. c. 57	Public Registers and Records (Scotland) Act 1948	Public Registers and Records (Scotland) Act 1948.	In section 2, paragraph (c).
4 & 5 Eliz. 2. c. 9	Rating and Valuation (Miscellaneous Provisions) Act 1955	Rating and Valuation (Miscellaneous Provisions) Act 1955.	Sections 6, 14 and 17(4). In section 17(5), the words " Subject to the last preceding subsection,". Schedule 4.
4 & 5 Eliz. 2. c. 60	Valuation and Rating (Scotland) Act 1956	Valuation and Rating (Scotland) Act 1956.	Section 15(7) and (8).
6 & 7 Eliz. 2. c. 64	Local Government and Miscellaneous Financial Provisions (Scotland) Act 1958	Local Government and Miscellaneous Financial Provisions (Scotland) Act 1958.	In Schedule 4, paragraphs 21 and 23 as from 16th May 1975.
8 & 9 Eliz. 2. c. 61	Mental Health (Scotland) Act 1960	Mental Health (Scotland) Act 1960.	In Schedule 4, as from 16th May 1975, the entry relating to the Local Government (Scotland) Act 1929.
1963 c. 12	Local Government (Financial Provisions) (Scotland) Act 1963	Local Government (Financial Provisions) (Scotland) Act 1963.	Section 23 as from 16th May 1975.
1966 c. 7	Local Government (Pecuniary Interests) (Scotland) Act 1966	Local Government (Pecuniary Interests) (Scotland) Act 1966.	The whole act as from 16th May 1975.
1969 c. 26	Agriculture (Spring Traps) (Scotland) Act 1969	Agriculture (Spring Traps) (Scotland) Act 1969.	The whole act.

== Subsequent developments ==
Sections 1(1), 1(3), 2(2) of, and the schedule to, the act were repealed by group 2 of part IX of schedule 1 to, the Statute Law (Repeals) Act 1998, which came into force on 19 November 1998.

== See also ==
- Statute Law (Repeals) Act

== Bibliography ==
- Halsbury's Statutes. Fourth Edition. 2008 Reissue. Volume 41. Page 791.
- Peter Allsop (General editor). Current Law Statutes Annotated 1975. Sweet & Maxwell, Stevens & sons. London. W Green & son. Edinburgh. 1975. Volume 1.
- HL Deb vol 354, col 1500, vol 355, cols 540 to 541, vol 357, col 996, HC Deb vol 888, cols 462 to 467.
