= Local Government (County Boroughs and Adjustments) Act 1926 =

Act of the Parliament of the United Kingdom

Local Government (County Boroughs and Adjustments) Act 1926 (Note: Section 6(1).)
- Act of Parliament
- Parliament of the United Kingdom
- Long title: An Act to amend the law with respect to the constitution and extension of county boroughs, and to amend the Local Government (Adjustments) Act, 1913.
- Citation: 16 & 17 Geo. 5. c. 38
- Territorial extent: England and Wales (Note: Section 6(1).)

Dates
- Royal assent: 15 December 1926
- Commencement: 15 December 1926 (Note: The Acts of Parliament (Commencement) Act 1793.)
- Repealed: 13 March 1975
Other legislation
Amends	Local Government Act 1888
Amended by	Local Government Act 1933
Repealed by	Statute Law (Repeals) Act 1975

Status: Repealed

Text of statute as originally enacted

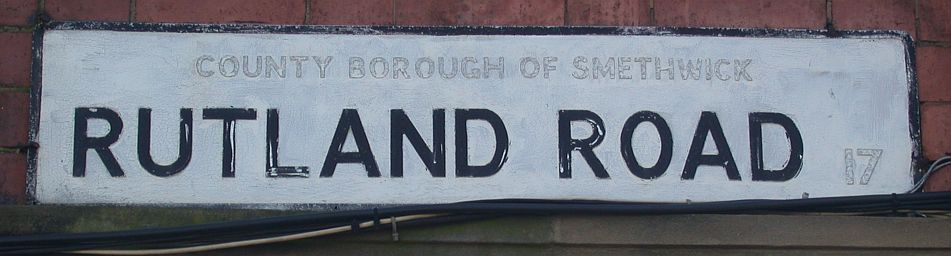
Street nameplate on Rutland Road, Smethwick in April 2007, showing painted out "County Borough" lettering.

The Local Government (County Boroughs and Adjustments) Act 1926 (16 & 17 Geo. 5 c. 38) was an act of the Parliament of the United Kingdom that amended the Local Government Act 1888 (51 & 52 Vict. c. 41), changing the process by which county boroughs could be created or extended.

The act responded to the problems caused by the fact that an increasing number of municipal boroughs were gaining county borough status as soon as they reached the requisite 50,000 population. This was leading to loss of territory by administrative counties. The consequent loss of population and rate base affected the finance of county councils.

On 16 February 1923, a royal commission had been appointed under the chairmanship of the Earl of Onslow to "inquire into the existing law and procedure relating to the extensions of county Boroughs and the creation of new County Boroughs in England and Wales, and the effect such extensions or creations on the administration of the Councils of Counties and of non-County Boroughs, Urban Districts and Rural Districts; to investigate the relations between these several local authorities; and generally to make recommendations as to their constitution, areas and functions".

The commission published its first report in 1925, and among their recommendations were that:

- All proposals to constitute a county borough should be made by private bill, and not by provisional order under the 1888 act.
- Extensions to county boroughs should be by provisional order where there were no objections, and by private bill where objections were made.
- The population requirement for the creation of a county borough should be raised to 75,000 from 50,000.
- In dealing with applications for extensions to existing county boroughs, the wishes of the inhabitants of the added areas should be taken into account, except where there were "weightier considerations of public advantage".

The 1926 act implemented most of the commission's recommendations by making the following changes:

- The Minister of Health lost the power to constitute county boroughs by provisional order.
- The corporation of a borough could not promote a bill constituting the borough into a county borough unless the population according to the last census was 75,000 or above.
- County boroughs could not apply to the Minister for a provisional order extending the borough boundaries unless they had first sent a draft of their proposals to all the councils of the administrative counties, boroughs, rural and urban districts affected. The councils had four weeks to object.
- The minister could refuse to extend the boundaries due to objections by the affected councils, or for any other reason.
- Where a provisional order to extend the municipal boundaries was refused by the Minister, the county borough corporation could promote a bill, having first informed all objectors of their intention.

The last county borough constituted under the Local Government Act 1888 (51 & 52 Vict. c. 41) was Doncaster, with a population of about 60,000, in 1927. Another county borough was not created until 1964.

The provisions of the act were later incorporated in the Local Government Act 1933 (23 & 24 Geo. 5. c. 51). The population limit for county boroughs was raised to 100,000 by the Local Government Act 1958 (6 & 7 Eliz. 2. c. 55).

== Subsequent developments ==
The whole act was repealed by section 1(1) of, and part VIII of the schedule to, the Statute Law (Repeals) Act 1975, which came into force on 13 March 1975.
