= Local Government Act 1888 =

Act of the Parliament of the United Kingdom

Local Government Act 1888 (Note: Section 102.)
- Act of Parliament
- Parliament of the United Kingdom
- Long title: An Act to amend the Laws relating to Local Government in England and Wales, and for other purposes connected therewith.
- Citation: 51 & 52 Vict. c. 41
- Introduced by: Charles Ritchie (Commons)
- Territorial extent: England and Wales (Note: Section 101.)

Dates
- Royal assent: 13 August 1888
- Commencement: 1 April 1889 (Note: Section 109.)
- Repealed: 1 January 1940 (partial)
Other legislation
Amends	Highways and Locomotives (Amendment) Act 1878; Coroners Act 1887
Repeals/revokes	Highways (Isle of Wight) Act 1881
Amended by	Lunacy Act 1890; Public Health (London) Act 1891; Local Government (Transfer of Powers) Act 1903; Costs in Criminal Cases Act 1908; County Councils Mortgages Act 1909; Representation of the People Act 1918; Territorial Army and Militia Act 1921; Representation of the People Act 1922; Rating and Valuation Act 1925; Local Government (County Boroughs and Adjustments) Act 1926; Poor Law Act 1927; Local Government Act 1933; Public Health Act 1936; Public Health (London) Act 1936; Local Government Act 1948; Gas Act 1948; Justices of the Peace Act 1949; Rivers (Prevention of Pollution) Act 1951; Customs and Excise Act 1952; Magistrates' Courts Act 1952; Local Government Act 1958; Highways Act 1959; Charities Act 1960; London Government Act 1963; Police Act 1964; Theatre Act 1968; Justices of the Peace Act 1968; Courts Act 1971; Local Government Act 1972; Statute Law (Repeals) Act 1975; Statute Law (Repeals) Act 1978; Justices of the Peace Act 1979; Statute Law (Repeals) Act 1993; Access to Justice Act 1999; Courts Act 2003; Statute Law (Repeals) Act 2004; Regulatory Reform (Game) Order 2007
Repealed by	London Government Act 1939 (partially)
Relates to	Highway Act 1835; Local Government (Scotland) Act 1889; Local Government Act 1894; Local Government (Ireland) Act 1898

Status: Partially repealed

Text of statute as originally enacted

Text of the Local Government Act 1888 as in force today (including any amendments) within the United Kingdom, from legislation.gov.uk.

The Local Government Act 1888 (51 & 52 Vict. c. 41) is an act of the Parliament of the United Kingdom which established county councils and county borough councils in England and Wales. It came into effect on 1 April 1889, except for the County of London, which came into existence on 21 March at the request of the London County Council.

== The bill ==
Following the 1886 general election, a Conservative administration headed by Lord Salisbury was formed. However the Conservatives did not have a majority of seats and had to rely on the support of the Liberal Unionist Party. As part of the price for this support the Liberal Unionists demanded that a bill be introduced placing county government under the control of elected councils, modelled on the borough councils introduced by the Municipal Corporations Act 1835.

Accordingly, the Local Government (England and Wales) Bill was introduced to the House of Commons on 19 March 1888, by the President of the Local Government Board, Charles Ritchie. The bill proposed the creation of elected county councils to take over the administrative functions of the magistrates of the Quarter Sessions courts, that ten large cities should be "counties of themselves" for the purposes of local government and that each county was to be divided into urban and rural districts, based on existing sanitary districts, governed by a district council. The county and district councils were to consist partly of directly elected "elective councillors" and partly of "selected councillors", chosen by the elective councillors in a similar manner to aldermen in municipal boroughs.

The counties to be used for local government were to be the historic counties of England and Wales. A county council was to be formed for each of the ridings of Yorkshire and the three Parts of Lincolnshire (Holland, Kesteven and Lindsey). In addition a new County of London was to be formed from the area of the Metropolitan Board of Works. This would have led to the creation of 57 county councils. The boundaries of the counties were to be those used for parliamentary purposes, adjusted to include urban sanitary districts on county borders within a single county.

The 10 cities first identified to be dealt with as separate counties were Liverpool, Birmingham, Manchester, Leeds, Sheffield, Bristol, Bradford, Nottingham, Kingston-on-Hull, and Newcastle upon Tyne.

Existing urban and rural sanitary districts, created in 1872, were to be redesignated as urban and rural districts. Urban sanitary districts that straddled counties became destined for the county with the bulk of their population as at the 1881 census, by enlarging the latter. Existing rural sanitary districts so straddling were to split on county lines to form rural districts.

== Passage ==
There were a large number of changes to the bill as it passed through parliament. The terms administrative county and county borough were introduced to designate the new areas of local government, while the "selected councillors" became "county aldermen". The government withdrew the sections relating to the creation of district councils, which were eventually brought into existence by the Local Government Act 1894 (56 & 57 Vict. c. 73).

Members of both houses made representations on behalf of counties and boroughs, and this led to an increase in the number of local authorities.

- The eastern and western divisions of Sussex became administrative counties
- The Isle of Ely was separated from Cambridgeshire
- The eastern and western divisions of Suffolk were divided for local government purposes.
- The Soke of Peterborough was separated from the remainder of Northamptonshire.

Attempts to create administrative counties for the Cinque Ports and Staffordshire Potteries were not successful.

The normal population threshold for county borough status was lowered twice, firstly to 100,000, then to 50,000. A number of smaller counties corporate were also given county borough status. Mr Ritchie conceded on 8 June:

Now that they had gone down so far in population as 50,000 there arose a question as to the admission of boroughs which had not so large a population as 50,000, but which had very peculiar claims. He referred to the counties of cities. [...] Two or three of these cities had so small a population that he did not propose to deal with them in this way. The best course was to give the names of the cities which he proposed to include. They were Exeter, Lincoln, Chester, Gloucester, Worcester, and Canterbury.

The effect of these changes was to increase the number of county boroughs from 10 to 59. With a population of around 50,000 at the 1881 census, the City of London was initially proposed for county borough status.

== County councils ==
These were subject to triennial elections, the first taking place in January 1889. Those elected in 1889 were known as "provisional" councils until coming into their powers on 1 April. The divisions of the county for the purpose of the election of county councillors became fixed, under a key definition of the act, "as electoral divisions and not wards", and "one county councillor only shall be elected for each". Following the election, the county councillors then elected county aldermen, there being one alderman for every three councillors. The London County Council had its own section of the act, prescribing two councillors to be elected for each Commons constituency, and a ratio of "not more than" one alderman to six councillors. The councillors appointed the council's "Chairman instead of mayor" and Vice Chairman, who had a one-year term of office and could be reappointed. As to natural persons section 1 of the act states every such council shall "consist of the chairman, aldermen, and councillors". The Chairman would upon (this ex officio, by virtue of office) the selecting of that person (co-option) be entitled to be a Justice of the Peace but needed take the oaths of that office "before acting as such justice", aside from the oath as to having local real estate as they had already met the equivalent requirement to become a councillor or alderman.

=== Powers ===
The powers and responsibilities transferred from the quarter sessions to the councils were enumerated in the act. These included:

- Making and levying of rates
- Borrowing of money
- Passing of county accounts
- Maintenance and construction of county buildings such as shire halls, county halls, court houses and police stations
- Licensing of places of entertainment and of race courses
- Provisions of asylums for pauper lunatics
- Establishment and maintenance of reformatory and industrial schools
- Repair of county roads and bridges (Note: The council could also declare a road a "main road" and take over its maintenance, and purchase existing bridges or build new ones.)
- Appointment, dismissal and setting of salaries for county officers
- Division of the county into polling places for parliamentary elections, and the provision of polling stations
- Control of contagious diseases in animals, and of destructive insects
- Fish conservancy and control of wild birds
- Weights and measures

County borough corporations also exercised these powers, in addition to those of a municipal borough.

== Standing joint committees ==
Control of the county police was to be exercised jointly by the quarter sessions and the county council through a standing joint committee. The committees were replaced by police authorities by the Police Act 1964.

== Counties for other purposes ==
Counties were also used as areas for administering justice and organisation of the militia. The act adjusted the boundaries for the purposes of "sheriff, lieutenant, custos rotulorum, justices, militia, coroner, or other", ensuring the judicial definitions of the counties matched groups of the administrative counties and county boroughs.

The counties of Cambridgeshire, Lincolnshire, Northamptonshire, Suffolk, Sussex and Yorkshire were undivided so far as they were one county at the passing of the act. The three ridings of Yorkshire and the three parts of Lincolnshire therefore retained their status.

County boroughs were to be administrative counties of themselves. The act provided that each county borough that had previously been part of a county (i.e., was not a county corporate) should continue to be part of that county for non-administrative purposes, notably judicial functions and lieutenancy. If a county borough did not have a separate commission of assize, oyer and terminer and jury service, or gaol delivery, it was deemed to be part of one or more adjoining counties for those purposes. The act also provided for certain financial adjustments between county boroughs and adjoining counties.

The act did not in terms affect the status of cities and towns which were counties corporate. Most of the counties corporate became county boroughs and therefore administrative counties of themselves, but while other county boroughs continued to be part of their existing counties for all other purposes, that did not apply to existing counties corporate. Those that did not become county boroughs became part of adjacent administrative counties but retained their existing judicial functions and shrievalties. The act did not change which counties, ridings and counties corporate were included in each lieutenancy area; those were already set by the Militia Act 1882 which was left in force, with the exception that if the boundaries of an administrative county changed then so too did any lieutenancy, shrieval or judicial area to match.

Whilst schedule 3 of the act identified that four of the county boroughs (Bristol, Great Yarmouth, Stockport and York) should be deemed to lie in more than one county for the purposes of the act, those purposes did not include lieutenancy, but were instead concerned with certain financial matters. For lieutenancy purposes, Bristol was solely in Gloucestershire, and York was solely in the West Riding. The county borough of Great Yarmouth did straddle Norfolk and Suffolk for judicial and lieutenancy purposes after the new county councils came into force, but only for two years; it was placed entirely in Norfolk in 1891. After 1891 Stockport was therefore the only county borough to straddle two counties (Cheshire and Lancashire) for the purposes of lieutenancy, a situation which persisted until the major reforms of 1974.

== Other provisions ==
Under section 48 of the act, all liberties and franchises, with the exception of those that became separate administrative counties, merged with the county they formed part of for parliamentary elections. The Cinque Ports, together with "the two ancient towns and their members" (which for some purposes, such as lieutenancy, were considered a distinct county), were to become part of the county where they were situated. Section 49 allowed for the creation by provisional order of a Council for the Scilly Islands to be established as a unitary authority outside the administrative county of Cornwall. This was duly formed in 1890 as the Isles of Scilly Rural District.

== List of administrative counties and county boroughs created in 1889 ==
=== England ===
Geographical county	Administrative county	County boroughs
Bedfordshire	Bedfordshire	
Berkshire	Berkshire	Reading
Buckinghamshire	Buckinghamshire	
Cambridgeshire	Cambridgeshire	
Cambridgeshire	Isle of Ely	
Cheshire	Cheshire	Birkenhead, Chester, Stockport (part)
Cornwall	Cornwall	
Cornwall	Isles of Scilly (Note: From 1890 the Scilly Isles were separated from the County of Cornwall for administrative purposes.)	
Cumberland	Cumberland	Carlisle
Derbyshire	Derbyshire	Derby
Devon	Devon	Devonport, Exeter, Plymouth
Dorset	Dorset	
Durham	Durham	Gateshead, South Shields, Sunderland
Essex	Essex	West Ham
Gloucestershire	Gloucestershire	Bristol (part), Gloucester
Hampshire	Hampshire	Portsmouth, Southampton
Hampshire	Isle of Wight (Note: From 1 April 1890 the Isle of Wight was separated from the County of Hampshire to form an administrative county.)	
Herefordshire	Herefordshire	
Hertfordshire	Hertfordshire	
Huntingdonshire	Huntingdonshire	
Kent	Kent	Canterbury
Lancashire	Lancashire	Barrow, Blackburn, Bolton, Bootle cum Linacre, Burnley, Bury, Liverpool, Manchester, Oldham, Preston, Rochdale, St Helens, Salford, Stockport (part), Wigan
Leicestershire	Leicestershire	Leicester
Lincolnshire	Lincolnshire, Parts of Holland	
Lincolnshire	Lincolnshire, Parts of Kesteven	
Lincolnshire	Lincolnshire, Parts of Lindsey	Lincoln
London	London	City of London: remained a separate county, but returned members to the London County Council, which exercised some powers within the City.
Middlesex	Middlesex	
Monmouthshire	Monmouthshire	Newport (Note: Newport became a county borough in 1891.)
Norfolk	Norfolk	Norwich, Great Yarmouth (part)
Northamptonshire	Northamptonshire	Northampton
Northamptonshire	Soke of Peterborough	
Northumberland	Northumberland	Newcastle upon Tyne
Nottinghamshire	Nottinghamshire	Nottingham
Oxfordshire	Oxfordshire	Oxford (Note: Oxford was not made a county borough directly by the 1888 Act, and so was included in the administrative county of Oxfordshire at first, but it was elevated to county borough status seven months later in November 1889.)
Rutland	Rutland	
Shropshire	Shropshire	
Somerset	Somerset	Bath, Bristol (part)
Staffordshire	Staffordshire	Hanley, Walsall, West Bromwich, Wolverhampton
Suffolk	East Suffolk	Ipswich, Great Yarmouth (part)
Suffolk	West Suffolk	
Surrey	Surrey	Croydon
Sussex	East Sussex	Brighton, Hastings
Sussex	West Sussex	
Warwickshire	Warwickshire	Birmingham, Coventry
Westmorland	Westmorland	
Wiltshire	Wiltshire	
Worcestershire	Worcestershire	Dudley, Worcester
Yorkshire	Yorkshire, East Riding	Kingston-upon-Hull, York (part)
Yorkshire	Yorkshire, North Riding	Middlesbrough, York (part)
Yorkshire	Yorkshire, West Riding	Bradford, Halifax, Huddersfield, Leeds, Sheffield, York (part)

=== Wales ===
Geographic county	Administrative county	County boroughs
Anglesey	Anglesey	
Brecknockshire	Brecknockshire	
Carnarvonshire	Carnarvonshire	
Cardiganshire	Cardiganshire	
Carmarthenshire	Carmarthenshire	
Denbighshire	Denbighshire	
Flintshire	Flintshire	
Glamorgan	Glamorgan	Cardiff; Swansea
Merioneth	Merioneth	
Montgomeryshire	Montgomeryshire	
Pembrokeshire	Pembrokeshire	
Radnorshire	Radnorshire	

== Towns on county boundaries ==
There were 37 urban sanitary districts which straddled counties prior to the act coming into force. Under Section 50 of the act, each such district was transferred in its entirety to the county which had the majority of the district's population at the 1881 census, leading to the changes set out in the table below. The Metropolitan Board of Works district, covering the urban area of London, also straddled counties prior to 1889, including parts of Middlesex, Surrey and Kent. It was not classed as an urban sanitary district, and was dealt with separately under the act by being made the new County of London.

Urban sanitary district	Counties until 1889	Administrative county or county borough from 1889
Abingdon	Berkshire; Oxfordshire	Berkshire
Banbury	Northamptonshire; Oxfordshire	Oxfordshire
Barnard Castle	Durham; Yorkshire, North Riding	Durham
Barnet	Hertfordshire; Middlesex	Hertfordshire
Bristol	Gloucestershire; Somerset	Bristol County Borough
Brynmawr	Breconshire; Monmouthshire	Breconshire
Burton upon Trent	Derbyshire; Staffordshire	Staffordshire
Cardigan	Cardiganshire; Pembrokeshire	Cardiganshire
Colwyn Bay	Caernarfonshire; Denbighshire	Denbighshire
Crowle	Lincolnshire; Yorkshire, West Riding	Lincolnshire, Parts of Lindsey
East Barnet Valley	Hertfordshire; Middlesex	Hertfordshire
Ebbw Vale	Breconshire; Monmouthshire	Monmouthshire
Filey	Yorkshire, East Riding; Yorkshire, North Riding	Yorkshire, East Riding
Great Yarmouth	Norfolk; Suffolk	Great Yarmouth County Borough
Haverhill	Essex; Suffolk	West Suffolk
Hinckley	Leicestershire; Warwickshire	Leicestershire
Malton	Yorkshire, East Riding; Yorkshire, North Riding	Yorkshire, North Riding
Market Harborough	Leicestershire; Northamptonshire	Leicestershire
Mossley	Cheshire; Lancashire; Yorkshire, West Riding	Lancashire
New Mills	Cheshire; Derbyshire	Derbyshire
Newmarket	Cambridgeshire; Suffolk	West Suffolk
Oxford	Berkshire; Oxfordshire	Oxfordshire
Peterborough	Northamptonshire; Huntingdonshire	Soke of Peterborough
Redditch	Warwickshire; Worcestershire	Worcestershire
Rhyl	Denbighshire; Flintshire	Flintshire
Rhymney	Breconshire; Monmouthshire	Monmouthshire
Stalybridge	Cheshire; Lancashire	Cheshire
Stamford	Lincolnshire; Northamptonshire	Lincolnshire, Parts of Kesteven
Stockport	Cheshire; Lancashire	Stockport County Borough
Sudbury	Essex; Suffolk	West Suffolk
Tamworth	Staffordshire; Warwickshire	Staffordshire
Thetford	Norfolk; Suffolk	Norfolk
Todmorden	Lancashire; Yorkshire, West Riding	Yorkshire, West Riding
Tredegar	Breconshire; Monmouthshire	Monmouthshire
Tunbridge Wells	Kent; Sussex	Kent
Warrington	Cheshire; Lancashire	Lancashire

Two of the county boundary changes were reverted just a few months later in September 1889. Norton, the part of the Malton district which had been transferred from the East Riding to join the rest of the district in the North Riding, was removed from the Malton district and returned to the East Riding. Startforth, the part of the Barnard Castle district which had been transferred from the North Riding to join the rest of the district in County Durham, was removed from the Barnard Castle district and returned to the North Riding.

== See also ==
- History of local government in England
- History of local government in Wales
