= Air Force Reserve Act 1950 =

Act of the Parliament of the United Kingdom

Air Force Reserve Act 1950 (Note: Section 31(1).)
- Act of Parliament
- Parliament of the United Kingdom
- Long title: An Act to consolidate certain enactments and Orders in Council relating to the air force reserve.
- Citation: 14 Geo. 6. c. 33
- Territorial extent: United Kingdom

Dates
- Royal assent: 26 October 1950
- Commencement: 1 January 1951 (Note: Section 31(2).)
- Repealed: 20 April 1980
Other legislation
Amends	See § Repealed enactments
Repeals/revokes	See § Repealed enactments
Amended by	Statute Law Revision Act 1953
Repealed by	Revision of the Army and Air Force Acts (Transitional Provisions) Act 1955; Mental Health (Scotland) Act 1960; South Africa Act 1962; Defence (Transfer of Functions) (No. 1) Order 1964; Armed Forces Act 1971; Northern Ireland (Modification of Enactments—No. 1) Order 1973; Statute Law (Repeals) Act 1975; Statute Law (Repeals) Act 1976; Statute Law (Repeals) Act 1977; Reserve Forces Act 1980
Relates to	Army Reserve Act 1950

Status: Repealed

Text of statute as originally enacted

The Air Force Reserve Act 1950 (14 Geo. 6. c. 33) was an act of the Parliament of the United Kingdom that consolidated certain enactments and orders in council relating to the air force reserve.

The Army Reserve Act 1950 (14 Geo. 6. c. 32) made similar provisions for the army reserve.

== Provisions ==
=== Repealed enactments ===
Sections 28(1) and 28(2) of the act repealed 9 enactments, listed in parts I and II of the third schedule to the act, respectively. Section 28(3) of the act revoked 5 orders in council, listed in part III of the third schedule.

Part I - repeal of enactments as applicable to air force reserve by orders in council
Citation	Short title	Order in Council applying enactment
45 & 46 Vict. c. 48	Reserve Forces Act 1882	The Air Force Reserve Order, 1924; the Air Force Reserve (Pilots and Observers) Order, 1934
61 & 62 Vict. c. 9	Reserve Forces and Militia Act 1898	The Air Force Reserve (Application of Enactments) (No. 1) Order, 1918
62 & 63 Vict. c. 40	Reserve Forces Act 1899	The Air Force Reserve (Application of Enactments) (No. 1) Order, 1918
6 Edw. 7. c. 11	Reserve Forces Act 1906	The Air Force Reserve (Application of Enactments) (No. 1) Order, 1918
7 Edw. 7. c. 9	Territorial and Reserve Forces Act 1907, except section thirty-six thereof	The Air Force Reserve Order, 1924
12, 13 & 14 Geo. 6. c. 96	Auxiliary and Reserve Forces Act 1949	The Air Force Reserve Order, 1950

Part II - other enactments repealed
Citation	Short title	Extent of repeal
7 & 8 Geo. 5. c. 51	Air Force (Constitution) Act 1917	In section six, subsection (1), so far as it relates to the raising and maintenance of an air force reserve.
N/A	The Air Force Act	In section eighty-eight, subsection (4).
14 & 15 Geo. 5. c. 15	Auxiliary Air Force and Air Force Reserve Act 1924	Section five, so far as it relates to the air force reserve.

Part III - orders in council repealed
Citation	Short title	Extent of repeal
SR&O 1918/1064	Air Force Reserve Application of Enactments) (No. 1) Order 1918	The whole order, except so far as it applies the Reserve Forces Act, 1890 to the air force reserve.
SR&O 1924/1213	Air Force Reserve Order 1924	The whole order, except so far as it applies section thirty-six of the Territorial and Reserve Forces Act, 1907 to the air force reserve.
SR&O 1934/692	Air Force Reserve (Pilots and Observers) Order 1934	The whole order.
SI 1949/1844	National Service (Adaptation of Enactments) (Military and Air Forces) Order 1949	In Part II of the Schedule to e Order, paragraphs 6 to 10.
SI 1950/835	Air Force Reserve Order 1950	The whole order.

== Subsequent developments ==
Section 24 of the act was repealed by section 1(1) of, and part XI of the schedule to, the Statute Law (Repeals) Act 1975, which came into force on 13 March 1975.

Section 29 of the act act repealed by section 1(1) of, and part IV of schedule 1 to, the Statute Law (Repeals) Act 1976, which came into force on 27 May 1976.

The whole act was repealed by section 157(1)(b) of, and schedule 10 to, the Reserve Forces Act 1980 (1980 c. 9), which came into force on 20 April 1980.
