= Reserve Forces Act 1882 =

Act of the Parliament of the United Kingdom

Reserve Forces Act 1882 (Note: Section 1.)
- Act of Parliament
- Parliament of the United Kingdom
- Long title: An Act to consolidate the Acts relating to the Reserve Forces.
- Citation: 45 & 46 Vict. c. 48
- Territorial extent: United Kingdom

Dates
- Royal assent: 18 August 1882
- Commencement: 1 January 1883 (Note: Section 2.)
- Repealed: 1 January 1951 (Note: Section 30(2) of the Army Reserve Act 1950.)
Other legislation
Amends	See § Repealed enactments
Repeals/revokes	See § Repealed enactments
Amended by	Reserve Forces and Militia Act 1898; Reserve Forces Act 1906; Territorial and Reserve Forces Act 1907; Statute Law Revision Act 1950
Repealed by	Statute Law Revision Act 1898; Reserve Forces Act 1900; Territorial Army and Militia Act 1921; Army Reserve Act 1950; Air Force Reserve Act 1950
Relates to	Militia Act 1882

Status: Repealed

Text of statute as originally enacted

The Reserve Forces Act 1882 (45 & 46 Vict. c. 48) was an act of the Parliament of the United Kingdom that consolidated enactments related to the army reserve and militia reserve in the United Kingdom.

== Provisions ==
=== Repealed enactments ===
Section 29 of the act repealed 10 enactments, listed in the schedule to the act.

Citation	Short title	Description	Extent of repeal
30 & 31 Vict. c. 110	Reserve Force Act 1867	The Reserve Force Act, 1867.	The whole act.
30 & 31 Vict. c. 111	Militia Reserve Act 1867	The Militia Reserve Act, 1867.	The whole act.
33 & 34 Vict. c. 67	Army Enlistment Act 1870	The Army Enlistment Act, 1870.	Sections fourteen and fifteen, and section twenty, except so far as it relates to the militia, yeomanry, or volunteers.
34 & 35 Vict. c. 86	Regulation of the Forces Act 1871	The Regulation of the Forces Act, 1871.	So much of sections seven and nineteen as relates to the army reserve or the militia reserve.
36 & 37 Vict. c. 68	Militia (Lands and Buildings) Act 1873	An Act for extending the Period of Service in the Militia; and for other purposes.	Section six.
41 & 42 Vict. c. 10	Mutiny Act 1878	An Act for punishing Mutiny and Desertion, and for the better Payment of the Army and their Quarters.	Sections forty-two, forty-seven, forty-eight, and one hundred and nine.
42 & 43 Vict. c. 32	Army Discipline and Regulation (Commencement) Act 1879	The Army Discipline and Regulation (Commencement) Act, 1879.	Section five, from "Any reference in the Reserve Force" to the end of the section, and so much of the rest of the section as relates to the reserve forces or keeps in force any portion of the Army Mutiny Act relating to the reserve forces.
42 & 43 Vict. c. 33	Army Discipline and Regulation Act 1879	The Army Discipline and Regulation Act, 1879.	So much as is unrepealed.
44 & 45 Vict. c. 57	Regulation of the Forces Act 1881	The Regulation of the Forces Act, 1881.	Sections ten to thirteen and forty-five, and so much of section fifty-three as relates to the reserve forces.
44 & 45 Vict. c. 58	Army Act 1881	The Army Act, 1881.	Section one hundred and sixty-three, from "evidence of the delivery" to "knowledge of such man" (being paragraph (b) of sub-section one); section one hundred and ninety, from "the expression the army reserve force" to "Militia Reserve Act, 1867, and any Act amending the same"; and section one hundred and ninety-three from "so much of the Army Discipline and Regulation Act, 1879," to the end of the section.

== Subsequent developments ==
The following enactments were repealed by section 1(1) of, and the first schedule to, the Statute Law Revision Act 1950 (14 Geo. 6. c. 6), which came into force on 23 May 1950.

- Section 28 (Definitions) the words " not holding an honorary commission."
- Section twenty-nine the last paragraph.

The whole act, so far as it remained in force, was repealed by section 29(1) of, and the third schedule to, the Army Reserve Act 1950 (14 Geo. 6. c. 32), which came into force on 1 January 1951, and section 28(1) of, and part I of schedule 3 to, the Air Force Reserve Act 1950 (c. 33), which came into force on 1 January 1951.
