= List of acts of the 1st session of the 5th Parliament of the United Kingdom =

This is a complete list of acts of the 1st session of the 2nd Parliament of the United Kingdom which had regnal year 53 Geo. 3. This session met from 24 November 1812 until 22 July 1813.

== 1812 ==
The first session of the 5th Parliament of the United Kingdom, which met from 24 November 1812 until 22 July 1813.

This session was also traditionally cited as 53 G. 3.

=== Public general acts ===
Short title	Citation	Royal assent
Long title
Use of Sugar in Brewing (Great Britain) (No. 2) Act 1812 (repealed)	53 Geo. 3. c. 1	16 December 1812
An Act to continue until the First Day of October One thousand eight hundred and thirteen, an Act of the last Session of Parliament, (Note: Use of Sugar in Brewing (Great Britain) Act 1812 (52 Geo. 3. c. 65)) for allowing the Use of Sugar in Brewing Beer in Great Britain. (Repealed by Statute Law Revision Act 1873 (36 & 37 Vict. c. 91))
Importation, etc. (No. 2) Act 1812 (repealed)	53 Geo. 3. c. 2	16 December 1812
An Act to continue until the First Day of October One thousand eight hundred and thirteen, and amend an Act of the last Session of Parliament (Note: Manufacture of Starch from Wheat, etc. Act 1812 (52 Geo. 3. c. 127)) for prohibiting the making of Starch, Hair Powder and Blue, from Wheat and other Articles of Food; and for suspending Part of the Duties now payable on the Importation into Great Britain of Starch. (Repealed by Making of Starch Act 1813 (53 Geo. 3. c. 23))
Intercourse Between Jamaica and Saint Domingo Act 1812 (repealed)	53 Geo. 3. c. 3	22 December 1812
An Act to amend an Act of the last Session of Parliament, (Note: Jamaica and Saint Domingo Act 1812 (52 Geo. 3. c. 35)) for prohibiting the Intercourse between the Islands of Jamaica and Saint Domingo. (Repealed by Customs Law Repeal Act 1825 (6 Geo. 4. c. 105))
Purchase of Estate for Duke of Wellington Act 1812	53 Geo. 3. c. 4	22 December 1812
An Act for granting a Sum of Money for purchasing an Estate for the Marquis of Wellington and his Heirs, in Consideration of the eminent and signal Services performed by the said Marquis of Wellington to His Majesty and the Public.
Gold Currency Act 1812 (repealed)	53 Geo. 3. c. 5	22 December 1812
An Act to continue, until the Twenty fifth Day of March One thousand eight hundred and fourteen, an Act of the last Session of Parliament, (Note: Gold Currency, etc. Act 1812 (52 Geo. 3. c. 50)) for making more effectual Provision for preventing the Current Gold Coin of the Realm from being paid or accepted for a greater Value than the Current Value of such Coin; for preventing any Note or Bill of the Governor and Company of the Bank of England, or of the Governor and Company of the Bank of Ireland, from being received for any smaller Sum than the Sum therein specified; and for staying Proceedings upon any Distress by Tender of such Notes. (Repealed by Statute Law Revision Act 1873 (36 & 37 Vict. c. 91))
Insolvent Debtors Relief (England) (No. 3) Act 1812 (repealed)	53 Geo. 3. c. 6	22 December 1812
An Act to explain and amend an Act passed in the Fifty second Year of the Reign of His present Majesty, intituled "An Act for the Relief of certain Insolvent Debtors in England;" (Note: Insolvent Debtors Relief (England) (No. 2) Act 1812 (52 Geo. 3. c. 165)) and to enlarge the Powers of the same in certain cases. (Repealed by Statute Law Revision Act 1873 (36 & 37 Vict. c. 91))
Distillation from Corn Prohibition, etc. Act 1812 (repealed)	53 Geo. 3. c. 7	22 December 1812
An Act to continue, until the Thirty-first Day of December One thousand eight hundred and thirteen, an Act made in the Forty ninth Year of His present Majesty, (Note: Distillation of Spirits Act 1809 (49 Geo. 3. c. 7)) to prohibit the Distillation of Spirits from Corn or Grain in the United Kingdom, and another Act made in the Forty ninth Year of His present Majesty, (Note: Importation Act 1809 (49 Geo. 3. c. 8)) to suspend the Importation of British or Irish-made Spirits into Great Britain and Ireland respectively, and to continue the Duties on Worts or Wash made from Sugar in Great Britain, and the Duties on Spirits made from Sugar in Ireland. (Repealed by Statute Law Revision Act 1873 (36 & 37 Vict. c. 91))
Importation and Exportation (No. 3) Act 1812 (repealed)	53 Geo. 3. c. 8	22 December 1812
An Act for repealing the Duties and Drawbacks on the Importation into and Exportation from Great Britain of Spanish Red Wine, and for granting others in lieu thereof. (Repealed by Statute Law Revision Act 1861 (24 & 25 Vict. c. 101))
Duty on Malt Act 1812 (repealed)	53 Geo. 3. c. 9	22 December 1812
An Act to alter and amend an Act, of the Fifty-second Year of His present Majesty, (Note: Excise (No. 4) Act 1812 (52 Geo. 3. c. 128)) for better securing the Duties on Malt. (Repealed by Statute Law Revision Act 1861 (24 & 25 Vict. c. 101))
Duty on Rice Act 1812 (repealed)	53 Geo. 3. c. 10	22 December 1812
An Act for charging an additional Duty on Rice imported into Great Britain. (Repealed by Statute Law Revision Act 1861 (24 & 25 Vict. c. 101))
Drawback on Chocolate Act 1812 (repealed)	53 Geo. 3. c. 11	22 December 1812
An Act for allowing an additional Drawback on Chocolate exported. (Repealed by Statute Law Revision Act 1861 (24 & 25 Vict. c. 101))
Indemnity (Order in Council West Indies Importation) Act 1812 (repealed)	53 Geo. 3. c. 12	22 December 1812
An Act for indemnifying such Persons as have advised or acted under an Order in Council for allowing the Importation of certain Articles into the West Indies, and for permitting such Importation until the Thirtieth Day of June One thousand eight hundred and thirteen. (Repealed by Statute Law Revision Act 1873 (36 & 37 Vict. c. 91))
Postage (No. 2) Act 1812 (repealed)	53 Geo. 3. c. 13	22 December 1812
An Act for authorizing the Assistant Secretary to the Postmaster General to send and receive Letters and Packets free from the Duty on Postage. (Repealed by Post Office (Repeal of Laws) Act 1837 (7 Will. 4 & 1 Vict. c. 32))
Care of King's Estate During his Illness Act 1812 (repealed)	53 Geo. 3. c. 14	22 December 1812
An Act to explain so much of Two Acts, (Note: Care of King During his Illness, etc. Act 1811 (51 Geo. 3. c. 1)) (Note: Royal Household, etc. Act 1812 (52 Geo. 3. c. 8)) for regulating His Majesty's Household and other Purposes, as relates to the Powers of the Commissioners for the Care and Management of His Majesty's Real and Personal Estate. (Repealed by Statute Law Revision Act 1873 (36 & 37 Vict. c. 91))
Duties on Malt, etc. (No. 2) Act 1812 (repealed)	53 Geo. 3. c. 15	22 December 1812
An Act for continuing to His Majesty certain Duties on Malt, Sugar, Tobacco and Snuff, in Great Britain; and on Pensions, Offices and Personal Estates in England; for the Service of the Year One thousand eight hundred and thirteen. (Repealed by Statute Law Revision Act 1873 (36 & 37 Vict. c. 91))
Exchequer Bills (No. 6) Act 1812 (repealed)	53 Geo. 3. c. 16	22 December 1812
An Act for raising the Sum of Ten millions five hundred thousand Pounds, by Exchequer Bills, for the Service Great Britain for the Year One thousand eight hundred and thirteen. (Repealed by Statute Law Revision Act 1873 (36 & 37 Vict. c. 91))

=== Sources ===
- The Statutes of the United Kingdom of Great Britain and Ireland. 53 George III. 1813. Joseph Butterworth. 1813 – via Google Books.
- Journal of the House of Commons. Vol. 68. London: His Majesty's Stationery Office. pp. 3–675.
- Chronological Table of and Index to the Statutes. Vol. 1: To the End of the Session 59 Vict. Sess. 2 (1895) (13th ed.). London: Her Majesty's Stationery Office. 1896. pp. 202–206 – via Google Books.

== 1813 ==
Continuing the first session of the 5th Parliament of the United Kingdom, which met from 24 November 1812 until 22 July 1813.

This session was also traditionally cited as 53 G. 3.

=== Public general acts ===
Short title	Citation	Royal assent
Long title
Mutiny Act 1813 (repealed)	53 Geo. 3. c. 17	23 March 1813
An Act for punishing Mutiny and Desertion; and for the better Payment of the Army and their Quarters. (Repealed by Statute Law Revision Act 1873 (36 & 37 Vict. c. 91))
Drawback on Coals Act 1813	53 Geo. 3. c. 18	23 March 1813
An Act for allowing a Drawback of the Duty on Coals used in Fire or Steam Engines for raising Ores in the Counties of Devon and Cornwall.
Issue, etc., of Gold and Silver Tokens Act 1813 (repealed)	53 Geo. 3. c. 19	23 March 1813
An Act to amend an Act of the last Session of Parliament, (Note: Tokens Act 1812 (52 Geo. 3. c. 157)) to prevent the issuing and circulating of Pieces of Gold and Silver or other Metal usually called Tokens, except such as are issued by the Banks of England and Ireland respectively. (Repealed by Statute Law Revision Act 1861 (24 & 25 Vict. c. 101))
Militia (Great Britain) Act 1813 (repealed)	53 Geo. 3. c. 20	23 March 1813
An Act to allow a limited Proportion of the Corps of Miners to inlist into the Regular Forces. (Repealed by Statute Law Revision Act 1861 (24 & 25 Vict. c. 101))
Prisoners for Certain Debts, etc. Act 1813 (repealed)	53 Geo. 3. c. 21	23 March 1813
An Act for authorizing the Commissioners of Customs and Excise to make an Allowance for the necessary Subsistence of poor Persons confined for Debts or Penalties sued for under their Orders. (Repealed by Statute Law Revision Act 1861 (24 & 25 Vict. c. 101))
Salt Duties Act 1813 (repealed)	53 Geo. 3. c. 22	23 March 1813
An Act for empowering the Commissioners of Excise to sell Salt seized Duty free, either for Exportation or for curing Fish, and to reward the seizing Officer. (Repealed by Statute Law Revision Act 1861 (24 & 25 Vict. c. 101))
Making of Starch Act 1813 (repealed)	53 Geo. 3. c. 23	23 March 1813
An Act to repeal so much of an Act of this Session (Note: Importation, etc. (No. 2) Act 1812 (53 Geo. 3. c. 2)) as continues the Prohibition of the making of Starch from Wheat and other Articles of Food. (Repealed by Statute Law Revision Act 1873 (36 & 37 Vict. c. 91))
Administration of Justice Act 1813 (repealed)	53 Geo. 3. c. 24	23 March 1813
An Act to facilitate the Administration of Justice. (Repealed by Civil Procedure Acts Repeal Act 1879 (42 & 43 Vict. c. 59))
Marine Mutiny Act 1813 (repealed)	53 Geo. 3. c. 25	23 March 1813
An Act for the regulating of His Majesty's Royal Marine Forces while on Shore. (Repealed by Statute Law Revision Act 1873 (36 & 37 Vict. c. 91))
Exchequer Bills Act 1813 (repealed)	53 Geo. 3. c. 26	1 April 1813
An Act for raising the Sum of Five Millions, by Exchequer Bills, for the Service of Great Britain, for the Year One thousand eight hundred and thirteen. (Repealed by Statute Law Revision Act 1873 (36 & 37 Vict. c. 91))
Exchequer Bills (No. 2) Act 1813 (repealed)	53 Geo. 3. c. 27	1 April 1813
An Act for raising the Sum of One million five hundred thousand Pounds, by Exchequer Bills, for the Service of Great Britain, for the Year One thousand eight hundred and thirteen. (Repealed by Statute Law Revision Act 1873 (36 & 37 Vict. c. 91))
Local Militia (England) Act 1813 (repealed)	53 Geo. 3. c. 28	1 April 1813
An Act to explain and amend an Act, passed in the last Session of Parliament, (Note: Local Militia (England) Act 1812 (52 Geo. 3. c. 38)) for amending the Laws relating to the Local Militia in England. (Repealed by Territorial Army and Militia Act 1921 (11 & 12 Geo. 5. c. 37))
Militia (Scotland) Act 1813 (repealed)	53 Geo. 3. c. 29	1 April 1813
An Act to explain and amend an Act passed in the last Session of Parliament, intituled "An Act for amending the Laws relating to the Local Militia in Scotland." (Note: Local Militia (Scotland) Act 1812 (52 Geo. 3. c. 68)) (Repealed by Territorial Army and Militia Act 1921 (11 & 12 Geo. 5. c. 37))
Exportation Act 1813 (repealed)	53 Geo. 3. c. 30	1 April 1813
An Act to allow a Bounty on the Exportation of the Manufactures of Refuse or Waste Silk. (Repealed by Statute Law Revision Act 1861 (24 & 25 Vict. c. 101))
Exportation (No. 2) Act 1813 (repealed)	53 Geo. 3. c. 31	1 April 1813
An Act for further continuing, until the Twenty fifth Day of March One thousand eight hundred and fourteen, certain Bounties and Drawbacks on the Exportation of Sugar from Great Britain; and for suspending the Countervailing Duties and Bounties on Sugar, when the Duties imposed by an Act of the Forty ninth Year of His present Majesty (Note: Customs (No. 3) Act 1809 (49 Geo. 3. c. 98)) shall be suspended. (Repealed by Statute Law Revision Act 1873 (36 & 37 Vict. c. 91))
Exportation (No. 3) Act 1813 (repealed)	53 Geo. 3. c. 32	1 April 1813
An Act to continue, until the Twenty fifth Day of March One thousand eight hundred and fourteen, an Act (Note: Drawbacks (Ireland) Act 1807 (47 Geo. 3 Sess. 1. c. 19)) for regulating the Drawbacks and Bounties on the Exportation of Sugar from Ireland. (Repealed by Statute Law Revision Act 1873 (36 & 37 Vict. c. 91))
Customs Act 1813 (repealed)	53 Geo. 3. c. 33	15 April 1813
An Act for granting certain additional Duties of Customs imported into, and exported from Great Britain. (Repealed by Statute Law Revision Act 1861 (24 & 25 Vict. c. 101))
Importation Act 1813 (repealed)	53 Geo. 3. c. 34	15 April 1813
An Act for granting to His Majesty additional Duties of Excise in Great Britain, on Tobacco and Snuff, and on French Wines. (Repealed by Statute Law Revision Act 1861 (24 & 25 Vict. c. 101))
National Debt Act 1813 (repealed)	53 Geo. 3. c. 35	15 April 1813
An Act to alter and amend several Acts passed in His present Majesty's Reign, relating to the Redemption of the National Debt; and for making further Provisions in respect thereof. (Repealed by Statute Law Revision Act 1873 (36 & 37 Vict. c. 91))
Passenger Vessels Act 1813	53 Geo. 3. c. 36	15 April 1813
An Act to amend an Act, passed in the Forty third Year of His present Majesty, (Note: Passenger Vessels Act 1803 (43 Geo. 3. c. 56)) for regulating the Vessels carrying Passengers to His Majesty's Plantations and Settlements Abroad.
Importation (No. 2) Act 1813	53 Geo. 3. c. 37	15 April 1813
An Act to amend an Act of the Twenty eighth Year of His present Majesty, (Note: Importation Act 1788 (28 Geo. 3. c. 39)) for allowing the Importation of Rum or other Spirits from His Majesty's Colonies or Plantations in the West Indies, into the Province of Quebec without Payment of Duty.
Exportation (No. 4) Act 1813 (repealed)	53 Geo. 3. c. 38	15 April 1813
An Act for regulating the Exportation of Corn and other Articles to Newfoundland, Nova Scotia, the Bay of Chaleur, and the Coast of Labrador. (Repealed by Statute Law Revision Act 1861 (24 & 25 Vict. c. 101))
Transportation Act 1813 (repealed)	53 Geo. 3. c. 39	15 April 1813
An Act to continue, until the Twenty fifth Day of March One thousand eight hundred and fourteen, several Laws relating to the Transportation of Felons and other Offenders to temporary Places of Confinement in England and Scotland. (Repealed by Statute Law Revision Act 1873 (36 & 37 Vict. c. 91))
Wages, etc., of Artificers, etc. Act 1813 (repealed)	53 Geo. 3. c. 40	15 April 1813
An Act to repeal so much of several Acts passed in England and Scotland respectively, as empowers Justices of the Peace to rate Wages, or set Prices of Work, for Artificers, Labourers or Craftsmen. (Repealed by Statute Law Revision Act 1873 (36 & 37 Vict. c. 91))
National Debt (No. 2) Act 1813 (repealed)	53 Geo. 3. c. 41	1 May 1813
An Act for granting Annuities to satisfy certain Exchequer Bills; and for raising a Sum of Money by Debentures for the Service of Great Britain. (Repealed by Statute Law Revision Act 1870 (33 & 34 Vict. c. 69))
Exchequer Bills (No. 3) Act 1813 (repealed)	53 Geo. 3. c. 42	1 May 1813
An Act to enable the Commissioners of His Majesty's Treasury to issue Exchequer Bills, on the Credit of such Aids or Supplies as have been or shall be granted by Parliament for the Service of Great Britain for the Year One thousand eight hundred and thirteen. (Repealed by Statute Law Revision Act 1873 (36 & 37 Vict. c. 91))
Quartering of Soldiers Act 1813 (repealed)	53 Geo. 3. c. 43	1 May 1813
An Act for increasing the Rates of Subsistence to be paid to Innkeepers and others on quartering Soldiers. (Repealed by Statute Law Revision Act 1873 (36 & 37 Vict. c. 91))
Drawback on Wines Act 1813 (repealed)	53 Geo. 3. c. 44	21 May 1813
An Act for allowing a Drawback of the Duties upon Wines consumed by Officers of the Royal Marines serving on board His Majesty's Ships. (Repealed by Customs Law Repeal Act 1825 (6 Geo. 4. c. 105))
Exportation (No. 5) Act 1813 (repealed)	53 Geo. 3. c. 45	21 May 1813
An Act for repealing Two Acts which prohibit the Exportation of Brass and other Metal from England. (Repealed by Statute Law Revision Act 1873 (36 & 37 Vict. c. 91))
Butter Trade (Ireland) Act 1813 (repealed)	53 Geo. 3. c. 46	21 May 1813
An Act for the further Regulation of the Butter Trade of Ireland. (Repealed by Statute Law Revision Act 1873 (36 & 37 Vict. c. 91))
Customs (No. 2) Act 1813 (repealed)	53 Geo. 3. c. 47	21 May 1813
An Act to empower the Officers of His Majesty's Customs to take Bonds from Persons under Twenty one Years of Age, serving as Mates on board of Merchant Vessels. (Repealed by Customs Law Repeal Act 1825 (6 Geo. 4. c. 105))
Local Militia (Ireland) Act 1813	53 Geo. 3. c. 48	21 May 1813
An Act to amend the Laws for raising and training the Militia of Ireland.
Parliamentary Elections Act 1813	53 Geo. 3. c. 49	21 May 1813
An Act to explain and amend an Act, passed in the Seventh and Eight Years of the Reign of the late King William, (Note: Parliamentary Elections Act 1695 (7 & 8 Will. 3. c. 25)) as far as relates to the splitting and dividing the Interest in Houses and Lands among several Persons to enable them to vote at Elections of Members to serve in Parliament.
Bermuda Trade Act 1813	53 Geo. 3. c. 50	21 May 1813
An Act for further allowing the Importation and Exportation of certain Articles at the Island of Bermuda.
Officers' Widows' Pensions Act 1813	53 Geo. 3. c. 51	21 May 1813
An Act to relieve the Widows of Military Officers from the Payment of Stamp Duties on the Receipt of their Pensions in Ireland.
Distillation, etc., of Spirits (Ireland) Act 1813 (repealed)	53 Geo. 3. c. 52	21 May 1813
An Act to encourage the Distillation of Spirits from Sugar in Ireland, and to permit the Warehousing of such Spirits without Payment of the Duty of Excise chargeable thereon. (Repealed by Statute Law Revision Act 1861 (24 & 25 Vict. c. 101))
National Debt (No. 3) Act 1813 (repealed)	53 Geo. 3. c. 53	21 May 1813
An Act for raising a further Sum of Money by Debentures for the Service of Great Britain; and for granting Annuities to satisfy certain Exchequer Bills; and for amending an Act of this Session of Parliament (Note: National Debt (No. 2) Act 1813 (53 Geo. 3. c. 41)) for granting Annuities to satisfy certain Exchequer Bills; and for raising a Sum of Money by Debentures. (Repealed by Statute Law Revision Act 1870 (33 & 34 Vict. c. 69))
Battle-axe Guards (Ireland) Act 1813 (repealed)	53 Geo. 3. c. 54	21 May 1813
An Act to amend an Act made in the Forty ninth Year of His Majesty's Reign, intituled "An Act for the further Prevention of the Sale and Brokerage of Offices." (Note: Sale of Offices Act 1809 (49 Geo. 3. c. 126)) (Repealed by Statute Law Revision Act 1873 (36 & 37 Vict. c. 91))
Importation and Exportation Act 1813	53 Geo. 3. c. 55	3 June 1813
An Act to continue until the Fifth Day of July One thousand eight hundred and fourteen, and to amend several Acts for granting certain Rates and Duties, and for allowing certain Drawbacks and Bounties on Goods, Wares and Merchandize imported into and exported from Ireland; and to grant until the said Fifth Day of July One thousand eight hundred and fourteen, certain new and additional Duties on the Importation, and to allow Drawbacks on the Exportation of certain Goods, Wares and Merchandize into and from Ireland.
Excise Act 1813 (repealed)	53 Geo. 3. c. 56	24 June 1813
An Act to grant to His Majesty certain Duties of Excise in Ireland on Malt. (Repealed by Statute Law Revision Act 1861 (24 & 25 Vict. c. 101))
Excise (No. 2) Act 1813 (repealed)	53 Geo. 3. c. 57	24 June 1813
An Act to grant to His Majesty certain Duties of Excise in Ireland on Tobacco. (Repealed by Statute Law Revision Act 1861 (24 & 25 Vict. c. 101))
Postage Act 1813	53 Geo. 3. c. 58	3 June 1813
An Act to repeal certain Rates and Duties upon Letters and Packets fent by the Post from or to Dublin, to or from the several Post Towns in Ireland, and to grant other Rates and Duties in lieu thereof; and to make further Regulations for securing the Duties on Letters and Packets fent by the Post in Ireland.
Duties on Carriages, etc. (Ireland) Act 1813 (repealed)	53 Geo. 3. c. 59	3 June 1813
An Act to grant to His Majesty certain Duties and Taxes in Ireland, in respect of Carriages, Horses, Male Servants, and Windows, in lieu of former Duties and Taxes in respect of the like Articles. (Repealed by Statute Law Revision Act 1861 (24 & 25 Vict. c. 101))
Duties on Hides, etc. (Ireland) Act 1813 (repealed)	53 Geo. 3. c. 60	3 June 1813
An Act for the better Collection of the Duties on Hides and Skins tanned or dressed in Oil, and on Vellum and Parchment made in Ireland; and for preventing Frauds on His Majesty's Revenue therein. (Repealed by Statute Law Revision Act 1861 (24 & 25 Vict. c. 101))
National Debt (No. 4) Act 1813 (repealed)	53 Geo. 3. c. 61	3 June 1813
An Act for raising the Sum of Two Millions by way of Annuities and Treasury Bills for the Service of Ireland. (Repealed by Statute Law Revision Act 1870 (33 & 34 Vict. c. 69))
Duties on Sugar Act 1813 (repealed)	53 Geo. 3. c. 62	3 June 1813
An Act to permit the Entry for Home Consumption of Sugar the Produce or Manufacture of Martinique, Mariegalante, Guaduloupe, Saint Eustatia, Saint Martin and Saba, at a lower Rate of Duty than is payable upon Sugar not of the British Plantations. (Repealed by Statute Law Revision Act 1861 (24 & 25 Vict. c. 101))
American Prizes Act 1813 (repealed)	53 Geo. 3. c. 63	3 June 1813
An Act to extend Two Acts of the Forty fifth (Note: Manning of the Navy Act 1805 (45 Geo. 3. c. 72)) and Forty ninth (Note: Prize Money Act 1809 (49 Geo. 3. c. 123)) Years of His present Majesty to American Prizes. (Repealed by Naval Prize Acts Repeal Act 1864 (27 & 28 Vict. c. 23))
Court of Session Act 1813 (repealed)	53 Geo. 3. c. 64	3 June 1813
An Act for the better Regulation of the Court of Session in Scotland. (Repealed by Court of Session Act 1988 (c. 36))
Payment of Creditors (Scotland) Act 1813 (repealed)	53 Geo. 3. c. 65	3 June 1813
An Act for continuing, until the Twenty fifth Day of July One thousand eight hundred and fourteen, an Act made in the Thirty third Year of His present Majesty, (Note: Payment of Creditors (Scotland) Act 1793 (33 Geo. 3. c. 74)) for rendering the Payment of Creditors more equal and expeditious in Scotland. (Repealed by Statute Law Revision Act 1873 (36 & 37 Vict. c. 91))
Sites of Parish Churches (Ireland) Act 1813	53 Geo. 3. c. 66	3 June 1813
An Act for explaining and clearing up certain Doubts respecting the Scites of Parish Churches within Ireland.
Exportation and Importation Act 1813 (repealed)	53 Geo. 3. c. 67	3 June 1813
An Act for empowering His Majesty to authorize the Importation and Exportation of certain Articles into and from the West Indies, South America and Newfoundland, until Six Weeks after the Commencement of the next Session of Parliament. (Repealed by Statute Law Revision Act 1873 (36 & 37 Vict. c. 91))
Postage, etc. Act 1813	53 Geo. 3. c. 68	3 June 1813
An Act to repeal the Exemption from Toll granted for or in respect of Carriages with more than Two Wheels, carrying the Mail in Scotland; and for granting a Rate for Postage, as an Indemnity for the Loss which may arise to the Revenue of the Post Office from the Payment of such Tolls.
National Debt (No. 5) Act 1813 (repealed)	53 Geo. 3. c. 69	22 June 1813
An Act for raising the Sum of Twenty seven Millions by way of Annuities. (Repealed by Statute Law Revision Act 1870 (33 & 34 Vict. c. 69))
Glass, etc., Duties Act 1813 (repealed)	53 Geo. 3. c. 70	22 June 1813
An Act to authorize the Sellers of Glass, Hides, Tobacco and Snuff, to charge the additional Duties on any such Articles ordered before but not delivered until after the Fifth Day of July One thousand eight hundred and twelve. (Repealed by Statute Law Revision Act 1873 (36 & 37 Vict. c. 91))
Controverted Elections Act 1813	53 Geo. 3. c. 71	22 June 1813
An Act for amending and rendering more effectual the Laws for the Trials of Controverted Elections and Returns of Members to serve in Parliament.
Stipendiary Magistrate, Manchester Act 1813	53 Geo. 3. c. 72	22 June 1813
An Act for the more effectual Administration of the Office of a Justice of the Peace within the Townships of Manchester and Salford, in the Hundred of Salford, in the County Palatine of Lancaster; and to provide by Means of a Rate on the said Townships and otherwise, a competent Salary to a Justice of the Peace acting within the said Townships; and to enable the Constables of Manchester and Salford to take Recognizances in certain cases.
Duties, etc., on Tobacco (Ireland) Act 1813 (repealed)	53 Geo. 3. c. 73	2 July 1813
An Act to declare that the Duties of Excise and Drawbacks, granted and made payable in Ireland on Tobacco by an Act of this Session, (Note: Excise (No. 2) Act 1813 (53 Geo. 3. c. 57)) are payable according to the Amount thereof in British Currency. (Repealed by Statute Law Revision Act 1873 (36 & 37 Vict. c. 91))
Duty on Malt (Ireland) Act 1813 (repealed)	53 Geo. 3. c. 74	2 July 1813
An Act to provide for the better Collection of the Duty on Malt made in Ireland. (Repealed by Statute Law Revision Act 1873 (36 & 37 Vict. c. 91))
Cotton Trade (Ireland) Act 1813 (repealed)	53 Geo. 3. c. 75	2 July 1813
An Act for the better Regulation of the Cotton Trade in Ireland. (Repealed by Masters and Workmen Arbitration Act 1824 (5 Geo. 4. c. 96)
Highways (Ireland) Act 1813 (repealed)	53 Geo. 3. c. 76	2 July 1813
An Act to extend the Provisions of an Act, passed in the Forty ninth Year of His present Majesty, (Note: Highways (Ireland) Act 1809 (49 Geo. 3. c. 84)) for amending the Irish Road Acts, so far as the same relate to the Appointment of Supervisors on Mail Coach Roads, to all Roads made and repaired by Presentment. (Repealed by Statute Law Revision Act 1873 (36 & 37 Vict. c. 91))
Bridges (Ireland) Act 1813	53 Geo. 3. c. 77	2 July 1813
An Act to amend an Act, passed in Ireland in the Nineteenth and Twentieth Years of His present Majesty, (Note: Bridges Act 1779 (19 & 20 Geo. 3. c. 41 (I))) for empowering Grand Juries to present Bridges, and Tolls to be paid for passing the same, in certain cases.
Arms (Ireland) Act 1813 (repealed)	53 Geo. 3. c. 78	2 July 1813
An Act to continue for Two Years, and from thence until the End of the then next Session of Parliament, Two Acts made in the Forty seventh (Note: Possession of Arms (Ireland) Act 1807 (47 Geo. 3 Sess. 2. c. 54)) and Fiftieth (Note: Arms (Ireland) Act 1810 (50 Geo. 3. c. 109)) Years of His present Majesty's Reign, for the preventing improper Persons from having Arms in Ireland. (Repealed by Statute Law Revision Act 1873 (36 & 37 Vict. c. 91))
Militia Pay (Ireland) Act 1813 (repealed)	53 Geo. 3. c. 79	2 July 1813
An Act for defraying the Charge of the Pay and Clothing of the Militia of Ireland; and for making Allowances in certain cases to Subaltern Officers of the said Militia during Peace. (Repealed by Statute Law Revision Act 1873 (36 & 37 Vict. c. 91))
Treasury Bills (Ireland) Act 1813 (repealed)	53 Geo. 3. c. 80	2 July 1813
An Act for raising the Sum of Three hundred and thirty thousand Pounds by Treasury Bills for the Service of Ireland, for the Year One thousand eight hundred and thirteen. (Repealed by Statute Law Revision Act 1873 (36 & 37 Vict. c. 91))
Militia Act 1813 (repealed)	53 Geo. 3. c. 81	2 July 1813
An Act to amend several Acts relating to the Militia, and to enlisting of the Militia into His Majesty's Regular Forces. (Repealed by Militia (Voluntary Enlistment) Act 1875 (38 & 39 Vict. c. 69))
Tolls for Certain Carriages Act 1813 (repealed)	53 Geo. 3. c. 82	2 July 1813
An Act to amend an Act made in the Fifty second Year of His present Majesty's Reign, intituled "An Act to explain the Exemption from Toll in several Acts of Parliament, for Carriages employed in Husbandry; and for regulating the Tolls to be paid on other Carriages, and on Horses, in certain other cases therein specified;" (Note: Exemption from Toll Act 1812 (52 Geo. 3. c. 145)) and for other Purposes relating thereto. (Repealed by Turnpike Roads Act 1822 (3 Geo. 4. c. 126))
Diet of Soldiers on a March Act 1813 (repealed)	53 Geo. 3. c. 83	2 July 1813
An Act to increase the Allowance to Innkeepers for Diet furnished to Soldiers on a March. (Repealed by Statute Law Revision Act 1873 (36 & 37 Vict. c. 91))
Duties on Cape Wines Act 1813 (repealed)	53 Geo. 3. c. 84	2 July 1813
An Act for repealing the Duties payable on the Importation of Wine the Produce of the Cape of Good Hope, and its Dependencies, and charging other Duties in lieu thereof. (Repealed by Statute Law Revision Act 1861 (24 & 25 Vict. c. 101))
Maintenance of Seamen in Foreign Parts Act 1813 (repealed)	53 Geo. 3. c. 85	2 July 1813
An Act for amending Two Acts passed in the Thirty first (Note: Navy Act 1757 (31 Geo. 2. c. 10)) and Thirty second (Note: Navy Act 1792 (32 Geo. 3. c. 33)) Years of His present Majesty, for the Encouragement of Seamen employed in the Royal Navy, and for establishing a regular Method for the punctual, frequent and certain Payment of their Wages, and for enabling them more easily and readily to remit the same for the Support of their Wives and Families, and for preventing Frauds and Abuses attending such Payments. (Repealed by Pay of the Navy Act 1830 (11 Geo. 4 & 1 Will. 4. c. 20))
Naval Compensations, etc. Act 1813 (repealed)	53 Geo. 3. c. 86	2 July 1813
An Act to explain an Act made in the Fiftieth Year of His present Majesty, (Note: Public Salaries, etc. Act 1810 (50 Geo. 3. c. 117)) for directing Accounts of Increase end Diminution of Public Salaries, Pensions and Allowances, to be annually laid before Parliament; and to regulate and controul the granting and paying of such Salaries, Pensions and Allowances. (Repealed by Statute Law Revision Act 1861 (24 & 25 Vict. c. 101))
Frauds by Boatmen, etc. Act 1813 (repealed)	53 Geo. 3. c. 87	2 July 1813
An Act to continue for Seven Years Two Acts passed in the Forty eighth (Note: Frauds by Boatmen in Cinque Ports, etc. Act 1808 (48 Geo. 3. c. 130)) and Forty ninth (Note: Frauds by Boatmen and others, etc. Act 1809 (49 Geo. 3. c. 122)) Years of the Reign of His present Majesty, for preventing Frauds by Boatmen and others; and adjusting Salvage; and for extending and amending the Laws relating to Wreck and Salvage. (Repealed by Statute Law Revision Act 1861 (24 & 25 Vict. c. 101))
Excise (No. 3) Act 1813 (repealed)	53 Geo. 3. c. 88	2 July 1813
An Act to substitute a Declaration in lieu of an Oath in the Verification of the Books of Persons dealing in certain Exciseable Articles. (Repealed by Statute Law Revision Act 1873 (36 & 37 Vict. c. 91))
Parliamentary Writs Act 1813	53 Geo. 3. c. 89	2 July 1813
An Act for the more regular Conveyance of Writs for the Election of Members to serve in Parliament.
Militia Allowances Act 1813 (repealed)	53 Geo. 3. c. 90	2 July 1813
An Act to revive and continue, until the Twenty fifth Day of March One thousand eight hundred and fourteen, and amend so much of an Act, made in the Thirty ninth and Fortieth Year of His present Majesty, (Note: Militia Allowances Act 1800 (39 & 40 Geo. 3. c. 44)) as grants certain Allowances to Adjutants and Serjeant Majors of the Militia of England, disembodied under an Act of the same Session of Parliament. (Note: Militia Act 1799 (39 & 40 Geo. 3. c. 1))) (Repealed by Statute Law Revision Act 1873 (36 & 37 Vict. c. 91))
Militia Allowances (No. 2) Act 1813 (repealed)	53 Geo. 3. c. 91	2 July 1813
An Act for making Allowances in certain cases to Subaltern Officers of the Militia in Great Britain while disembodied. (Repealed by Statute Law Revision Act 1873 (36 & 37 Vict. c. 91))
Leases of Episcopal Lands (Ireland) Act 1813	53 Geo. 3. c. 92	2 July 1813
An Act for the Removal of Doubts respecting the Powers of Archbishops and Bishops in Ireland, as to demising the Mensal Lands, not being Demesne Lands, to their respective Sees belonging.
Lotteries Act 1813 (repealed)	53 Geo. 3. c. 93	2 July 1813
An Act for granting to His Majesty a Sum of Money to be raised by Lotteries. (Repealed by Statute Law Revision Act 1873 (36 & 37 Vict. c. 91))
Duty on Spirits (Ireland) Act 1813 (repealed)	53 Geo. 3. c. 94	6 July 1813
An Act to grant an additional Duty of Excise on Spirits made or distilled from Corn or Grain in Ireland. (Repealed by Statute Law Revision Act 1873 (36 & 37 Vict. c. 91))
National Debt Reduction Act 1813 (repealed)	53 Geo. 3. c. 95	6 July 1813
An Act to provide for the Charge of the Addition to the Public Funded Debt of Great Britain, in the Year One thousand eight hundred and thirteen. (Repealed by Statute Law Revision Act 1870 (33 & 34 Vict. c. 69))
Militia Pay (Great Britain) Act 1813 (repealed)	53 Geo. 3. c. 96	6 July 1813
An Act for defraying the Charge of the Pay and Clothing of the Militia and Local Militia in Great Britain for the Year One thousand eight hundred and thirteen. (Repealed by Statute Law Revision Act 1873 (36 & 37 Vict. c. 91))
Sale of Muriate of Potash, etc. Act 1813 (repealed)	53 Geo. 3. c. 97	7 July 1813
An Act for allowing Glass Makers to dispose of Muriate of Potash arising in the Manufacture of Flux for Glass, for use in the Manufacture of Alum, and for charging a Duty of Excise thereon. (Repealed by Statute Law Revision Act 1861 (24 & 25 Vict. c. 101))
Exportation (No. 6) Act 1813 (repealed)	53 Geo. 3. c. 98	7 July 1813
An Act for the more correct Ascertainment of the Value of Duty-free Goods exported. (Repealed by Customs Law Repeal Act 1825 (6 Geo. 4. c. 105))
Offences Committed by Soldiers Act 1813 (repealed)	53 Geo. 3. c. 99	7 July 1813
An Act for the more speedy and effectual Trial and Punishment of Offences committed by Soldiers detached in Places beyond the Seas out of His Majesty's Dominions. (Repealed by Statute Law Revision Act 1873 (36 & 37 Vict. c. 91))
Audit of Accounts Act 1813 (repealed)	53 Geo. 3. c. 100	7 July 1813
An Act for facilitating the making up and Audit of the Accounts of the Paymaster General of His Majesty's Forces for the Years One thousand eight hundred and five, One thousand eight hundred and six and One thousand eight hundred and seven, and for enabling the said Paymaster General to accept Foreign Bills of Exchange payable at the Bank of England. (Repealed by Statute Law Revision Act 1861 (24 & 25 Vict. c. 101))
Royal Canal Company (Ireland) Act 1813 (repealed)	53 Geo. 3. c. 101	7 July 1813
An Act to dissolve the Corporation of the Royal Canal Company in Ireland, and to appoint Commissioners for inquiring into and examining the Claims of the Creditors of the said Company, and other Matters relating to the said Company; and to provide for carrying on and completing the Canal from Dublin to Tarmonbury on the River Shannon. (Repealed by Statute Law Revision Act 1873 (36 & 37 Vict. c. 91))
Insolvent Debtors (England) Act 1813 (repealed)	53 Geo. 3. c. 102	10 July 1813
An Act for the Relief of Insolvent Debtors in England. (Repealed by Statute Law Revision Act 1873 (36 & 37 Vict. c. 91))
Excise (No. 4) Act 1813 (repealed)	53 Geo. 3. c. 103	10 July 1813
An Act to authorize the Commissioners to transfer Excise Licences to the Executors or Administrators of deceased Licensed Traders, or to their Successors, in the Houses from which such Licensed Traders shall have removed. (Repealed by Statute Law Revision Act 1861 (24 & 25 Vict. c. 101))
Duties on Sugar (Ireland) Act 1813 (repealed)	53 Geo. 3. c. 104	10 July 1813
An Act to permit the Entry into Ireland, for Home Consumption, of Sugar, the Produce or Manufacture of Martinique, Mariegalante, Guadaloupe, Saint Eustatia, Saint Martin and Saba, at a lower Rate of Duty than is payable upon Sugar not of the British Plantations. (Repealed by Statute Law Revision Act 1861 (24 & 25 Vict. c. 101))
Customs (No. 3) Act 1813 (repealed)	53 Geo. 3. c. 105	10 July 1813
An Act to explain and amend an Act of the present Session, (Note: Customs Act 1813 (53 Geo. 3. c. 33)) for granting additional Duties of Customs on Goods, Wares or Merchandize imported into and exported from Great Britain; for allowing a Drawback on Carrot Tobacco exported; for altering the Duties on Pearls imported; for repealing the additional Duty on Barilla granted by the said Act; for allowing a Drawback of the additional Duties of Customs on Timber used in the Tin, Lead and Copper Mines of Devon and Cornwall; for ascertaining the time when the Bounty on Goods exported may be claimed; for better preventing the Clandestine Exportation of Goods; and for appropriating the Duties on Sugar, the Produce of Martinique and other Places, granted by an Act of this Session. (Note: Duties on Sugar Act 1813 (53 Geo. 3. c. 62)) (Repealed by Customs Law Repeal Act 1825 (6 Geo. 4. c. 105))
Counterfeiting of Bank of Ireland Tokens Act 1813 (repealed)	53 Geo. 3. c. 106	10 July 1813
An Act to extend the Provisions of an Act made in the Forty fifth Year of His present Majesty's Reign, (Note: Counterfeiting Bank of Ireland Silver Tokens, etc. Act 1805 (45 Geo. 3. c. 42)) for preventing the Counterfeiting of certain Silver Tokens, to certain other Tokens which have been or may be issued by the Governor and Company of the Bank of Ireland. (Repealed by Statute Law Revision Act 1861 (24 & 25 Vict. c. 101))
Endowed Schools (Ireland) Act 1813 or the Endowed Schools Act 1813	53 Geo. 3. c. 107	10 July 1813
An Act for the Appointment of Commissioners for the Regulation of the several Endowed Schools of Public and Private Foundation in Ireland.
Stamps Act 1813 (repealed)	53 Geo. 3. c. 108	10 July 1813
An Act for altering explaining and amending an Act of the Forty eighth Year of His Majesty's Reign, for granting Stamp Duties in Great Britain, with regard to the Duties on Re-issuable Promissory Notes, and on Conveyances on the Sale and Mortgage of Property; for better enabling the Commissioners of Stamps to give Relief in Cases of spoiled Stamps, and to remit Penalties; for exempting certain Instruments from Stamp Duty; and for better securing the Duties on Stage Coaches. (Repealed by Inland Revenue Repeal Act 1870 (33 & 34 Vict. c. 99))
Duties on Glass Act 1813 (repealed)	53 Geo. 3. c. 109	10 July 1813
An Act to continue until the First Day of August One thousand eight hundred and fourteen, several Laws relating to the Duties on Glass made in Great Britain. (Repealed by Statute Law Revision Act 1873 (36 & 37 Vict. c. 91))
Importation into Isle of Man Act 1813 (repealed)	53 Geo. 3. c. 110	10 July 1813
An Act to suspend the Exportation of Foreign Spirits from Great Britain to the Isle of Man under Licence from the Commissioners of Customs, and to permit the Exportation of a limited Quantity of Irish Spirits in lieu thereof, under Licence from the Commissioners of Customs and Port Duties in Ireland, from certain Ports of that Part of the Kingdom to the said Isle, until the Fifth Day of July One thousand eight hundred and fourteen. (Repealed by Statute Law Revision Act 1873 (36 & 37 Vict. c. 91))
Southern Whale Fishery Act 1813 (repealed)	53 Geo. 3. c. 111	10 July 1813
An Act for the more easy Manning of Ships and Vessels employed in the Southern Whale Fishery. (Repealed by Customs Law Repeal Act 1825 (6 Geo. 4. c. 105))
Slave Trade Act 1813 (repealed)	53 Geo. 3. c. 112	10 July 1813
An Act to enlarge the Time for commencing Prosecutions for Forfeitures under certain Acts relating to the Abolition of the Slave Trade. (Repealed by Statute Law Revision Act 1861 (24 & 25 Vict. c. 101))
Poor Prisoners Relief Act 1813	53 Geo. 3. c. 113	10 July 1813
An Act for providing Relief for the Poor Prisoners confined in the King's Bench, Fleet and Marshalsea, Prisons.
Issue, etc., of Gold and Silver Tokens (No. 2) Act 1813 (repealed)	53 Geo. 3. c. 114	10 July 1813
An Act to continue and amend an Act of the present Session, (Note: Issue, etc., of Gold and Silver Tokens Act 1813 (53 Geo. 3. c. 19)) to prevent the issuing and circulating of Pieces of Gold and Silver, or other Metal, usually called Tokens, except such as are issued by the Banks of England and Ireland respectively. (Repealed by Statute Law Revision Act 1861 (24 & 25 Vict. c. 101))
Firearms Act 1813	53 Geo. 3. c. 115	10 July 1813
An Act to insure the proper and careful manufacturing of Fire Arms in England; and for making Provision for proving the Barrels of such Fire Arms.
Price, etc., of Bread Act 1813 (repealed)	53 Geo. 3. c. 116	10 July 1813
An Act to alter and amend Two Acts, of the Thirty first Year of King George the Second, (Note: Making of Bread Act 1757 (31 Geo. 2. c. 29)) and the Thirteenth Year of His present Majesty, (Note: Bread Act 1772 (13 Geo. 3. c. 62)) so far as relates to the Price and Assize of Bread to be sold out of the City of London and the Liberties thereof, and beyond the Weekly Bills of Mortality, and Ten Miles of the Royal Exchange. (Repealed by Statute Law Revision Act 1861 (24 & 25 Vict. c. 101))
Bridges (Scotland) Act 1813 (repealed)	53 Geo. 3. c. 117	10 July 1813
An Act to prevent Damage to certain Bridges in Scotland from the floating of Timber. (Repealed by Statute Law (Repeals) Act 1973 (c. 39))
Exchequer Bills (No. 4) Act 1813 (repealed)	53 Geo. 3. c. 118	10 July 1813
An Act for raising the Sum of Five millions six hundred and seventy thousand and seven hundred Pounds, by Exchequer Bills for the Service of Great Britain, for the Year One thousand eight hundred and thirteen. (Repealed by Statute Law Revision Act 1873 (36 & 37 Vict. c. 91))
Exchequer Bills (No. 5) Act 1813 (repealed)	53 Geo. 3. c. 119	10 July 1813
An Act for raising the Sum of One Million, by Exchequer Bills, for the Service of Great Britain, for the Year One thousand eight hundred and thirteen. (Repealed by Statute Law Revision Act 1873 (36 & 37 Vict. c. 91))
National Debt of Ireland Reduction Act 1813 (repealed)	53 Geo. 3. c. 120	10 July 1813
An Act to enable the Lords of the Treasury of Ireland to issue to the Commissioners for the Reduction of the National Debt, a Sum equal to One per Centum on the Amount of Treasury Bills outstanding in every Year. (Repealed by Statute Law Revision Act 1861 (24 & 25 Vict. c. 101))
New Street Act 1813 or the Communications from Marylebone to Charing Cross Act 1813	53 Geo. 3. c. 121	10 July 1813
An Act for making a more convenient Communication from Mary le Bone Park and the Northern Parts of the Metropolis, in the Parish of Saint Mary le Bone to Charing Cross, within the Liberty of Westminster; and for making a more convenient Sewage for the same.
Spencer Perceval's Pensions Act 1813 (repealed)	53 Geo. 3. c. 122	10 July 1813
An Act for confirming the Renunciation made by Spencer Perceval Esquire of his Pensions on his taking the Office of a Teller of the Exchequer. (Note: Teller of the Receipt of the Exchequer.) (Repealed by Statute Law Revision Act 1873 (36 & 37 Vict. c. 91))
Land Tax Redemption Act 1813 (repealed)	53 Geo. 3. c. 123	12 July 1813
An Act to amend and render more effectual several Acts passed for the Redemption and Sale of the Land Tax. (Repealed by Statute Law (Repeals) Act 1989 (c. 43))
Salt Duty Act 1813 (repealed)	53 Geo. 3. c. 124	12 July 1813
An Act for allowing the Use of Salt, Duty-free, for curing Conger, Polock, Bream, Ray and Scate. (Repealed by Statute Law Revision Act 1861 (24 & 25 Vict. c. 101))
Exportation (No. 7) Act 1813 (repealed)	53 Geo. 3. c. 125	12 July 1813
An Act to allow a Bounty upon the Exportation of Stuffs of Silk ornamented with Embroidery, Tambour, Needle Work, Lace or Fringe; and upon the Exportation of Ribbons made of Silk mixed with Incle or Cotton. (Repealed by Customs Law Repeal Act 1825 (6 Geo. 4. c. 105))
Embezzlement of Public Stores Act 1813	53 Geo. 3. c. 126	12 July 1813
An Act to extend the Provisions of an Act of the Ninth and Tenth Year of King William the Third, (Note: Embezzlement of Public Stores Act 1697 (9 Will. 3. c. 41)) for preventing the Embezzlement of Stores of War, to all Public Stores.
Ecclesiastical Courts Act 1813	53 Geo. 3. c. 127	12 July 1813
An Act for the better Regulation of Ecclesiastical Courts in England; and for the more easy Recovery of Church Rates and Tithes.
Roman Catholic Relief Act 1813 (repealed)	53 Geo. 3. c. 128	12 July 1813
An Act to relieve from the Operation of the Statute of the Twenty fifth Year of the Reign of King Charles the Second, intituled "An Act for preventing Dangers which may happen from Popish Recusants", (Note: Popish Recusants Act 1672 (25 Cha. 2. c. 2)) all such of His Majesty's Popish or Roman Catholic Subjects of Ireland as, by virtue of the Act of Parliament of Ireland of the Thirty third Year of His Majesty's Reign, intituled "An Act for the Relief of His Majesty's Popish or Roman Catholic Subjects of Ireland", (Note: Roman Catholic Relief Act 1793 (33 Geo. 3. c. 21 (I))) hold, exercise or enjoy any Civil or Military Offices or Places of Trust or Profit, or any other Office whatsoever, of which His Majesty's said Subjects are by the said Act of Parliament of Ireland rendered capable. (Repealed by Statute Law Revision Act 1861 (24 & 25 Vict. c. 101))
Six Clerks in Chancery (Ireland) Act 1813 (repealed)	53 Geo. 3. c. 129	12 July 1813
An Act to amend an Act made in the Forty ninth Year of His Majesty's Reign, (Note: Sale of Offices Act 1809 (49 Geo. 3. c. 126)) for the further Prevention of the Sale and Brokerage of Offices, so far as relates to the Offices of the Six Clerks in the Court of Chancery in Ireland. (Repealed by Statute Law Revision Act 1861 (24 & 25 Vict. c. 101))
Inquiry into Public Offices (Ireland) Act 1813 (repealed)	53 Geo. 3. c. 130	12 July 1813
An Act to continue until the First Day of January One thousand eight hundred and fourteen, or in case Parliament shall not have assembled before the said First Day of January, then until Three Weeks after the then next Meeting of Parliament, certain Acts for appointing Commissioners to enquire into the Fees, Gratuities, Perquisites and Emoluments received in several Public Offices in Ireland, to examine into any Abuses which may exist in the same, and into the mode of receiving collecting issuing and accounting for Public Money in Ireland. (Repealed by Statute Law Revision Act 1873 (36 & 37 Vict. c. 91))
Court Houses (Ireland) Act 1813	53 Geo. 3. c. 131	12 July 1813
An Act to make further Regulations for the Building and Repairing of Court Houses and Sessions Houses in Ireland.
Militia (Tower Hamlets) Act 1813 (repealed)	53 Geo. 3. c. 132	12 July 1813
An Act to extend the Services of the Militia of the Tower Hamlets to all Parts of the United Kingdom. (Repealed by Militia Act 1882 (45 & 46 Vict. c. 49))
Purchase of Estate for Duke of Wellington Act 1813	53 Geo. 3. c. 133	12 July 1813
An Act to amend an Act of the present Session of Parliament, (Note: Purchase of Estate for Duke of Wellington Act 1812 (53 Geo. 3. c. 4)) for granting a Sum of Money for purchasing an Estate for the Marquis of Wellington and his Heirs, in consideration of the eminent and signal Services performed by the said Marquis Wellington to His Majesty and the Public.
Settlement of Estate on Lord Nelson Act 1813	53 Geo. 3. c. 134	12 July 1813
An Act to amend an Act of the Forty sixth Year of His present Majesty, (Note: Lord Nelson (Annuity) Act 1806 (46 Geo. 3. c. 146)) for settling and securing a certain Annuity, and for purchasing an Estate for the Earl Nelson.
Bringing of Coals to London, etc. Act 1813 (repealed)	53 Geo. 3. c. 135	12 July 1813
An Act to continue until the First Day of August One thousand eight hundred and fifteen, Two Acts of the Forty fifth (Note: Bringing of Coals, etc., to London, etc. Act 1805 (45 Geo. 3. c. 128)) and Fiftieth (Note: Bringing of Coals, etc., to London, etc. Act 1810 (50 Geo. 3. c. 110)) Years of His present Majesty, allowing the bringing of Coals, Culm and Cinders to London and Westminster by Inland Navigation. (Repealed by Statute Law Revision Act 1873 (36 & 37 Vict. c. 91))
Appropriation Act 1813 (repealed)	53 Geo. 3. c. 136	12 July 1813
An Act for granting to His Majesty certain Sums of Money out of the Consolidated Fund of Great Britain; and for applying certain Monies therein mentioned, for the Service of the Year One thousand eight hundred and thirteen; and for further appropriating the Supplies granted in this Session of Parliament. (Repealed by Statute Law Revision Act 1873 (36 & 37 Vict. c. 91))
Sale of Spirituous Liquors, etc. (Ireland) Act 1813 (repealed)	53 Geo. 3. c. 137	13 July 1813
An Act to amend the several Acts for regulating Licences for the Sale of Spirituous Liquors, Wine, Beer, Ale and Cyder, by Retail in Ireland. (Repealed by Statute Law Revision Act 1861 (24 & 25 Vict. c. 101))
Insolvent Debtors (Ireland) Act 1813 (repealed)	53 Geo. 3. c. 138	13 July 1813
An Act for the Relief of Insolvent Debtors in Ireland. (Repealed by Statute Law Revision Act 1873 (36 & 37 Vict. c. 91))
Exemption of Bankers from Penalties Act 1813 (repealed)	53 Geo. 3. c. 139	13 July 1813
An Act for exempting Bankers, and others from certain Penalties contained in an Act of the last Session of Parliament, (Note: Counterfeiting Tokens, etc. Act 1812 (52 Geo. 3. c. 138)) for the further Prevention of the Counterfeiting of Silver Tokens issued by the Governor and Company of the Bank of England, called Dollars and of Silver Pieces issued and circulated by the Governor and Company, called Tokens; and for the further Prevention of Frauds practised by the Imitation of the Notes or Bills of the said Governor and Company. (Repealed by Statute Law Revision Act 1873 (36 & 37 Vict. c. 91))
Cinque Ports Pilots Act 1813 (repealed)	53 Geo. 3. c. 140	13 July 1813
An Act to amend an Act passed in the last Session of Parliament, intituled "An Act for the more effectual Regulation of Pilots, and of the Pilotage of Ships and Vessels on the Coast of England," (Note: Pilotage Act 1812 (52 Geo. 3. c. 39)) and for the Regulation of Boatmen employed in supplying Vessels with Pilots licensed under the said Act, so far as relates to the Coast of Kent, within the Limits of The Cinque Ports. (Repealed by Statute Law Revision Act 1861 (24 & 25 Vict. c. 101))
Inrolment of Grants of Annuities Act 1813	53 Geo. 3. c. 141	14 July 1813
An Act to repeal an Act of the Seventeenth Year of the Reign of His present Majesty, intituled "An Act for registering the Grants of Life Annuities, and for the better Protection of Infants against such Grants," (Note: Grants of Life Annuities Act 1776 (17 Geo. 3. c. 26)) and to substitute other Provisions in lieu thereof.
Land Tax Act 1813	53 Geo. 3. c. 142	14 July 1813
An Act to explain and amend several Acts relative to the Land Tax.
Grand Canal (Ireland) Act 1813	53 Geo. 3. c. 143	14 July 1813
An Act to direct the Application of the Sum of Fifty thousand Pounds, and of such further Sums as may be granted for the Benefit of the Company of Undertakers of The Grand Canal, in Ireland.
Inland Navigation (Ireland) Act 1813	53 Geo. 3. c. 144	14 July 1813
An Act to amend an Act of the Parliament of Ireland of the Fortieth Year of His present Majesty, (Note: Inland Navigation Act 1800 (40 Geo. 3. c. 51 (I))) for promoting Inland Navigation in Ireland.
Distillation of Spirits (Ireland) Act 1813 (repealed)	53 Geo. 3. c. 145	20 July 1813
An Act to amend the several Acts for regulating the Distillation of Spirits in Ireland. (Repealed by Statute Law Revision Act 1861 (24 & 25 Vict. c. 101))
Highways (Ireland) (No. 2) Act 1813 (repealed)	53 Geo. 3. c. 146	20 July 1813
An Act to amend an Act made in the Forty fifth Year of His present Majesty, intituled "An Act to amend the Laws for improving and keeping in Repair the Post Roads in Ireland, and for rendering the Conveyance of Letters by His Majesty's Post Office more secure and expeditious." (Note: Highways (Ireland) Act 1805 (45 Geo. 3. c. 43)) (Repealed by Statute Law Revision Act 1873 (36 & 37 Vict. c. 91))
Duties on Spirits (Great Britain) Act 1813 (repealed)	53 Geo. 3. c. 147	20 July 1813
An Act for the better securing the Excise Duties on Spirits in Great Britain, and for rectifying a Mistake in an Act of the last Session of Parliament, (Note: Distillation of Spirits Act 1812 (52 Geo. 3. c. 3)) for granting certain Duties on Worts or Wash made from Sugar. (Repealed by Statute Law Revision Act 1861 (24 & 25 Vict. c. 101))
Distillation of Spirits (Ireland) (No. 2) Act 1813 (repealed)	53 Geo. 3. c. 148	20 July 1813
An Act to provide for the more effectually preventing the Illicit Distillation of Spirits in Ireland. (Repealed by Statute Law Revision Act 1861 (24 & 25 Vict. c. 101))
Stipendiary Curates Act 1813	53 Geo. 3. c. 149	20 July 1813
An Act for the further Support and Maintenance of Stipendiary Curates.
Audit of Accounts, etc. Act 1813	53 Geo. 3. c. 150	20 July 1813
An Act for the more speedy and effectual Examination and Audit of the Accounts of Military Expenditure in Spain and Portugal, for removing Delays in passing the Public Accounts, and for making new Arrangements for conducting the Business of the Audit Office.
Registry of Admiralty Court Act 1813 (repealed)	53 Geo. 3. c. 151	20 July 1813
An Act for regulating the Office of Registrar of the High Court of Admiralty, and High Court of Appeals for Prizes. (Repealed by Statute Law Revision Act 1873 (36 & 37 Vict. c. 91))
Westminster Election Act 1813 (repealed)	53 Geo. 3. c. 152	20 July 1813
An Act to continue until the First Day of January One thousand eight hundred and nineteen, an Act made in the Fifty first Year of His present Majesty, (Note: Westminster Parliamentary Elections Act 1811 (51 Geo. 3. c. 126)) to explain and amend the Laws touching the Elections of Knights of the Shire to serve in Parliament for England, respecting the Expences of Hustings and Poll Clerks so far as regards the City of Westminster. (Repealed by Statute Law Revision Act 1873 (36 & 37 Vict. c. 91))
Judges' Pensions Act 1813 (repealed)	53 Geo. 3. c. 153	20 July 1813
An Act to enable His Majesty to grant additional Annuities to the Judges of the Courts in Westminster Hall, on their Resignation of their Offices. (Repealed by Supreme Court of Judicature (Consolidation) Act 1925 (15 & 16 Geo. 5. c. 49))
Kilmainham Hospital (Pensions Commutation) Act 1813 (repealed)	53 Geo. 3. c. 154	20 July 1813
An Act to render valid, and to authorize the Payment and granting of certain Pensions at Kilmainham Hospital, and to empower the Commissioners of the said Hospital to commute Pensions for a Sum of Money in certain Cases. (Repealed by Statute Law (Repeals) Act 1976 (c. 16))
East India Company Act 1813 or the Charter Act 1813 (repealed)	53 Geo. 3. c. 155	21 July 1813
An Act for continuing in the East India Company, for a further Term, the Possession of the British Territories in India, together with certain exclusive Privileges; for establishing further Regulations for the Government of the said Territories, and the better Administration of Justice within the same; and for regulating the Trade to and from the Places within the Limits of the said Company's Charter. (Repealed by Government of India Act 1915 (5 & 6 Geo. 5. c. 61))
Charge of Certain Annuities Act 1813 (repealed)	53 Geo. 3. c. 156	21 July 1813
An Act to provide for the Payment of the Charge of the Annuities created in respect of the Sum of Six Millions granted for the Service of Ireland, for the Year One thousand eight hundred and thirteen. (Repealed by Statute Law Revision Act 1861 (24 & 25 Vict. c. 101))
Grant of John Palmer, Esquire (Post Office Services) Act 1813 (repealed)	53 Geo. 3. c. 157	21 July 1813
An Act for granting the Sum of Fifty thousand Pounds to John Palmer Esquire, in consideration of the Public Services performed by the said John Palmer, in the Improvement of the Post Office Revenue. (Repealed by Statute Law Revision Act 1873 (36 & 37 Vict. c. 91))
Windsor Forest Act 1813 (repealed)	53 Geo. 3. c. 158	21 July 1813
An Act for vesting in His Majesty certain parts of Windsor Forest in the county of Berks; and for inclosing the open commonable lands within the said forest. (Repealed by Wild Creatures and Forest Laws Act 1971 (c. 47))
Responsibility of Shipowners Act 1813 (repealed)	53 Geo. 3. c. 159	21 July 1813
An Act to limit the Responsibility of Ship Owners in certain cases. (Repealed by Merchant Shipping Repeal Act 1854 (17 & 18 Vict. c. 120))
Doctrine of the Trinity Act 1813 (repealed)	53 Geo. 3. c. 160	21 July 1813
An Act to relieve Persons who impugn the Doctrine of the Holy Trinity from certain Penalties. (Repealed by Statute Law Revision Act 1873 (36 & 37 Vict. c. 91))
Exchequer Bills, etc. Act 1813 (repealed)	53 Geo. 3. c. 161	22 July 1813
An Act for enabling His Majesty to raise the Sum of Five Millions for the Service of Great Britain; and for applying the Sum of Two hundred thousand Pounds British Currency for the Service of Ireland. (Repealed by Statute Law Revision Act 1873 (36 & 37 Vict. c. 91))
Imprisonment with Hard Labour Act 1813 (repealed)	53 Geo. 3. c. 162	22 July 1813
An Act to repeal a certain Provision respecting Persons convicted of Felony without Benefit of Clergy, contained in an Act made in the Fifty-second Year of the Reign of His present Majesty, (Note: Penitentiary House, etc. Act 1812 (52 Geo. 3. c. 44)) for the Erection of a Penitentiary House for the Confinement of Persons convicted within the City of London and County of Middlesex, and for making other Provisions in lieu thereof. (Repealed by Statute Law Revision Act 1873 (36 & 37 Vict. c. 91))

=== Local acts ===
Short title	Citation	Royal assent
Long title
Rochdale and Bury Road Act 1813 (repealed)	53 Geo. 3. c. i	23 March 1813
An Act to enlarge the Term and Powers of an Act of His present Majesty, (Note: Rochdale and Bury and Sudden Roads Act 1797 (37 Geo. 3. c. 146)) for repairing the Road from the Guide Post near Sudden Bridge, in the Parish of Rochdale, to Bury, and a Branch therefrom, all in the County Palatine of Lancaster. (Repealed by Rochdale and Bury Road Act 1833 (c.viii))
Tiverton Roads Act 1813 (repealed)	53 Geo. 3. c. ii	23 March 1813
(Repealed by Tiverton Roads Act 1830 (c.xcvii))
Dunsford and Cherrybrook Road Act 1813 (repealed)	53 Geo. 3. c. iii	23 March 1813
(Repealed by Dunsford and Cherrybrook Road Act 1833 (c.vi))
Road from Little Bowden to Rockingham Act 1813 (repealed)	53 Geo. 3. c. iv	23 March 1813
(Repealed by Road from Little Bowden to Rockingham Act 1835 (c.xix))
Maisemore Bridge Act 1813	53 Geo. 3. c. v	23 March 1813
An Act for altering and enlarging the Powers of an Act of the Seventeenth Year of His present Majesty, (Note: Maisemore Bridge Act 1777 (17 Geo. 3. c. 68)) for building a Bridge at Maismore, in the County of Gloucester.
Road from Coventry to Rugby Act 1813	53 Geo. 3. c. vi	23 March 1813
Roads in Glamorgan Act 1813 (repealed)	53 Geo. 3. c. vii	23 March 1813
(Repealed by Turnpike Trusts in South Wales Act 1844 (7 & 8 Vict. c. 91))
Kilmarnock Improvement Act 1813	53 Geo. 3. c. viii	23 March 1813
Norwich and North Walsham Road Act 1813 (repealed)	53 Geo. 3. c. ix	23 March 1813
An Act for enlarging the Term and Powers of an Act of His present Majesty, (Note: Norwich and North Walsham Road Act 1797 (37 Geo. 3. c. 147)) for repairing the Road from the City of Norwich to North Walsham, in the County of Norfolk. (Repealed by Norwich and North Walsham Road Act 1831 (c.xxxii))
Norwich and Swaffham Road Act 1813 (repealed)	53 Geo. 3. c. x	23 March 1813
An Act for enlarging the Term and Powers of Two Acts of His present Majesty, (Note: Norwich and Swaffham Road Act 1770 (10 Geo. 3. c. 67)) (Note: Norwich to Swaffham Road Act 1792 (32 Geo. 3. c. 112)) for repairing the Road from the City of Norwich to Swaffham, and from Honingham to Yaxham, in the County of Norfolk and also a Lane called Hangman's Lane, near the Gates of the said City. (Repealed by Norwich and Swaffham Road Act 1835 (c.xl))
Road from Bawtry and from Little Drayton Act 1813	53 Geo. 3. c. xi	23 March 1813
Road from Dunham Ferry to Great Markham Common Act 1813	53 Geo. 3. c. xii	23 March 1813
Road from Lanark to Hamilton Act 1813 (repealed)	53 Geo. 3. c. xiii	23 March 1813
(Repealed by Lanark Roads and Crossford Bridge Act 1834 (c.lxxii))
Geist Inclosure Act 1813	53 Geo. 3. c. xiv	23 March 1813
An Act for inclosing Lands in the Parish of Geist, in the County of Norfolk.
Fawley Inclosure Act 1813	53 Geo. 3. c. xv	23 March 1813
An Act for inclosing Lands in the Parish of Fawley, in the County of Southampton.
Witham-on-the-Hill, Manthorpe, Toft and Lound Inclosures Act 1813	53 Geo. 3. c. xvi	23 March 1813
An Act for inclosing Lands in the Parish of Witham on the Hill, with Manthorpe, Toft and Lound, in the County of Lincoln.
Askham Richard Inclosure Act 1813	53 Geo. 3. c. xvii	23 March 1813
An Act for inclosing Lands in the Parish of Askham Richard, in the County of the City of York.
Haburgh Inclosure Act 1813	53 Geo. 3. c. xviii	23 March 1813
An Act for inclosing Lands in the Parish of Haburgh, in the County of Lincoln.
Wey and Arun Junction Canal Act 1813	53 Geo. 3. c. xix	1 April 1813
An Act for making and maintaining a Navigable Canal, to unite the Rivers Wey and Arun, in the Counties of Surry and Sussex.
Manchester and Salford Water Act 1813	53 Geo. 3. c. xx	1 April 1813
An Act for enlarging the Powers of an Act of His present Majesty, (Note: Manchester and Salford Water Act 1809 (49 Geo. 3. c. cxcii)) for supplying with Water the Towns of Manchester and Salford, in the County Palatine of Lancaster.
St. Mary Islington Poor Relief and Workhouse Act 1813 (repealed)	53 Geo. 3. c. xxi	1 April 1813
(Repealed by St. Mary Islington Improvement Act 1824 (c.cxxv))
Battle and Robertsbridge Road Act 1813 (repealed)	53 Geo. 3. c. xxii	1 April 1813
(Repealed by Battle and Robertsbridge Road Act 1852 (c.lxxxi))
Roads from Market Harborough to Loughborough Act 1813 (repealed)	53 Geo. 3. c. xxiii	1 April 1813
(Repealed by Roads from Market Harborough to Loughborough Act 1830 (c.iii))
Aldeburgh Roads Act 1813 (repealed)	53 Geo. 3. c. xxiv	1 April 1813
(Repealed by Statute Law (Repeals) Act 2008 (c. 12))
Bowes and Sunderland Bridge Road Act 1813	53 Geo. 3. c. xxv	1 April 1813
Roads from Tavistock to Plymouth and from Manadon Gate Act 1813 (repealed)	53 Geo. 3. c. xxvi	1 April 1813
(Repealed by Plymouth and Tavistock Turnpike Act 1847 (c.xlvii))
Roads from Hertford and Ware Act 1813 (repealed)	53 Geo. 3. c. xxvii	1 April 1813
(Repealed by Roads from Hertford and Ware Act 1833 (c.xlii))
Hereford Cathedral and Sommers' Estate Act 1813	53 Geo. 3. c. xxviii	1 April 1813
Buglawton Inclosure Act 1813	53 Geo. 3. c. xxix	1 April 1813
An Act for inclosing Lands in the Manor and Township of Buglawton, in the County of Chester.
Rollesby Inclosure Act 1813	53 Geo. 3. c. xxx	1 April 1813
An Act for inclosing Lands in the Parish of Rollesby, in the County of Norfolk.
Melksham Inclosure Act 1813	53 Geo. 3. c. xxxi	1 April 1813
An Act for inclosing Lands in the Parish of Melksham, in the County of Wilts.
Regent's Canal Act 1813 (repealed)	53 Geo. 3. c. xxxii	15 April 1813
An Act to amend an Act of the last Session of Parliament (Note: Regent's Canal Act 1812 (52 Geo. 3. c. cxcv)) for making and maintaining a navigable Canal from the Grand Junction Canal, in the Parish of Paddington, to the River Thames in the Parish of Limehouse, with a Collateral Cut in the Parish of Saint Leonard Shoreditch, in the County of Middlesex. (Repealed by Grand Union Canal Act 1943 (6 & 7 Geo. 6. c. v))
Leith Harbour Act 1813 (repealed)	53 Geo. 3. c. xxxiii	15 April 1813
(Repealed by Leith Harbour and Docks Act 1875 (c.clx))
Porthleven Harbour Act 1813	53 Geo. 3. c. xxxiv	15 April 1813
Hartlepool Pier and Port Act 1813 (repealed)	53 Geo. 3. c. xxxv	15 April 1813
An Act for improving the Pier and Port of Hartlepool, in the County of Durham. (Repealed by Hartlepool Pier and Port Act 1851 (c.cxvii))
West Middlesex Waterworks Act 1813	53 Geo. 3. c. xxxvi	15 April 1813
An Act to authorize the Company of Proprietors of the West Middlesex Waterworks to raise a further Sum of Money, for enabling them more effectually to carry on their Works.
Mile End New Town Poor Relief Act 1813 (repealed)	53 Geo. 3. c. xxxvii	15 April 1813
(Repealed by London Government (Borough of Stepney) Order in Council 1901 (SR&O 1901/276))
St. George Hanover Square Improvement Act 1813 (repealed)	53 Geo. 3. c. xxxviii	15 April 1813
(Repealed by St. George Hanover Square Improvement Act 1826 (c.cxxi))
High Roads in Selkirk Act 1813 (repealed)	53 Geo. 3. c. xxxix	15 April 1813
(Repealed by Selkirkshire Roads Act 1867 (c.xlvii))
West Auckland and Elishaw Road Act 1813 (repealed)	53 Geo. 3. c. xl	15 April 1813
An Act for more effectually amending, widening and keeping in Repair, the Road leading from the North End of the Turnpike Road called The Coal Road, near West Auckland, in the County of Durham, to the Elsdon Turnpike Road, at or near Elishaw, in the County of Northumberland. (Repealed by West Auckland and Elishaw Road Act 1833 (c.lvi))
Godmanchester and Cambridge Road Act 1813 (repealed)	53 Geo. 3. c. xli	15 April 1813
(Repealed by Cambridge and Newmarket Heath Road Act 1815 (c.xlix))
Road from Burford to Lechlade Act 1813 (repealed)	53 Geo. 3. c. xlii	15 April 1813
(Repealed by Burford, Lechlade and Swindon Turnpike Roads Act 1853 (c.civ))
Westerham and Godstone Road Act 1813	53 Geo. 3. c. xliii	15 April 1813
Great Marlow and Stokenchurch Road Act 1813	53 Geo. 3. c. xliv	15 April 1813
Castleford and Ferrybridge Road Closure Act 1813	53 Geo. 3. c. xlv	15 April 1813
Roads in Clackmannan and Perth Act 1813 (repealed)	53 Geo. 3. c. xlvi	15 April 1813
(Repealed by Roads in Clackmannan and Perth Act 1840 (c.xl))
Lewes to Brighton Road Act 1813 (repealed)	53 Geo. 3. c. xlvii	15 April 1813
(Repealed by Lewes to Brighton Road Act 1833 (c.xliii))
Wakefield and Sheffield Road Act 1813 (repealed)	53 Geo. 3. c. xlviii	15 April 1813
(Repealed by Wakefield and Sheffield Road Act 1830 (c.xxii))
Prebendary of Cantlowes Leasing Act 1813	53 Geo. 3. c. xlix	15 April 1813
Earl of Chesterfield's Estate Act 1813	53 Geo. 3. c. l	15 April 1813
An Act for vesting Part of the Settled Estates of the Right Honourable Philip Earl of Chesterfield, in Trustees, in Trust to be sold; and for laying out the Monies arising from such Sales, in the Purchase of other Estates, to be settled to the same Uses.
Earl of Albemarle's Estate Act 1813	53 Geo. 3. c. li	15 April 1813
See of York Estates Act 1813	53 Geo. 3. c. lii	15 April 1813
Reade's Estate Act 1813	53 Geo. 3. c. liii	15 April 1813
Stoneleigh Inclosure Act 1813	53 Geo. 3. c. liv	15 April 1813
An Act for inclosing Lands in the Parish of Stonleigh, in the County of Warwick.
Ashley Inclosure Act 1813	53 Geo. 3. c. lv	15 April 1813
An Act for inclosing Lands in the Parish of Ashley, in the County of Stafford.
Ecchinswell Inclosure Act 1813	53 Geo. 3. c. lvi	15 April 1813
An Act for inclosing Lands in Ecchinswell, in the County of Southampton.
Stow Bedon Inclosure Act 1813	53 Geo. 3. c. lvii	15 April 1813
An Act for inclosing Lands in the Parish of Stow Bedon, in the County of Norfolk.
Laughton Inclosure Act 1813	53 Geo. 3. c. lviii	15 April 1813
An Act for inclosing Lands in the Manor of Laughton, in the County of Sussex.
Hardingham Inclosure Act 1813	53 Geo. 3. c. lix	15 April 1813
An Act for inclosing Lands in the Parish of Hardingham, in the County of Norfolk.
Wraxall, Nailsea and Bourton Inclosures Act 1813	53 Geo. 3. c. lx	15 April 1813
An Act for inclosing Lands in Wraxall, Nailsea and Bourton, in the County of Somerset.
Skelton Inclosure Act 1813	53 Geo. 3. c. lxi	15 April 1813
An Act for inclosing Lands in the Manor of Skelton in Cleveland, in the County of York.
Marylebone Park Improvement Act 1813	53 Geo. 3. c. lxii	1 May 1813
Yoker Bridge and Dumbarton Road Act 1813	53 Geo. 3. c. lxiii	1 May 1813
Ludlow-fach, Llandovery and River Amman Roads Act 1813 (repealed)	53 Geo. 3. c. lxiv	1 May 1813
(Repealed by Ludlow-fach, Llandovery and River Amman Roads Act 1831 (c.lix))
Road from Cullompton to Hazel Stone Act 1813 (repealed)	53 Geo. 3. c. lxv	1 May 1813
(Repealed by Road from Padbroke Bridge to Hazel Stone Act 1839 (c.xx))
Moira and Loudon Estates Act 1813	53 Geo. 3. c. lxvi	1 May 1813
Long Ashton Inclosure Act 1813	53 Geo. 3. c. lxvii	1 May 1813
An Act for inclosing Lands in Long Ashton, in the County of Somerset.
Rampisham Inclosure Act 1813	53 Geo. 3. c. lxviii	1 May 1813
An Act for inclosing Lands within the Manor of Rampisham in the Parishes of Rampisham and West Chelborough, in the County of Dorset.
Flint Inclosure Act 1813	53 Geo. 3. c. lxix	1 May 1813
An Act for inclosing Lands in the Township of Flint, in the County of Flint.
Cork Butter Trade Act 1813	53 Geo. 3. c. lxx	21 May 1813
An Act for reviving, amending, and making perpetual, an Act passed in the Parliament of Ireland, in the Fortieth Year of the Reign of His present Majesty, (Note: City of Cork (Butter Market) Act 1800 (40 Geo. 3. c. 100 (I))) for the better Regulation of the Butter Trade of the City of Cork, and the Liberties thereof; and for other Purposes therein mentioned.
Covent Garden Market Act 1813 (repealed)	53 Geo. 3. c. lxxi	21 May 1813
An Act for regulating Covent Garden Market. (Repealed by Covent Garden Improvement Act 1828 (c.cxiii))
Upper East Smithfield Improvement Act 1813 (repealed)	53 Geo. 3. c. lxxii	21 May 1813
(Repealed by London Government (Borough of Stepney) Order in Council 1901 (SR&O 1901/276))
Plymouth Workhouse Act 1813 (repealed)	53 Geo. 3. c. lxxiii	21 May 1813
(Repealed by Statute Law (Repeals) Act 2008 (c. 12))
Ardglass Harbour Roads Act 1813	53 Geo. 3. c. lxxiv	21 May 1813
Monkland Navigation Act 1813	53 Geo. 3. c. lxxv	21 May 1813
An Act for amending an Act of the Tenth Year of His present Majesty, (Note: Monkland Canal Act 1770 (10 Geo. 3. c. 105)) for making and maintaining a Navigable Cut or Canal, and Waggon Way, from the Collieries in the Parishes of Old and New Monkland, to the City of Glasgow.
Royal College of Surgeons (Edinburgh) Widows' Fund Act 1813 (repealed)	53 Geo. 3. c. lxxvi	21 May 1813
(Repealed by Royal College of Surgeons of Edinburgh (Widows' Fund) Act 1860 (c.clxxvi))
Edinburgh Gaol Act 1813	53 Geo. 3. c. lxxvii	21 May 1813
An Act for erecting and maintaining a new Gaol, and other Buildings, for the County and City of Edinburgh.
Oxford County Rate Act 1813 (repealed)	53 Geo. 3. c. lxxviii	21 May 1813
(Repealed by Oxfordshire Act 1985 (c.xxxiv))
Surrey and Kent Sewers Act 1813	53 Geo. 3. c. lxxix	21 May 1813
Ellesmere and Chester Canals Unification Act 1813 (repealed)	53 Geo. 3. c. lxxx	21 May 1813
An Act for uniting the Interests and Concerns of the Proprietors of the Chester Canal and Ellesmere Canal; and for amending the several Acts of His present Majesty, relating to the said Canals. (Repealed by Ellesmere and Chester Canal Act 1827 (c.cii))
Waterbeach Level Drainage Act 1813	53 Geo. 3. c. lxxxi	21 May 1813
Margate Improvement Act 1813 (repealed)	53 Geo. 3. c. lxxxii	21 May 1813
(Repealed by County of Kent Act 1981 (c. xviii))
Kidderminster Improvement Act 1813 (repealed)	53 Geo. 3. c. lxxxiii	21 May 1813
(Repealed by Local Government Supplemental Act 1870 (33 & 34 Vict. c. cxiv))
Poplar and Blackwell Improvement Act 1813 (repealed)	53 Geo. 3. c. lxxxiv	21 May 1813
(Repealed by London Government (Borough of Poplar) Order in Council 1901 (SR&O 1901/220))
St. Mary Abbotts Kensington Burial Ground Act 1813	53 Geo. 3. c. lxxxv	21 May 1813
Clapham Chapel of Ease Act 1813 (repealed)	53 Geo. 3. c. lxxxvi	21 May 1813
(Repealed by London Government (Borough of Wandsworth) Order in Council 1901 (SR&O 1901/222))
Southwark Bridge Act 1813	53 Geo. 3. c. lxxxvii	21 May 1813
An Act to amend an Act, passed in the Fifty first Year of His present Majesty, (Note: Southwark Bridge Act 1811 (51 Geo. 3. c. clxvi)) for erecting a Bridge over the River Thames, from the City of London to the opposite Bank in the Parish of Saint Saviour, in the County of Surry.
Kirkcaldy Two Pennies Scots Act 1813 (repealed)	53 Geo. 3. c. lxxxviii	21 May 1813
(Repealed by Kirkcaldy Corporation Order Confirmation Act 1939 (2 & 3 Geo. 6. c. vi))
Road from Peterborough to Thorney Act 1813	53 Geo. 3. c. lxxxix	21 May 1813
Highways from Kensington Act 1813 (repealed)	53 Geo. 3. c. xc	21 May 1813
An Act to alter and enlarge the Powers of Three Acts of His present Majesty (Note: Middlesex Roads Act 1766 (7 Geo. 3. c. 88)) (Note: Brentford Road Act 1791 (31 Geo. 3. c. 124)) (Note: Middlesex Roads Act 1795 (35 Geo. 3. c. 134)) for repairing the Highways from that Part of Counter's Bridge which lies in the Parish of Kensington, in the County of Middlesex leading through the Towns of Brentford and Hounslow, to the Powder Mills in the Road to Staines, and to Cranford Bridge, in the Road to Colnbrook, and several other Roads in the said County, so far as the same relate to the New District of Road therein described. (Repealed by Metropolis Roads Act 1826 (7 Geo. 4. c. cxlii))
Roads from Cornhill Burn Act 1813 (repealed)	53 Geo. 3. c. xci	21 May 1813
(Repealed by Ford and Lowick Turnpikes Act 1835 (c.xxvii))
Isle of Wight Highway Act 1813 or the Isle of Wight Roads Act 1813 (repealed)	53 Geo. 3. c. xcii	21 May 1813
An Act for amending the Roads and Highways in the Isle of Wight. (Repealed by Isle of Wight Highways Act 1925 (15 & 16 Geo. 5. c. xiii))
Hitchin and Bedford Roads and Branches Act 1813 (repealed)	53 Geo. 3. c. xciii	21 May 1813
(Repealed by Hitchin, Shefford, Henlow and Gorford Bridge Roads Act 1835 (c.xxxix))
Stumpcross and Newmarket Heath Road Act 1813 (repealed)	53 Geo. 3. c. xciv	21 May 1813
(Repealed by Stumpcross Roads Act 1841 (c.xx))
Road from Downham Market Act 1813 (repealed)	53 Geo. 3. c. xcv	21 May 1813
(Repealed by Downham Market, Barton and Devil's Ditch Road Act 1832 (c.xxi))
Steeple Ashton Inclosure Act 1813	53 Geo. 3. c. xcvi	21 May 1813
An Act for inclosing Lands in the Parish of Steeple Ashton, in the County of Wilts.
Riddell's Estate Act 1813	53 Geo. 3. c. xcvii	21 May 1813
Brasenose College Oxford and Shaw's Estate Act 1813	53 Geo. 3. c. xcviii	21 May 1813
Holden's Estate Act 1813	53 Geo. 3. c. xcix	21 May 1813
Barker's Estate Act 1813	53 Geo. 3. c. c	21 May 1813
An Act for vesting certain Estates in the County of Westmorland in James Adam Esquire, discharged of the Uses of the Will of the Reverend James Barker, deceased; and for settling other Estates in lieu thereof; and for other Purposes.
Thurgoland Inclosure Act 1813	53 Geo. 3. c. ci	21 May 1813
An Act for inclosing Lands in the Manor of Thurgoland, in the County of York.
Uphill Inclosure Act 1813	53 Geo. 3. c. cii	21 May 1813
An Act for inclosing Lands in the Parish of Uphill, in the County of Somerset.
Buckden Inclosure Act 1813	53 Geo. 3. c. ciii	21 May 1813
An Act for inclosing Lands in the Parish of Buckden, in the County of Huntington.
Wike Inclosure Act 1813	53 Geo. 3. c. civ	21 May 1813
An Act for inclosing Lands in the Manor and Township of Wike, in the County of York.
Shap Inclosure Act 1813	53 Geo. 3. c. cv	21 May 1813
An Act for repealing an Act passed in the Seventh Year of the Reign of His present Majesty, intituled "An Act for dividing and inclosing the Open Commons in the Manor of Shap, in the County of Westmorland;" (Note: Shap Inclosure Act 1767 (7 Geo. 3. c. 88 Pr.)) and for granting other Powers for dividing, allotting and inclosing the said Lands and Grounds.
Stukeley Inclosure Act 1813	53 Geo. 3. c. cvi	21 May 1813
An Act for inclosing, and exonerating from Tithes, Lands in the Parish of Stukeley, in the County of Huntingdon
Waterbeach Inclosure Act 1813	53 Geo. 3. c. cvii	21 May 1813
An Act for inclosing Lands in the Parish of Waterbeach, in the County of Cambridge
Elvetham Inclosure Act 1813	53 Geo. 3. c. cviii	21 May 1813
An Act for inclosing Lands in the Parish of Elvetham, in the County of Southampton
Whittington and Newton with Docker Inclosures Act 1813	53 Geo. 3. c. cix	21 May 1813
An Act for inclosing Lands within the Townships of Whittington and Newton with Docker, in the Parish of Whittington, in the County Palatine of Lancaster.
Swedish Government Compensation Distribution Act 1813	53 Geo. 3. c. cx	3 June 1813
An Act to provide for the Distribution, Payment and Application of certain Monies and Effects, refunded or paid, or to be refunded or paid, by or on Behalf of the Government of Sweden, among the Persons having Claims thereon in consequence of certain Detentions, Sequestrations and Condemnations by that Government, in the Years One thousand eight hundred and ten, One thousand eight hundred and eleven, and One thousand eight hundred and twelve.
Cork City and County Rates Act 1813	53 Geo. 3. c. cxi	3 June 1813
St. Leonard Shoreditch Improvement Act 1813	53 Geo. 3. c. cxii	3 June 1813
Bethnal Green Improvement Act 1813 (repealed)	53 Geo. 3. c. cxiii	3 June 1813
(Repealed by London Government (Borough of Southwark) Order in Council 1901 (SR&O 1901/275))
St. George's Church, Everton Act 1813	53 Geo. 3. c. cxiv	3 June 1813
Hanley Market Act 1813 (repealed)	53 Geo. 3. c. cxv	3 June 1813
(Repealed by Local Government Board's Provisional Order Confirmation (No. 3) Act 1908 (8 Edw. 7. c. clxiv))
King's Bench, Marshalsea and Fleet Prisons (Relief of Poor Prisoners) Act 1813 (repealed)	53 Geo. 3. c. cxvi	3 June 1813
An Act to amend an Act, passed in the Fifty second Year of His present Majesty, intituled "An Act to enable Justices of the Peace to order Parochial Relief to Prisoners confined under Mesne Process for Debt, in such Gaols as are not County Gaols," (Note: Relief of Debtors in Prison Act 1812 (52 Geo. 3. c. 160)) so far as regards the Parish of Saint George the Martyr, in the Borough of Southwark, in the County of Surry and the Parish of Saint Bridget otherwise Saint Bride, in the City of London. (Repealed by Statute Law (Repeals) Act 2008 (c. 12))
Perth Gaol Act 1813	53 Geo. 3. c. cxvii	3 June 1813
An Act for erecting and maintaining a new Gaol for the County and City of Perth; and for other Purposes relating thereto.
Warrington Improvement and Bridewell Act 1813 (repealed)	53 Geo. 3. c. cxviii	3 June 1813
(Repealed by Warrington Improvement and Market Act 1854 (c.viii))
Kennet and Avon Canal Company and River Kennet Navigation Act 1813 or the Kennet Navigation Act 1813	53 Geo. 3. c. cxix	3 June 1813
An Act to enable the Kennet and Avon Canal Company to raise a further Sum of Money to purchase the Shares of the River Kennet Navigation; and to amend the several Acts passed for making the said Canal.
Wilts and Berks Canal Navigation Act 1813 (repealed)	53 Geo. 3. c. cxx	3 June 1813
An Act for explaining and amending an Act of His present Majesty, (Note: Wilts and Berks Canal Act 1795 (35 Geo. 3. c. 52)) for making a Navigable Canal from the River Thames or Isis, near Abingdon in the County of Berks, to join the Kennet and Avon Canal, near Trowbridge in the County of Wilts; and certain Navigable Cuts. (Repealed by Wilts and Berks Canal Navigation Act 1821 (c.xcvii))
Abergele, St. Asaph, Rhydlan, Diserth and Meliden Drainage and Inclosures Act 1813	53 Geo. 3. c. cxxi	3 June 1813
Liverpool Water Act 1813 (repealed)	53 Geo. 3. c. cxxii	3 June 1813
An Act for enlarging the Powers of Two Acts of His present Majesty, (Note: Liverpool Water Supply Act 1799 (39 Geo. 3. c. xxxvi)) (Note: Liverpool Water Act 1810 (50 Geo. 3. c. clxv)) for better supplying the Town and Port of Liverpool with Water. (Repealed by Liverpool Corporation Act 1921 (11 & 12 Geo. 5. c. lxxiv))
Wexford (Slaney) Bridge Act 1813	53 Geo. 3. c. cxxiii	3 June 1813
Ferry Carrig (Slaney) Bridge Act 1813	53 Geo. 3. c. cxxiv	3 June 1813
Firth of Forth Bridges Act 1813	53 Geo. 3. c. cxxv	3 June 1813
Edinburgh Bakers' Widows' Fund Act 1813	53 Geo. 3. c. cxxvi	3 June 1813
Colneis and Carlford Poor Relief Act 1813 (repealed)	53 Geo. 3. c. cxxvii	3 June 1813
(Repealed by Statute Law (Repeals) Act 2013 (c. 2))
Road to Studley Bridge Act 1813	53 Geo. 3. c. cxxviii	3 June 1813
Road from Durham to Tyne Bridge Act 1813 (repealed)	53 Geo. 3. c. cxxix	3 June 1813
(Repealed by Road from Durham to Tyne Bridge Act 1824 (c.cii))
Norwich and Great Yarmouth Road Act 1813 (repealed)	53 Geo. 3. c. cxxx	3 June 1813
An Act to continue and amend Two Acts of the Ninth (Note: Norwich to Yarmouth Road Act 1769 (9 Geo. 3. c. 68)) and Thirtieth (Note: Norwich to Yarmouth Road Act 1790 (30 Geo. 3. c. 86)) Years of His present Majesty, for amending the Road from Bishopsgate Bridge, in the City of Norwich, to a Stone formerly called the Two Mile Stone, where the Norwich Road joins the Caister Causeway, Two Miles and a Half short of the Town of Great Yarmouth. (Repealed by Road from Norwich to the Caister Causeway Act 1831 (c.lxv))
Warrington and Wigan Road Act 1813 (repealed)	53 Geo. 3. c. cxxxi	3 June 1813
(Repealed by Warrington and Wigan Road Act 1833 (c.lxxiv))
Shrewsbury to Wrexham Road Act 1813	53 Geo. 3. c. cxxxii	3 June 1813
An Act for enlarging the Term and Powers of an Act of King George the Second, (Note: Shrewsbury and Wrexham Road Act 1756 (29 Geo. 2. c. 93)) and an Act of His present Majesty, (Note: Denbigh Roads Act 1788 (28 Geo. 3. c. 112)) for repairing the Road from Shrewsbury to Wrexham, and several other Roads in the Counties of Denbigh, Chester, and Flint, so far as relates to the Road in the County of Flint, called The Mold District.
Road from Neat Enstone and Chipping Norton Turnpike Road to Weston-on-the-Green (Oxfordshire) Act 1813	53 Geo. 3. c. cxxxiii	3 June 1813
Rochdale and Edenfield Road Act 1813 (repealed)	53 Geo. 3. c. cxxxiv	3 June 1813
(Repealed by Rochdale and Edenfield Road Act 1833 (c.lxxxiv))
Road from Shelton to Blakeley Lane Head and from Bucknall to Weston Coyney (Staffordshire) Act 1813	53 Geo. 3. c. cxxxv	3 June 1813
Roads, Bridges and Statute Labour in Ross and Cromarty Act 1813	53 Geo. 3. c. cxxxvi	3 June 1813
Roads from Maidenhead Bridge (Third District) Act 1813 (repealed)	53 Geo. 3. c. cxxxvii	3 June 1813
An Act for enlarging the Powers of an Act of His present Majesty, (Note: Roads from Maidenhead Bridge to Reading and to Henley Bridge Act 1806 (46 Geo. 3. c. cxlv)) for repairing the Roads from Maidenhead Bridge to Reading, and from the said Bridge to Henley Bridge (Note: Henley Bridge in Henley-on-Thames. 51°32′15″N 0°54′01″W) in the County of Berks, so far as relates to the Third District of the said Roads. (Repealed by Henley Bridge and Bisham Road Act 1826 (c.lxxvii))
Lloyd's Estate Act 1813	53 Geo. 3. c. cxxxviii	3 June 1813
Worcester Bishopric and Dean and Chapter Estates Act 1813	53 Geo. 3. c. cxxxix	3 June 1813
Partridge's Estate Act 1813	53 Geo. 3. c. cxl	3 June 1813
An Act for effecting the Sale of certain Parts of the Estates devised by the Will of Henry Partridge Esquire, deceased; and for laying out the Money arising by such Sales, together with the clear Money produced by the Sale of certain other Parts of the said Estates, directed to be sold by an Act passed in the Forty ninth Year of the Reign of His present Majesty, (Note: Partridge's Estate Act 1809 (49 Geo. 3. c. clxxvii)) in the Purchase of other Estates, and for settling the same to the like Uses.
Dundraw Inclosure Act 1813	53 Geo. 3. c. cxli	3 June 1813
An Act for inclosing Lands in Dundraw, in the County of Cumberland.
Feltwell Inclosure Act 1813	53 Geo. 3. c. cxlii	3 June 1813
An Act for inclosing Lands in the Township of Feltwell, in the County of Norfolk.
Clirow Inclosure Act 1813	53 Geo. 3. c. cxliii	3 June 1813
An Act for inclosing Lands in the Parish of Clirow, in the County of Radnor, and extinguishing Vicarial Tithes in the said Parish.
Turweston Inclosure Act 1813	53 Geo. 3. c. cxliv	3 June 1813
An Act for inclosing Lands in the Manor and Parish of Turweston, in the County of Buckingham.
Whitwell Inclosure Act 1813	53 Geo. 3. c. cxlv	3 June 1813
An Act for inclosing Lands in the Parish of Whitwell, in the County of Derby.
Whitney Inclosure Act 1813	53 Geo. 3. c. cxlvi	3 June 1813
An Act for inclosing Lands in the Manor and Parish of Whitney, in the County of Hereford.
Stockton Inclosure Act 1813	53 Geo. 3. c. cxlvii	3 June 1813
An Act for inclosing Lands in the Township of Stockton, in the County of York.
Downton Inclosure Act 1813	53 Geo. 3. c. cxlviii	3 June 1813
An Act for inclosing Lands in the Parish of Downton, in the County of Wilts.
Llandyrnog and Llangwyfan Inclosures Act 1813	53 Geo. 3. c. cxlix	3 June 1813
An Act for inclosing Lands in Llandyrnog and Llangwyfan, in the County of Denbigh.
Cascob, Ednol and Kinnerton Inclosures Act 1813	53 Geo. 3. c. cl	3 June 1813
An Act for inclosing Lands in the Parish of Cascob, and Townships of Ednol and Kinnerton, in the County of Radnor.
Aughton Inclosure Act 1813	53 Geo. 3. c. cli	3 June 1813
An Act for inclosing Lands in the Township of Aughton in the Parish of Aughton, in the County Palatine of Lancaster.
Milborne Port Inclosure Act 1813	53 Geo. 3. c. clii	3 June 1813
An Act for amending an Act of His present Majesty (Note: Milborne Port Inclosure Act 1812 (52 Geo. 3. c. 16 Pr.)) for inclosing Lands in the Parish of Milborne Port, in the County of Somerset; and for transferring Borough Rights from certain Lands in the same Parish to other Lands therein, the better to effectuate such Inclosure.
Kirkburton Inclosure Act 1813	53 Geo. 3. c. cliii	3 June 1813
An Act for inclosing Lands in the Manor and Township of Kirkburton, in the County of York.
Spalford and Wigsley Inclosures Act 1813	53 Geo. 3. c. cliv	3 June 1813
An Act for inclosing Lands in the Township of Spalford and Wigsley, in the County of Nottingham.
South London Water Works Act 1813 (repealed)	53 Geo. 3. c. clv	22 June 1813
An Act to enable the Company of Proprietors of the South London Water Works to raise a further Sum of Money, and to alter and amend the Powers of an Act passed in the Forty fifth Year of His present Majesty, (Note: South London Waterworks Act 1805 (45 Geo. 3. c. cxix)) for making the said Water Works. (Repealed by Vauxhall and Southwark Water Act 1845 (c.lxix))
Liverpool Improvement Act 1813 (repealed)	53 Geo. 3. c. clvi	22 June 1813
(Repealed by Mersey Dock Acts Consolidation Act 1858 (21 & 22 Vict. c. xcii))
Aberdeen Harbour Act 1813 (repealed)	53 Geo. 3. c. clvii	22 June 1813
(Repealed by Aberdeen Harbour Act 1829 (c.xxxiv))
Wexford Harbour Act 1813	53 Geo. 3. c. clviii	22 June 1813
North Kelsey Drainage and Inclosure Act 1813	53 Geo. 3. c. clix	22 June 1813
Everton, Scaftworth, Gringeley-on-the-Hill, Misterton and Walkeringham Drainage Act 1813 (repealed)	53 Geo. 3. c. clx	22 June 1813
An Act for enlarging the Powers of Two Acts (Note: Everton, etc. (Nottinghamshire) Drainage, etc. Act 1796 (36 Geo. 3. c. 99)) (Note: Everton, Scaftworth, Gringley-on-the-Hill, Misterton and Walkeringham Drainage Act 1801 (41 Geo. 3. (U.K.) c. cxxxvi)) of His present Majesty, for embanking and draining certain Low Lands and Grounds in the Parishes or Townships of Everton, Scaftworth, Gringley on the Hill, Misterton and Walkeringham, in the County of Nottingham. (Repealed by Everton, &c. Drainage Act 1860 (c.cliv))
Hatfield Chase Drainage Act 1813	53 Geo. 3. c. clxi	22 June 1813
St. Giles Camberwell Parochial Rates, Workhouse, Cemetery, &c. Act 1813 (repealed)	53 Geo. 3. c. clxii	22 June 1813
(Repealed by London Government (Borough of Camberwell) Order in Council 1901 (SR&O 1901/213))
St. Marylebone Improvement Act 1813 (repealed)	53 Geo. 3. c. clxiii	22 June 1813
(Repealed by London Government (Borough of St. Marylebone) Order in Council 1901 (SR&O 1901/272))
Chepping Wycombe Improvement Act 1813 (repealed)	53 Geo. 3. c. clxiv	22 June 1813
(Repealed by Chepping Wycombe Improvement Act 1874 (c.cxxi))
Road to Kilburn Bridge, and Road from Islington to the Edgware Road Act 1813	53 Geo. 3. c. clxv	22 June 1813
Knightley's Estate Act 1813 (repealed)	53 Geo. 3. c. clxvi	22 June 1813
(Repealed by Knightley's Estate Act 1818 (58 Geo. 3. c. 31))
Whittaker's Estate Act 1813	53 Geo. 3. c. clxvii	22 June 1813
Churchill's Estate Act 1813	53 Geo. 3. c. clxviii	22 June 1813
Harrison's Estate Act 1813	53 Geo. 3. c. clxix	22 June 1813
Phillipps' Estate Act 1813	53 Geo. 3. c. clxx	22 June 1813
An Act for vesting Part of the settled Estates of Thomas John Phillips, of Newport House in the County of Cornwall, Esquire, an Infant, in Trustees, to be sold; and for investing the clear Monies thence arising, under the Direction of the High Court of Chancery, in the Purchase of other Estates, to be settled in lieu thereof, and to the same Uses.
Popham's Estate Act 1813	53 Geo. 3. c. clxxi	22 June 1813
East Bedfont with Hatton Inclosure Act 1813	53 Geo. 3. c. clxxii	22 June 1813
An Act for inclosing Lands in the Manor of East Bedfont with Hatton, in the Parish of East Bedfont, in the County of Middlesex.
Undermilbeck Inclosure Act 1813	53 Geo. 3. c. clxxiii	22 June 1813
An Act for inclosing Lands within the Township of Undermilbeck, in the Parishes of Windermere and Kirkby in Kendal, in the County of Westmoreland.
Isleworth, Heston and Twickenham Inclosures Act 1813	53 Geo. 3. c. clxxiv	22 June 1813
Burghwallis Inclosure Act 1813	53 Geo. 3. c. clxxv	22 June 1813
An Act for inclosing Lands in Burghwallis, in the County of York.
Calne, Calstone-Wellington and Blackland Inclosures Act 1813	53 Geo. 3. c. clxxvi	22 June 1813
Crowle, Eastoft and Ealand Inclosures Act 1813	53 Geo. 3. c. clxxvii	22 June 1813
Winterbourne Monckton Inclosure Act 1813	53 Geo. 3. c. clxxviii	22 June 1813
An Act for inclosing Lands in the Parish of Winterbourne Monckton, in the County of Wilts.
Lee's Hemp and Flax Preparation Invention Act 1813	53 Geo. 3. c. clxxix	2 July 1813
Tewkesbury Gaol Act 1813 (repealed)	53 Geo. 3. c. clxxx	2 July 1813
An Act for erecting a new Gaol House of Correction, and Penitentiary House, in the Borough of Tewkesbury, in the County of Gloucester. (Repealed by Statute Law (Repeals) Act 2008 (c. 12))
Thames and Severn Canal Act 1813	53 Geo. 3. c. clxxxi	2 July 1813
An Act for altering and amending an Act made in the Twenty third Year of the Reign of His present Majesty, (Note: Thames and Severn Canal Act 1783 (23 Geo. 3. c. 38)) for making and maintaining the Thames and Severn Canal Navigation.
North Wilts Canal Act 1813 (repealed)	53 Geo. 3. c. clxxxii	2 July 1813
An Act for making and maintaining a Navigable Canal, from the Wilts and Berks Canal, in the Parish of Swindon, in the County of Wilts, to communicate with the Thames and Severn Canal in the Parish of Latton, in the same County. (Repealed by Wilts and Berks Canal Navigation Act 1821 (c.xcvii))
Bury, Loughor and Lliedi Rivers Navigation Act 1813	53 Geo. 3. c. clxxxiii	2 July 1813
An Act for the Improvement of the Navigation of the Rivers Bury, Loughor and Lliedi, in the Counties of Carmarthan and Glamorgan.
Strand Bridge Act 1813 (repealed)	53 Geo. 3. c. clxxxiv	2 July 1813
An Act for altering, enlarging, and extending the Powers of an Act of His present Majesty, (Note: Strand Bridge Act 1809 (49 Geo. 3. c. cxci)) for building a Bridge over the River Thames, at the Precinct of the Savoy, or near thereunto; and making Roads and Avenues to communicate therewith, in the Counties of Middlesex and Surrey. (Repealed by Local Law (Greater London Council and Inner London Boroughs) Order 1965 (SI 1965/540))
Fitzwilliam Square, Dublin, Improvement Act 1813	53 Geo. 3. c. clxxxv	2 July 1813
An Act for inclosing, lighting and improving Fitzwilliam Square, in the County of the City of Dublin.
Roads in Montgomery, Merioneth and Salop Act 1813 (repealed)	53 Geo. 3. c. clxxxvi	2 July 1813
(Repealed by Roads in Montgomery, Merioneth, Salop. and Denbigh Act 1834 (c.xxxi))
Roads from Bowes and from Maiden Castle Act 1813	53 Geo. 3. c. clxxxvii	2 July 1813
Roads from Maidstone to Cranbrook Act 1813	53 Geo. 3. c. clxxxviii	2 July 1813
Earl of Dartmouth's Estate Act 1813	53 Geo. 3. c. clxxxix	2 July 1813
Wellesley and Hodges Estates Act 1813	53 Geo. 3. c. cxc	2 July 1813
An Act for enabling the Honourable and Reverend Gerald Valerian Wellesley, Doctor in Divinity, and the Reverend Richard Hodges to grant Building Leases, of several undivided Shares in a Piece of Land, called Chelsea Common, in the Parish of Saint Luke, Chelsea, in the County of Middlesex, pursuant to an Agreement entered into for that Purpose
Camberwell Parish and Glebe Lands Act 1813	53 Geo. 3. c. cxci	2 July 1813
Saunders' Estate Act 1813	53 Geo. 3. c. cxcii	2 July 1813
Campion's Marriage Settlement Act 1813	53 Geo. 3. c. cxciii	2 July 1813
Duncombe's Estate Act 1813	53 Geo. 3. c. cxciv	2 July 1813
Sinclair's Estate Act 1813	53 Geo. 3. c. cxcv	2 July 1813
Lee's Estate Act 1813	53 Geo. 3. c. cxcvi	2 July 1813
Holt's Estate Act 1813	53 Geo. 3. c. cxcvii	2 July 1813
Withington Inclosure Act 1813	53 Geo. 3. c. cxcviii	2 July 1813
Bicester and Aylesbury Road Act 1813 (repealed)	53 Geo. 3. c. cxcix	6 July 1813
(Repealed by Bicester and Aylesbury Road Act 1833 (c.xxiv))
Bicester and Aynho Road and Branch Act 1813	53 Geo. 3. c. cc	6 July 1813
An Act for enlarging the Term and Powers of an Act of His present Majesty, (Note: Bicester to Aynho Road Act 1791 (31 Geo. 3. c. 103)) for repairing the Road from the Market Place in Bicester, in the County of Oxford, to the Buckingham Turnpike Road in Aynho, in the County of Northampton; and for extending the Powers of the said Act to an adjoining Branch of Road.
Wainfleet St. Mary Inclosure Act 1813	53 Geo. 3. c. cci	7 July 1813
Seabright's Estate Act 1813	53 Geo. 3. c. ccii	7 July 1813
Hall's Estate Act 1813	53 Geo. 3. c. cciii	7 July 1813
Gibson's Estate Act 1813	53 Geo. 3. c. cciv	7 July 1813
Lowndes' Estate Act 1813	53 Geo. 3. c. ccv	7 July 1813
Hope Assurance Company Act 1813	53 Geo. 3. c. ccvi	10 July 1813
Eagle Insurance Company Act 1813	53 Geo. 3. c. ccvii	10 July 1813
Sussex Roads Act 1813	53 Geo. 3. c. ccviii	10 July 1813
Archbishop of Canterbury's Estate Act 1813	53 Geo. 3. c. ccix	10 July 1813
Viscount Bateman's Estate Act 1813	53 Geo. 3. c. ccx	12 July 1813
An Act for vesting certain Estates devised by the Right Honourable John Viscount Bateman, deceased, in Trustees, to be sold, and for laying out the Monies arising therefrom, under the Direction of the High Court of Chancery, in the Purchase of other Estates to be settled to the same Uses.
Marine Insurance Company of Dublin Act 1813	53 Geo. 3. c. ccxi	13 July 1813
An Act to enable The Marine Insurance Company of Dublin to sue and be sued in the Name of their Secretary or Secretaries.
Phoenix Assurance Company of London Act 1813 or the Phoenix Assurance Company's Act 1813 (repealed)	53 Geo. 3. c. ccxii	20 July 1813
An Act to enable The Phoenix Assurance Company of London to sue and be sued in the Name of their Secretary or any Member. (Repealed by Phoenix Assurance Company's Act 1895 (58 & 59 Vict. c. lxxiii))
Earl of Leicester's Hospital, Warwick Act 1813 (repealed)	53 Geo. 3. c. ccxiii	20 July 1813
An Act for altering the Rules, Statutes and Ordinances of the Hospital of Robert Earl of Leicester, in Warwick; and for enabling the Master and Brethren of the said Hospital to raise Money on the Security of the Estates thereof, in order to provide for the Reception of additional Brethren therein. (Repealed by Statute Law (Repeals) Act 2013 (c. 2))
River Cam Navigation Act 1813 (repealed)	53 Geo. 3. c. ccxiv	21 July 1813
An Act for extending and amending an Act of Queen Anne, (Note: River Cam Navigation Act 1702 (1 Ann. St. 2 c. 11)) for making the River Cham more navigable from Clayhithe Ferry to the Queen's Mill, in the County of Cambridge. (Repealed by River Cam Navigation Act 1851 (14 & 15 Vict. c. xcii))
Norwich Union Life Insurance Society Act 1813 (repealed)	53 Geo. 3. c. ccxv	21 July 1813
An Act to enable The Norwich Union Society for the Insurance of Lives and Survivorships to sue in the Name of their Secretary, and to be sued in the Names of their Directors, Treasurers and Secretary. (Repealed by Norwich Union Life Insurance Society Act 1891 (c.xxxvi))
Norwich Union Fire Insurance Society Act 1813	53 Geo. 3. c. ccxvi	21 July 1813
An Act to enable The Norwich Union Society for Insurance against Loss by Fire to sue in the Name of their Secretary, and to be sued in the Names of their Directors, Treasurers and Secretary.

=== Private acts ===
Short title	Citation	Royal assent
Long title
Cotterstock cum Glapthorn Inclosure Act 1813	53 Geo. 3. c. 1 Pr.	24 November 1812 (Note: Start of session)
An Act for inclosing Lands in the Parish of Cotterstock cum Glapthorn, in the County of Northampton.
Greystoke Inclosure Act 1813	53 Geo. 3. c. 2 Pr.	24 November 1812
Marston Trussell Inclosure Act 1813	53 Geo. 3. c. 3 Pr.	24 November 1812
Eastnor Inclosure Act 1813	53 Geo. 3. c. 4 Pr.	24 November 1812
Greenford Inclosure Act 1813	53 Geo. 3. c. 5 Pr.	24 November 1812
Hanwell Inclosure Act 1813	53 Geo. 3. c. 6 Pr.	24 November 1812
An Act for inclosing Lands in the Parish of Hanwell, in the County of Middlesex.
Hornsey (Middlesex) Inclosure Act 1813	53 Geo. 3. c. 7 Pr.	24 November 1812
Windeler's Naturalization Act 1813	53 Geo. 3. c. 8 Pr.	24 November 1812
An Act for naturalizing Johan Diederich Windeler.
Swinbrooke (Oxfordshire) Inclosure etc. Act 1813	53 Geo. 3. c. 9 Pr.	24 November 1812
Clehonger Inclosure Act 1813	53 Geo. 3. c. 10 Pr.	24 November 1812
An Act for inclosing Lands in the Parish of Clehonger, in the County of Hereford.
Great Stanmore Inclosure Act 1813	53 Geo. 3. c. 11 Pr.	24 November 1812
North Piddle (Worcestershire) Inclosure Act 1813	53 Geo. 3. c. 12 Pr.	24 November 1812
Warter Inclosure Act 1813	53 Geo. 3. c. 13 Pr.	24 November 1812
An Act to explain and amend an Act of His present Majesty, (Note: Warter Inclosure Act 1794 (34 Geo. 3. c. 3 Pr.)) for inclosing Lands within the Lordship and Township of Warter, in the East Riding of the County of York.
Sockbridge, Yanwath, and Eamont Bridge (Westmorland) Inclosure Act 1813	53 Geo. 3. c. 14 Pr.	24 November 1812
Little Shelford (Cambridge) Inclosure Act 1813	53 Geo. 3. c. 15 Pr.	24 November 1812
Salwarp Inclosure Act 1813	53 Geo. 3. c. 16 Pr.	24 November 1812
Upton Common, Idsall or Shifnal (Salop.) Inclosure Act 1813	53 Geo. 3. c. 17 Pr.	24 November 1812
Henry and Mary Burnet's Marriage Settlement Act 1813	53 Geo. 3. c. 18 Pr.	24 November 1812
Edward and Elizabeth Webb's Estate Act 1813	53 Geo. 3. c. 19 Pr.	24 November 1812
Townhill or Shamblehurst (Hampshire) Inclosure Act 1813	53 Geo. 3. c. 20 Pr.	24 November 1812
An Act for inclosing Lands in the Manor of Townhill otherwise Shamblehurst, in the Parish of South Stoneham, in the County of Southampton.
Seething, Kirstead, Mundham, and Sisland (Norfolk) Inclosure Act 1813	53 Geo. 3. c. 21 Pr.	24 November 1812
Wramplingham Inclosure Act 1813	53 Geo. 3. c. 22 Pr.	24 November 1812
Croxton (Norfolk) Inclosure Act 1813	53 Geo. 3. c. 23 Pr.	24 November 1812
Kilburn (Yorkshire) Inclosure Act 1813	53 Geo. 3. c. 24 Pr.	24 November 1812
Laleham Burway Inclosure Act 1813	53 Geo. 3. c. 25 Pr.	24 November 1812
An Act for inclosing certain Land called Laleham Burway, in the Parish of Laleham, in the County of Middlesex, or in the Parish of Chertsey, in the County of Surry, or one of them.
Warminghurst, Ashington, and Chankton (Sussex) Inclosure Act 1813	53 Geo. 3. c. 26 Pr.	24 November 1812
Eartham (Sussex) Inclosure Act 1813	53 Geo. 3. c. 27 Pr.	24 November 1812
Farlington (Yorkshire) Inclosure Act 1813	53 Geo. 3. c. 28 Pr.	24 November 1812
Icklingham (Suffolk) Inclosure Act 1813	53 Geo. 3. c. 29 Pr.	24 November 1812
Whepstead Inclosure Act 1813	53 Geo. 3. c. 30 Pr.	24 November 1812
An Act for dividing the Commons and Waste Grounds within the Parish of Whepstead, in the County of Suffolk.
Chudleigh (Devon) Inclosure Act 1813	53 Geo. 3. c. 31 Pr.	24 November 1812
Bluntisham with Earith and Colne (Huntingdonshire) Inclosure Act 1813	53 Geo. 3. c. 32 Pr.	24 November 1812
Lord Blantyre's Estate Act 1813	53 Geo. 3. c. 33 Pr.	24 November 1812
Kinmount Estate Act 1813	53 Geo. 3. c. 34 Pr.	24 November 1812
Harvey Kimpton's Estate Act 1813	53 Geo. 3. c. 35 Pr.	24 November 1812
Ledbury (Herefordshire) Inclosure Act 1813	53 Geo. 3. c. 36 Pr.	24 November 1812
Flyford Flavell (Worcestershire) Inclosure Act 1813	53 Geo. 3. c. 37 Pr.	24 November 1812
Great Horkesley and Rivers Hall in Boxted (Essex) Inclosure Act 1813	53 Geo. 3. c. 38 Pr.	24 November 1812
Knowle (Warwickshire) Inclosure Act 1813	53 Geo. 3. c. 39 Pr.	24 November 1812
Great Rissington (Gloucestershire) Inclosure Act 1813	53 Geo. 3. c. 40 Pr.	24 November 1812
An Act for inclosing Lands in the Parish of Great Rissington, in the County of Gloucester.
Cwmyoy and Llanthony (Monmouth) Inclosure Act 1813	53 Geo. 3. c. 41 Pr.	24 November 1812
Ebrington and Hitcoat or Hitcott (Gloucestershire) Inclosure Act 1813	53 Geo. 3. c. 42 Pr.	24 November 1812
Amberley Inclosure Act 1813	53 Geo. 3. c. 43 Pr.	24 November 1812
An Act for amending and rendering more effectual an Act of the Fiftieth Year of His present Majesty, (Note: Amberley Inclosure Act 1810 (50 Geo. 3. c. 35 Pr.)) for inclosing Lands in the Manor of Amberly, in the County of Sussex.
Much Cowarn (Herefordshire) Inclosure Act 1813	53 Geo. 3. c. 44 Pr.	24 November 1812
Fairburn (Yorkshire, West Riding) Inclosure Act 1813	53 Geo. 3. c. 45 Pr.	24 November 1812
Morley or Morley St. Buttolph or Morley St. Peter (Norfolk) Inclosure Act 1813	53 Geo. 3. c. 46 Pr.	24 November 1812
Woodton (Norfolk) Inclosure Act 1813	53 Geo. 3. c. 47 Pr.	24 November 1812
Priors Ditton (Salop.) Inclosure Act 1813	53 Geo. 3. c. 48 Pr.	24 November 1812
Chevington and Chedburgh (Suffolk) Inclosure Act 1813	53 Geo. 3. c. 49 Pr.	24 November 1812
Great Horningsheath or Horningsherth and Westley (Suffolk) Inclosure Act 1813	53 Geo. 3. c. 50 Pr.	24 November 1812
An Act for inclosing Lands in the Parishes of Great Horningsheath otherwise Horningsherth and Westley, in the County of Suffolk.
Brigham (Cumberland) Inclosure Act 1813	53 Geo. 3. c. 51 Pr.	24 November 1812
Cockermouth (Cumberland) Inclosure Act 1813	53 Geo. 3. c. 52 Pr.	24 November 1812
Setmurthy and Embleton (Cumberland) Inclosure Act 1813	53 Geo. 3. c. 53 Pr.	24 November 1812
St. John (Cumberland) Inclosure Act 1813	53 Geo. 3. c. 54 Pr.	24 November 1812
Henry Chamberlain's Divorce Act 1813	53 Geo. 3. c. 55 Pr.	24 November 1812
Archibald Campbell's Estate Act 1813	53 Geo. 3. c. 56 Pr.	24 November 1812
Carrying into effect an agreement between Reverend David Johnstone and Reverend Walter Ireland, and the Kirk Session of North Leith.	53 Geo. 3. c. 57 Pr.	24 November 1812
George Turner's Estate Act 1813	53 Geo. 3. c. 58 Pr.	24 November 1812
Rougham (Suffolk) Inclosure etc. Act 1813	53 Geo. 3. c. 59 Pr.	24 November 1812
Stretton Grandsome and Egleton (Herefordshire) Inclosure Act 1813	53 Geo. 3. c. 60 Pr.	24 November 1812
An Act for inclosing Lands in the Parish of Stretton Grandsome and Township of Egleton, in the Parish of Bishops Froome, in the County of Hereford.
Upper Elkstone (Staffordshire) Inclosure Act 1813	53 Geo. 3. c. 61 Pr.	24 November 1812
Boxted Hall (Essex) Inclosure Act 1813	53 Geo. 3. c. 62 Pr.	24 November 1812
Kennet (Cambridgeshire) Inclosure Act 1813	53 Geo. 3. c. 63 Pr.	24 November 1812
Wood Ditton (Cambridgeshire) Inclosure Act 1813	53 Geo. 3. c. 64 Pr.	24 November 1812
Eastrington (Yorkshire) Inclosure Act 1813	53 Geo. 3. c. 65 Pr.	24 November 1812
Tasburgh (Norfolk) Inclosure Act 1813	53 Geo. 3. c. 66 Pr.	24 November 1812
Newmarket (St. Mary's Parish) (Suffolk) Inclosure Act 1813	53 Geo. 3. c. 67 Pr.	24 November 1812
Reverend Benjamin Sanford's Name Act 1813	53 Geo. 3. c. 68 Pr.	24 November 1812
Robert Haldane's Estate Act 1813	53 Geo. 3. c. 69 Pr.	24 November 1812
William Morehead's Estate Act 1813	53 Geo. 3. c. 70 Pr.	24 November 1812
An Act for settling and securing the Lands and Estate of West Boreland, and others, in the County of Stirling, to and in favour of William Morehead Esquire, and the Series of Heirs entitled to take, by a certain Deed of Entail made by William Morehead Esquire, deceased, under the Conditions and Limitations in the said Deed, and for vesting in lieu thereof, certain Parts of the Lands and Barony of Herbertshire, in the said County, in certain Trustees nominated by the said William Morehead, deceased, for the Purposes of the Trust, and for empowering the Court of Session in Scotland to sell certain Parts and Portions of the said Entailed Estate of Herbertshire for Payment of the Debts contracted by the said William Morehead, deceased.
Llanfihangel Generglyn and Llanganfelin (Cardiganshire) Inclosure Act 1813	53 Geo. 3. c. 71 Pr.	24 November 1812
Westmill (Hertfordshire) Inclosure Act 1813	53 Geo. 3. c. 72 Pr.	24 November 1812
Longstanton St. Michael (Cambridgeshire) Inclosure Act 1813	53 Geo. 3. c. 73 Pr.	24 November 1812
Little Gransden (Cambridgeshire) Inclosure Act 1813	53 Geo. 3. c. 74 Pr.	24 November 1812
East Teignmouth and Dawlish (Devon) Inclosure Act 1813	53 Geo. 3. c. 75 Pr.	24 November 1812
Meldreth inclosure, and allotment of lands in Melbourn and Whaddon (Cambridgeshire).	53 Geo. 3. c. 76 Pr.	24 November 1812
Frampton upon Severn and Slimbridge (Gloucestershire) Inclosure Act 1813	53 Geo. 3. c. 77 Pr.	24 November 1812
John Willis's Name Act 1813	53 Geo. 3. c. 78 Pr.	24 November 1812
Reade's Estate Act 1813	53 Geo. 3. c. 79 Pr.	24 November 1812
An Act for vesting a Leasehold Messuage in Curzon Street, in the County of Middlesex, and other Effects, settled by the Will of Dame Harriott Reade, deceased, in Trustees, to be sold, and to lay out the Money thence arising in the Purchase of other Estates, to be settled in like manner.

=== Sources ===
- The Statutes of the United Kingdom of Great Britain and Ireland. 53 George III. 1813. Joseph Butterworth. 1813 – via Google Books.
- Journal of the House of Commons. Vol. 68. London: His Majesty's Stationery Office. pp. 3–675.
- Chronological Table of and Index to the Statutes. Vol. 1: To the End of the Session 59 Vict. Sess. 2 (1895) (13th ed.). London: Her Majesty's Stationery Office. 1896. pp. 202–206 – via Google Books.

== See also ==
- List of acts of the Parliament of the United Kingdom
