= Local Militia (Scotland) Act 1812 =

Act of the Parliament of the United Kingdom

Local Militia (Scotland) Act 1812 (Note: The citation of this act by this short title was authorised by section 1 of, and the first schedule to, the Short Titles Act 1896. Due to the repeal of those provisions it is now authorised by section 19(2) of the Interpretation Act 1978.)
- Act of Parliament
- Parliament of the United Kingdom
- Long title: An Act for amending the Laws relating to the Local Militia in Scotland.
- Citation: 52 Geo. 3. c. 68
- Territorial extent: United Kingdom

Dates
- Royal assent: 20 June 1812
- Commencement: 20 June 1812 (Note: The Acts of Parliament (Commencement) Act 1793.)
- Repealed: 1 October 1921
Other legislation
Amends	See § Repealed enactments
Repeals/revokes	See § Repealed enactments
Repealed by	Territorial Army and Militia Act 1921
Relates to	Local Militia (England) Act 1812

Status: Repealed

Text of statute as originally enacted

The Local Militia (Scotland) Act 1812 (52 Geo. 3. c. 68) was an act of the Parliament of the United Kingdom that consolidated enactments related to the local militia in Scotland.

== Provisions ==
=== Repealed enactments ===
Section 1 of the act repealed 5 enactments, listed in that section.

Citation	Short title	Description	Extent of repeal
48 Geo. 3. c. 150	Local Militia (Scotland) Act 1808	An Act for enabling His Majesty to establish a permanent Local Militia Force in Scotland, under certain Restrictions, for the Defence of the Realm.	The whole act.
49 Geo. 3. c. 48	Local Militia (Scotland) Act 1809	An Act to amend and render more effectual an Act passed in the last Session of Parliament, for enabling His Majesty to establish a Permanent Local Militia Force in Scotland, under certain Restrictions for the Defence of the Realm.	The whole act.
49 Geo. 3. c. 82	Local Militia (Great Britain) Act 1809	An Act to amend several Acts passed in the last and present Sessions of Parliament, relating to the Local Militia.	The whole act.
49 Geo. 3. c. 129	Militia (Great Britain) (No. 3) Act 1809	An Act to prevent the enlisting of Local Militia Men into the Regular Militia of any other County or Stewartry than the county or Stewartry to which they belong.	The whole act.
50 Geo. 3. c. 25	Militia (Great Britain) (No. 2) Act 1810	An act to amend several Acts, relating to the Local Militia of Great Britain.	So much as relates to the local militia.

== Subsequent developments ==
The whole act was repealed by section 4(1) of, and the second schedule to, the Territorial Army and Militia Act 1921 (11 & 12 Geo. 5. c. 37), which came into force on 1 October 1921.
