= Local Militia (England) Act 1812 =

Act of the Parliament of the United Kingdom

Local Militia (England) Act 1812 (Note: The citation of this act by this short title was authorised by section 1 of, and the first schedule to, the Short Titles Act 1896. Due to the repeal of those provisions it is now authorised by section 19(2) of the Interpretation Act 1978.)
- Act of Parliament
- Parliament of the United Kingdom
- Long title: An Act for amending the Laws relating to the Local Militia in England.
- Citation: 52 Geo. 3. c. 38
- Territorial extent: United Kingdom

Dates
- Royal assent: 20 April 1812
- Commencement: 20 April 1812 (Note: The Acts of Parliament (Commencement) Act 1793.)
- Repealed: 1 October 1921
Other legislation
Amends	See § Repealed enactments
Repeals/revokes	See § Repealed enactments
Amended by	Local Militia (Scotland) Act 1812
Repealed by	Territorial Army and Militia Act 1921

Status: Repealed

Text of statute as originally enacted

The Local Militia (England) Act 1812 (52 Geo. 3. c. 38) was an act of the Parliament of the United Kingdom that consolidated enactments related to the local militia in England.

== Provisions ==
=== Repealed enactments ===
Section 1 of the act repealed 5 enactments, listed in that section. The repeal did not affect any commission already granted under the repealed acts, and persons to whom such commissions had been granted could act under this act as they might have acted under the former acts. The Local Militia already raised under the act of the forty-eighth year of the King's reign remained subject to the provisions of this act, and serjeants, corporals, drummers and private Local Militia men then serving were to continue to serve for the same length of time, and remain liable to the same penalties, as if this act had not been made.

Citation	Short title	Description	Extent of repeal
48 Geo. 3. c. 111	Local Militia (England) Act 1808	An Act for enabling His Majesty to establish a permanent Local Militia Force, under certain Restrictions, for the Defence of the Realm.	The whole act.
49 Geo. 3. c. 40	Local Militia (England) Act 1809	An Act to amend and render more effectual an Act, passed in the last Session of Parliament, for enabling His Majesty to establish a permanent Local Militia Force, under certain Restrictions, for the Defence of the Realm.	The whole act.
49 Geo. 3. c. 82	Local Militia (Great Britain) Act 1809	An Act to amend several Acts passed in the last and present Sessions of Parliament, relating to the Local Militia.	The whole act.
49 Geo. 3. c. 129	Militia (Great Britain) (No. 3) Act 1809	An Act to prevent the enlisting of Local Militia Men into the Regular Militia of any other County or Stewartry than the county or Stewartry to which they belong.	The whole act.
50 Geo. 3. c. 25	Militia (Great Britain) (No. 2) Act 1810	An Act to amend several Acts relating to the Local Militia of Great Britain.	So much as relates to the Local Militia.

== Subsequent developments ==
The whole act was repealed by section 4 of, and the second schedule to, the Territorial Army and Militia Act 1921 (11 & 12 Geo. 5. c. 37), which came into force on 1 October 1921.
