= Public Libraries Act =

Stock short title used for legislation

Public Libraries Act—sometimes simply Libraries Act—is a stock short title used in the United Kingdom and Canada for legislation ("Acts of Parliament") relating to public libraries.

== Canada ==
In Canada, public libraries are local jurisdiction, with authority from provincial/territorial legislation.

- Canada (federal library) — Library and Archives of Canada Act (S.C. 2004, c. 11)
- Alberta — Libraries Act, RSA 2000, c. L-11
- British Columbia — Library Act, RSBC 1996, c. 264
- Manitoba — Public Libraries Act, CCSM, c. P220
- New Brunswick — New Brunswick Public Libraries Act, RSNB 2011, c. 194
- Newfoundland and Labrador — Public Libraries Act, RSNL 1990, c. P-40
- Northwest Territories — Public Libraries Act, SNWT 2009, c. 7
- Nova Scotia — Libraries Act, RSNS 1989, c. 254
- Nunavut — Library Act, RSNWT (Nu) 1988, c. L-7
- Ontario — Public Libraries Act, RSO 1990, c. P.44
- Prince Edward Island — Public Libraries Act, RSPEI 1988, c. P-31.1
- Saskatchewan — Public Libraries Act, 1996, SS 1996, c, P-39.2
- Yukon — Public Libraries Act, RSY 2002, c. 178

== United Kingdom ==
- The Public Libraries Act 1850 (13 & 14 Vict. c. 65)
- The Public Libraries Act 1853 (16 & 17 Vict. c. 101)
- The Public Libraries (Scotland) Act 1854 (17 & 18 Vict. c. 64)
- The Public Libraries Act 1855 (18 & 19 Vict. c. 70)
- The Public Libraries (Ireland) Act 1855 (18 & 19 Vict. c. 40)
- The Public Libraries Amendment Act 1866 (29 & 30 Vict. c. 114)
- The Public Libraries (Scotland) Act 1867 (30 & 31 Vict. c. 37)
- The Public Libraries Amendment Act 1877 (40 & 41 Vict. c. 54)
- The Public Libraries (Ireland) Amendment Act 1877 (40 & 41 Vict. c. 15)
- The Public Libraries Act 1884 (47 & 48 Vict. c. 37)
- The Public Libraries Consolidation (Scotland) Act 1887 (50 & 51 Vict. c. 42)
- The Public Libraries Act 1892 (55 & 56 Vict. c. 53)
- The Public Libraries (Amendment) Act 1893 (56 & 57 Vict. c. 11)
- The Public Libraries (Scotland) Act 1894 (57 & 58 Vict. c. 20)
- The Public Libraries (Ireland) Act 1894 (57 & 58 Vict. c. 38)
- The Public Libraries (Ireland) Act 1902 (2 Edw. 7. c. 20)
- The Public Libraries (Scotland) Act 1920 (10 & 11 Geo. 5. c. 45)
- The Public Libraries and Museums Act 1964 (c. 75)

=== Collective titles ===
- The Public Libraries Acts 1892 and 1893 was the collective title of the Public Libraries Act 1892 (55 & 56 Vict. c. 53) and the Public Libraries (Amendment) Act 1893 (56 & 57 Vict. c. 11).
- The Public Libraries (Scotland) Acts 1887 and 1894 was the collective title of the Public Libraries Consolidation (Scotland) Act 1887 (50 & 51 Vict. c. 42) and the Public Libraries (Scotland) Act 1894 (57 & 58 Vict. c. 20).
- The Public Libraries (Ireland) Acts 1855 to 1894 was the collective title of the acts of those years, relating to Ireland.

== See also ==
- Museums Act 1845
- List of short titles
