= Truck Acts =

Legislation that outlaws systems that lead to debt bondage

Truck Acts is the name given to legislation that outlaws truck systems, which are also known as "company store" systems, commonly leading to debt bondage. In England and Wales such laws date back to the 15th century.

== History ==
The modern successor of the Truck Acts is found in the Employment Rights Act 1996 sections 13–27. This replaced and updated the Wages Act 1986 which had itself repealed the Truck Acts. A case called Bristow v City Petroleum was the last case to be decided under the old legislation and in it, Lord Ackner in the House of Lords gave a short history of the previous regime.

The old Truck enactments were very numerous and date from about the year 1464. The particular evil intended to be remedied was the truck system, or payment by masters of their men's wages wholly or in part with goods – a system open to various abuse – when workmen were forced to take goods at their master's valuation. The statutes were applied first to one branch of manufacture, and then in succession to others, as experience and the progress of manufactures dictated, until they embraced the whole or nearly the whole of the manufactures of England. They established the obligation, and produced, or at least fortified the custom, of uniformly paying the whole wages of artificers in the current coin of the realm.

== British legislation ==
Woollen Manufactures Act 1725
- Act of Parliament
- Parliament of Great Britain
- Long title: An Act to prevent unlawful Combinations of Workmen employed in the Woollen Manufactures, and for better Payment of their Wages.
- Citation: 12 Geo. 1. c. 34
- Territorial extent: Great Britain

Dates
- Royal assent: 24 May 1726
- Commencement: 24 June 1726 (Note: Section 1.)
- Repealed: 26 July 1889
Other legislation
Amended by	Woollen Manufacture Act 1756; Woollen Manufactures Act 1757; Payment of Colliers' Wages Act 1817; Truck Acts Repeal Act 1831; Truck Amendment Act 1887
Repealed by	Master and Servant Act 1889
Relates to	Frauds of Workmen Act 1739

Status: Repealed

Text of statute as originally enacted

Truck Act 1831 (Note: The citation of this act by this short title was authorised by section 1 of, and the first schedule to, the Short Titles Act 1896. Due to the repeal of those provisions it is now authorised by section 19(2) of the Interpretation Act 1978.)
- Act of Parliament
- Parliament of the United Kingdom
- Long title: An Act to prohibit the Payment, in certain Trades, of Wages in Goods, or otherwise than in the current Coin of the Realm.
- Citation: 1 & 2 Will. 4. c. 37
- Territorial extent: Great Britain (Note: Section 27.); Ireland (Note: Section 18 of the Truck Amendment Act 1887 (50 & 51 Vict. c. 46))

Dates
- Royal assent: 15 October 1831
- Commencement: 15 October 1831 (Note: Section 26.)
- Repealed: 1 January 1987 (Note: The Wages Act 1986 (Commencement) Order 1986.)
Other legislation
Amended by	Summary Jurisdiction Act 1884; Truck Amendment Act 1887; Statute Law Revision Act 1890; Truck Act 1896; National Assistance Act 1948; Statute Law (Repeals) Act 1976
Repealed by	Wages Act 1986
Relates to	Truck Acts Repeal Act 1831

Status: Repealed

Text of statute as originally enacted

Truck Act 1896 (Note: Section 11.)
- Act of Parliament
- Parliament of the United Kingdom
- Long title: An Act to amend the Truck Acts.
- Citation: 59 & 60 Vict. c. 44
- Territorial extent: United Kingdom

Dates
- Royal assent: 14 August 1896
- Commencement: 1 January 1897 (Note: Section 12.)
- Repealed: 1 January 1987 (Note: The Wages Act 1986 (Commencement) Order 1986.)
Other legislation
Amends	Truck Act 1831; Truck Amendment Act 1887
Repealed by	Wages Act 1986

Status: Repealed

Text of statute as originally enacted

In Great Britain and (after 1801) the United Kingdom, a series of acts of Parliament have been enacted to make truck systems unlawful:

- The Woollen Manufactures Act 1725 (12 Geo. 1. c. 34)
- The Truck Act 1831 (1 & 2 Will. 4. c. 37)
- The Truck Amendment Act 1887 (50 & 51 Vict. c. 46)
- The Truck Act 1896 (59 & 60 Vict. c. 44)
- The Truck Act 1940 (3 & 4 Geo. 6. c. 38)

The Truck Acts 1831 to 1896 means the Truck Act 1896 and the Truck Acts 1831 and 1887.

The Truck Acts 1831 to 1940 means the Truck Act 1940 and the Truck Acts 1831 to 1896.

The Truck Acts were repealed by section 32(2) of, and part III of schedule 5 to, the Wages Act 1986.

The rise of manufacturing industry saw many company owners cashing in on their workers by paying them in full or in part with tokens, rather than coin of the realm. These tokens were exchangeable for goods at the company store, often at highly inflated prices. The Truck Act 1831 (1 & 2 Will. 4. c. 37) made this practice illegal in many trades, and the law was extended to cover nearly all manual workers in 1887.

=== Position by 1910 ===
Shop assistants, so far as they are engaged in manual, not merely clerical labour, come under the provisions of the Truck Act 1831 (1 & 2 Will. 4 c. 37) and the Truck Amendment Act 1887 (50 & 51 Vict. c. 46), and in all circumstances they fall within the sections directed against unfair and unreasonable fines in the Truck Act 1896 (59 & 60 Vict. c. 44); but, unlike employees in factories, workshops, laundries and mines, they are left to apply these provisions so far as they can themselves, since neither Home Office inspectors nor officers of the local authority have any specially assigned powers to administer the Truck Acts in shops.

Setting aside the special Hosiery Manufacture (Wages) Act 1874 (37 & 38 Vict. c. 48), aimed at a particular abuse appearing chiefly in the hosiery industry—the practice of making excessive charges on wages for machinery and frame rents—only two acts, the 1887 act and the 1896 act, have been added to the general law against truck since the 1831 act, which repealed all prior Truck Acts and which remained the principal act. The 1887 act amended and extended the act without adding any distinctly new principle; the 1896 act was directed towards providing remedies for matters shown by decisions under the earlier Truck Acts to be outside the scope of the principles and provisions of those acts.

=== Truck Amendment Act 1887 ===
Truck Amendment Act 1887 (Note: Section 1.)
- Act of Parliament
- Parliament of the United Kingdom
- Long title: An Act to amend and extend the Law relating to Truck.
- Citation: 50 & 51 Vict. c. 46
- Territorial extent: Great Britain; Ireland; (Note: Section 18.)

Dates
- Royal assent: 16 September 1887
- Commencement: 16 September 1887 (Note: The Acts of Parliament (Commencement) Act 1793.)
- Repealed: 1 January 1987 (Note: The Wages Act 1986 (Commencement) Order 1986 (SI 1986/1998.)
Other legislation
Amends	Woollen Manufactures Act 1725; Frauds by Workmen Act 1748; Woollen Manufactures Act 1757; Truck Act 1831
Repeals/revokes	Payment of Cutters' Wages Act 1817; Payment of Colliers' Wages Act 1817
Amended by	Truck Act 1896; Statute Law Revision Act 1963; Statute Law (Repeals) Act 1975
Repealed by	Wages Act 1986
Relates to	{{Employers and Workmen Act 1875}}

Status: Repealed

Text of statute as originally enacted

Under the Truck Amendment Act 1887 (50 & 51 Vict. c. 46) the main objects were:

1. to make the wages of workmen, i.e. the reward of labour, payable only in current coin of the realm, and to prohibit whole or part payment of wages in food or drink or clothes or any other articles;
2. to forbid agreements, express or implied, between employer and workmen as to the manner or place in which, or articles on which, a workman shall expend his wages, or for the deduction from wages of the price of articles (other than materials to be used in the labour of the workmen) supplied by the employer. The act added a further prohibition by making it illegal for an employer to charge interest on any advance of wages, "whenever by agreement, custom, or otherwise a workman is entitled to receive in anticipation of the regular period of the payment of his wages an advance as part or on account thereof." Further, it strengthened the section of the principal act which provided that no employer shall have any action against his workman for goods supplied at any shop belonging to the employer, or in which the employer is interested, by
  1. securing any workman suing an employer for wages against any counter-claim in respect of goods supplied to the workman by any person under any order or direction of the employer, and
  2. by expressly prohibiting an employer from dismissing any worker on account of any particular time, place or manner of expending his wages.

Certain exemptions to the prohibition of payment otherwise than in coin were provided for in the Truck Act 1831, if an agreement were made in writing and signed by the worker, viz. rent, victuals dressed and consumed under the employer's roof, medicine, fuel, provender for beasts of burden used in the trade, materials and tools for use by miners, advances for friendly societies or savings banks; in the case of fuel, provender and tools there was also a proviso that the charge should not exceed the real and true value. The act amended these provisions by requiring a correct annual audit in the case of deductions for medicine or tools, by permitting part payment of servants in husbandry in food, drink (not intoxicants) or other allowances, and by prohibiting any deductions for sharpening or repairing workmen's tools except by agreement not forming part of the condition of hiring.

Two important administrative amendments were made by the act:

1. a section similar to that in the Factory and Mines Acts was added, empowering the employer to exempt himself from penalty for contravention of the acts on proof that any other person was the actual offender and of his own due diligence in enforcing the execution of the acts;
2. the duty of enforcing the acts in factories, workshops, and mines was imposed upon the inspectors of the Factory and Mines Departments, respectively, of the Home Office, and to their task they were empowered to bring all the authorities and powers which they possessed in virtue of the acts under which they are appointed; these inspectors thus prosecute defaulting employers and recover penalties under the Summary Jurisdiction Acts, but they do not undertake civil proceedings for improper deductions or payments, proceedings for which would lie with workmen under the Employers and Workmen Act 1875 (38 & 39 Vict. c. 90).

The persons to whom the benefits of the 1831 act applied were added to by the 1887 act, which repealed the complicated list of trades acts contained in the principal act and substituted the simpler definition of the Employers and Workmen Act 1875 (38 & 39 Vict. c. 90). Thus the acts of 1831 to 1887, and also the 1896 act, apply to all workers (men, women and children) engaged in manual labour, except domestic servants; they apply not only in mines, factories and workshops, but, to quote the published Home Office Memorandum on the acts, "in all places where workpeople are engaged in manual labour under a contract with an employer, whether or no the employer be an owner or agent or a parent, or be himself a workman; and therefore a workman who employs ... and pays others under him must also observe the Truck Acts." The law thus in certain circumstances covers outworkers for a contractor or sub-contractor. A decision of the High Court at Dublin in 1900 (Squire v. Sweeney) strengthened the inspectors in investigation of offences committed amongst outworkers by supporting the contention that inquiry and exercise of all the powers of an. inspector could legally take place in parts of an employer's premises other than those in which the work is given out. It defined for Ireland, in a narrower sense than had hitherto been understood and acted upon by the Factory Department, the classes of outworkers protected, by deciding that only such as were under a contract personally to execute the work were covered.

In 1905 the law in England was similarly declared in the decided case of Squire v. The Midland Lace Co. The judges (Lord Alverstone, C. J.; and Kennedy and Ridley, J.J.) stated that they came to the conclusion with "reluctance", and said: "We venture to express the hope that some amendment of the law may be made so as to extend the protection of the Truck Act to a class of workpeople indistinguishable from those already within its provisions." The workers in question were lace-clippers taking out work to do in their homes, and in the words of the High Court decision "though they do sometimes employ assistants are evidently, as a class, wage-earning manual labourers and not contractors in the ordinary and popular sense."

The principle relied on in the decision was that in the case of Ingram v. Barnes. At the time of the passing of the 1887 act it seems to have been generally believed that the obligation under the principal act to pay the "entire amount of wages earned" in coin rendered illegal any deductions from wages in respect of fines.

Important decisions in 1888 and 1889 showed this belief to have been ill-founded. The essential point lies in the definition of the word "wages" as the "recompense, reward or remuneration of labour", which implies not necessarily any gross sum in question between employer and workmen where there is a contract to perform a certain piece of work, but that part of it, the real net wage, which the workman was to get as his recompense for the labour performed. As soon as it became clear that excessive deductions from wages as well as payments by workers for materials used in the work were not illegal, and that deductions or payments by way of compensation to employers or by way of discipline might legally (with the single exception of fines for lateness for women and children, regulated by the Employers and Workmen Act 1875 (38 & 39 Vict. c. 90)) even exceed the degree of loss, hindrance or damage to the employer, it also came clearly into view that further legislation was desirable to extend the principles at the root of the Truck Acts. It was desirable, that is to say, to hinder more fully the unfair dealing that may be encouraged by half-defined customs in work-places, on the part of the employer in making a contract, while at the same time leaving the principle of freedom of contract as far as possible untouched.

The Truck Act 1896 regulates the conditions under which deductions can be made by or payments made to the employer, out of the "sum contracted to be paid to the worker", i.e. out of any gross sum whatever agreed upon between employer and workman. It makes such deductions or payments illegal unless they are in pursuance of a contract; and it provides that deductions (or payments) for (a) fines, (b) bad work and damaged goods, (c) materials, machines, and any other thing provided by the employer in relation to the work shall be reasonable, and that particulars of the same in writing shall be given to the workman. In none of the cases mentioned is the employer to make any profit; neither by fines, for they may only be imposed in respect of acts or omissions which cause, or are likely to cause, loss or damage; nor by sale of materials, for the price may not exceed the cost to the employer; nor by deductions or payments for damage, for these may not exceed the actual or estimated loss to the employer.

Fines and charges for damage must be "fair and reasonable having regard to all the circumstances of the case", and no contract could make legal a fine which a court held to be unfair to the workman in the sense of the act. The contract between the employer and workman must either be in writing signed by the workman, or its terms must be clearly stated in a notice constantly affixed in a place easily accessible to the workman to whom, if a party to the contract, a copy shall be given at the time of making the contract, and who shall be entitled, on request, to obtain from the employer a copy of the notice free of charge. On each occasion when a deduction or payment is made, full particulars in writing must be supplied to the workman. The employer is bound to keep a register of deductions or payments, and to enter therein particulars of any fine made under the contract, specifying the amount and nature of the act or omission in respect of which the fine was imposed. This register must be at all times open to inspectors of mines or factories, who are entitled to make a copy of the contract or any part of it. This act as a whole applies to all workmen included under the earlier Truck Acts; the sections relating to fines apply also to shop assistants. The latter, however, apparently are left to enforce the provisions of the law themselves, as no inspectorate is empowered to intervene on their behalf. In these and other cases a prosecution under the Truck Acts may be instituted by any person.

Any workman or shop assistant may recover any sum deducted by or paid to his employer contrary to the 1896 act, provided that proceedings are commenced within six months, and that where he has acquiesced in the deduction or payment he shall only recover the excess over the amount which the court may find to have been fair and reasonable in all the circumstances of the case. It is expressly declared in the act that nothing in it shall affect the provisions of the Coal Mines Acts with reference to payment by weight, or legalise any deductions, from payments made, in pursuance of those provisions. The powers and duties of inspectors are extended to cover the case of a laundry, and of any place where work is given out by the occupier of a factory or workshop or by a contractor or subcontractor. Power is reserved for the secretary of state to exempt by order specified trades or branches of them in specified areas from the provisions of the Truck Act 1896, if he is satisfied that they are unnecessary for the protection of the workmen. This power has been exercised only in respect of one highly organised industry, the Lancashire cotton industry. The effect of the exemption is not to prevent fines and deductions from being made, but the desire for it demonstrated that there are cases where leaders among workers have felt competent to make their own terms on their own lines without the specific conditions laid down in this act. The reports of the inspectors of factories have demonstrated that in other industries much work has had to be done under this act, and knowledge of a highly technical character to be gradually acquired, before opinions could be formed as to the reasonableness and fairness, or the contrary, of many forms of deduction. Owing partly to difficulties of legal interpretation involving the necessity of taking test cases into court, partly to the margin for differences of opinion as to what constitutes "reasonableness" in a deduction, the average number of convictions obtained on prosecutions is not so high as under the Factory Acts, though the average penalty imposed is higher. In 1904, 61 cases were taken into court resulting in 34 convictions with an average penalty of £1, 10s. In 1905, 38 cases resulting in 34 convictions were taken with an average penalty of £1, 3s. In 1906, 37 cases resulting in 25 convictions were taken with an average penalty of £1, 10s.

Reference should here be made to the Shop Clubs Act 1902 (2 Edw. 7. c. 21) as closely allied with some of the provisions of the Truck Acts by its provision that employers shall not make it a condition of employment that any workman shall become a member of a shop club unless it is registered under the Friendly Societies Act 1896 (59 & 60 Vict. c. 25). As in the case of the Payment of Wages in Public-houses Prohibition Act 1883 (46 & 47 Vict. c. 31), no special inspectorate has the duty of enforcing this act.

== Australian law ==
Under the Fair Work Act 2009 section 323 requires that people are paid in money, rather than in kind.

== See also ==
- Factory Acts
- Workmen's Compensation Act 1897
- Payment of Wages Act 1991
