= Library legislation =

Library legislation is legislation that helps establish and maintain public libraries.

== History ==
Great Britain

Edward Edwards of the British Museum was a firm believer of the establishment of public libraries with public funds through legislation. The thread was picked up by William Ewart and moved proposal in the Parliament of the Great Britain in 1849. On approval of the selection committee, the Bill was introduced in early 1850, which is a red letter day in the annals of the Library movement not only in the Great Britain, but also in the whole world, as it was the first Library Act to be ever enacted.

=== Advantages of Library Legislation ===
A library act provides the following advantages:

- Helps in the establishment of an organized network of public libraries.
- A sound administrative set-up.
- Proper and continuous financial support.
- Coordination in administration and management of public libraries.
- Centralized services like purchase, processing, bibliographical and other services can be provided conveniently.
- Possibility of providing quality library service, at qualified hands, free of charge.

=== Functions ===
The Advisory committee for Libraries constituted by the Government of India (1958) proposed the following five functions of library legislation:

1. It should clearly define the government's responsibility in the matter of public libraries.
2. Legislation should lay down the constitution and functions of the library authority at national, state and district levels.
3. Legislation should provide an assured basis for library finance. There are two ways of providing a firm basis for library finance.
  (i) A special library cess; and
  (ii) Reservation of a certain percentage of the education budget.
4. Legislation should laydown the structure of the public library system.
5. Legislation should provide for participation of the representative of the public, in the work of the public libraries at all levels.
6. Legislation should provide clear guidelines for library cooperation and national catalog.
