= Manchester Free Library =

Public library in Manchester, England

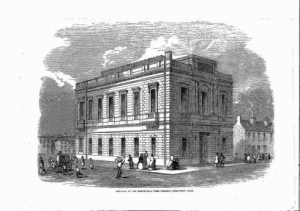
The Manchester Free Library, formerly the Owenite Hall of Science, Campfield

The Manchester Free Library opened on 5 September 1852 in Manchester, England. It was the first public library in England to be set up under the provisions of the Public Libraries Act 1850, (Note: The Royal Museum and Public Library in Salford was the first public library in England, (the first public library in the UK was opened over 200 years earlier in Perthshire, Scotland) opening in 1850, but it was set up under the provisions of the Museum Act, not the Public Libraries Act.) which allowed local authorities to impose a local tax of one penny to pay for the service. The terms of the act required that a poll of ratepayers had to be held before the local authority was allowed to spend money on public libraries, and at least two-thirds had to vote in favour. In Manchester's case only 40 of the more than 4000 eligible voters opposed.

The project was the initiative of John Potter, first Mayor of Manchester, and fellow members of the Portico Library, who started a fund to raise money for the purchase of books and a suitable building to house them. The founding committee included the Bishop of Manchester and the Rev. Thomas Rothwell Bently, the rector of St. Matthew's Church, Campfield. The library was housed in the House of Science in Campfield, close to the present-day site of the Museum of Science and Industry's Air and Space Hall. On its opening it had a stock of 18,028 books, purchased at a cost of £4156 (equivalent to £502,000 in 2025 (Note: UK Consumer Price Index inflation figures from 1209–2024 based on data from "Inflation calculator", Bank of England, London, 18 February 2026)). So busy was it during its first week that a police officer was assigned to control the crowd around the borrowing desk.

Edward Edwards was the first librarian.

The Campfield library was replaced in 1882 by a new building at the corner of Deansgate and Liverpool Road, which is now home to the Spanish Instituto Cervantes.

== See also ==
- List of libraries in the United Kingdom
