= Libraries Offences Act 1898 =

Act of the Parliament of the United Kingdom

Libraries Offences Act 1898 (Note: Section 1.)
- Act of Parliament
- Parliament of the United Kingdom
- Long title: An Act to provide for the Punishment of Offences in Libraries
- Citation: 61 & 62 Vict. c. 52
- Territorial extent: England and Wales (Note: Section 4.)

Dates
- Royal assent: 12 August 1898
- Commencement: 12 August 1898 (Note: The Acts of Parliament (Commencement) Act 1793.)
Other legislation
Amended by	Public Libraries and Museums Act 1964; Friendly Societies Act 1974; Criminal Justice Act 1982; Gambling Act 2005; Co-operative and Community Benefit Societies Act 2014

Status: Amended

Text of statute as originally enacted

Revised text of statute as amended

Text of the Libraries Offences Act 1898 as in force today (including any amendments) within the United Kingdom, from legislation.gov.uk.

The Libraries Offences Act 1898 (61 & 62 Vict. c. 52) is an act of the Parliament of the United Kingdom, applying in England and Wales.

As originally enacted, it provided that certain behaviour in libraries and reading-rooms were considered an offence, liable on summary conviction to a fine of up to forty shillings. The Act extended to any public library established under the Public Libraries Act 1892 (55 & 56 Vict. c. 53), as well as to a library or reading-room maintained by any Industrial or Provident Society, any Friendly Society, or any registered trades union. The Act prohibited, where it was "to the annoyance or disturbance" of any other user - disorderly behaviour, the use of obscene or abusive language, gambling or betting, and persistently remaining within the library beyond its stated closing hours. It applied only to England and Wales.

The act is still in force, though to a limited degree; it no longer extends to public libraries, which are dealt with under the Public Libraries and Museums Act 1964, and as such it only applies to libraries maintained by trade unions, societies regulated by the Co-operative and Community Benefit Societies Act 2014, or friendly societies. The forty-shilling fine has now been replaced by a fine of up to level 1 on the standard scale.

== See also ==
- List of libraries in the United Kingdom
