= Societies' Borrowing Powers Act 1898 =

Act of the Parliament of the United Kingdom

Societies' Borrowing Powers Act 1898 (Note: Section 3.)
- Act of Parliament
- Parliament of the United Kingdom
- Long title: An Act to empower certain Societies to borrow Money from Persons and Corporations other than Members.
- Citation: 61 & 62 Vict. c. 15
- Territorial extent: United Kingdom

Dates
- Royal assent: 25 July 1898
- Commencement: 25 July 1898 (Note: The Acts of Parliament (Commencement) Act 1793.)
- Repealed: 1 April 1975

Other legislation
- Repealed by: Friendly Societies Act 1974

Status: Repealed

Text of statute as originally enacted

The Societies' Borrowing Powers Act 1898 (61 & 62 Vict. c. 15) was an act of the Parliament of the United Kingdom, given royal assent on 25 July 1898 and repealed in 1974.

The act provided that a society was permitted to institute a rule allowing it to take deposits and borrow money (at interest) from its members and from any other persons; as soon as such a rule was registered it was permitted to do so.

The act stipulated that the society had to be registered under the Friendly Societies Act 1896, and have as its object the creation of funds to be lent out for the benefit of the members of the society (or to members of the society), with rules in place to prevent the division of the funds among its members by dividends, profits or the like, and to ensure that all loans were to be applied for purposes of which the society approved.

== Subsequent developments ==
The majority of the act was repealed by section 116(4) of, and schedule 11, to the Friendly Societies Act 1974, which came into force on 1 April 1975.
