= Wages Act 1986 =

Act of the Parliament of the United Kingdom

Wages Act 1986 (Note: Section 33(1).)
- Act of Parliament
- Parliament of the United Kingdom
- Long title: An Act to make fresh provision with respect to the protection of workers in relation to the payment of wages; to make further provision with respect to wages councils; to restrict redundancy rebates to employers with less than ten employees and to abolish certain similar payments; and for connected purposes.
- Citation: 1986 c. 48
- Territorial extent: England and Wales; Scotland; (Note: Section 33(7).)

Dates
- Royal assent: 25 July 1986
- Commencement: 25 July 1986 (various) (Note: Section 33(2).); 1 August 1986 (various) (Note: Section 33(3).); 25 September 1986 (various) (Note: Section 33(4).); 1 January 1987 (rest of act) (Note: Section 33(5). The Wages Act 1986 (Commencement) Order 1986 (SI 1986/1998).)
Other legislation
| Amends | Attachment of Earnings Act 1971; See § Repealed enactments |
| Repeals/revokes | See § Repealed enactments |
| Amended by | Employment Act 1989; Coal Industry Act 1992; Trade Union Reform and Employment Rights Act 1993; Reserve Forces Act 1996; Employment Tribunals Act 1996; Employment Rights Act 1996 |

Status: Partially repealed

Text of statute as originally enacted

Revised text of statute as amended

Text of the Wages Act 1986 as in force today (including any amendments) within the United Kingdom, from legislation.gov.uk.

The Wages Act 1986 (c. 48) is an act of the Parliament of the United Kingdom that made fresh provision with respect to the protection of workers in relation to the payment of wages, further provision with respect to wages councils, and restricted redundancy rebates to employers with fewer than ten employees in Great Britain.

== Provisions ==
=== Repealed enactments ===
Section 11 of the act repealed 15 enactments, listed in schedule 1 to the act.

Enactments repealed by section 11
| Citation | Short title | Extent of repeal |
|---|---|---|
| 1 & 2 Will. 4. c. 37 | Truck Act 1831 | The whole act. |
| 37 & 38 Vict. c. 48 | Hosiery Manufacture (Wages) Act 1874 | The whole act. |
| 46 & 47 Vict. c. 31 | Payment of Wages in Public-houses Prohibition Act 1883 | The whole act. |
| 50 & 51 Vict. c. 43 | Stannaries Act 1887 | Sections 12 and 13. |
| 50 & 51 Vict. c. 46 | Truck Amendment Act 1887 | The whole act. |
| 50 & 51 Vict. c. 58 | Coal Mines Regulation Act 1887 | Sections 12 to 14. |
| 57 & 58 Vict. c. 52 | Coal Mines (Check Weigher) Act 1894 | The whole act. |
| 59 & 60 Vict. c. 44 | Truck Act 1896 | The whole act. |
| 2 Edw. 7. c. 21 | Shop Clubs Act 1902 | The whole act. |
| 5 Edw. 7. c. 9 | Coal Mines (Weighing of Minerals) Act 1905 | The whole act. |
| 9 & 10 Geo. 5. c. 51 | Checkweighing in Various Industries Act 1919 | The whole act. |
| 3 & 4 Geo. 6. c. 38 | Truck Act 1940 | The whole act. |
| 2 & 3 Eliz. 2. c. 70 | Mines and Quarries Act 1954 | Section 51(2). |
| 8 & 9 Eliz. 2. c. 37 | Payment of Wages Act 1960 | The whole act. |
| 9 & 10 Eliz. 2. c. 34 | Factories Act 1961 | Sections 135 and 135A. |

Section 32(2) of the act repealed 31 enactments, listed in parts I, II and III of schedule 5 to the act.

Part I - Repeals coming into force in accordance with s.33(3)
| Citation | Short title | Extent of repeal |
|---|---|---|
| 1975 c. 71 | Employment Protection Act 1975 | Section 104. Section 105(4) and (5). |
| 1978 c. 44 | Employment Protection (Consolidation) Act 1978 | In section 104(2), the words "or paragraph (c)". In section 106(2)(c), the words "or paragraph (c)". Section 113. In Schedule 6, in paragraph 6, the words "or paragraph (c)", and in paragraph 7(a) the words from "or (as " to "that subsection". In Schedule 16, paragraph 23(5). |
| 1982 c. 2 | Social Security (Contributions) Act 1982 | In Schedule 1, paragraph 2(2). |

Part II - Repeals coming into force two months after royal assent
| Citation | Short title | Extent of repeal |
|---|---|---|
| 1970 c. 41 | Equal Pay Act 1970 | Section 4. |
| 1975 c. 71 | Employment Protection Act 1975 | In Part IV of Schedule 16, in paragraph 13(2) and (3) the figure "4", and paragraph 13(6) to (11). |
| 1979 c. 12 | Wages Councils Act 1979 | The whole act. |
| 1982 c. 23 | Oil and Gas (Enterprise) Act 1982 | In Schedule 3, paragraph 41. |

Part III - Repeals coming into force on a day appointed under s.33(5)
| Citation | Short title | Extent of repeal |
|---|---|---|
| 1 & 2 Will. 4. c. 37 | Truck Act 1831 | The whole act. |
| 37 & 38 Vict. c. 48 | Hosiery Manufacture (Wages) Act 1874 | The whole act. |
| 46 & 47 Vict. c. 31 | Payment of Wages in Public-houses Prohibition Act 1883 | The whole act. |
| 50 & 51 Vict. c. 43 | Stannaries Act 1887 | Sections 12 and 13. |
| 50 & 51 Vict. c. 46 | Truck Amendment Act 1887 | The whole act. |
| 50 & 51 Vict. c. 58 | Coal Mines Regulation Act 1887 | The whole act. |
| 57 & 58 Vict. c. 52 | Coal Mines (Check Weigher) Act 1894 | The whole act. |
| 59 & 60 Vict. c. 44 | Truck Act 1896 | The whole act. |
| 2 Edw. 7. c. 21 | Shop Clubs Act 1902 | The whole act. |
| 5 Edw. 7. c. 9 | Coal Mines (Weighing of Minerals) Act 1905 | The whole act. |
| 8 Edw. 7. c. 57 | Coal Mines Regulation Act 1908 | Section 2(2). |
| 9 & 10 Geo. 5. c. 51 | Checkweighing in Various Industries Act 1919 | The whole act. |
| 3 & 4 Geo. 6. c. 38 | Truck Act 1940 | The whole act. |
| 14 & 15 Geo. 6. c. 39 | Common Informers Act 1951 | In the Schedule, the entry relating to the Hosiery Manufacture (Wages) Act 1874. |
| 2 & 3 Eliz. 2. c. 70 | Mines and Quarries Act 1954 | Section 51(2). Section 185. In section 187(1), the words from "the Coal Mines Regulation" to ", and of". |
| 8 & 9 Eliz. 2. c. 37 | Payment of Wages Act 1960 | The whole act. |
| 9 & 10 Eliz. 2. c. 34 | Factories Act 1961 | Sections 135 and 135A. |
| 1969 c. 48 | Post Office Act 1969 | In Schedule 4, paragraph 67. |
| 1973 c. 38 | Social Security Act 1973 | Section 70. |
| 1975 c. 20 | District Courts (Scotland) Act 1975 | In Schedule 1, paragraph 6. |
| 1975 c. 21 | Criminal Procedure (Scotland) Act 1975 | In Schedule 7A, paragraph 2. |
| 1977 c. 45 | Criminal Law Act 1977 | In Schedule 1, paragraph 2. |
| 1980 c. 43 | Magistrates' Courts Act 1980 | In Schedule 1, paragraph 17. |
| 1982 c. 24 | Social Security and Housing Benefits Act 1982 | Section 23A(2). |

== Subsequent developments ==
Sections 1–11 and 28–33, and schedule 1, paragraph 4 of schedule 4, schedule 5 and paragraph 10 of schedule 6, to, the act were repealed by section 242(1) of, and part I of schedule 3 to, the Employment Rights Act 1996, which came into force on 22 August 1996.
