= Truck Act 1940 =

Act of the Parliament of the United Kingdom

Truck Act 1940 (Note: Section 3(1).)
- Act of Parliament
- Parliament of the United Kingdom
- Long title: An Act to restrain legal proceedings under the Truck Acts 1831 to 1896 in respect of certain transactions heretofore effected which might lawfully have been effected in another form, and to remove doubts as to whether persons employed under contracts rendered illegal by those Acts are or were to be regarded for purposes other than those of the said Acts as employed under contracts of service.
- Citation: 3 & 4 Geo. 6. c. 38
- Territorial extent: England and Wales; Scotland; Northern Ireland (in part); (Note: Section 3(2).)

Dates
- Royal assent: 10 July 1940
- Commencement: 10 July 1940 (Note: The Acts of Parliament (Commencement) Act 1793.)
- Repealed: 1 January 1987 (Note: The Wages Act 1986 (Commencement) Order 1986 (SI 1986/1998).)
Other legislation
Amended by	Statute Law (Repeals) Act 1973
Repealed by	Wages Act 1986
Relates to	Truck Act 1831; Government of Ireland Act 1920

Status: Repealed

Text of statute as originally enacted

The Truck Act 1940 (3 & 4 Geo. 6. c. 38) was an act of the Parliament of the United Kingdom. It was one of the Truck Acts 1831 to 1940. It was passed in response to the decision in Pratt v Cook, Son & Co (St. Paul's) in which the court interpreted the Truck Acts in a novel way.

== Subsequent developments ==
Sections 1(1), 1(3) and 2, and in section 3(2), the words from " Save " to " section ", were repealed by section 1(1) of, and part XIII of schedule 1 to, the Statute Law (Repeals) Act 1973, which came into force on 18 July 1973.

Sections 1(1) and (3) and section 3(2) in part were repealed by schedule 1 to the Statute Law (Repeals) Act 1973.

The whole act was repealed by section 11 of, and schedule 1 to, and section 32(2) of, and part III of schedule 5 to, the Wages Act 1986, which came into force on 1 January 1987.

== See also ==
- History of labour law in the United Kingdom

== Bibliography ==
- Halsbury's Statutes
- B A Hepple, Paul O'Higgins and Lord Wedderburn of Charlton. Sweet & Maxwell's Labour Relations Statutes and Materials. Second Edition. Sweet & Maxwell. London. 1983. ISBN 0 421 32010 9. pp 32 & 33.
