= Instituto Cervantes, Manchester =

Listed building in Manchester, England

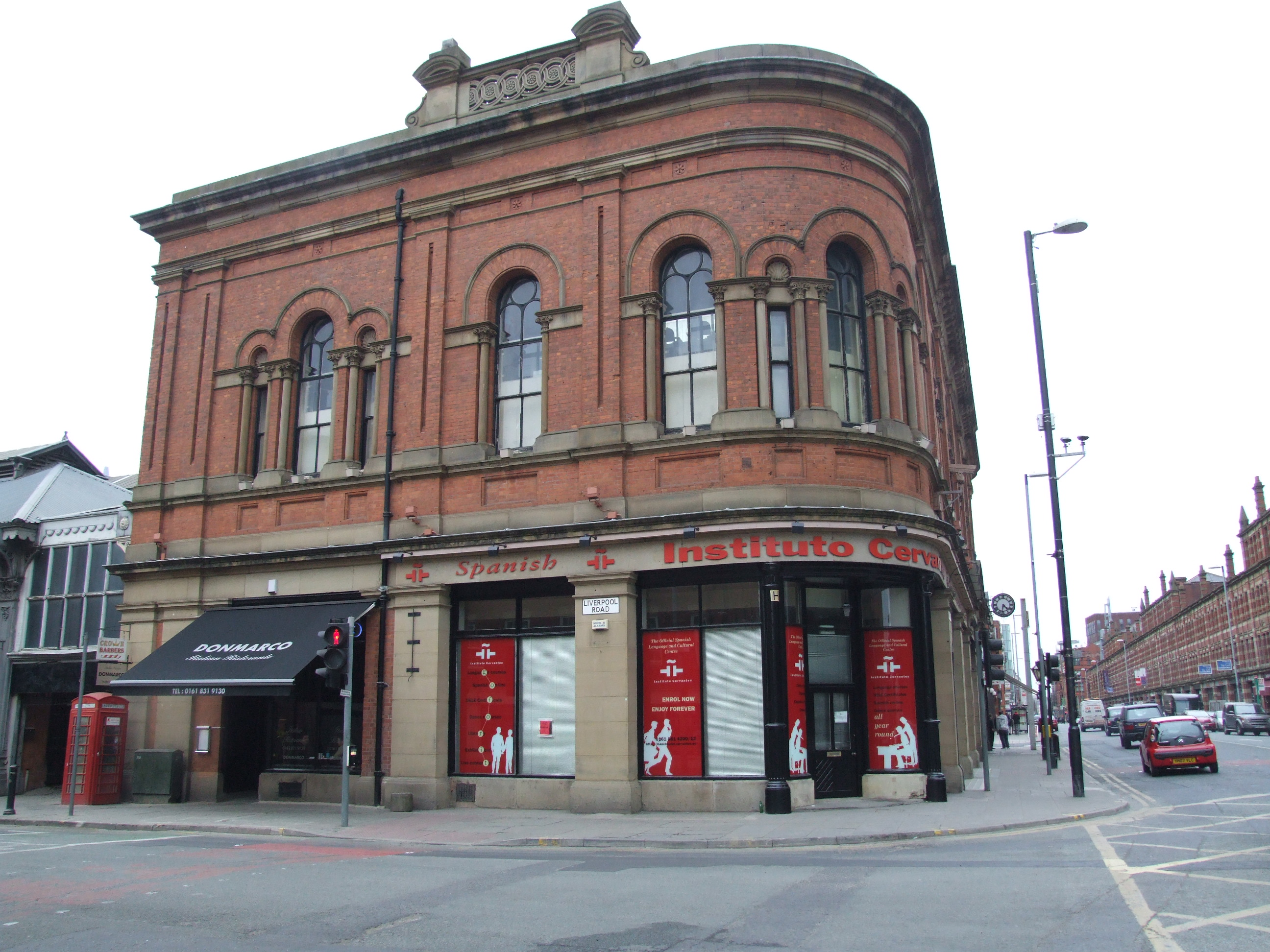
- Manchester, England centre for the Instituto Cervantes

General information
- Type: Former library
- Architectural style: Romanesque Revival
- Location: Deansgate, Manchester, England
- Coordinates: 53.4759°N 2.2513°W
- Year(s) built: 1882
- Owner: Instituto Cervantes

Design and construction
- Architect(s): George Meek
- Designations

Listed Building – Grade II
- Official name: Castlefield Information Centre
- Designated: 17 May 1974
- Reference no.: 1200853

The Instituto Cervantes building stands at the end of Deansgate, in Manchester, England. It is a Grade II listed building in the Romanesque Revival style. Its architect was George Meek, who designed the building c.1882. Originally built as the Deansgate Free Library, it subsequently served as the Castlefield Information Centre, before becoming the Manchester base for the Spanish language and cultural organisation, Instituto Cervantes.

== History and description ==
Deansgate is one of the city of Manchester's oldest roads, being one of the chief thoroughfares of the Roman city of Mamucium. It now features some of the city's most notable buildings, from Manchester Cathedral at its northern end, to the Rylands Library, and the Beetham Tower at its southern termination in the Castlefield district. The Instituto Cervantes building forms part of the street's late 19th century development and was designed by George Meek in 1882.

George Meek (1849–1924) was born in Hull. Joining the surveyors department of the Manchester Corporation as an draughtsman in 1872, he rose to become Chief Architectural assistant, in effect the city architect. In a thirty-year career, he designed a large number of Manchester's buildings before disagreements with the corporation led to his dismissal in 1902. (Note: Following his dismissal, Meek entered private practice, until his retirement to London where he died in 1924.)

Among his many civic commissions was a replacement for the Manchester Free Library which had been established in Castlefield in 1852. (Note: Among the attendees at the opening ceremony was Charles Dickens. Invited to deliver an address Dickens replied, "My engagements are very numerous but the occasion is too important and the example too noble to admit of hesitation.") The first public lending library in England, following the Public Libraries Act 1850, the library was immensely popular. By the 1880s, the original building's size was insufficient and the corporation determined on a new building at the end of Deansgate.

Meek designed the replacement in a Romanesque Revival style. Built of red brick with sandstone dressings, it rises two storeys on a corner site. The institute is a Grade II listed building.

Following the closure of the library, the building operated as the Castlefield Information Centre. It is now the Manchester offices of the Instituto Cervantes. The institute, established by the Spanish government in 1991, promotes the "study, use and teaching of the Spanish language". The Manchester branch opened in 1994. Its first director, from 1995 to 1998, was Antonio Gil de Carrasco. The official opening took place on 19 June 1997 featuring speeches by Raymond Carr, Tom Burns-Marañón and Mario Vargas Llosa.

== See also ==
- Listed buildings in Manchester-M1
