= Public Libraries Act 1855 =

Act of the Parliament of the United Kingdom

Public Libraries Act 1855 (Note: Section 2.)
- Act of Parliament
- Parliament of the United Kingdom
- Long title: An Act for further promoting the Establishment of Free Public Libraries in Municipal Towns, and for extending it to Towns governed under Local Improvement Acts, and to Parishes.
- Citation: 18 & 19 Vict. c. 70
- Territorial extent: England and Wales (Note: Section 26.)

Dates
- Royal assent: 30 July 1855
- Commencement: 30 July 1855 (Note: The Acts of Parliament (Commencement) Act 1793.)
- Repealed: 1 October 1892
Other legislation
Repeals/revokes	Public Libraries Act 1850
Amended by	Public Libraries Amendment Act (England and Scotland) 1866; Public Libraries Act 1855 Amendment Act 1871; Public Libraries Act 1884; Public Libraries Acts Amendment Act 1887; Public Libraries Acts Amendment Act 1889; Public Libraries Acts Amendment Act 1890
Repealed by	Public Libraries Act 1892
Relates to	Towns Improvement Clauses Act 1847

Status: Repealed

Text of statute as originally enacted

The Public Libraries Act 1855 (18 & 19 Vict. c. 70) was an act of the Parliament of the United Kingdom that repealed the Public Libraries Act 1850 (13 & 14 Vict. c. 65) for England and Wales.

The provisions were:

- to extend the right to adopt public library legislation beyond municipal boroughs to parish vestries
- to reduce the population requirement from 10,000 to 5,000
- to allow parishes to group together to meet the population requirement
- to explicitly include the Metropolis
- to allow adoption if a two thirds majority were in favour at a public meeting

== Subsequent developments ==
The whole act was repealed by section 28(1) of, and the second schedule to, the Public Libraries Act 1892 (55 & 56 Vict. c. 53), which came into force on 1 October 1892.

== See also ==
- List of libraries in the United Kingdom
