= Church of St John the Baptist, Niton =

Church on the Isle of Wight, England

Coordinates: 50°35′18″N 01°17′15″W

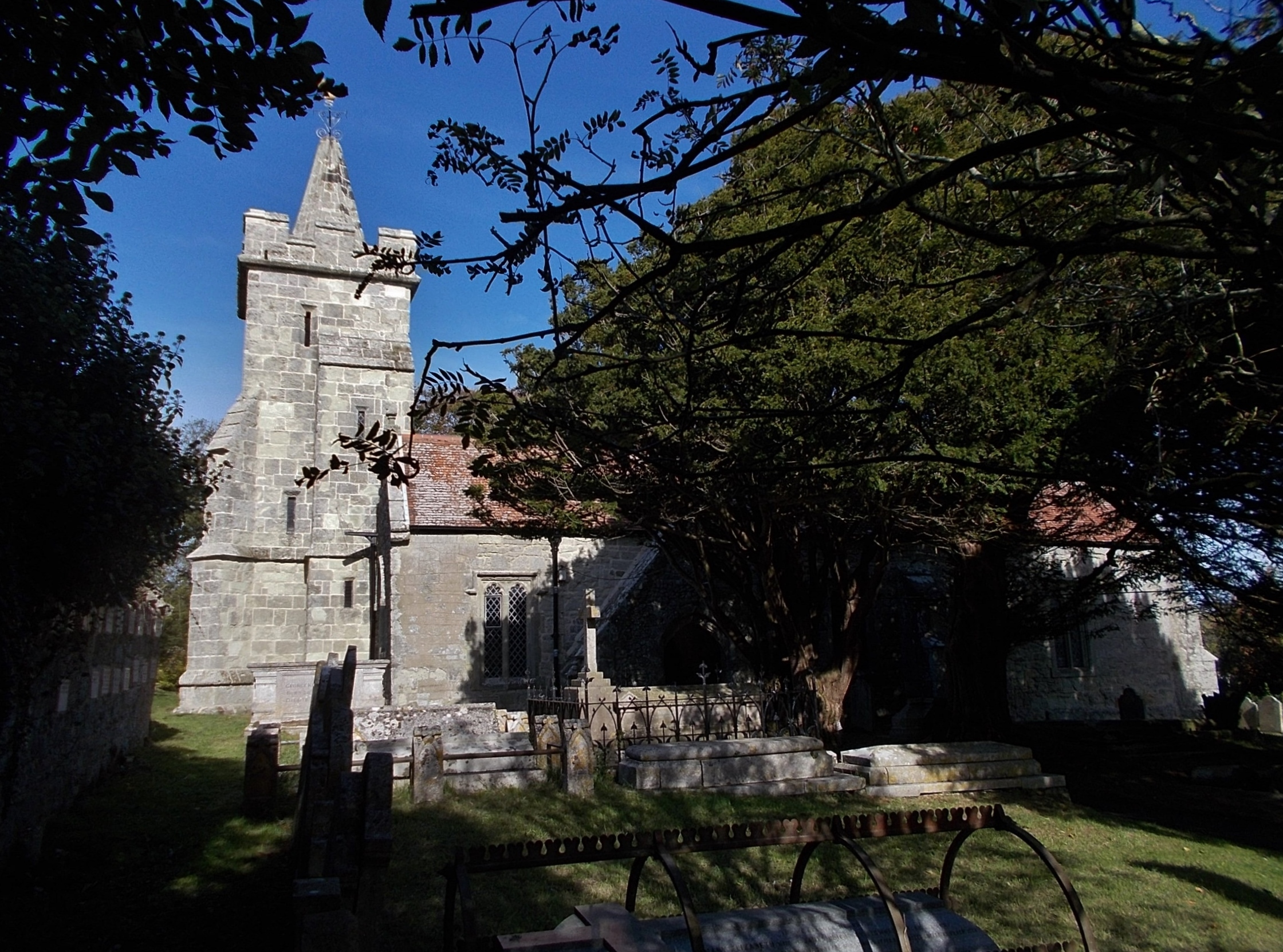
- Church of St John the Baptist, Niton
- Denomination: Church of England
- Churchmanship: Broad Church

History
- Dedication: St John the Baptist

Administration
- Province: Canterbury
- Diocese: Portsmouth
- Parish: Niton, Isle of Wight

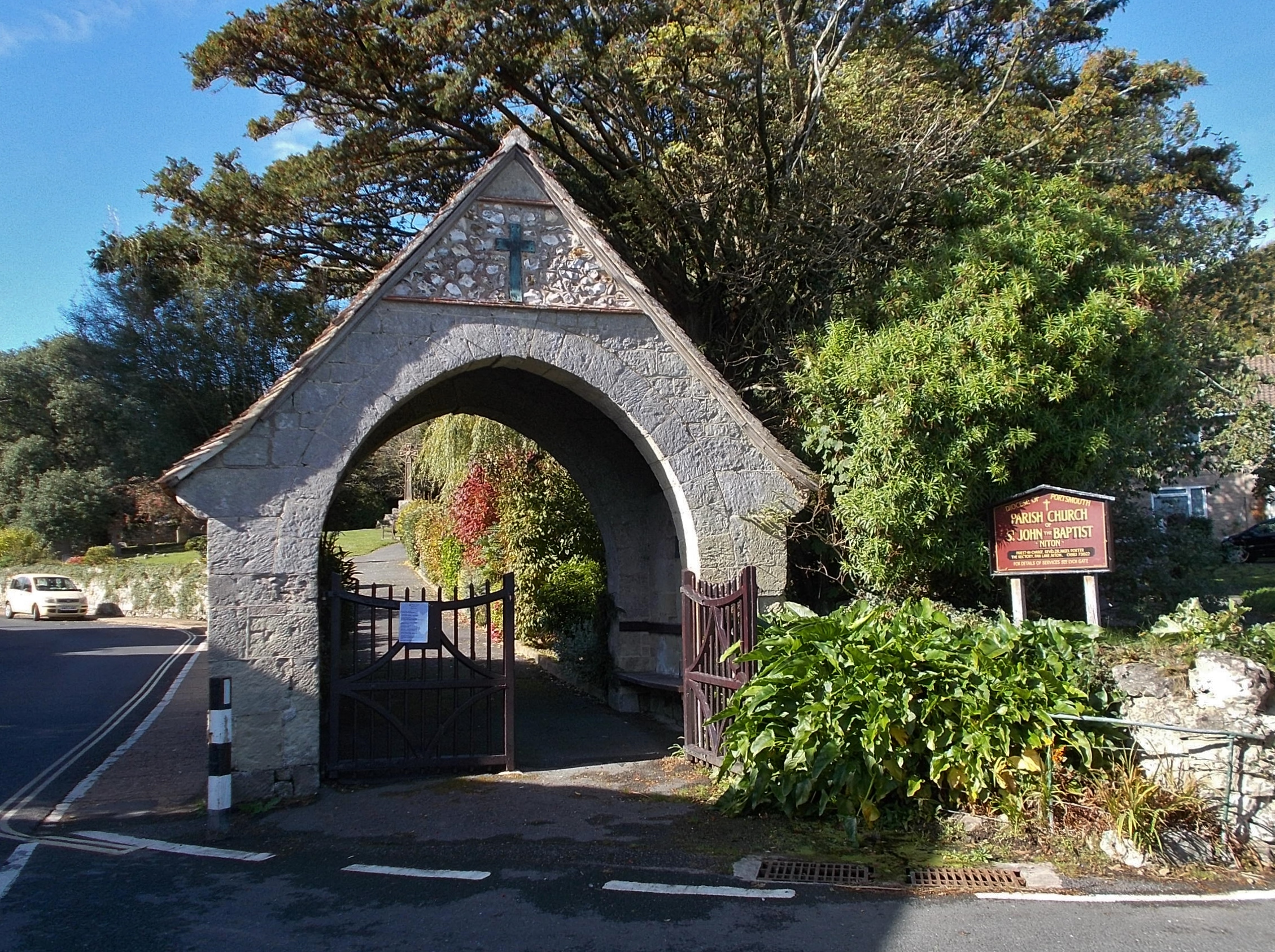
Entrance to the church

The Church of St John the Baptist, Niton is a Church of England parish church in Niton, Isle of Wight.

== History ==
The church was founded by William FitzOsbern and given to an abbey in Normandy. In the Victorian era it was extensively restored and rebuilt.

The nave may be 11th century, as may be the Norman font. A north aisle was added at the end of the 12th century and a south aisle shortly afterwards. In the 14th century the chancel was rebuilt and the south porch was added. In the 15th century a chapel was added south of the chancel and east of the south aisle, and a four-centred arch was inserted in the south wall of the chancel to link it with the chapel. The north aisle was demolished, its arcade filled in and two-light Perpendicular Gothic windows inserted in each of the filled-in arches. The Perpendicular Gothic west tower was added towards the end of the 15th century. The square-headed windows in the south aisle were inserted in the 16th century and the spire was added to the tower probably early in the 17th century.

On the wall can be found a memorial portrait by John Flaxman, showing a woman holding pelicans in her hand in relief. The chancel has a modern reredos.

The registers, which date from 1560, include the following entry:

July the 1st, Anno Domini 1675. Charles II, king of Great Britain, France, and Ireland, etc., came safely ashore at Puckaster, after he had endured a great and dangerous storm at sea.."

In front of the porch is a 19th-century Celtic cross by Joseph Clarke on the four steps of the old churchyard cross.

Near the Celtic cross a marble monument marks the grave of Edward Edwards, (1812–1886) the pioneer of the public library movement. The churchyard also contains four Commonwealth war graves of service personnel, three from World War I and one from World War II.

== Organ ==
A specification of the organ can be found on the National Pipe Organ Register.

== Sources ==
- Page, W.H., ed. (1912). A History of the County of Hampshire, Volume 5. Victoria County History. pp. 187–189.
- Pevsner, Nikolaus; Lloyd, David (1967). Hampshire and the Isle of Wight. The Buildings of England. Harmondsworth: Penguin Books. p. 754.
