= Public Libraries (Ireland) Act 1902 =

Act of the Parliament of the United Kingdom

Public Libraries (Ireland) Act 1902 (Note: Section 1.)
- Act of Parliament
- Parliament of the United Kingdom
- Long title: An Act to amend the Public Libraries (Ireland) Acts.
- Citation: 2 Edw. 7. c. 20
- Territorial extent: Ireland

Dates
- Royal assent: 8 August 1902
- Commencement: 8 August 1902 (Note: The Acts of Parliament (Commencement) Act 1793.)
- Repealed
Other legislation
Amends	Public Libraries Act (Ireland) 1855; Public Libraries Act 1901
Repealed by	Museums (Northern Ireland) Order 1981

Status: Repealed

Text of statute as originally enacted

The Public Libraries (Ireland) Act 1902 (2 Edw. 7. c. 20) was an act of the Parliament of the United Kingdom, given royal assent on 8 August 1902, and repealed in 1981.

It amended the Public Libraries Act (Ireland) 1855 (18 & 19 Vict. c. 40) to allow it to be adopted by Irish rural districts as well as urban districts, allowing them to establish public libraries.

== Subsequent developments ==
The whole act was repealed by the Museums (Northern Ireland) Order 1981 (SI 1981/438).

== See also ==
- Public Libraries Act
- List of libraries in the Republic of Ireland
