= Shop Clubs Act 1902 =

Act of the Parliament of the United Kingdom

Shop Clubs Act 1902 (Note: Section 9.)
- Act of Parliament
- Parliament of the United Kingdom
- Long title: An Act to prohibit compulsory Membership of Unregistered Shop Clubs or Thrift Funds, and to regulate such as are duly registered.
- Citation: 2 Edw. 7. c. 21
- Territorial extent: United Kingdom

Dates
- Royal assent: 8 August 1902
- Commencement: 1 January 1903 (Note: Section 8.)
- Repealed: 1 January 1987 (Note: The Wages Act 1986 (Commencement) Order 1986 (SI 1986/1998).)
Other legislation
Amended by	Friendly Societies Act 1971
Repealed by	Wages Act 1986
Relates to	Friendly Societies Act 1896

Status: Repealed

Text of statute as originally enacted

The Shop Clubs Act 1902 (2 Edw. 7. c. 21) was an act of the Parliament of the United Kingdom, given royal assent on 8 August 1902, and repealed in 1986.

It was made illegal for an employer to require a worker to resign his membership in a friendly society as a condition of employment, or to prohibit him from joining a friendly society other than the workplace shop club or thrift fund.

The Act did allow for compulsory membership of a shop club or thrift fund, provided it was registered under the Friendly Societies Act 1896 (59 & 60 Vict. c. 25) and certified under the act. The certification was conditional on the Registrar of Friendly Societies determining that it offered significant benefits to the employee, that it took contributions at the cost of the employer as well as its members, and that it was of a permanent character. The registrar was also to consult with the workforce, and no such society was to be established unless at least three-quarters of the employees desired it. A schedule provided guidelines for the regulations of any certified societies.

No member was to be forced to resign his membership on account of having left employment; he was to be given the option of remaining a member or having an appropriate share of the funds returned to him.

== Subsequent developments ==
The whole act was repealed by section 33(2) of, and part III of schedule 5 to, the Wages Act 1986, which came into force on 1 January 1987.
