= Friendly Societies Act 1971 =

Act of the Parliament of the United Kingdom

Friendly Societies Act 1971 (Note: Section 15(1).)
- Act of Parliament
- Parliament of the United Kingdom
- Long title: An Act to amend the law relating to societies and branches registered under the Friendly Societies Act 1896, to make other amendments to facilitate the consolidation of the Friendly Societies Acts 1896 to 1968, and for purposes connected therewith.
- Citation: 1971 c. 66
- Territorial extent: England and Wales; Scotland; (Note: Section 15(3).)

Dates
- Royal assent: 27 July 1971
- Commencement: 1 December 1971 (s.9) (Note: Section 15(6). The Friendly Societies Act 1971 (Commencement) Order 1971 (SI 1971/1899).); 31 December 1971 (rest of act) (Note: Section 15(6). The Friendly Societies Act 1971 (Commencement) Order 1971 (SI 1971/1899).)
Other legislation
Amended by	Friendly Societies Act 1974; Statute Law (Repeals) Act 1978

Status: Partially repealed

Text of statute as originally enacted

Revised text of statute as amended

Text of the Friendly Societies Act 1971 as in force today (including any amendments) within the United Kingdom, from legislation.gov.uk.

The Friendly Societies Act 1971 (c. 66) is an act of the Parliament of the United Kingdom that amended the law relating to societies and branches registered under the Friendly Societies Act 1896 in England and Wales and Scotland, making further amendments to facilitate the consolidation of the Friendly Societies Acts 1896 to 1968.

== Provisions ==
=== Repealed enactments ===
Section 14(2) of the act repealed 7 enactments, listed in schedule 3 to the act.

Enactments repealed by section 14(2)
Citation	Short title	Extent of repeal
59 & 60 Vict. c. 25	Friendly Societies Act 1896	Section 2(2)(c).
59 & 60 Vict. c. 25	Friendly Societies Act 1896	In section 5 the word "pay" and the words "as the Treasury may allow".
59 & 60 Vict. c. 25	Friendly Societies Act 1896	In section 14, in subsection (1) the words from "but the rules" to the end of the subsection.
59 & 60 Vict. c. 25	Friendly Societies Act 1896	In section 18, in subsection (2) the words from the beginning to "of the society".
59 & 60 Vict. c. 25	Friendly Societies Act 1896	Section 34.
59 & 60 Vict. c. 25	Friendly Societies Act 1896	In section 35(2) the words "cessio bonorum of a debtor in Scotland".
59 & 60 Vict. c. 25	Friendly Societies Act 1896	In section 50 the words from "and whether" to "personal estate", except the word "vest," and the words from "except" to the end of the section.
59 & 60 Vict. c. 25	Friendly Societies Act 1896	In section 69, in subsection (1) the words from "change its name" in the first place where they occur, to the end of the subsection.
59 & 60 Vict. c. 25	Friendly Societies Act 1896	Section 70.
59 & 60 Vict. c. 25	Friendly Societies Act 1896	In section 71, in subsection (1) the words "amalgamate with or" and in subsection (3) the words "or amalgamates with".
59 & 60 Vict. c. 25	Friendly Societies Act 1896	Section 73(7).
59 & 60 Vict. c. 25	Friendly Societies Act 1896	Section 74.
59 & 60 Vict. c. 25	Friendly Societies Act 1896	In section 76(1) the words "but with the consent of the Treasury in every case".
59 & 60 Vict. c. 25	Friendly Societies Act 1896	In section 78(1), in paragraph (b) the words from "as respects" to "branches" in the second place where it occurs, paragraph (c) and in paragraph (d) the words "or assistant registrars".
59 & 60 Vict. c. 25	Friendly Societies Act 1896	In section 102 the words "The expression 'misdemeanour' shall mean crime and offence".
59 & 60 Vict. c. 25	Friendly Societies Act 1896	In Schedule 1, in paragraph 12 the words from "in a friendly society" to the words "by consent" in the second place where they occur.
2 Edw. 7. c. 21	Shop Clubs Act 1902	Section 3.
2 Edw. 7. c. 21	Shop Clubs Act 1902	The Schedule.
5 & 6 Geo. 5. c. 93	War Loan (Supplemental Provisions) Act 1915	In section 9(1) the words "friendly society or".
13 & 14 Geo. 5. c. 8	Industrial Assurance Act 1923	In section 17, in subsection (1) the words "collecting society or", the words "the Friendly Societies Act 1896 or" and the words "society or" in the second and third places where they occur, in subsection (2) the words from "in the case of a society" to "company may", and in subsection (3) the words "society or" in each place where they occur and the words from "or members" to "management".
13 & 14 Geo. 5. c. 8	Industrial Assurance Act 1923	In section 36, paragraph (1) of subsection (1) and in subsection (2) the words "amalgamate with or".
15 & 16 Geo. 5. c. 20	Law of Property Act 1925	In section 115(9) the word "friendly".
8 & 9 Eliz. 2. c. 61	Mental Health (Scotland) Act 1960	In Schedule 4, the entry relating to the Friendly Societies Act 1896.
1968 c. 55	Friendly and Industrial and Provident Societies Act 1968	In section 6(1) the words "Subject to subsection (5) of this section".

== Subsequent developments ==
All provisions of the act except subsections (5) and (6) of section 11 and subsections (4) and (5) of section 15 were repealed by section 116(4) of, and schedule 11 to, the Friendly Societies Act 1974, which came into force on 1 April 1975. (Note: The Friendly Societies Act 1974 (Commencement) Order 1975 (SI 1975/204).)
