= Friendly Societies Act 1974 =

Act of the Parliament of the United Kingdom

Friendly Societies Act 1974 (Note: Section 117(1).)
- Act of Parliament
- Parliament of the United Kingdom
- Long title: An Act to consolidate the Friendly Societies Acts 1896 to 1971 and certain other enactments relating to the societies to which those Acts apply with amendments to give effect to recommendations of the Law Commission and the Scottish Law Commission.
- Citation: 1974 c. 46
- Territorial extent: England and Wales; Scotland; Isle of Man; Channel Islands; (Note: Section 117(3).)

Dates
- Royal assent: 31 July 1974
- Commencement: 1 April 1975 (Note: Section 117(2).)

Other legislation
- Amends: Libraries Offences Act 1898; See § Repealed enactments
- Repeals/revokes: See § Repealed enactments
- Amended by: Armed Forces Act 1981; Criminal Justice Act 1982; Finance Act 1984; Mental Health (Scotland) Act 1984; Bankruptcy (Scotland) Act 1985; Building Societies Act 1986; Income and Corporation Taxes Act 1988; Friendly Societies Act 1992; Trade Union and Labour Relations (Consolidation) Act 1992; Deregulation (Industrial and Provident Societies) Order 1996; Financial Services and Markets Act 2000; Financial Services and Markets Act 2000 (Mutual Societies) Order 2001; Statute Law (Repeals) Act 2004; Charities Act 2011; Financial Services Act 2012 (Mutual Societies) Order 2013; Co-operative and Community Benefit Societies Act 2014

Status: Partially repealed

Text of statute as originally enacted

Revised text of statute as amended

Text of the Friendly Societies Act 1974 as in force today (including any amendments) within the United Kingdom, from legislation.gov.uk.

The Friendly Societies Act 1974 (c. 46) is an act of the Parliament of the United Kingdom that consolidated enactments related to friendly societies in Great Britain, the Isle of Man and the Channel Islands.

== Provisions ==
=== Repealed enactments ===
Section 116(4) of the act repealed 23 enactments, listed in schedule 11 to the act.

Citation	Short title	Extent of repeal
59 & 60 Vict. c. 25	Friendly Societies Act 1896	The whole act except section 22 and except sections 62 and 64 to 67 as they apply to industrial assurance companies. In section 22, subsection (1) and in subsection (3) the words "society or".
61 & 62 Vict. c. 15	Societies' Borrowing Powers Act 1898	The whole act.
8 Edw. 7. c. 32	Friendly Societies Act 1908	The whole act.
5 & 6 Geo. 5. c. 93	War Loan (Supplemental Provisions) Act 1915	In section 8, in subsection (1) the words "of any registered friendly society or any branch thereof, or" and the words "society" and "or branch" in each place where they subsequently occur; in subsections (2) and (3) the words "society" and "or branch".
13 & 14 Geo. 5. c. 8	Industrial Assurance Act 1923	In section 4(2), the words "A collecting society or". In section 36, in subsection (2) the words from "and section seventy-one" to the end of the subsection.
14 & 15 Geo. 5. c. 11	Friendly Societies Act 1924	The whole act.
19 & 20 Geo. 5. c. 28	Industrial Assurance and Friendly Societies Act 1929	In section 1, in subsection (1) the words "registered friendly societies and", the words "member or" and the words "society or", in subsection (2), the words "a collecting society or" and the words "society or", and subsection (3). In section 3, in subsection (1), the words from "and if any" to the end, in subsection (3), the words "a collecting society or" and the words from "and no" to the end, and subsection (4). In section 5, in subsection (1), the words from "and this Act", where last occurring, to the end and in subsection (3) the words "to the Friendly Societies Act 1896 and", the words "collecting societies and" and the words from "and in its" to the end.
3 & 4 Geo. 6. c. 19	Societies (Miscellaneous Provisions) Act 1940	Sections 8 to 10 and 12.
11 & 12 Geo. 6. c. 39	Industrial Assurance and Friendly Societies Act 1948	In section 1, the words "the Friendly Societies Act 1896", the words "the Act of 1896" and paragraph (a). In section 2, in subsection (1), the words "registered friendly societies and", the words "to the member (in the case of such a society) or" and the words "(in the case of such a company)"; and in subsection (2) the words "society or". Section 3. In section 4, the words "1896". In section 6, in subsection (1) the words "A society (whether registered or unregistered)" and in subsection (2), the words "both as it applies to societies and". Section 15. In section 16, subsection (1), in subsection (2), the proviso, in subsection (4) the words "Any society not being a registered society and" and subsection (5). Section 17. Section 18(1). Section 19. In section 25, in subsection (2), the words from "and this Act" to the end, and in subsection (4) the words from "and in its application" to the end. In Schedule 1, in paragraph 1 the words "registered friendly society or" in paragraph 2 the words "society or" in each place where they occur; in paragraph 3 the words "society or" in the first two places where they occur and in the last place where they occur before sub-paragraph (a); paragraph 5; in paragraph 6 the words "society or" in the first place where they occur; paragraphs 7 to 9. In Schedule 2, the entries relating to the Friendly Societies Act 1896. Schedule 4.
4 & 5 Eliz. 2. c. 19	Friendly Societies Act 1955	Sections 1 and 2. In section 3, subsections (1), (4) and (5). Section 4. In section 5, in subsection (1), paragraph (a), and subsection (2). Section 8. In section 9, subsection (3). Section 10. In section 11, subsection (2) and in subsection (3), paragraph (a).
4 & 5 Eliz. 2. c. 54	Finance Act 1956	In section 26(2), the words "registered friendly society or" and the words "society or".
6 & 7 Eliz. 2. c. 27	Industrial Assurance and Friendly Societies Act, 1948 (Amendment) Act 1958	In section 1, in subsection (1), the words "registered friendly society or". In section 3, in subsection (2), the words from "and this Act" to the end and in subsection (3) the words from "and, in its" to the end.
1965 c. 32	Administration of Estates (Small Payments) Act 1965	In Schedule 1, in Part I, the entry relating to the Friendly Societies Act 1896. In Schedule 2, and in Schedule 3, the entry relating to the Friendly Societies Act 1896.
1966 c. 18	Finance Act 1966	Section 29(4) and (9). In Schedule 8, Part II.
1967 c. 80	Criminal Justice Act 1967	In Schedule 3, in Part I, the entry relating to section 89 of the Friendly Societies Act 1896.
1968 c. 14	Public Expenditure and Receipts Act 1968	In Schedule 3, in paragraph 1(b), the words from "The Industrial" to "paragraph 7".
1968 c. 55	Friendly and Industrial and Provident Societies Act 1968	In section 3, in subsection (4) the words from "(a) in" to "other society", subsection (6) and in subsection (9) the words "under the Act of 1896 or", the words "(as the case may be)" and the words "under either of those Acts". In section 4, in subsection (2) the words "(not being a collecting society)"; subsection (3); in subsection (4) the words "or (3)"; in subsection (7)(b), the words from "of section 27" to "may be"; and in subsection (8)(a) the words from "or for" to "section" and the words "or percentage". In section 7(2)(a) the words "under section 30 of the Act of 1896 or". In section 9, subsection (8). In section 11, in subsection (1) the words from "to the registrar" to "1896 or", the words "(as the case may be)", paragraph (a) and the words from "and in section 27(2)(b)" to the end; in subsection (2) the words "either of"; in subsection (3) the words "under section 98(3) of the Act of 1896 or" and the words "(as the case may be)"; subsection (4); in subsection (5), the words "section 39(a) of the Act of 1896 or", the words "(as the case may be) and", paragraph (b) and the words from "or on that" to the end; and subsections (6) to (8). In section 12, in subsection (2)(b) the words "under section 13 of the Act of 1896 or"; and in subsection (3) the words "in section 13 of the Act of 1896 or" the words from "after the end" to "the registrar or" and the words "(as the case may be)". Section 16. In section 17, in subsection (1), the words "in paragraph 2 of Schedule 1 to the Act of 1896 or", the words from "obligations to provide" to "been undertaken or" and the words from "no further obligations" to "may be)", in subsection (2), the words from "by virtue" to "1896 or" and subsection (4). In section 20(1), the words from "and (b)" to the end. In section 21, in subsection (1), in the definition of "annual return" the words from "in relation to", where those words first occur, to "that Act, and", in the definition of "Scottish society", the words from "either" to "1896 or" and the words "(as the case may be)", in the definition of "society" the words from "either" to "1896 or" and in the definition of "year of account" paragraph (a); in subsection (2), paragraph (a) and the words "to an offence falling within section 89 of the Act of 1896 or" and the words "(as the case may require)". In section 23, in subsection (2), the words from "this Act and" in the second place where they occur to the words "1896 to 1968"; and in subsection (4), paragraph (b). In Schedule 1, paragraphs 1 to 8. Schedule 2. In Schedule 3, in paragraph 2, sub-paragraphs (a), (b) and (c), and paragraphs 5 and 6.
1969 c. 19	Decimal Currency Act 1969	In section 7, subsections (1), (3) and (4).
1969 c. 39	Age of Majority (Scotland) Act 1969	In Schedule 1 the entry relating to section 36 of the Friendly Societies Act 1896.
1969 c. 46	Family Law Reform Act 1969	In Schedule 1 the entry relating to section 36 of the Friendly Societies Act 1896.
1970 c. 10	Income and Corporation Taxes Act 1970	In Schedule 15, paragraph 3(2) and (3).
1971 c. 23	Courts Act 1971	In Schedule 9, in Part I, the entry relating to the Friendly Societies Act 1896.
1971 c. 66	Friendly Societies Act 1971	The whole act except subsections (5) and (6) of section 11 and subsections (4) and (5) of section 15.

== Subsequent developments ==
The act has been amended on several occasions. The Friendly Societies Act 1992 (c. 40) made extensive amendments, introducing a new supervisory framework for friendly societies; these came into force on 1 February 1993. The provisions relating to the Registry of Friendly Societies (sections 1 to 6) were subsequently repealed by the Financial Services and Markets Act 2000 (c. 8).
