= Museums Act 1845 =

Act of the Parliament of the United Kingdom

Museums Act 1845 (Note: The citation of this act by this short title is authorised for the Republic of Ireland by section 4 of, and part 4 of schedule 1 to, the Statute Law Revision Act 2007.)
- Act of Parliament
- Parliament of the United Kingdom
- Long title: An Act for encouraging the Establishment of Museums in Large Towns.
- Citation: 8 & 9 Vict. c. 43
- Territorial extent: United Kingdom

Dates
- Royal assent: 21 July 1845
- Commencement: 21 July 1845 (Note: The Acts of Parliament (Commencement) Act 1793.)
- Repealed: 14 August 1850
Other legislation
Amended by	Statute Law Revision Act 1875
Repealed by	Public Libraries Act 1850

Status: Repealed

Text of statute as originally enacted

The Museums Act 1845 (8 & 9 Vict. c. 43), sometimes called the Museums of Art Act 1845 or the Museums of Art in Boroughs Act, was an act of the Parliament of the United Kingdom which gave the town councils of larger municipal boroughs the power to establish museums.

== Background ==
In the 1830s, at the height of the Chartist movement, there was a general tendency towards reformism in the United Kingdom. This prompted much new legislation to be passed, such as the Parliamentary Reform Act 1832 (2 & 3 Will. 4. c. 45), the Factory Act 1833 (3 & 4 Will. 4. c. 103), the first instance of a government grant for education in the same year and the Poor Law Amendment Act 1834 (4 & 5 Will. 4. c. 76) . The capitalist economic model had created shift patterns which left workers with free time, in contrast to the agrarian model, and the middle classes were concerned that the workers' free time was not being well-spent. This was prompted more by Victorian middle-class paternalism rather than by demand from the lower social orders. Campaigners felt that encouraging the lower classes to spend their free time on morally uplifting activities, such as reading, would promote greater social good.

In 1835, and against government opposition, James Silk Buckingham, MP for Sheffield and a supporter of the temperance movement, was able to secure the chair of the select committee which would examine "the extent, causes, and consequences of the prevailing vice of intoxication among the labouring classes of the United Kingdom" and propose solutions. Francis Place, a campaigner for the working class, agreed that "the establishment of parish libraries and district reading rooms, and popular lectures on subjects both entertaining and instructive to the community might draw off a number of those who now frequent public houses for the sole enjoyment they afford." Buckingham introduced to Parliament a public institution Bill allowing boroughs to charge a tax to set up libraries and museums, the first of its kind. Although this did not become law, it had a major influence on William Ewart and Joseph Brotherton, MPs, who introduced a bill which would "[empower] boroughs with a population of 10,000 or more to raise a 1/2d for the establishment of museums." This became the Museums Act 1845.

== Subsequent developments ==
As to bequests under this act, see Harrison v The Corporation of Southampton.

The whole act was repealed by section 1 of the Public Libraries Act 1850 (13 & 14 Vict. c. 65), subject to section 9 of that act, which came into force on 14 August 1850.

The act was retained for the Republic of Ireland by section 2(2)(a) of, and part 4 of schedule 1 to, the Statute Law Revision Act 2007, which came into force on 8 May 2007.
