= Edward Edwards (librarian) =

English librarian and biographer (1812–1886)

Edward Edwards (1812–1886) was a British librarian, library historian, and biographer. He was an important figure in the establishment of free libraries in the United Kingdom. He died and is buried in Niton on the Isle of Wight.

== Early life and work ==
Edwards was born in Stepney (London) on 14 December 1812. His father, Anthony Turner Edwards, was a builder and apprenticed his son to this trade at the age of fourteen. There is no record of Edwards' education and early employments. However, it is known that he attended the King's Weigh House chapel, where he was influenced by Rev. Thomas Binney. Also, Edwards received private lessons from Edwin Abbott and was—as was his teacher—a member of a German reading circle of the Marylebone Literary and Scientific Institution.

In the 1830s, Edwards developed interests in education, library science, and industrial art. The wide range of these pursuits may be traced to the frequency of Edwards's presence at functions of the Society of Wranglers, a radical art and literary discussion club. Among the members of this society were George Godwin, Henry Hayward, and Margaretta Hayward, sister of the latter and future wife of Edwards.

After his father's business went bankrupt in 1832, young Edwards seems to have depended entirely on the financial compensation of his research and writing. In 1836 he published anonymously a pamphlet, in which he argued against various restrictions which at that time made education only accessible to a small elite. Later that year, Edwards published an open letter to Benjamin Hawes, who had sat on the parliamentary select committee on the British Museum. The letter contained numerous suggestions for the improvement of the museum library, including the proposal of longer opening hours to extend the use of the library to a wider class of person. As the letter caused much discussion in the academic world, a second edition of the letter was printed privately in 1839.

Being a co-founder of the Art Union of London, Edwards was soon appointed its honorary secretary. In 1840, however, Edwards had to leave the union in disgrace, having squandered over £300 of its funds.

After some time of research in France, Edwards published a work on engravings by the process of Achille Collas. When Edwards returned to London, he was also asked by James Macarthur to help him with the research for his account of New South Wales. Edward's name did not appear in connection with the work, even though it was presumed that he wrote large parts of it.

On 11 June 1844, Edwards married Margaretta Hayward, who he had met at the Society of Wranglers.

== Association with the British Museum ==
Meanwhile, Edward's open letter about improving the library of the British Museum had attracted the attention of authorities, with the result that when Edwards applied to Antonio Panizzi in 1838, the museum's newly elected keeper of printed books was inclined to hear him out. In 1839, Edwards joined the staff and became a supernumerary assistant in the printed book department, for especial employment on the new catalogue ordered by the trustees. Together with Panizzi, John Winter Jones, Thomas Watts, and John Humffreys Parry, Edwards worked on the ninety-one rules for the formation of this new catalogue. Besides that, Edwards Edwards was assigned to the duty of cataloguing the Thomason collection of tracts and pamphlets printed during the English Civil War, Commonwealth, and Restoration periods.

By the late 1840s, Edwards focused his attention on the statistics of libraries and on comparative librarianship. His results---which were often published in the Athenaeum---were criticised by other librarians as largely unreliable. A Mr. Watts, Edwards's colleague and one of his biggest opponents, wrote a series of corrective letters (also published in the Athenaeum) in rebuttal of Edward's articles, using the signature "Verificator". Nevertheless, Edwards had also gained supporters, the most prominent of which being William Ewart, who had also been involved in the Art Union of London and whose committee on free libraries in 1850 originated the Public Libraries Act.

== Association with the Manchester Free Library ==
The librarianship of the first important free library established under Mr. Ewart's act was offered to Edwards, who was happy to accept as his superiors at the British Museum were frequently dissatisfied by his work ethic. Edwards accordingly became the first librarian of the Manchester Free Library soon after he was dismissed from the museum's library in 1850. During his time at the Manchester Free Library Edwards developed a classified catalogue which was published in 1855 in the form of a letter to Sir John Potter, chairman of the library committee. It was not long, however, until the management became aware of Edwards' frequent absences and his conduct of private research during work time which finally lead to his dismissal in 1858.

== Later life ==
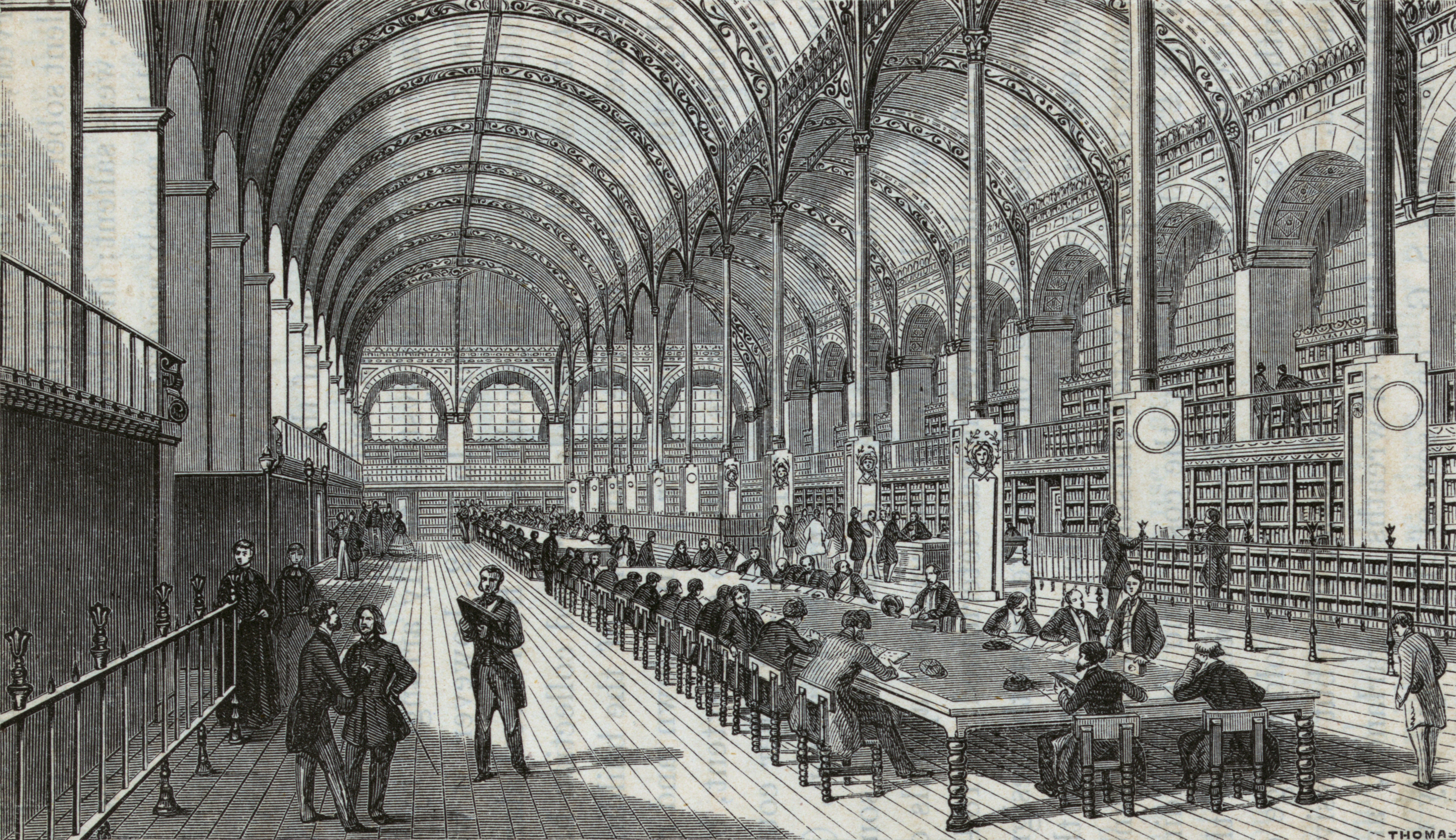
Bibliothèque Sainte-Geneviève from Edwards' Memoirs of Libraries

Having been dismissed by two libraries in less than a decade, Edwards turned towards science, both in the fields of literature and librarianship. Aside from the works listed below, he also wrote several articles for the 8th edition of the Encyclopædia Britannica. Edwards' biography of Sir Walter Raleigh has been praised particularly for the second volume, because it contained for the first time a complete edition of Raleigh's correspondence. The first volume containing the memoir, however, appeared almost simultaneously with that of James Augustus St. John and "it was remarked with surprise that each biography appeared to be deficient in whatever gave interest to the other, and that the two would need to be blended to produce a really satisfactory work".

From 1870 to 1876 Edwards was engaged to catalogue the library of Queen's College, Oxford, which marked a happy period in his life only disturbed by the death his wife in 1876. On the formation of the Library Association in 1877 Edwards was proposed as its first president, but had to refuse due to deafness. Nevertheless, Edwards accepted working at the Bodleian Library from 1877 to 1883, calendaring the Carte papers. The Library Association elected Edwards as an honorary member in 1882; in the same year, he was asked to revise the articles Newspapers and Post Office for the ninth edition of the Encyclopædia Britannica.

After Edwards was dismissed from his engagement at Oxford due to economic shortages, he retired to Niton, Isle of Wight, and occupied himself with projects for a second edition of his Memoirs of Libraries, with great alterations and improvements.

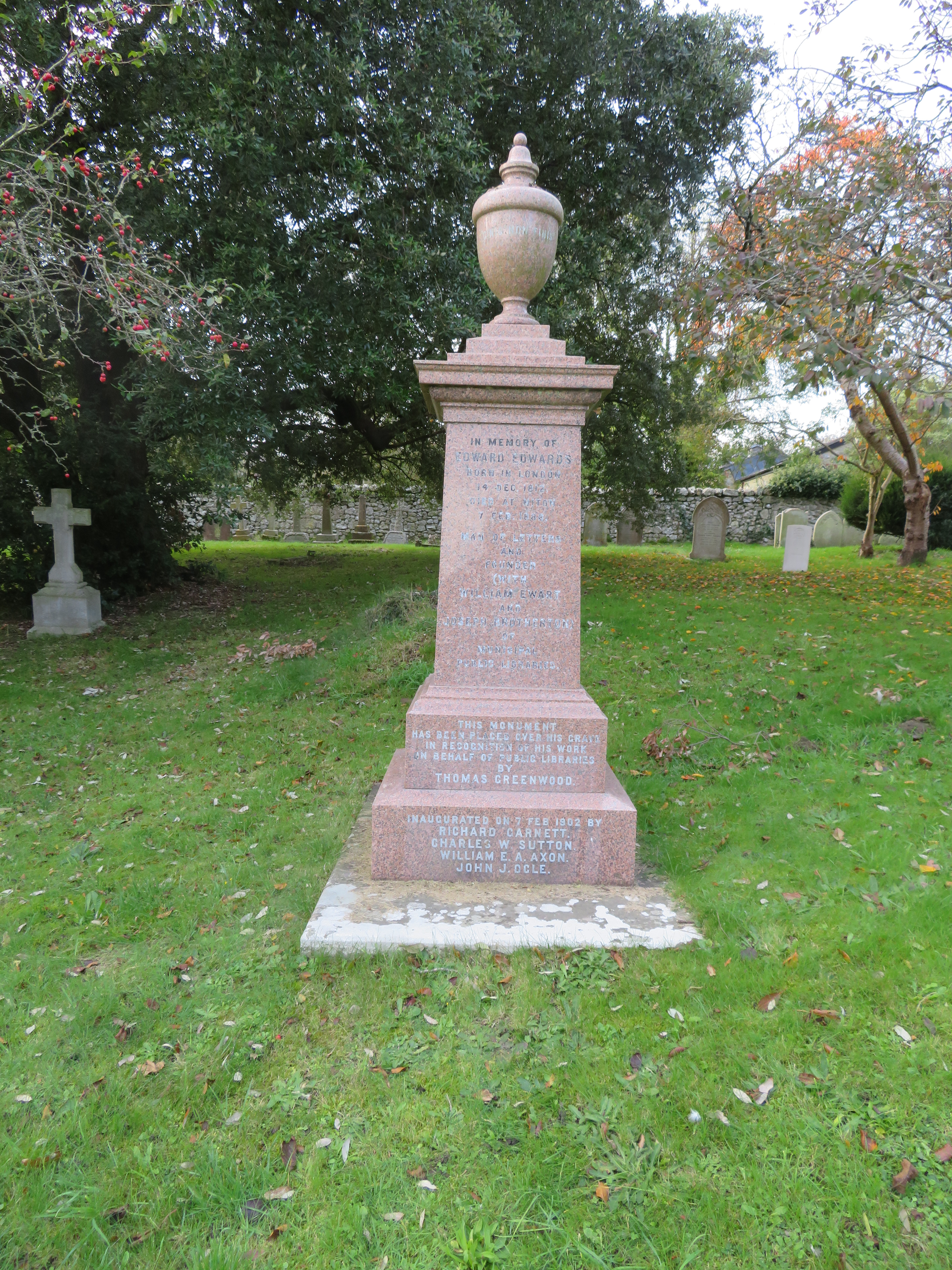
Grave marker to Edward Edwards, St John the Baptist, Churchyard, Niton, Isle of Wight

Edwards spent his final years in poverty and was taken in rent-free by Rev. John Harrison, a Baptist minister, after having been thrown out for non-payment of rent. In November 1885, he got lost on an excursion and was found after several days "in a state of hypothermia sheltering inside a roofless building next to St. Catherine's Oratory and afterwards developed pneumonia". He found dead in his room on 7 February 1886, and was buried in the graveyard of the local Church of England church on 10 February. His grave remained unmarked until 1902 when his biographer Thomas Greenwood paid his debts and erected a monument over his grave.

== Selected works ==
- Edwards, Edward (1836): Metropolitan university. London: Effingham Wilson, Compton and Ritchie.
- Edwards, Edward (1836): A Letter to Benjamin Hawes, Esq. M.P. London: Effingham Wilson.
- Edwards, Edward (1837): The Great Seals of England. London: Henry Hering.
- Edwards, Edward (ed.) / Collas, Achille (1837): The Napoleon Medals. London: Henry Hering.
- Edwards, Edward (1839): Remarks on the Minutes of Evidence Taken before the Select Committee on the British Museum. London: Privately printed.
- Macarthur, James (1837): New South Wales. London: D. Walter.
- Edwards, Edward (1840): The Administrative Economy of the Fine Arts in England. London: Saunders and Otley.
- Edwards, Edward (1859): Memoirs of Libraries. London: Trübner & Co.
- Edwards, Edward (1864): Libraries and founders of libraries. London: Trübner & Co.
- Edwards, Edward (1864): Chapters of the Biographical History of the French Academy. London: Trübner & Co.
- Edwards, Edward (1866): Liber Monasterii de Hyda. London: Longmans, Green, Reader and Dyer.
- Edwards, Edward (1868): The life of Sir Walter Ralegh. [London]: Macmillan.
- Edwards, Edward (1869): Free town libraries. London: Trübner & Co.
- Edwards, Edward (1870): Lives of the Founders of the British Museum. London: Trübner & Co.
- Edwards, Edward (1870): Lives of the Founders of the British Museum. London: Trübner & Co.
- Edwards, Edward / Hole, Charles (1885): A handbook to the literature of collective biography. Brittain: Ventnor.
