= Public Libraries and Museums Act 1964 =

Act of the Parliament of the United Kingdom to provide free public libraries

Public Libraries and Museums Act 1964 (Note: Section 26(1).)
- Act of Parliament
- Parliament of the United Kingdom
- Long title: An Act to place the public library service provided by local authorities in England and Wales under the superintendence of the Secretary of State, to make new provision for regulating and improving that service and as to the provision and maintenance of museums and art galleries by such authorities, and for purposes connected with the matters aforesaid.
- Citation: 1964 c. 75
- Territorial extent: England and Wales (Note: Section 26(8).)

Dates
- Royal assent: 31 July 1964
- Commencement: 1 April 1965 (Note: Section 26(7).)
Other legislation
Amends	Local Government Act 1894; Libraries Offences Act 1898; Rating and Valuation Act 1925; Local Government Act 1933; Acquisition of Land (Authorisation Procedure) Act 1946; Education Act 1946; Charities Act 1960; London Government Act 1963
Repeals/revokes	Museums and Gymnasiums Act 1891; Public Libraries Act 1892; Public Libraries (Amendment) Act 1893; Public Libraries Act 1901; Public Libraries Act 1919
Amended by	Superannuation Act 1972; Local Government Act 1972; Local Government Superannuation Regulations 1974; Statute Law (Repeals) Act 1974; Statute Law (Repeals) Act 1975; Local Government and Housing Act 1989; Transfer of Functions (National Heritage) Order 1992; Local Government (Wales) Act 1994; Copyright and Related Rights Regulations 1996; Local Government Byelaws (Wales) Act 2012; Marriage (Same Sex Couples) Act 2013 (Consequential and Contrary Provisions and Scotland) and Marriage and Civil Partnership (Scotland) Act 2014 (Consequential Provisions) Order 2014; Public Bodies (Abolition of the Library Advisory Council for England) Order 2015

Status: Amended

Text of statute as originally enacted

Revised text of statute as amended

Text of the Public Libraries and Museums Act 1964 as in force today (including any amendments) within the United Kingdom, from legislation.gov.uk.

The Public Libraries and Museums Act 1964 (c. 75) is an act of the Parliament of the United Kingdom. It created a statutory duty for local authorities in England and Wales "to provide a comprehensive and efficient library service for all persons". It also allowed local authorities to "provide and maintain museums and art galleries".

== Background ==
The Act was based on research including the 1962 Bourdillon Report (Standards of Public Library Service in England and Wales) which set out the resources which would be required to provide a comprehensive service.

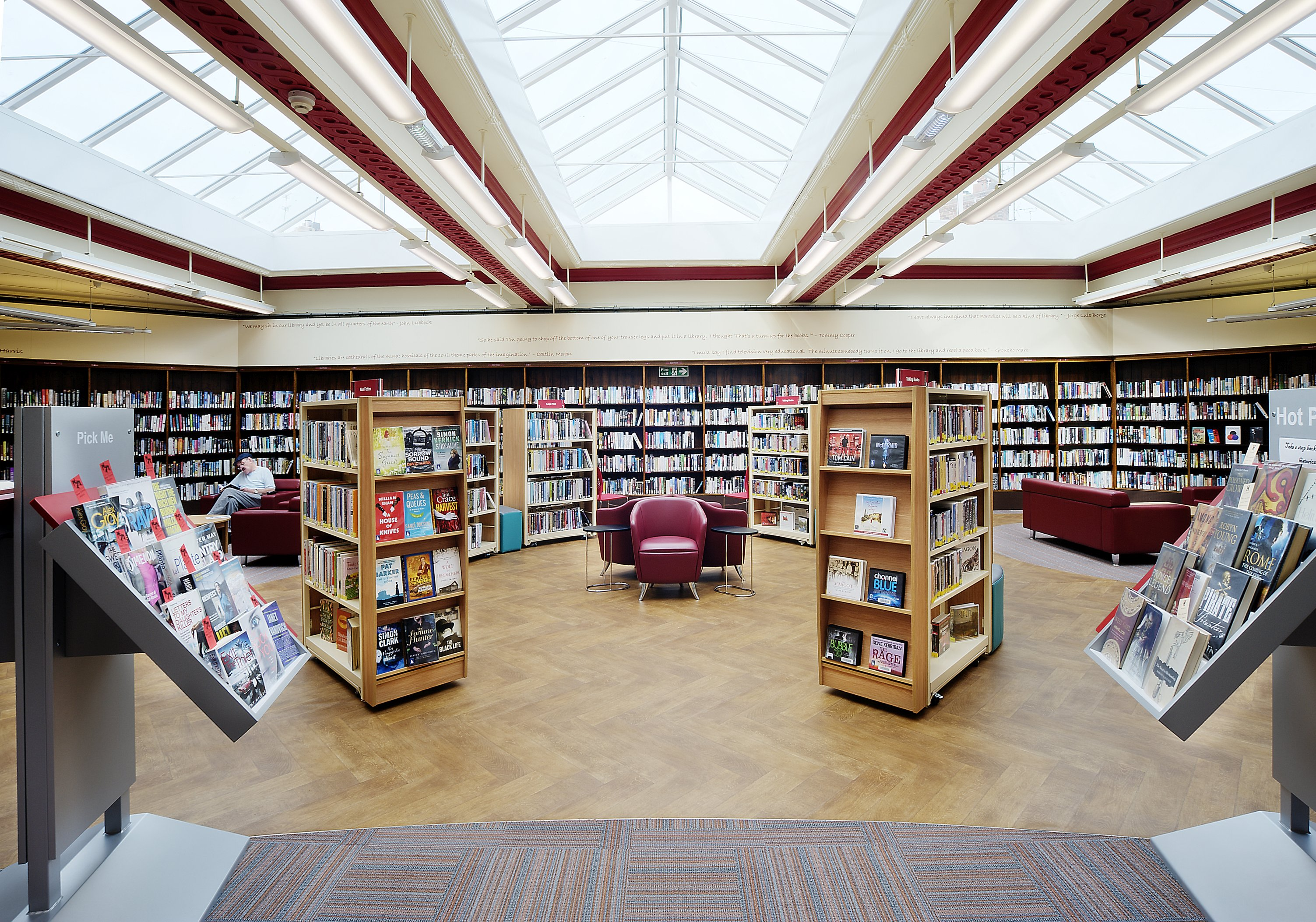
Barrow Library is part of Westmorland and Furness Council's library service to comply with the provisions of the act.

== Subsequent developments ==
Section 26(2) of, and schedule 3 to, the act were repealed by section 1 of, and part XI of the schedule to, the Statute Law (Repeals) Act 1974, which came into force on 27 June 1974.
