= Public Libraries Act 1892 =

Act of the Parliament of the United Kingdom

Public Libraries Act 1892 (Note: Section 31.)
- Act of Parliament
- Parliament of the United Kingdom
- Long title: An Act to consolidate and amend the Law relating to Public Libraries.
- Citation: 55 & 56 Vict. c. 53
- Territorial extent: England and Wales (Note: Section 1.)

Dates
- Royal assent: 27 June 1892
- Commencement: 1 October 1892 (Note: Section 30.)
- Repealed: 1 April 1965
Other legislation
Amends	See § Repealed enactments
Repeals/revokes	See § Repealed enactments
Amended by	Local Government Act 1894; Rating and Valuation Act 1925; Local Government Act 1933; Charities Act 1960; London Government Act 1963
Repealed by	Public Libraries and Museums Act 1964

Status: Repealed

Text of statute as originally enacted

The Public Libraries Act 1892 (55 & 56 Vict. c. 53) was an act of the Parliament of the United Kingdom that consolidated enactments related to public libraries in England and Wales.

== Provisions ==
=== Repealed enactments ===
Section 28(1) of the act repealed 7 enactments, listed in the second schedule to the act.

Citation	Short title	Description	Extent of repeal
18 & 19 Vict. c. 70	Public Libraries Act 1855	The Public Libraries Act, 1855.	The whole act.
29 & 30 Vict. c. 114	Public Libraries Amendment Act (England and Scotland) 1866	The Public Libraries Amendment Act (England and Scotland), 1866.	So far as relating to England and Wales.
34 & 35 Vict. c. 71	Public Libraries Act 1855 Amendment Act 1871	The Public Libraries Act, 1855, Amendment Act, 1871.	The whole act.
47 & 48 Vict. c. 37	Public Libraries Act 1884	The Public Libraries Act, 1884.	So far as relating to England and Wales.
50 & 51 Vict. c. 22	Public Libraries Acts Amendment Act 1887	The Public Libraries Acts Amendment Act, 1887.	The whole act.
52 & 53 Vict. c. 9	Public Libraries Acts Amendment Act 1889	The Public Libraries Acts Amendment Act, 1889.	The whole act.
53 & 54 Vict. c. 68	Public Libraries Acts Amendment Act 1890	The Public Libraries Acts Amendment Act, 1890.	The whole act.

== Subsequent developments ==
The whole act was repealed by section 26(2) of, and schedule 3 to, the Public Libraries and Museums Act 1964 (1964 c. 75), which came into force on 1 April 1965.
