= Friendly Societies Act 1896 =

Act of the Parliament of the United Kingdom

Friendly Societies Act 1896 (Note: Section 109.)
- Act of Parliament
- Parliament of the United Kingdom
- Long title: An Act to consolidate the Law relating to Friendly and other Societies.
- Citation: 59 & 60 Vict. c. 25
- Territorial extent: England and Wales; Scotland; (Note: Section 108.)

Dates
- Royal assent: 7 August 1896
- Commencement: 1 January 1897 (Note: Section 108.)
Other legislation
Amends	See § Repealed enactments
Repeals/revokes	See § Repealed enactments
Amended by	Friendly Societies Act 1908; Statute Law Revision Act 1908; Perjury Act 1911; Friendly Societies Act 1924; False Oaths (Scotland) Act 1933; Industrial Assurance and Friendly Societies Act 1948; Friendly Societies Act 1955; Charities Act 1960; Building Societies Act 1962; Theft Act 1968; Friendly and Industrial and Provident Societies Act 1968; Family Law Reform Act 1969; Statute Law (Repeals) Act 1969; Friendly Societies Act 1971; Friendly Societies Act 1974; Friendly Societies Act 1992
Relates to	Friendly Societies Act 1829; Friendly Societies Act 1850; Friendly Societies Act 1855; Friendly Societies Act 1875; Collecting Societies and Industrial Assurance Companies Act 1896; Shop Clubs Act 1902

Status: Partially repealed

Text of statute as originally enacted

Revised text of statute as amended

Text of the Friendly Societies Act 1896 as in force today (including any amendments) within the United Kingdom, from legislation.gov.uk.

The Friendly Societies Act 1896 (59 & 60 Vict. c. 25) is an act of the Parliament of the United Kingdom that consolidated and amended enactments relating to friendly societies in Great Britain.

As of 2025, the act remains in force for England and Wales and Scotland and is the governing legislation for friendly societies.

== Provisions ==
=== Repealed enactments ===
Section 107 repealed 6 enactments, listed in the third schedule to the act.

Citation	Short title	Title	Extent of repeal
38 & 39 Vict. c. 60.	Friendly Societies Act 1875	Friendly Societies Act, 1875	The whole act, except so far as it relates to societies to which section thirty applies and to industrial assurance companies.
46 & 47 Vict. c. 47	Provident Nominations and Small Intestacies Act 1883	The Provident Nominations and small Intestacies Act, 1883.	So much as relates to registered societies.
50 & 51 Vict. c. 56	Friendly Societies Act 1887	The Friendly Societies Act, 1887.	The whole act, except in section two so much as relates to section thirty of the Friendly Societies Act, 1875, and subsection two of section eight, sub-section four of section nine, and sections twelve and eighteen.
51 & 52 Vict. c. 15.	National Debt (Supplemental) Act 1888	The National Debt (Supplemental) Act, 1888.	Section six.
56 & 57 Vict. c. 30	Friendly Societies Act 1893	The Friendly Societies Act, 1893.	The whole act.
58 & 59 Vict. c. 26	Friendly Societies Act 1895	The Friendly Societies Act, 1895.	The whole act, except sections fifteen and nineteen.

== Subsequent developments ==
The Collecting Societies and Industrial Assurance Companies Act 1896 (59 & 60 Vict. c. 26), passed at the same time as the act, further consolidated enactments relating to friendly societies and industrial assurance companies in the United Kingdom.

Section 48 of the act was repealed by section 1 of, and part III of the schedule to, the Statute Law (Repeals) Act 1969, which came into force on 1 January 1970.

The majority of the act was repealed by section 116(4) of, and schedule 11, to the Friendly Societies Act 1974, which came into force on 1 April 1975.
