= Public Libraries Act 1850 =

Act of the Parliament of the United Kingdom

Public Libraries Act 1850 (Note: Section 10.)
- Act of Parliament
- Parliament of the United Kingdom
- Long title: An Act for enabling Town Councils to establish Public Libraries and Museums.
- Citation: 13 & 14 Vict. c. 65
- Introduced by: William Ewart (Commons)
- Territorial extent: England and Wales (Note: Section 1.); Scotland; Ireland; (Note: The act was extended to Scotland and Ireland by the Public Libraries Act 1853 (16 & 17 Vict. c. 101))

Dates
- Royal assent: 14 August 1850
- Commencement: 14 August 1850 (Note: The Acts of Parliament (Commencement) Act 1793.)
- Repealed: 30 July 1855
Other legislation
Repeals/revokes	Museums Act 1845
Amended by	Public Libraries Act 1853
Repealed by	Public Libraries Act 1855

Status: Repealed

Text of statute as originally enacted

The Public Libraries Act 1850 (13 & 14 Vict. c. 65), sometimes called the Public Libraries and Museums Act 1850, was an act of the Parliament of the United Kingdom which first gave local boroughs the power to establish free public libraries. The act was the first legislative step in the creation of an enduring national institution that provides universal free access to information and literature, and was indicative of the moral, social and educative concerns of the time. The legacy of the act can be followed through subsequent legislation that built on and expanded the powers granted in 1850 and the 4,145 public libraries that exist in the United Kingdom in the 21st century can trace their origins back to the act.

== Background ==
In the 1830s, at the height of the Chartist movement, there was a general tendency towards reformism in the United Kingdom. This prompted much new legislation to be passed, such as the Parliamentary Reform Act 1832 (2 & 3 Will. 4. c. 45), the Factory Act 1833 (3 & 4 Will. 4. c. 103), the first instance of a government grant for education in the same year and the Poor Law Amendment Act 1834 (4 & 5 Will. 4. c. 76). The capitalist economic model had created shift patterns which left workers with free time, in contrast to the agrarian model, and the middle classes were concerned that the workers’ free time was not being well-spent. This was prompted more by Victorian middle-class paternalism rather than by demand from the lower social orders. Campaigners felt that encouraging the lower classes to spend their free time on morally uplifting activities, such as reading, would promote greater social good.

In 1835, and against government opposition, James Silk Buckingham, MP for Sheffield and a supporter of the temperance movement, was able to secure the Chair of the select committee which would examine "the extent, causes, and consequences of the prevailing vice of intoxication among the labouring classes of the United Kingdom" and propose solutions. Francis Place, a campaigner for the working class, agreed that "the establishment of parish libraries and district reading rooms, and popular lectures on subjects both entertaining and instructive to the community might draw off a number of those who now frequent public houses for the sole enjoyment they afford". Buckingham introduced to Parliament a Public Institution Bill allowing boroughs to charge a tax to set up libraries and museums, the first of its kind. Although this did not become law, it had a major influence on William Ewart MP and Joseph Brotherton MP, who introduced a bill which would "[empower] boroughs with a population of 10,000 or more to raise a 1/2d for the establishment of museums". This became the Museums Act 1845 (8 & 9 Vict. c. 43).

== 1849 select committee ==
The advocacy of Ewart and Brotherton then succeeded in having a select committee set up to consider public library provision. A paper entitled "A statistical view of the principal public libraries in Europe and the United States" by Edward Edwards, an assistant at the British Museum Library, came to Ewart's attention and Edwards became a key witness to the select committee. Edwards was "a self taught former bricklayer ... passionately convinced of the value and significance of libraries". The select committee of 1849 produced a report in which Edwards and Ewart ensured that "no stone was left unturned" in proving their case that existing public library provision was inadequate and that provision in other countries was far superior. The select committee reported that "while we learn that, more than half a century ago, the first step taken by a foreign writer was to consult a public library on the subject of his studies or composition; we find that no such auxiliary was at the service of the British intellect". The report also argued that the provision of public libraries would steer people towards temperate and moderate habits, the same argument as was made by James Silk Buckingham fifteen years earlier. With a view to maximising the potential of current facilities, the committee made certain proposals, including:

- public use of university libraries
- improved public access to the British Museum Library
- duplicate books from the British Museum Library collection to be redistributed to local libraries

In order to achieve such ends, the committee made two significant recommendations. They suggested that the government should issue grants to aid the foundation of libraries and that the Museums Act 1845 should be amended and extended to allow for a tax to be levied for the establishment of public libraries. However, it was not thought necessary to subsidise stock provision for the libraries so the levy was to be used to provide buildings, furnishings and staff salaries. The authors of the report believed that donations from members of the public would be more than adequate to stock the new libraries.

== Public Libraries Act 1850 ==
The 1850 act was much more contentious than the Museums Act 1845 (8 & 9 Vict. c. 43). The major arguments against the bill included:

- Although the boroughs were represented by elected bodies, many people argued that the act enforced taxation without consent.
- There was opposition to the act simply on the grounds that founding and maintaining the new libraries would mean an increase in taxation at all, consensual or otherwise.
- Concerns were expressed that it would infringe on private enterprise and the existing library provision such as mechanics' institutes.
- Access to certain publications would neither promote civil society nor act as a form of social control, and libraries would instead become sites of social agitation. This issue was linked to the common concern that extending education to the lower orders of society would lead to libraries becoming working class "lecture halls" "which would give rise to an unhealthy agitation".
- Others felt that there were more pressing concerns, and wondered about the necessity for a library when literacy levels were so low.

In contrast many people favoured it, provided there was a cap on the level of taxation, on the grounds that:

- Public libraries would provide facilities for self-improvement through books and reading for all classes, not just those who were wealthy enough to afford their own private libraries and collections.
- The greater levels of education attained by providing public libraries would result in lower crime rates.

In order to get the bill passed through Parliament, a number of concessions had to be made to its original content. The compromises made included limiting the act to boroughs with populations of more than 10,000 where at least two-thirds of local ratepayers had to vote in favour of provision in a local referendum. The bill would repeal the Museums Act 1845 (8 & 9 Vict. c. 43) and so, in order to continue funding museums of arts and science as well as the new free libraries, local rates could be increased, but by no more than 1/2d per £1. As stated in the bill however, it was only permitted to spend this levy on library and museum buildings and staff but not on purchasing books and other stock.

== Scottish and Irish provision ==
Public Libraries Act 1853
- Act of Parliament
- Parliament of the United Kingdom
- Long title: An Act to extend the Public Libraries Act, 1850, to Ireland and Scotland.
- Citation: 16 & 17 Vict. c. 101
- Territorial extent: Scotland; Ireland

Dates
- Royal assent: 20 August 1853
- Commencement: 20 August 1853
- Repealed: Scotland: 31 July 1854; Ireland: 26 June 1855
Other legislation
Amends	Public Libraries Act 1850
Repealed by	Scotland: Public Libraries (Scotland) Act 1854; Ireland: Public Libraries (Ireland) Act 1855

Status: Repealed

Text of statute as originally enacted

Public Libraries (Scotland) Act 1854 (Note: Section 3.)
- Act of Parliament
- Parliament of the United Kingdom
- Long title: An Act to amend an Act of the last Session for extending the Public Libraries Act, 1850, to Ireland and Scotland.
- Citation: 17 & 18 Vict. c. 64
- Territorial extent: United Kingdom

Dates
- Royal assent: 31 July 1854
- Commencement: 31 July 1854
- Repealed: 15 July 1867
Other legislation
Amends	Public Libraries Act 1853
Amended by	Public Libraries Amendment Act (England and Scotland) 1866
Repealed by	Public Libraries (Scotland) Act 1867

Status: Repealed

Text of statute as originally enacted

Public Libraries (Ireland) Act 1855 (Note: Section 2 provided that the act may be cited as Public Libraries Act (Ireland) 1855.) (Note: The citation of this act by this short title was authorised by section 5 of, and the second schedule to, the Statute Law Revision Act 1948. Due to the repeal of those provisions, it is now authorised by section 19(2) of the Interpretation Act 1978.)
- Act of Parliament
- Parliament of the United Kingdom
- Long title: An Act for further promoting the Establishment of Free Public Libraries and Museums in Ireland.
- Citation: 18 & 19 Vict. c. 40
- Territorial extent: Ireland (Note: Long title.)

Dates
- Royal assent: 26 June 1855
- Commencement: 26 June 1855
- Repealed: 1981
Other legislation
Amends	Public Libraries Act 1853; Towns Improvement (Ireland) Act 1854
Amended by	Public Libraries Amendment Act 1877; Public Libraries Act 1884
Repealed by	Museums (Northern Ireland) Order 1981

Status: Repealed

Text of statute as originally enacted

The Public Libraries Act 1850 initially applied only to England and Wales, but it was extended to Scotland and Ireland by the Public Libraries Act 1853 (16 & 17 Vict. c. 101).

The following year the Public Libraries (Scotland) Act 1854 (17 & 18 Vict. c. 64) granted library authorities the for there to be a poll of ratepayers for the act to be adopted and uptake was instead authorised by a two-thirds majority at a public meeting of those who possessed or occupied a house of £10 annual value. This referred to homes that might reasonably be expected to have a net annual rental value of £10 a year or more. However, a poll could still be requested by any five voters present.

The Public Libraries (Ireland) Act 1855 made similar provisions for Ireland.

In 1855, similar amendments were introduced in England and Wales in the more wide-ranging Public Libraries Act 1855. This included provision for the 1d rate and the authority to buy books, newspapers, maps and specimens. It also contained the amendment that had already been made in Scotland, that of the two-thirds majority at a public meeting of ratepayers.

== Further legislation ==
The 1850 act was noteworthy because it established the principle of free public libraries, but in practice it was unsatisfactory. It placed many limitations on the type of councils that could adopt it, the amount of money that the boroughs were permitted to spend and the ways in which this money could be spent. Efforts were later made to develop the act further and remove many of these restrictions.

The Public Libraries Act 1855 (18 & 19 Vict. c. 70) increased the maximum rate that boroughs could charge to fund libraries to 1d. Like the 1850 act, the bill for this act had to be guided through the House of Commons by William Ewart. It met with a great deal of opposition and Ewart was obliged to abandon a proposal to enable municipal boroughs to adopt it by simple resolution of the town council.

There was some confusion regarding the provision of public libraries outside corporate towns; that is those towns incorporated by legal enactment and entitled to pass by-laws and use a common seal. This resulted in difficulties in extending public library provision to rural areas. The Public Libraries Act 1855 tried to resolve these difficulties by stating that a library authority could be a borough council, an improvement board or commission, a parish vestry or group of vestries, provided they covered a minimum population of 5,000. Since the 18th century, improvement boards had been established in many urban areas to take responsibility for paving, lighting and cleaning of streets, but over time their functions became wider in scope. From 1835 onwards, their responsibilities were assumed by elected town councils in the reformed boroughs but they continued in the urban areas outside the boroughs. Becoming a public library authority was another extension of their authority.

Public Libraries Amendment Act (England and Scotland) 1866 (Note: Section 11.)
- Act of Parliament
- Parliament of the United Kingdom
- Long title: An Act to amend the Public Libraries Act.
- Citation: 29 & 30 Vict. c. 114
- Territorial extent: England and Wales; Scotland; (Note: Section 11.)

Dates
- Royal assent: 10 August 1866
- Commencement: 10 August 1866
- Repealed: Scotland: 15 July 1867; England and Wales: 1 October 1892
Other legislation
Amends	Public Libraries Act (Scotland) 1854; Public Libraries Act 1855
Amended by	Public Libraries (Scotland) Act 1867; Public Libraries Amendment Act 1877
Repealed by	Scotland: Public Libraries (Scotland) Act 1867; England and Wales: Public Libraries Act 1892
Relates to	Towns Improvement Clauses Act 1847

Status: Repealed

Text of statute as originally enacted

A decade later, an amending act was passed, the Public Libraries Amendment Act (England and Scotland) 1866 (29 & 30 Vict. c. 114), which eliminated entirely the population limit and replaced the two-thirds majority previously required for adoption with a simple majority. It also allowed neighbouring parishes to combine with an existing or potential library authority. This act applies to both England and Wales and Scotland.

A year later the Public Libraries (Scotland) Act 1867 (30 & 31 Vict. c. 37) was passed to amend and consolidate the application of the law to Scotland. It established a form of library committee composed of a maximum of twenty members, of which half were to be members of the council and the other half to be selected by the council from householders.

== Legacy ==
The Public Library Acts of 1855 and 1866 were the last to be advanced by William Ewart, who retired in 1868. He had made great efforts to promote the public library system in Great Britain and perhaps his greatest achievement was the complete elimination of the population limits, as it allowed even very small towns or parishes to set up a public library. It was later found that this could present a problem, as many public libraries were established by library authorities that did not in fact have enough money to run a library satisfactorily.

Despite the rise in the level of tax public libraries could levy, it was still very difficult for boroughs to raise enough capital to fund new libraries. The growth of the public library movement in the wake of the 1850 act relied heavily on the donations of philanthropists such as Andrew Carnegie, John Passmore Edwards and Henry Tate.

== See also ==
- Public library
- Public Libraries Act
- List of libraries in the United Kingdom

== Bibliography ==
- LISU (2009). Number of Libraries. Accessed April 12, 2010.
- Kelly, Thomas (1973). History of Public Libraries in Great Britain 1845-1965. London: Library Association.
- Kelly, Thomas; Kelly, Edith (1977). Books for the People: An Illustrated History of the British Public Library. London: Andre Deutsch.
- McMenemy, David (2009). The Public Library. London: FACET.
- Max, Stanley M. (1984). "Tory Reaction to the Public Libraries Bill, 1850." Journal of Library History (1984): 504-524. in JSTOR
- Minto, J (1932). History of the Public Library Movement in Great Britain and Ireland London: Library Association
- Murison, W J (1971). The Public Library: its origins, purpose and significance (2nd ed), London: Harrap
- Sturges, P. (1996). "Conceptualizing the public library 1850–1919". In: Kinnell, M. and Sturges, P. (eds.) Continuity and Innovation in the Public Library: the Development of a Social Institution. London: Library Association.
