= List of statutory instruments of the United Kingdom, 1986 =

This is an incomplete list of statutory instruments of the United Kingdom in 1986.

== Statutory instruments ==
=== 1-499 ===
==== 1–100 ====
- Monmouth (Communities) Order 1986 (SI 1986/4) ??
- Mental Health (Northern Ireland) Order 1986 (SI 1986/4)
- Diseases of Animals (Approved Disinfectants) (Amendment) Order 1986 (SI 1986/5)
- Housing Revenue Account Rate Fund Contribution Limits (Scotland) Order 1986 (SI 1986/7)
- Blaby (Parishes) Order 1986 (SI 1986/14)
- Welwyn Hatfield (Parishes) Order 1986 (SI 1986/15)
- Thanet (Parishes) Order 1986 (SI 1986/19)
- Three Rivers (Parishes) Order 1986 (SI 1986/20)
- Local Government Superannuation Regulations 1986 (SI 1986/24)
- Textile Products (Indications of Fibre Content) Regulations 1986 (SI 1986/26)
- Statutory Sick Pay Up-rating Order 1986 (SI 1986/67)
- Salisbury (Parishes) Order 1986 (SI 1986/72)
- Riot (Damages) (Amendment) Regulations 1986 (SI 1986/76)

== 101–200 ==
- The Malvern Hills (Parishes) Order 1986 S.I. 1986/112
- The Taunton Deane (Parishes) Order 1986 S.I. 1986/113
- Police Cadets (Scotland) Amendment Regulations 1986 S.I. 1986/121
- The Durham (Parishes) Order 1986 S.I. 1986/122
- The Middlesbrough (Parishes) Order 1986 S.I. 1986/123
- Rate Support Grant (Scotland) (No. 4) Order 1985 S.I. 1986/140
- Merchant Shipping (Medical Stores) Regulations 1986 S.I. 1986/144
- General Medical Council (Registration (Fees) Regulations) Order of Council 1986 S.I. 1986/149
- Local Government Reorganisation (Compensation) Regulations 1986 S.I. 1986/151
- The Warwick (Parishes) Order 1986 S.I. 1986/160
- The Vale of White Horse (Parishes) Order 1986 S.I. 1986/161
- Bo'ness and Kinneil Light Railway Order 1986 (SI 1986/174)
- Local Authorities' Traffic Orders (Exemptions for Disabled Persons) (England and Wales) Regulations 1986 S.I. 1986/178
- The Hinckley and Bosworth (Parishes) Order 1986 S.I. 1986/186

== 201–300 ==
- The Clydebank District and Bearsden and Milngavie District (Whitehill Farm) Boundaries Amendment Order 1986 S.I. 1986/209 (S. 12)
- The Strathkelvin District and Bearsden and Milngavie District (Dougalston) Boundaries Amendment Order 1986 S.I. 1986/210 (S. 13)
- The Borough of Thamesdown (Electoral Arrangements) Order 1986 S.I. 1986/237
- The North Devon (Parishes) Order 1986 S.I. 1986/248
- Legal Advice and Assistance (Scotland) Amendment Regulations 1986 S.I. 1986/254
- East Lancashire Light Railway Order 1986 (SI 1986/277)
- The Borough of Halton (Electoral Arrangements) Order 1986 S.I. 1986/280
- The Durham (District Boundaries) Order 1986 S.I. 1986/281
- The South Staffordshire (Parishes) Order 1986 S.I. 1986/284
- Merchant Shipping (Indemnification of Shipowners) (Amendment) Order 1986 S.I. 1986/296
- Mersey Tunnels Order 1986 (SI 1986/297)

== 301–400 ==
- Certification Officer (Amendment of Fees) Regulations 1986 S.I. 1986/302
- The Milton Keynes (Parishes) Order 1986 S.I. 1986/308
- Block Grant (Education Adjustments) (Wales) Regulations 1986 S.I. 1986/314
- The Surrey (District Boundaries) Order 1986 S.I. 1986/321
- Merchant Shipping (Light Dues) (Amendment) Regulations 1986 S.I. 1986/334
- Seeds (National Lists of Varieties) (Fees) (Amendment) Regulations 1986 S.I. 1986/338
- Plant Breeders' Rights (Fees) (Amendment) Regulations 1986 S.I. 1986/339
- Bluebell Extension Light Railway Order 1986 (SI 1986/343)
- Rate Limitation (Designation of Authorities) (Exemption) Order 1986 S.I. 1986/344
- The Cherwell (Parishes) Order 1986 S.I. 1986/352
- Local Government Superannuation (Miscellaneous Provisions) Regulations 1986 S.I. 1986/380
- Housing Support Grant (Scotland) Order 1986 S.I. 1986/388
- Health and Safety (Miscellaneous Fees) Regulations 1986 S.I. 1986/392
- General Betting Duty Regulations 1986 S.I. 1986/400

== 401–500 ==
- Hartlepools Water (Consolidation, etc.) Order 1986 (SI 1986/401)
- Pilotage Commission Provision of Funds Scheme 1986 (Confirmation) Order 1986 (SI 1986/402)
- Civil Aviation (Navigation Services Charges) Regulations 1986 (SI 1986/403)
- General Betting Duty Regulations (Northern Ireland) 1986 (SI 1986/404)
- Misuse of Drugs (Licence Fees) Regulations 1986 (SI 1986/416)
- Prevention of Terrorism (Temporary Provisions) Act 1984 (Continuance) Order 1986 (SI 1986/417)
- Local Land Charges (Amendment) Rules 1986 (SI 1986/424)
- National Health Service (Charges for Drugs and Appliances) Amendment Regulations 1986 (SI 1986/432)
- Town and Country Planning (Local Government Reorganisation) (Miscellaneous Amendments) Regulations 1986 (SI 1986/443)
- Insurance (Fees) Regulations 1986 (SI 1986/446)
- High Court of Justiciary Fees Amendment Order 1986 (SI 1986/449)
- Court of Session etc. Fees Amendment Order 1986 (SI 1986/450)
- National Health Service (Charges to Overseas Visitors) Amendment Regulations 1986 (SI 1986/459)
- The Dairy Produce Quotas Regulations 1986 (SI 1986/470)
- Income Tax (Building Societies) Regulations 1986 (SI 1986/482)
- The Social Security (Unemployment, Sickness and Invalidity Benefit) Amendment Regulations 1986 (SI 1986/484)

== 501–600 ==
- Education (Grants for Training of Teachers and Community Education Workers) (Scotland) Regulations 1986 S.I. 1986/510
- The Borough of Blaenau Gwent (Electoral Arrangements) Order 1986 S.I. 1986/526
- The Borough of Brecknock (Electoral Arrangements) Order 1986 S.I. 1986/533
- The Borough of Lliw Valley (Electoral Arrangements) Order 1986 S.I. 1986/535
- The District of Monmouth (Electoral Arrangements) Order 1986 S.I. 1986/556
- Remuneration of Teachers (Primary and Secondary Education) (Amendment) Order 1986 S.I. 1986/559
- The Wokingham (Parishes) Order 1986 S.I. 1986/570
- Police (Scotland) Amendment Regulations 1986 S.I. 1986/576
- Patents (Fees) Rules 1986 S.I. 1986/583
- The Milton Keynes (Parishes) (No. 2) Order 1986 S.I. 1986/591
- Naval, Military and Air Forces etc. (Disablement and Death) Service Pensions Amendment Order 1986 S.I. 1986/592
- Education and Libraries (Northern Ireland) Order 1986 S.I. 1986/594
- Mental Health (Northern Ireland) Order 1986 S.I. 1986/595
- Transfer of Functions (Arts, Libraries and National Heritage) Order 1986 S.I. 1986/600

== 601–700 ==
- The South Holland (Parishes) Order 1986 S.I. 1986/602
- Industrial Assurance (Fees) Regulations 1986 S.I. 1986/608
- Friendly Societies (Fees) Regulations 1986 S.I. 1986/620
- Industrial and Provident Societies (Credit Unions) (Amendment of Fees) Regulations 1986 S.I. 1986/622
- The Borough of Torfaen (Electoral Arrangements) Order 1986 S.I. 1986/645
- Ionising Radiations (Fees for Approvals) Regulations 1986 S.I. 1986/669
- Legal Advice and Assistance (Scotland) Amendment (No. 2) Regulations 1986 S.I. 1986/673
- Legal Aid (Scotland) (Fees in Criminal Proceedings) Amendment Regulations 1986 S.I. 1986/674
- Merchant Shipping (Fishing Vessels) (Radios) (Fees) Regulations 1986 S.I. 1986/680
- Legal Aid (Scotland) (Fees in Civil Proceedings) Amendment Regulations 1986 S.I. 1986/681
- Public Record Office (Fees) Regulations 1986 S.I. 1986/697

== 701–800 ==
- Milk (Special Designation) Regulations 1986 (SI 1986/723)
- Commission on Disposals of Land (Northern Ireland) Order 1986 (SI 1986/767) (N.I. 5)
- Third Country Fishing (Enforcement) Order 1986 (SI 1986/779)

== 801–900 ==
- The Local Government (Records) Order 1986 S.I 1986/803
- Superannuation (Children's Pensions) (Earnings Limit) Order 1986 S.I. 1986/814
- Measuring Instruments (EEC Pattern Approval Requirements) (Fees) (Amendment) Regulations 1986 S.I. 1986/831
- Merchant Shipping (Fees) (Amendment No. 1) Regulations 1986 S.I. 1986/837
- National Assistance (Charges for Accommodation) Regulations 1986 S.I. 1986/861

== 901–1000 ==
- Excise Duties (Small Non-Commercial Consignments) Relief Regulations 1986 S.I. 1986/938
- Value Added Tax (Small Non-Commercial Consignments) Relief Order 1986 S.I. 1986/939
- Judicial Pensions (Preservation of Benefits) (Amendment No. 2) Order 1986 S.I. 1986/946
- Rampton Hospital Board (Establishment and Constitution) Order 1986 S.I. 1986/963
- National Health Service (General Ophthalmic Services) Regulations 1986 S.I. 1986/975
- Act of Sederunt (Fees of Solicitors in the Sheriff Court) 1986 S.I. 1986/978
- Nene Valley Light Railway Order 1986 (SI 1986/1000)

== 1001–1100 ==
- Public Service Vehicles (Traffic Regulation Conditions) Regulations 1986 S.I. 1986/1030
- Companies (Northern Ireland) Order 1986 S.I. 1986/1032
- Business Names (Northern Ireland) Order 1986 S.I. 1986/1033
- Companies Consolidation (Consequential Provisions) (Northern Ireland) Order 1986 S.I. 1986/1035
- Measuring Instruments (EEC Initial Verification Requirements) (Fees) (Amendment) Regulations 1986 S.I. 1986/1043
- Occupational Pension Schemes (Disclosure of Information) Regulations 1986 S.I. 1986/1046
- National Assistance (Charges for Accommodation) (Scotland) Regulations 1986 S.I. 1986/1050
- The Borough of Llanelli (Electoral Arrangements) Order 1986 S.I. 1986/1063
- Merchant Shipping (Life-Saving Appliances) Regulations 1986 S.I. 1986/1066
- Merchant Shipping (Chemical Tankers) Regulations 1986 S.I. 1986/1068
- Merchant Shipping (Gas Carriers) Regulations 1986 S.I. 1986/1073
- Road Vehicles (Construction and Use) Regulations 1986 S.I. 1986/1078

== 1101–1200 ==
- Pensions Increase (Review) Order 1986 S.I. 1986/1116
- Social Security Benefits Up-rating Order 1986 S.I. 1986/1117
- Social Security Benefits Up-rating Regulations 1986 S.I. 1986/1118
- Family Income Supplements (Computation) Regulations 1986 S.I. 1986/1120
- Supreme Court Funds (Amendment) Rules 1986 S.I. 1986/1142
- Northern Ireland (Emergency Provisions) Act 1978 (Continuance) (No. 2) Order 1986 S.I. 1986/1146
- Legal Aid (Scotland) (Child Abduction and Custody Act 1985) Regulations 1986 S.I. 1986/1154
- Child Abduction and Custody (Parties to Conventions) Order 1986 S.I. 1986/1159
- Judgments Enforcement (Amendment) (Northern Ireland) Order 1986 S.I. 1986/1166 (N.I. 11)
- Legal Advice and Assistance (Amendment) (Northern Ireland) Order 1986 S.I. 1986/1167 (N.I. 12)
- Offshore Installations (Safety Zones) (No. 63) Order 1986 S.I 1986/1193
- Offshore Installations (Safety Zones) (No. 69) Order 1986 S.I 1986/1199

== 1201–1300 ==
- Crown Roads (Royal Parks) (Application of Road Traffic Enactments) (Amendment) Order 1986 S.I 1986/1224
- Merchant Shipping (Fire Protection) (Non-United Kingdom) (Non-SOLAS) Rules 1986 S.I 1986/1248
- Diseases of Animals (Approved Disinfectants) (Amendment) (No. 2) Order 1986 S.I 1986/1290
- Safety of Sports Grounds (Designation) Order 1986 S.I 1986/1296

== 1301–1400 ==
- Housing (Northern Ireland) Order 1986 S.I. 1986/1301 (N.I. 13)
- Social Need (Northern Ireland) Order 1986 S.I. 1986/1302 (N.I. 14)
- Trade Marks and Service Marks (Relevant Countries) Order 1986 S.I. 1986/1303
- The Forest Heath (Parishes) Order 1986 S.I. 1986/1308
- Trade Marks and Service Marks Rules 1986 S.I. 1986/1319
- Education (Bursaries for Teacher Training) Regulations 1986 S.I. 1986/1324
- Transport Act 1982 (Commencement No. 6) Order 1986 S.I. 1986/1326
- Fixed Penalty (Procedure) Regulations 1986 S.I. 1986/1330
- Costs in Criminal Cases (General) Regulations 1986 S.I. 1986/1335
- Teachers (Colleges of Education) (Scotland) Amendment Regulations 1986 S.I. 1986/1353
- Legal Aid (Scotland) (General) Amendment Regulations 1986 S.I. 1986/1358
- Legal Advice and Assistance (Scotland) Amendment (No. 3) Regulations 1986 S.I. 1986/1359
- The Ceredigion (Communities) Order 1986 S.I. 1986/1364
- Police Pensions (Amendment) Regulations 1986 S.I. 1986/1379
- Police Pensions (Lump Sum Payments to Widows) Regulations 1986 S.I. 1986/1380

== 1401–1500 ==
- Trade Marks and Service Marks (Fees) Rules 1986 (SI 1986/1447)
- Community Drivers' Hours and Recording Equipment (Exemptions and Supplementary Provisions) Regulations 1986 (SI 1986/1456)
- Offshore Installations (Safety Zones) (No. 80) Order 1986 (SI 1986/1464)
- Offshore Installations (Safety Zones) (No. 81) Order 1986 (SI 1986/1465)
- The Preston (Parishes) Order 1986 (SI 1986/1470)

== 1501–1600 ==
- Home Purchase Assistance (Price-limits) Order 1986 S.I. 1986/1511
- Milk Quota (Calculation of Standard Quota) Order 1986 S.I. 1986/1530
- Land Registration (Delivery of Applications) Rules 1986 S.I. 1986/1534
- Land Registration (Official Searches) Rules 1986 S.I. 1986/1536
- Civil Aviation Authority (Economic Regulation of Airports) Regulations 1986 S.I. 1986/1544
- Offshore Installations (Safety Zones) (No. 83) Order 1986 S.I. 1986/1578
- Offshore Installations (Safety Zones) (No. 89) Order 1986 S.I. 1986/1584
- The North West Leicestershire (Parishes) Order 1986 S.I. 1986/1594

== 1601–1700 ==
- Milk (Community Outgoers Scheme) (England and Wales) Regulations 1986 S.I. 1986/1611
- Milk (Community Outgoers' Scheme) (Scotland) Regulations 1986 S.I. 1986/1613
- The Shropshire (District Boundaries) Order 1986 S.I. 1986/1619
- Saithe (Channel, Western Waters and Bay of Biscay) (Prohibition of Fishing) (Revocation) Order 1986 S.I. 1986/1620
- Food Protection (Emergency Prohibitions) (Wales) (No. 2) Order 1986 S.I. 1986/1681
- Food Protection (Emergency Prohibitions) (England) (No. 2) Order 1986 S.I. 1986/1689

== 1701–1800 ==
- Banking Act 1979 (Exempt Transactions) Regulations 1986 (SI 1986/1712)
- Combined Probation Areas Order 1986 (SI 1986/1713)
- Export of Sheep (Prohibition) (No. 2) Order 1986 (SI 1986/1734)
- Offshore Installations (Safety Zones) (No. 94) Order 1986 (SI 1986/1741)
- Offshore Installations (Safety Zones) (No. 99) Order 1986 (SI 1986/1746)

== 1801–1900 ==
- The Castlemartin RAC Range Bylaws 1986 S.I. 1986/1834
- Offshore Installations (Safety Zones) (No. 100) Order 1986 S.I. 1986/1839
- Offshore Installations (Safety Zones) (No. 102) Order 1986 S.I. 1986/1841
- Offshore Installations (Safety Zones) (No. 103) Order 1986 S.I. 1986/1842
- British Council and Commonwealth Institute Superannuation Act 1986 (Commencement No. 1) Order 1986 S.I. 1986/1860
- Criminal Justice (Northern Ireland) Order 1986 S.I. 1986/1883 (N.I. 15)
- Road Races (Northern Ireland) Order 1986 S.I. 1986/1887 (N.I. 17)
- Social Security (Northern Ireland) Order 1986 S.I. 1986/1888 (N.I. 18)

== 1901–2000 ==
- The Lancashire (District Boundaries) Order 1986 S.I. 1986/1909
- The Borough of Taunton Deane (Electoral Arrangements) Order 1986 S.I. 1986/1912
- Insolvency (Scotland) Rules 1986 S.I. 1986/1915
- Insolvency Act 1985 (Commencement No. 5) Order 1986 S.I. 1986/1924
- Merchant Shipping (Certification of Marine Engineer Officers and Licensing of Marine Engine Operators) Regulations 1986 S.I. 1986/1935
- Sole (Irish Sea and Sole Bank) (Prohibition of Fishing) Order 1986 S.I. 1986/1936
- Road Traffic (Carriage of Dangerous Substances in Packages etc.) Regulations 1986 S.I. 1986/1951
- The District of South Pembrokeshire (Electoral Arrangements) Order 1986 S.I. 1986/1963
- The District of Ceredigion (Electoral Arrangements) Order 1986 S.I. 1986/1964
- Social Security Act 1986 (Commencement No. 4) Order 1986 S.I. 1986/1959
- Statutory Maternity Pay (General) Regulations 1986 S.I. 1986/1960
- Rate Support Grant (Scotland) Order 1986 S.I. 1986/1965

== 2001–2100 ==
- Broadmoor Hospital Board (Establishment and Constitution) Order 1986 S.I. 1986/2004
- Moss Side and Park Lane Hospitals Board (Establishment and Constitution) Order 1986 S.I. 1986/2006
- The Carmarthen (Communities) Order 1986 S.I. 1986/2008
- The Montgomeryshire (Communities) Order 1986 S.I. 1986/2009
- Extradition (Internationally Protected Persons) Order 1986 S.I. 1986/2013
- Financial Provisions (Northern Ireland) Order 1986 S.I. 1986/2021
- Health and Personal Social Services (Amendment) (Northern Ireland) Order 1986 S.I. 1986/2023
- Rates (Amendment) (Northern Ireland) Order 1986 S.I. 1986/2024
- Reciprocal Enforcement of Foreign Judgments (Canada) Order 1986 S.I. 1986/2027
- Insolvency Fees Order 1986 S.I. 1986/2030
- The Epping Forest (Parishes) Order 1986 S.I. 1986/2045
- Offshore Installations (Safety Zones) (No. 107) Order 1986 S.I. 1986/2051
- Offshore Installations (Safety Zones) (No. 108) Order 1986 S.I. 1986/2052
- Offshore Installations (Safety Zones) (No. 111) Order 1986 S.I. 1986/2055
- Offshore Installations (Safety Zones) (No. 113) Order 1986 S.I. 1986/2057
- Offshore Installations (Safety Zones) (No. 114) Order 1986 S.I. 1986/2058
- Offshore Installations (Safety Zones) (No. 115) Order 1986 S.I. 1986/2059
- Sole (Specified Sea Areas) (Prohibition of Fishing) Order 1986 S.I. 1986/2060
- Cod (Specified Sea Areas) (Prohibition of Fishing) (Revocation) Order 1986 S.I. 1986/2075
- The Dinefwr (Communities) Order 1986 S.I. 1986/2077
- The Oldham (Parish of Crompton) Order 1986 S.I. 1986/2196
- The Broxtowe (Parishes) Order 1986 S.I. 1986/2197

== 2101–2200 ==
- Supreme Court Funds (Amendment No. 2) Rules 1986 S.I. 1986/2115
- Herring (Firth of Clyde) (Prohibition of Fishing) Order 1986 S.I. 1986/2122
- Vickers Shipbuilding and Engineering Limited (Barrow-in-Furness) Light Railway Order 1986 (SI 1986/2150)
- Crown Court (Amendment) Rules 1986 S.I. 1986/2151
- Building Societies (General Charge and Fees) Regulations 1986 S.I. 1986/2155
- Building Societies Act 1986 (Rules and Miscellaneous Transitional Provisions) Order 1986 S.I. 1986/2168
- Social Fund Maternity and Funeral Expenses (Claims and Payments) Regulations 1986 S.I. 1986/2172
- Social Fund Maternity and Funeral Expenses (General) Regulations 1986 S.I. 1986/2173
- Assured Tenancies (Prescribed Amount) Order 1986 S.I. 1986/2180
- Housing (Right to Buy) (Service Charges) Order 1986 S.I. 1986/2195
- Oldham (Parish of Crompton) Order 1986 S.I. 1986/2196

== 2201–2300 ==
- Education (No. 2) Act 1986 (Commencement No. 1) Order 1986 S.I. 1986/2203
- Local Elections (Principal Areas) Rules 1986 S.I. 1986/2214
- Local Elections (Parishes and Communities) Rules 1986 S.I. 1986/2215
- Social Security (Adjudication) Regulations 1986 S.I. 1986/2218
- House of Commons Disqualification Order 1986 S.I. 1986/2219
- Foreign Compensation (Union of Soviet Socialist Republics) (Registration and Determination of Claims) Order 1986 S.I. 1986/2222
- Enterprise Ulster (Continuation of Functions) (Northern Ireland) Order 1986 S.I. 1986/2228 (N.I. 23)
- Health and Personal Social Services and Public Health (Northern Ireland) Order 1986 S.I. 1986/2229 (N.I. 24)
- Recreation and Youth Service (Northern Ireland) Order 1986 S.I. 1986/2232 (N.I. 25)
- Food Protection (Emergency Prohibitions) (No. 10) Order 1986 S.I. 1986/2248
- Offshore Installations (Safety Zones) (No. 116) Order 1986 S.I. 1986/2272
- The Hertfordshire (District Boundaries) Order 1986 S.I. 1986/2278
- The Essex (District Boundaries) Order 1986 S.I. 1986/2279
- The Tynedale (Parishes) Order 1986 S.I. 1986/2280
- Rules of the Supreme Court (Amendment No. 3) S.I. 1986/2289
- Control of Pollution (Anti-Fouling Paints) (Amendment) Regulations 1986 S.I. 1986/2300

== 2301–2400 ==
- (A453) North East of Birmingham-Nottingham Trunk Road The Birmingham-Nottingham Route (A42 Ashby-de-la-Zouch to Kegworth Section) Order 1986 (SI 1986/2320)
- The Fylde (Parishes) Order 1986 (SI 1986/2335)
- The Pendle (Parishes) Order 1986 (SI 1986/2347)
- The Uttlesford (Parishes) Order 1986 (SI 1986/2348)
- The Dover (Parishes) Order 1986 (SI 1986/2349)
- The West Derbyshire (Parishes) Order 1986 (SI 1986/2350)
- The Maidstone (Parishes) Order 1986 (SI 1986/2351)
- The Maldon (Parishes) Order 1986 (SI 1986/2352)
- The Cotswold (Parishes) Order 1986 (SI 1986/2353)
- The West Devon (Parishes) Order 1986 (SI 1986/2354)

== 2601–2700 ==
- Community Drivers' Hours and Recording Equipment (Exemptions and Supplementary Provisions) (Amendment) Regulations 1986 (SI 1986/2669)

== See also ==
- List of statutory instruments of the United Kingdom
