= List of acts of the Parliament of the United Kingdom from 1898 =

This is a complete list of acts of the Parliament of the United Kingdom for the year 1898.

Note that the first parliament of the United Kingdom was held in 1801; parliaments between 1707 and 1800 were either parliaments of Great Britain or of Ireland). For acts passed up until 1707, see the list of acts of the Parliament of England and the list of acts of the Parliament of Scotland. For acts passed from 1707 to 1800, see the list of acts of the Parliament of Great Britain. See also the list of acts of the Parliament of Ireland.

For acts of the devolved parliaments and assemblies in the United Kingdom, see the list of acts of the Scottish Parliament, the list of acts of the Northern Ireland Assembly, and the list of acts and measures of Senedd Cymru; see also the list of acts of the Parliament of Northern Ireland.

The number shown after each act's title is its chapter number. Acts passed before 1963 are cited using this number, preceded by the year(s) of the reign during which the relevant parliamentary session was held; thus the Union with Ireland Act 1800 is cited as "39 & 40 Geo. 3 c. 67", meaning the 67th act passed during the session that started in the 39th year of the reign of George III and which finished in the 40th year of that reign. Note that the modern convention is to use Arabic numerals in citations (thus "41 Geo. 3" rather than "41 Geo. III"). Acts of the last session of the Parliament of Great Britain and the first session of the Parliament of the United Kingdom are both cited as "41 Geo. 3". Acts passed from 1963 onwards are simply cited by calendar year and chapter number.

All modern acts have a short title, e.g. the Local Government Act 2003. Some earlier acts also have a short title given to them by later acts, such as by the Short Titles Act 1896.

== 61 & 62 Vict. ==
The fourth session of the 26th Parliament of the United Kingdom, which met from 8 February 1898 until 12 August 1898.

=== Public general acts ===
Short title	Citation	Royal assent
Long title
Army (Annual) Act 1898 (repealed)	61 & 62 Vict. c. 1	29 March 1898
An Act to provide, during twelve months, for the Discipline and Regulation of the Army. (Repealed by Statute Law Revision Act 1908 (8 Edw. 7. c. 49) and Revision of the Army and Air Force Acts (Transitional Provisions) Act 1955 (3 & 4 Eliz. 2. c. 20))
Registration (Ireland) Act 1898 (repealed)	61 & 62 Vict. c. 2	29 March 1898
An Act to make provision with respect to the Registration of Electors for the purpose of Local Government in Ireland. (Repealed by Representation of the People Act 1918 (7 & 8 Geo. 5. c. 64))
Consolidated Fund (No. 1) Act 1898 (repealed)	61 & 62 Vict. c. 3	29 March 1898
An Act to apply certain sums out of the Consolidated Fund to the service of the years ending on the thirty-first day of March one thousand eight hundred and ninety-seven, one thousand eight hundred and ninety-eight, and one thousand eight hundred and ninety-nine. (Repealed by Statute Law Revision Act 1908 (8 Edw. 7. c. 49))
Greek Loan Act 1898 (repealed)	61 & 62 Vict. c. 4	1 April 1898
An Act to enable Her Majesty the Queen to carry into effect a Convention made for facilitating the raising of a Loan by the Government of Greece. (Repealed by Statute Law (Repeals) Act 1977 (c. 18))
Public Buildings Expenses Act 1898 (repealed)	61 & 62 Vict. c. 5	1 April 1898
An Act to provide for defraying the expenses of the purchase of Land and Buildings and the construction of Buildings and Works in connexion with certain Public Departments. (Repealed by Statute Law Revision Act 1958 (6 & 7 Eliz. 2. c. 46))
Special Juries Act 1898 (repealed)	61 & 62 Vict. c. 6	23 May 1898
An Act for amending the Law as to Special Juries. (Repealed by Juries Act 1949 (12, 13 & 14 Geo. 6. c. 27))
Bail Act 1898 (repealed)	61 & 62 Vict. c. 7	23 May 1898
An Act to amend the law with respect to Bail. (Repealed by Magistrates' Courts Act 1952 (15 & 16 Geo. 6 & 1 Eliz. 2. c. 55))
Sheriffs Tenure of Office (Scotland) Act 1898 (repealed)	61 & 62 Vict. c. 8	1 July 1898
An Act to amend the Law in regard to the Tenure of Office of Sheriffs in Scotland. (Repealed by Sheriff Courts (Scotland) Act 1907 (7 Edw. 7. c. 51))
Reserve Forces and Militia Act 1898 (repealed)	61 & 62 Vict. c. 9	1 July 1898
An Act to amend the Law relating to the Reserve Forces and Militia. (Repealed by Territorial Army and Militia Act 1921 (11 & 12 Geo. 5. c. 37), Auxiliary and Reserve Forces Act 1949 (12, 13 & 14 Geo. 6. c. 96), Army Reserve Act 1950 (14 Geo. 6. c. 32) and Air Force Reserve Act 1950 (14 Geo. 6. c. 33))
Finance Act 1898	61 & 62 Vict. c. 10	1 July 1898
An Act to grant certain duties of Customs and Inland Revenue, to alter other duties, and to amend the Law relating to Customs and Inland Revenue, and to make other provision for the financial arrangements of the year.
Suffragan Bishops Act 1898	61 & 62 Vict. c. 11	1 July 1898
An Act to explain the Act as to Suffragan Bishops. (Note: Suffragan Bishops Act 1534 (26 Hen. 8. c. 14))
Public Record Office Act 1898 (repealed)	61 & 62 Vict. c. 12	1 July 1898
An Act to amend the Public Record Office Act, 1877. (Note: Public Record Office Act 1877 (40 & 41 Vict. c. 55)) (Repealed by Public Records Act 1958 (6 & 7 Eliz. 2. c. 51))
East India Loan Act 1898 (repealed)	61 & 62 Vict. c. 13	1 July 1898
An Act to enable the Secretary of State in Council of India to raise Money in the United Kingdom for the Service of the Government of India. (Repealed by East India Loans Act 1937 (1 Edw. 8 & 1 Geo. 6. c. 14))
Merchant Shipping (Liability of Shipowners) Act 1898 (repealed)	61 & 62 Vict. c. 14	25 July 1898
An Act to amend the Merchant Shipping Act, 1894, (Note: Merchant Shipping Act 1894 (57 & 58 Vict. c. 60)) with respect to the Liability of Shipowners. (Repealed by Merchant Shipping (Liability of Shipowners and Others) Act 1958 (6 & 7 Eliz. 2. c. 62))
Societies' Borrowing Powers Act 1898 (repealed)	61 & 62 Vict. c. 15	25 July 1898
An Act to empower certain Societies to borrow Money from Persons and Corporations other than Members. (Repealed by Friendly Societies Act 1974 (c. 46))
Canals Protection (London) Act 1898	61 & 62 Vict. c. 16	25 July 1898
An Act to provide for the Protection of Dangerous Places on Canals in the County of London.
Solicitors (Ireland) Act 1898 (repealed)	61 & 62 Vict. c. 17	25 July 1898
An Act to amend and consolidate the Laws relating to Solicitors and to the service of Indentured Apprentices in Ireland. (Repealed by Solicitors (Northern Ireland) Order 1976 (SI 1976/582 (N.I. 12)))
Post Office (Guarantee) Act 1898 (repealed)	61 & 62 Vict. c. 18	25 July 1898
An Act to make better provision for the guarantee of Postal Facilities by Local Authorities. (Repealed by Post Office Act 1908 (8 Edw. 7. c. 48))
Poor Law Unions Association (Expenses) Act 1898 (repealed)	61 & 62 Vict. c. 19	25 July 1898
An Act to provide for the establishment of a Poor Law Unions Association in England and Wales, and to enable Boards of Guardians to contribute to the expenses of the Association. (Repealed by Poor Law Act 1927 (17 & 18 Geo. 5. c. 14))
Ex-officio Justices of the Peace (Scotland) Act 1898 (repealed)	61 & 62 Vict. c. 20	25 July 1898
An Act to exempt certain Ex-officio Justices of the Peace in Scotland who have already taken the Oath from again taking oath before acting as Justices of the Peace. (Repealed by District Courts (Scotland) Act 1975 (c. 20))
Poor Law (Scotland) Act 1898 (repealed)	61 & 62 Vict. c. 21	25 July 1898
An Act to further amend the Law relating to the Settlement and Removal of the Poor in Scotland. (Repealed by National Assistance Act 1948 (11 & 12 Geo. 6. c. 29))
Statute Law Revision Act 1898 (repealed)	61 & 62 Vict. c. 22	25 July 1898
An Act for further promoting the Revision of the Statute Law by repealing Enactments which have ceased to be in force or become unnecessary. (Repealed by Statute Law (Repeals) Act 1998 (c. 43))
Union of Benefices Act 1898 (repealed)	61 & 62 Vict. c. 23	25 July 1898
An Act to amend the Union of Benefices Act, 1860. (Note: Union of Benefices Act 1860 (23 & 24 Vict. c. 142)) (Repealed by Pastoral Measure 1968 (No. 1) and Statute Law (Repeals) Act 1974 (c. 22))
Greenwich Hospital Act 1898 (repealed)	61 & 62 Vict. c. 24	25 July 1898
An Act to amend the Greenwich Hospital Acts, 1865 to 1892. (Repealed by Statute Law (Repeals) Act 1976 (c. 16))
Pharmacy Acts Amendment Act 1898 (repealed)	61 & 62 Vict. c. 25	25 July 1898
An Act to amend the Pharmacy Acts, 1852 (Note: Pharmacy Act 1852 (15 & 16 Vict. c. 56)) and 1868. (Note: Pharmacy Act 1868 (31 & 32 Vict. c. 121)) (Repealed by Pharmacy Act 1953 (1 & 2 Eliz. 2. c. 19))
Companies Act 1898 (repealed)	61 & 62 Vict. c. 26	2 August 1898
An Act to amend the Companies Act, 1867. (Note: Companies Act 1867 (30 & 31 Vict. c. 131)) (Repealed by Companies (Consolidation) Act 1908 (8 Edw. 7. c. 69))
Isle of Man (Customs) Act 1898 (repealed)	61 & 62 Vict. c. 27	2 August 1898
An Act to amend the Law with respect to Customs Duties in the Isle of Man. (Repealed by Isle of Man (Customs) Act 1930 (20 & 21 Geo. 5. c. 42))
Mussels, Periwinkles and Cockles (Ireland) Act 1898 (repealed)	61 & 62 Vict. c. 28	2 August 1898
An Act to develop the Fisheries of Mussels in Ireland. (Repealed by Fisheries Act (Northern Ireland) 1966 (c. 17 (N.I.)))
Locomotives Act 1898 (repealed)	61 & 62 Vict. c. 29	2 August 1898
An Act to amend the Law with respect to the use of Locomotives on Highways, and with respect to extraordinary Traffic. (Repealed by Statute Law (Repeals) Act 1993 (c. 50))
Pauper Children (Ireland) Act 1898 (repealed)	61 & 62 Vict. c. 30	2 August 1898
An Act to make further provision with respect to the Relief of Pauper Children in Ireland, and for other purposes connected therewith. (Repealed by Children and Young Persons Act (Northern Ireland) 1950 (c. 5 (N.I.)))
Metropolitan Police Courts Act 1898 (repealed)	61 & 62 Vict. c. 31	2 August 1898
An Act to amend the Metropolitan Police Courts Act, 1897. (Note: Metropolitan Police Courts Act 1897 (60 & 61 Vict. c. 26)) (Repealed for England and Wales and Scotland by Justices of the Peace Act 1949 (12, 13 & 14 Geo. 6. c. 101) and for Northern Ireland by Statute Law Revision Act 1950 (14 Geo. 6. c. 6))
Consolidated Fund (No. 2) Act 1898 (repealed)	61 & 62 Vict. c. 32	2 August 1898
An Act to apply a sum out of the Consolidated Fund to the service of the year ending on the thirty-first day of March one thousand eight hundred and ninety-nine. (Repealed by Statute Law Revision Act 1908 (8 Edw. 7. c. 49))
Telegraph (Money) Act 1898 (repealed)	61 & 62 Vict. c. 33	2 August 1898
An Act to provide for raising further Money for the purpose of the Telegraph Acts, 1863 to 1897. (Repealed by Statute Law Revision Act 1950 (14 Geo. 6. c. 6))
Rivers Pollution Prevention (Border Councils) Act 1898 (repealed)	61 & 62 Vict. c. 34	2 August 1898
An Act to enable the County Councils on either side of the Border to act together for the prevention of the Pollution of Rivers. (Repealed by Rivers (Prevention of Pollution) Act 1951 (14 & 15 Geo. 6. c. 64))
Vexatious Actions (Scotland) Act 1898 (repealed)	61 & 62 Vict. c. 35	12 August 1898
An Act to prevent vexatious Legal Proceedings in Scotland. (Repealed for England and Wales by Courts Reform (Scotland) Act 2014 (Consequential Provisions and Modifications) Order 2015 (SI 2015/700) and for Scotland by Courts Reform (Scotland) Act 2014 (asp 18))
Criminal Evidence Act 1898	61 & 62 Vict. c. 36	12 August 1898
An Act to amend the Law of Evidence. (Repealed for Scotland by Criminal Procedure (Scotland) Act 1975 (c. 21))
Local Government (Ireland) Act 1898	61 & 62 Vict. c. 37	12 August 1898
An Act for amending the Law relating to Local Government in Ireland, and for other purposes connected therewith.
Parish Fire-Engines Act 1898 (repealed)	61 & 62 Vict. c. 38	12 August 1898
An Act to enable Parish Councils to borrow Fire-Engines. (Repealed by Fire Brigades Act 1938 (1 & 2 Geo. 6. c. 72))
Vagrancy Act 1898	61 & 62 Vict. c. 39	12 August 1898
An Act to amend the Vagrancy Act, 1824. (Note: Vagrancy Act 1824 (5 Geo. 4. c. 83)) (Repealed for England and Wales by Sexual Offences Act 1956 (4 & 5 Eliz. 2. c. 69) and for Scotland by Sexual Offences Act 2003 (c. 42))
Circuit Clerks (Scotland) Act 1898 (repealed)	61 & 62 Vict. c. 40	12 August 1898
An Act to amend the Law regarding the Circuit Clerks of Justiciary in Scotland. (Repealed by Criminal Justice (Scotland) Act 1987 (c. 41))
Prison Act 1898	61 & 62 Vict. c. 41	12 August 1898
An Act to amend the Prisons Acts. (Repealed for England and Wales by Prison Act 1952 (15 & 16 Geo. 6 & 1 Eliz. 2. c. 52))
Trusts (Scotland) Act 1898 (repealed)	61 & 62 Vict. c. 42	12 August 1898
An Act to amend the Trusts (Scotland) Amendment Act, 1884. (Note: Trusts (Scotland) Amendment Act 1884 (47 & 48 Vict. c. 63)) (Repealed by Trusts (Scotland) Act 1921 (11 & 12 Geo. 5. c. 58))
Metropolitan Commons Act 1898 (repealed)	61 & 62 Vict. c. 43	12 August 1898
An Act to amend the Metropolitan Commons Acts. (Repealed by Local Government Act 1985 (c. 51))
Merchant Shipping (Mercantile Marine Fund) Act 1898	61 & 62 Vict. c. 44	12 August 1898
An Act to amend the Law with regard to the provision for the payment of certain Expenses under the Merchant Shipping Act, 1894, and with regard to the levying of Light Dues.
Metropolitan Poor Act 1898 (repealed)	61 & 62 Vict. c. 45	12 August 1898
An Act to amend Section Sixty-nine of the Metropolitan Poor Act, 1867, (Note: Metropolitan Poor Act 1867 (30 & 31 Vict. c. 6)) as to the Expenses payable out of the Metropolitan Common Poor Fund. (Repealed by Poor Law Act 1927 (17 & 18 Geo. 5. c. 14))
Revenue Act 1898	61 & 62 Vict. c. 46	12 August 1898
An Act for amending the Law relating to Customs and Inland Revenue and for other purposes connected with Finance.
Expiring Laws Continuance Act 1898 (repealed)	61 & 62 Vict. c. 47	12 August 1898
An Act to continue various Expiring Laws. (Repealed by Statute Law Revision Act 1908 (8 Edw. 7. c. 49))
Benefices Act 1898	61 & 62 Vict. c. 48	12 August 1898
An Act to amend the Law relating to the Patronage of Benefices, and to their avoidance on Sequestration, and to amend the Pluralities Acts 1838 (Note: Pluralities Act 1838 (1 & 2 Vict. c. 106)) and 1885. (Note: Pluralities Acts Amendment Act 1885 (48 & 49 Vict. c. 54))
Vaccination Act 1898 (repealed)	61 & 62 Vict. c. 49	12 August 1898
An Act to Amend the Law with respect to Vaccination. (Repealed by National Health Service Act 1946 (9 & 10 Geo. 6. c. 81))
Seed Supply and Potato Spraying (Ireland) Act 1898 (repealed)	61 & 62 Vict. c. 50	12 August 1898
An Act to provide for the Supply of Seed Potatoes, Seed Oats, and Spraying Machines and Material to Occupiers and Cultivators of Land in Ireland, and for the employment of Instructors in the use of such Machines and Material. (Repealed by Statute Law Revision Act 1908 (8 Edw. 7. c. 49))
Out-door Relief (Ireland) Act 1898 (repealed)	61 & 62 Vict. c. 51	12 August 1898
An Act to make temporary provision for the Relief of Distress in Ireland. (Repealed by Statute Law Revision Act 1908 (8 Edw. 7. c. 49))
Kingstown Township (Transfer of Harbour Roads) Act 1898	61 & 62 Vict. c. 52	12 August 1898
An Act to transfer to the Commissioners of the Township of Kingstown certain Roads and Lands now vested in the Commissioners of Kingstown Harbour, and for other purposes.
Libraries Offences Act 1898	61 & 62 Vict. c. 53	12 August 1898
An Act to provide for the Punishment of Offences in Libraries.
Public Works Loans Act 1898 (repealed)	61 & 62 Vict. c. 54	12 August 1898
An Act to grant Money for the purpose of certain Local Loans, and for other purposes relating to Loans out of the Local Loans Fund. (Repealed for England and Wales and Scotland by Statute Law Revision Act 1908 (8 Edw. 7. c. 49), Local Government Act 1929 (19 & 20 Geo. 5. c. 17) and Statute Law Revision Act 1950 (14 Geo. 6. c. 6) and for Northern Ireland by Public Works &c Loans Act (Northern Ireland) 1953 (c. 13 (N.I.)))
Universities and College Estates Act 1898 (repealed)	61 & 62 Vict. c. 55	12 August 1898
An Act to amend the Universities and College Estates Acts, 1853 to 1880. (Repealed by Universities and College Estates Act 1925 (15 & 16 Geo. 5. c. 24))
Local Taxation Account (Scotland) Act 1898 (repealed)	61 & 62 Vict. c. 56	12 August 1898
An Act to make provision in regard to the distribution and application of further sums from time to time paid to the Local Taxation (Scotland) Account. (Repealed by Local Government (Scotland) Act 1929 (19 & 20 Geo. 5. c. 25))
Elementary School Teachers (Superannuation) Act 1898 (repealed)	61 & 62 Vict. c. 57	12 August 1898
An Act to provide for Superannuation and other Annuities and Allowances to Elementary School Teachers certificated by the Education Department. (Repealed by Education (Scotland) (Superannuation) Act 1919 (9 & 10 Geo. 5. c. 17) and Teachers' Superannuation Act 1965 (c. 83))
Marriage Act 1898 (repealed)	61 & 62 Vict. c. 58	12 August 1898
An Act to amend the Law relating to the Attendance of Registrars at Marriages in Nonconformist Places of Worship. (Repealed by Marriage Act 1949 (12, 13 & 14 Geo. 6. c. 76))
Post Office Guarantee (No. 2) Act 1898 (repealed)	61 & 62 Vict. c. 59	12 August 1898
An Act to extend to Borough and Urban District Councils the powers to guarantee Postal and Telegraphic Facilities already possessed by Rural Councils. (Repealed by Post Office Act 1908 (8 Edw. 7. c. 48))
Inebriates Act 1898	61 & 62 Vict. c. 60	12 August 1898
An Act to provide for the treatment of Habitual Inebriates. (Repealed for Scotland by Licensing (Scotland) Act 2005 (Consequential Provisions) Order 2009 (SSI 2009/248))
Appropriation Act 1898 (repealed)	61 & 62 Vict. c. 61	12 August 1898
An Act to apply a sum out of the Consolidated Fund to the service of the year ending on the thirty-first day of March one thousand eight hundred and ninety-nine, and to appropriate the Supplies granted in this Session of Parliament. (Repealed by Statute Law Revision Act 1908 (8 Edw. 7. c. 49))
University of London Act 1898 (repealed)	61 & 62 Vict. c. 62	12 August 1898
An Act to make further provision with respect to the University of London. (Repealed by Statute Law (Repeals) Act 1977 (c. 18))

=== Local acts ===
Short title	Citation	Royal assent
Long title
Lancashire County Council (Bridges) Act 1898 (repealed)	61 & 62 Vict. c. i	23 May 1898
An Act to make better provision respecting the charge and management of County Bridges and of Hundred Bridges in the County of Lancaster and to confer further powers on the County Council of the County Palatine of Lancaster in relation to bridges and for other purposes. (Repealed by County of Lancashire Act 1984 (c. xxi))
Writers to the Signet Widows' Fund Act 1898 (repealed)	61 & 62 Vict. c. ii	23 May 1898
An Act to further regulate the working management and control of the Widows Fund of the Writers to Her Majesty's Signet in Scotland to enlarge the powers of investment of the moneys of the Fund to amend the Acts now regulating the Fund and for other purposes. (Repealed by Writers to the Signet Widows' Fund Order Confirmation Act 1955 (4 & 5 Eliz. 2. c. ii))
Midlothian and Peebles District Board of Lunacy (Water Supply) Act 1898	61 & 62 Vict. c. iii	23 May 1898
An Act to empower the District Board of Lunacy for the landward portion of Midlothian and county of Peebles to construct Waterworks for the supply of water to their Rosslynlee Asylum to make provision for the cost of such works and for other purposes.
Mersey Docks (Various Powers) Act 1898	61 & 62 Vict. c. iv	23 May 1898
An Act to confer further powers upon and to amend certain of the Acts relating to the Mersey Docks and Harbour Board and to enable that Board to borrow further money and for other purposes.
Agricultural Company of Mauritius Act 1898	61 & 62 Vict. c. v	23 May 1898
An Act for amending the powers of the Agricultural Company of Mauritius Limited to sub-divide their capital into Preference and Ordinary Capital and for other purposes.
Guy's Hospital Act 1898	61 & 62 Vict. c. vi	23 May 1898
An Act for conferring further powers on the President and Governors of Guys Hospital.
Patriotic Assurance Company Act 1898	61 & 62 Vict. c. vii	23 May 1898
An Act to enlarge and extend the powers and objects of the Patriotic Assurance Company and for other purposes.
Tyne Improvement (Constitution and Works) Act 1898 (repealed)	61 & 62 Vict. c. viii	23 May 1898
An Act for enlarging the constitution of the Tyne Improvement Commission for conferring further powers upon the Tyne Improvement Commissioners and for amending certain of the provisions of the Tyne Improvement Acts 1850 to 1897 and for other purposes. (Repealed by Port of Tyne Reorganisation Scheme 1967 Confirmation Order 1968 (SI 1968/942))
Aberystwyth Gas Act 1898	61 & 62 Vict. c. ix	23 May 1898
An Act for granting further powers to the Aberystwyth Gas Company.
Folkestone Gas Act 1898	61 & 62 Vict. c. x	23 May 1898
An Act for granting further powers to the Folkestone Gas and Coke Company.
City and South London Railway Act 1898	61 & 62 Vict. c. xi	23 May 1898
An Act to confer further powers upon the City and South London Railway Company for the construction of works and acquisition of lands and for other purposes.
Eastern Telegraph Company Act 1898	61 & 62 Vict. c. xii	23 May 1898
An Act for the conversion of the existing Preference Stock of the Eastern Telegraph Company Limited and for other purposes.
St. Matthew Bethnal Green (Church Rate Abolition) Act 1898	61 & 62 Vict. c. xiii	23 May 1898
An Act to abolish the Composition Rate now leviable for certain Church purposes in the parish of Saint Matthew Bethnal Green in the county of London and to make other provisions for securing the stipend of the Rector of Saint Matthew Bethnal Green and the maintenance of the fabrics of the Churches of Saint Matthew Bethnal Green and Saint John Bethnal Green and for other purposes,
Upper Assam Tea Company Act 1898	61 & 62 Vict. c. xiv	23 May 1898
An Act for enabling the Upper Assam Tea Company Limited to arrange with the holders of their preference capital and for other purposes.
Edinburgh and Leith Corporation Gas Act 1898 (repealed)	61 & 62 Vict. c. xv	23 May 1898
An Act to authorise the Edinburgh and Leith Corporations Gas Commissioners to construct new gasworks and other works and to acquire lands and to confer further powers on the Commissioners in relation to their gas undertaking and for other purposes. (Repealed by Edinburgh Corporation Order Confirmation Act 1964 (c. xli))
Swansea Gas Act 1898	61 & 62 Vict. c. xvi	23 May 1898
An Act for conferring further powers on the Swansea Gaslight Company.
City of Waterford Gas Act 1898	61 & 62 Vict. c. xvii	23 May 1898
An Act for the granting of further powers to the City of Waterford Gas Company.
Chipstead Valley Railway Act 1898	61 & 62 Vict. c. xviii	23 May 1898
An Act for conferring further powers on the Chipstead Valley Railway Company and for other purposes.
London and North Western Railway (Steam Vessels) Act 1898	61 & 62 Vict. c. xix	23 May 1898
An Act for empowering the London and North Western Railway Company to provide and use Steam Vessels and for other purposes.
Warwick and Coalville Gas Act 1898 (repealed)	61 & 62 Vict. c. xx	23 May 1898
An Act for incorporating and conferring powers upon the Whitwick and Coalville Gas Company and for other purposes. (Repealed by Coalville Urban District Gas Act 1899 (62 & 63 Vict. c. xxiii))
Hartlepool Gas and Water Act 1898	61 & 62 Vict. c. xxi	23 May 1898
An Act to confer further powers upon the Hartlepool Gas and Water Company.
Edinburgh Merchant Company Act 1898 (repealed)	61 & 62 Vict. c. xxii	23 May 1898
An Act to amend and enlarge the powers of the Edinburgh Merchant Company to provide for the better administration of the said Company and the Widows' Fund and George Grindlay's and William Watherston's Endowments and for other purposes. (Repealed by Edinburgh Merchant Company Order Confirmation Act 1960 (8 & 9 Eliz. 2. c. xix))
Norton and Halton Roads Act 1898	61 & 62 Vict. c. xxiii	23 May 1898
An Act to relieve the Owner of the Norton Priory Estate in the County of Chester from the liability to repair certain roads in the said County and to provide for the future maintenance and repair thereof and for other purposes.
Edinburgh and District Waterworks Act 1898 (repealed)	61 & 62 Vict. c. xxiv	23 May 1898
An Act to authorise the Edinburgh and District Water Trustees to construct additional works to make deviations of authorised works and for other purposes. (Repealed by Edinburgh Corporation Order Confirmation Act 1958 (7 & 8 Eliz. 2. c. v))
Marianao and Havana Railway Company's Act 1898	61 & 62 Vict. c. xxv	23 May 1898
An Act to confirm the issue as fully paid of certain shares.
Morley Corporation (Gas, &c.) Act 1898	61 & 62 Vict. c. xxvi	23 May 1898
An Act to empower the Mayor Aldermen and Burgesses of the borough of Morley to purchase the undertakings of the Morley Gas Company and the Churwell Gas Light Company to make further provision in regard to the finance of the said borough and for other purposes.
Great Orme Tramways Act 1898	61 & 62 Vict. c. xxvii	23 May 1898
An Act for incorporating the Great Orme Tramways Company and for authorising the Company to make and maintain a Tramway and Tramroad from Llandudno to or near the summit of the Great Ormeshead in the county of Carnarvon.
Mersey Docks (New Works) Act 1898	61 & 62 Vict. c. xxviii	23 May 1898
An Act to authorise the Mersey Docks and Harbour Board to alter extend and improve their docks basins and works on the Liverpool side of the River Mersey and for other purposes.
Metropolitan Commons (Barnes) Supplemental Act 1898	61 & 62 Vict. c. xxix	23 May 1898
An Act to confirm an Amended Scheme under the Metropolitan Commons Acts 1866 to 1878 relating to Barnes Common in the Parish of Barnes Surrey.
	Barnes Common Scheme.	
Local Government Board (Ireland) Provisional Order Confirmation (No. 1) Act 1898	61 & 62 Vict. c. xxx	23 May 1898
An Act to confirm a Provisional Order of the Local Government Board for Ireland relating to the Balliney and Ballybrack Township.
	Killiney and Ballybrack Provisional Order 1898 Provisional Order authorising the purchase and taking of lands and premises otherwise than by agreement for the purposes of the Housing of the Working Classes Act 1890 (Note: Housing of the Working Classes Act 1890 (53 & 54 Vict. c. 70)) (Part III.).	
Local Government Board's Provisional Orders Confirmation (No. 1) Act 1898	61 & 62 Vict. c. xxxi	23 May 1898
An Act to confirm certain Provisional Orders of the Local Government Board relating to Bootle East-Stonehouse Epsom (Rural) Halifax (Rural) Hucknall-Torkard Leatherhead Ramsgate and Tewkesbury (Rural).
	Bootle Order 1898 Provisional Order to enable the Urban Sanitary Authority for the Borough of Bootle to put in force the Compulsory Clauses of the Lands Clauses Acts.	
	East Stonehouse Order 1898 Provisional Order to enable the Urban District Council of East Stonehouse to put in force the Compulsory Clauses of the Lands Clauses Acts.	
	Epsom Rural (Cobham) Order 1898 Provisional Order to enable the Rural District Council of Epsom to put in force the Compulsory Clauses of the Lands Clauses Acts.	
	Halifax Rural Order 1898 Provisional Order to enable the Rural District Council of Halifax to put in force the Compulsory Clauses of the Lands Clauses Acts.	
	Hucknall Torkard Order 1898 Provisional Order to enable the Urban District Council of Hucknall Torkard to put in force the Compulsory Clauses of the Lands Clauses Acts.	
	Leatherhead Order 1898 Provisional Order to enable the Urban District Council of Leatherhead to put in force the Compulsory Clauses of the Lands Clauses Acts.	
	Ramsgate Order 1898 Provisional Order to enable the Urban District Council for the Borough of Ramsgate to put in force the Compulsory Clauses of the Lands Clauses Acts.	
	Tewkesbury Rural Order 1898 Provisional Order to enable the Rural District Council of Tewkesbury to put in force the Compulsory Clauses of the Lands Clauses Acts.	
Local Government Board's Provisional Orders Confirmation (No. 2) Act 1898	61 & 62 Vict. c. xxxii	23 May 1898
An Act to confirm certain Provisional Orders of the Local Government Board relating to Eastbourne Oswaldtwistle Oswestry and Wallasey and to the Oakwell and Staines Joint Hospital Districts.
	Eastbourne Order 1898 Provisional Order for altering a Local Act (Note: Eastbourne Improvement Act 1885 (48 & 49 Vict. c. clxv)) and a Confirming Act. (Note: Local Government Board's Provisional Orders Confirmation (No. 18) Act 1895 Session 2 (59 Vict. Sess. 2. c. xii))	
	Oswaldtwistle Order 1898 Provisional Order for altering a Local Act (Note: Oswaldtwistle Local Board Act 1869 (32 & 33 Vict. c. lxvi)) and certain Confirming Acts.	
	Oswestry Order 1898 Provisional Order for altering a Confirming Act. (Note: Local Government Board's Provisional Orders Confirmation (Axminster Union &c.) Act 1879 (42 & 43 Vict. c. civ))	
	Wallasey Order 1898 Provisional Order for altering a Confirming Act. (Note: Local Government Board's Provisional Orders Confirmation (No. 12) Act 1892 (55 & 56 Vict. c. ccxxiii))	
	Oakwell Joint Hospital Order 1898 Provisional Order for altering a Confirming Act. (Note: Local Government Board's Provisional Orders Confirmation (No. 11) Act 1896 (59 & 60 Vict. c. cvi))	
	Staines Joint Hospital Order 1898 Provisional Order for partially repealing a Confirming Act. (Note: Local Government Board's Provisional Orders Confirmation (No. 3) Act 1882 (45 & 46 Vict. c. lxi))	
Customs and other Offices (Barry Dock) Act 1898	61 & 62 Vict. c. xxxiii	1 July 1898
An Act for acquiring Land for Customs and other Offices at Barry Dock and for other purposes connected therewith.
Customs Offices (Southampton) Act 1898	61 & 62 Vict. c. xxxiv	1 July 1898
An Act for the acquisition of Land at Southampton as a Site for Customs and other Offices connected therewith and for other purposes connected therewith.
Local Government Board's Provisional Orders Confirmation (No. 3) Act 1898	61 & 62 Vict. c. xxxv	1 July 1898
An Act to confirm certain Provisional Orders of the Local Government Board relating to Burnley (Rural) Cuckfield (Rural) Epping Fenny-Stratford Heston-and-Isleworth Keswick Sunderland Tadcaster (Rural) and Wetherby (Rural).
	Burnley Rural Order 1898 Provisional Order to enable the Rural District Council of Burnley to put in force the Compulsory Clauses of the Lands Clauses Acts.	
	Cuckfield Rural Order 1898 Provisional Order to enable the Rural District Council of Cuckfield to put in force the Compulsory Clauses of the Lands Clauses Acts.	
	Epping Order 1898 Provisional Order to enable the Urban District Council of Epping to put in force the Compulsory Clauses of the Lands Clauses Acts.	
	Fenny Stratford Order 1898 Provisional Order to enable the Urban District Council of Fenny Stratford to put in force the Compulsory Clauses of the Lands Clauses Acts.	
	Heston and Isleworth Order 1898 Provisional Order to enable the Urban District Council of Heston and Isleworth to put in force the Compulsory Clauses of the Lands Clauses Acts.	
	Keswick Order 1898 Provisional Order to enable the Urban District Council of Keswick to put in force the Compulsory Clauses of the Lands Clauses Acts.	
	Sunderland Order 1898 Provisional Order to enable the Urban Sanitary Authority for the Borough of Sunderland to put in force the Compulsory Clauses of the Lands Clauses Acts.	
	Tadcaster Rural Order 1898 Provisional Order to enable the Rural District Council of Tadcaster Tadcaster to put in force the Compulsory Clauses of the Lands Clauses Acts.	
	Wetherby Rural Order 1898 Provisional Order to enable the Rural District Council of Wetherby to put in force the Compulsory Clauses of the Lands Clauses Acts.	
Commons Regulation (Wolstanton Marsh) Provisional Order Confirmation Act 1898	61 & 62 Vict. c. xxxvi	1 July 1898
An Act to confirm a Provisional Order under the Inclosure Acts 1845 to 1882 relating to Wolstanton Marsh in the County of Stafford.
	Wolstanton Marsh Order 1898 Provisional Order for the Regulation of Wolstanton Marsh.	
Electric Lighting Orders Confirmation (No. 1) Act 1898 (repealed)	61 & 62 Vict. c. xxxvii	1 July 1898
An Act to confirm certain Provisional Orders made by the Board of Trade under the Electric Lighting Acts 1882 to 1890 relating to Airdrie Brechin Hamilton and Rothesay. (Repealed by North of Scotland Electricity Order Confirmation Act 1958 (7 & 8 Eliz. 2. c. ii))
	Airdrie Burgh Electric Lighting Order 1898 Provisional Order granted by the Board of Trade under the Electric Lighting Acts 1882 to 1890 to the Provost Magistrates and Town Council of the Burgh of Airdrie in respect of the Burgh of Airdrie in the County of Lanark.	
	Brechin Electric Lighting Order 1898 Provisional Order granted by the Board of Trade under the Electric Lighting Acts 1882 to 1890 to the Provost and Councillors of the Royal Burgh of Brechin in the County of Forfar in respect of the Royal Burgh of Brechin.	
	Hamilton Electric Lighting Order 1898 Provisional Order granted by the Board of Trade under the Electric Lighting Acts 1882 to 1890 to the Provost Magistrates and Councillors of the Burgh of Hamilton in the County of Lanark in respect of the said Burgh.	
	Rothesay Electric Lighting Order 1898 Provisional Order granted by the Board of Trade under the Electric Lighting Acts 1882 to 1890 to the Magistrates and Town Council of the Burgh of Rothesay in the County of Bute as Commissioners of the said Burgh in respect of the said Burgh.	
Electric Lighting Orders Confirmation (No. 2) Act 1898	61 & 62 Vict. c. xxxviii	1 July 1898
An Act to confirm certain Provisional Orders made by the Board of Trade under the Electric Lighting Acts 1882 (Note: Electric Lighting Act 1882 (45 & 46 Vict. c. 56)) and 1888 (Note: Electric Lighting Act 1888 (51 & 52 Vict. c. 12)) relating to Hartford East Ham Ilfracombe Ossett Rawmarsh and Rotherham.
	Dartford Electric Lighting Order 1898 Provisional Order granted by the Board of Trade under the Electric Lighting Acts 1882 and 1888 to the Urban District Council of Dartford in respect of the Urban District of Dartford in the County of Kent.	
	East Ham Electric Lighting Order 1898 Provisional Order granted by the Board of Trade under the Electric Lighting Acts 1882 and 1888 to the Urban District Council of East Ham in respect of the Urban District of East Ham in the County of Essex.	
	Ilfracombe Electric Lighting Order 1898 Provisional Order granted by the Board of Trade under the Electric Lighting Acts 1882 and 1888 to the Urban District Council of Ilfracombe in respect of the Urban District of Ilfracombe in the County of Devon.	
	Ossett Electric Lighting Order 1898 Provisional Order granted by the Board of Trade under the Electric Lighting Acts 1882 and 1888 to the Mayor Aldermen and Burgesses of the Borough of Ossett in respect of the Borough of Ossett in the West Riding of the County of York.	
	Rawmarsh Electric Lighting Order 1898 Provisional Order granted by the Board of Trade under the Electric Lighting Acts 1882 and 1888 to the Urban District Council of Rawmarsh in respect of the Urban District of Rawmarsh in the West Riding of the County of York.	
	Rotherham Corporation Electric Lighting Order 1898 Provisional Order granted by the Board of Trade under the Electric Lighting Acts 1882 and 1888 to the Mayor Aldermen and Burgesses of the Borough of Rotherham in respect of the Borough of Rotherham in the West Riding of the County of York.	
Electric Lighting Orders Confirmation (No. 3) Act 1898	61 & 62 Vict. c. xxxix	1 July 1898
An Act to confirm certain Provisional Orders mode by the Board of Trade under the Electric Lighting Acts 1882 and 1888 relating to Batley Hereford Hornsey Ilford Leigh-on-Sea and Lewes.
	Batley Electric Lighting Order 1898 Provisional Order granted by the Board of Trade under the Electric Lighting Acts 1882 and 1888 to the Mayor Aldermen and Burgesses of the Borough of Batley in respect of the Borough of Batley in the County of York West Riding.	
	Hereford Electric Lighting Order 1898 Provisional Order granted by the Board of Trade under the Electric Lighting Acts 1882 and 1888 to the Mayor Aldermen and Citizens of the City of Hereford in respect of the City of Hereford in the County of Hereford.	
	Hornsey Electric Lighting Order 1898 Provisional Order granted by the Board of Trade under the Electric Lighting Acts 1882 and 1888 to the Hornsey Urban District Council in respect of the Urban District of Hornsey in the County of Middlesex.	
	Ilford Electric Lighting Order 1898 Provisional Order granted by the Board of Trade under the Electric Lighting Acts 1882 and 1888 to the Ilford Urban District Council in respect of the Urban District of Ilford in the County of Essex.	
	Leigh-on-Sea Electric Lighting Order 1898 Provisional Order granted by the Board of Trade under the Electric Lighting Acts 1882 and 1888 to the Leigh-on-Sea Urban District Council in respect of the Urban District of Leigh-on-Sea in the County of Essex.	
	Lewes Corporation Electric Lighting Order 1898 Provisional Order granted by the Board of Trade under the Electric Lighting Acts 1882 and 1888 to the Mayor Aldermen and Burgesses of the Borough of Lewes in respect of the Borough of Lewes in the County of Sussex.	
Electric Lighting Orders Confirmation (No. 4) Act 1898	61 & 62 Vict. c. xl	1 July 1898
An Act to confirm certain Provisional Orders made by the Board of Trade under the Electric Lighting Acts 1882 and 1888 relating to Barnes Chichester Doncaster Hove (Aldrington) King’s Norton and Leatherhead.
	Barnes Electric Lighting Order 1898 Provisional Order granted by the Board of Trade under the Electric Lighting Acts 1882 and 1888 to the Urban District Council of Barnes in respect of the Urban District of Barnes in the County of Surrey.	
	Chichester Electric Lighting Order 1898 Provisional Order granted by the Board of Trade under the Electric Lighting Acts 1882 and 1888 to the Mayor Aldermen and Citizens of the City of Chichester in respect of the City of Chichester in the County of Sussex.	
	Doncaster Corporation Electric Lighting Order 1898 Provisional Order granted by the Board of Trade under the Electric Lighting Acts 1882 and 1888 to the Mayor Aldermen and Burgesses of the Borough of Doncaster in respect of the Borough of Doncaster in the County of York West Riding.	
	Hove (Aldrington) Electric Lighting Order 1898 Provisional Order granted by the Board of Trade under the Electric Lighting Acts 1882 and 1888 applied. for by the Urban District Council of the Town of Hove in respect of the Parish of Aldrington in the Urban District of the Town of Hove in the County of Sussex.	
	King's Norton Electric Lighting Order 1898 Provisional Order granted by the Board of Trade under the Electric Lighting Acts 1882 and 1888 applied for by the Rural District Council of King's Norton in the County of Worcester in respect of the Parishes of King's Norton and Northfield in the Rural District of King's Norton.	
	Leatherhead Electric Lighting Order 1898 Provisional Order granted by the Board of Trade under the Electric Lighting Acts 1882 and 1888 to the Leatherhead Urban District Council in respect of the Urban District of Leatherhead in the County of Surrey.	
Pilotage Order Confirmation Act 1898 (repealed)	61 & 62 Vict. c. xli	1 July 1898
An Act to confirm a Provisional Order made by the Board of Trade under the Merchant Shipping Act 1894 (Note: Merchant Shipping Act 1894 (57 & 58 Vict. c. 60)) relating to the Pilotage District of the Tees. (Repealed by Pilotage Orders Confirmation (No. 2) Act 1922 (12 & 13 Geo. 5. c. xiii))
	Tees Pilotage Order 1898 Order for making further Provision for the direct Representation of Pilots and Shipowners on the Tees Pilotage Commission and amending the Tees Pilotage Order 1881.	
Local Government Board (Ireland) Provisional Orders Confirmation (No. 2) Act 1898	61 & 62 Vict. c. xlii	1 July 1898
An Act to confirm certain Provisional Orders of the Local Government Board for Ireland relating to Clonmel Armagh Kildare and Baltinglass.
	Clonmel Provisional Order 1898 Provisional Order giving compulsory powers of purchasing lands. and premises for the purposes of Part III. of the Housing of the Working Classes Act 1890 for acquiring a Quarry and making a new Street.	
	Baltinglass Burial Ground Provisional Order 1898 Armagh Sewerage Works. Provisional Order.	
Local Government Board (Ireland) Provisional Order Confirmation (No. 4) Act 1898	61 & 62 Vict. c. xliii	1 July 1898
An Act to confirm a Provisional Order of the Local Government Board for Ireland relating to Belfast.
	Belfast (Local Act Amendment) Provisional Order 1898 Provisional Order amending Section 48 (1) of the Belfast Corporation Act 1896. (Note: Belfast Corporation Act 1896 (59 & 60 Vict. c. ccxlvi))	
Holmes's Patent Act 1898	61 & 62 Vict. c. xliv	1 July 1898
An Act for rendering valid certain Letters Patent granted to Thomas Holmes for Improvements in apparatus applicable to Twist Lace Machines.
Southend-on-Sea Gas Act 1898	61 & 62 Vict. c. xlv	1 July 1898
An Act to confer further powers on the Southend Gas Company.
Bakewell Gas Act 1898	61 & 62 Vict. c. xlvi	1 July 1898
An Act to authorise the Urban District Council of Bakewell to supply Gas and to provide for the transfer of the undertaking of the Bakewell Gaslight Company to the Council.
York United Gas Light Company Act 1898 (repealed)	61 & 62 Vict. c. xlvii	1 July 1898
An Act to authorise the York United Gas Light Company to raise additional capital and for other purposes. (Repealed by York Gas (Consolidation) Act 1912 (2 & 3 Geo. 5. c. lxxi))
Brompton, Chatham, Gillingham and Rochester Water Act 1898	61 & 62 Vict. c. xlviii	1 July 1898
An Act for conferring further powers upon the Brompton Chatham Gillingham and Rochester Waterworks Company and for other purposes.
Bombay, Baroda and Central India Railway Act 1898 (repealed)	61 & 62 Vict. c. xlix	1 July 1898
An Act for amending the Borrowing Powers of the Bombay Baroda and Central India Railway Company. (Repealed by Bombay, Baroda and Central India Railway Act 1906 (6 Edw. 7. c. lix))
Midland Railway Act 1898	61 & 62 Vict. c. l	1 July 1898
An Act to confer additional powers upon the Midland Railway Company for the construction of works and the acquisition of lands to confer powers upon that Company and the Lancashire and Yorkshire Railway Company and upon the Midland and Great Northern Railways Joint Committee for the acquisition of lands and for other purposes.
Foreign Cattle Market Deptford Act 1898	61 & 62 Vict. c. li	1 July 1898
An Act for the extension and enlargement of the Foreign Cattle Market at Deptford and to authorise the Corporation of the City of London to construct maintain and work certain railways and a tramway between the said Market and the Deptford Wharf Branch of the London Brighton and South Coast Railway and for other purposes.
St. Anne's-on-Sea Gas Act 1898 (repealed)	61 & 62 Vict. c. lii	1 July 1898
An Act for incorporating and conferring powers on the Saint Anne's-on-the-Sea Gas Company. (Repealed by Lytham St. Anne's Corporation Act 1923 (13 & 14 Geo. 5. c. lxxxvi))
City of Belfast (Hospitals) Act 1898	61 & 62 Vict. c. liii	1 July 1898
An Act to authorise the Commissioners for General Control and Correspondence and for the superintending and directing the Erection Establishment and Regulation of Asylums for the Lunatic Poor in Ireland to transfer certain lands for Hospital purposes to the Corporation of Belfast and to the Trustees of the Royal Victoria Hospital Belfast.
Crowhurst Sidley and Bexhill Railway Act 1898	61 & 62 Vict. c. liv	1 July 1898
An Act for conferring further powers on the Crowhurst Sidley and Bexhill Railway Company and for other purposes.
South Eastern Railway Act 1898	61 & 62 Vict. c. lv	1 July 1898
An Act for conferring farther powers on the South Eastern Railway Company and for other purposes.
Torrington and Okehampton Railway Act 1898	61 & 62 Vict. c. lvi	1 July 1898
An Act to authorise the Torrington and Okehampton Railway Company to deviate their railway to extend the time fur compulsory purchase of lands and completion of works and for other purposes.
Enfield Gas Act 1898	61 & 62 Vict. c. lvii	1 July 1898
An Act to extend the powers of the Enfield Gas Company and amend the Acts affecting that Company and for other purposes.
Milford Docks Act 1898 (repealed)	61 & 62 Vict. c. lviii	1 July 1898
An Act to confer further powers upon the Milford Docks Company and for other purposes. (Repealed by Milford Docks Act 1953 (1 & 2 Eliz. 2. c. x))
Newhaven Harbour and Ouse Lower Navigation Amendment Act 1898	61 & 62 Vict. c. lix	1 July 1898
An Act to amend the Newhaven Harbour and Ouse Lower Navigation Act 1847 (Note: Newhaven Harbour and Ouse Lower Navigation Act 1847 (10 & 11 Vict. c. ix)) and the Newhaven Harbour and Ouse Lower Navigation Improvement Act 1863 (Note: Newhaven Harbour and Ouse Lower Navigation Improvement Act 1863 (26 & 27 Vict. c. clxxxiv)) to authorise the remission or rebate of the Annual Assessments or Scots leviable under the first-mentioned Act to authorise the Trustees of the Newhaven Harbour and Ouse Lower Navigation to contribute towards the maintenance of a certain contemplated Sea Wall and Defences and for other purposes.
City and Brixton Railway Act 1898	61 & 62 Vict. c. lx	1 July 1898
An Act for incorporating the City and Brixton Railway Company and for empowering them to construct an Underground Railway from the City and South London Railway in the Parish of St. Saviour Southwark to Brixton Hill and for other purposes.
Lancashire and Yorkshire Railway Act 1898	61 & 62 Vict. c. lxi	1 July 1898
An Act for conferring further powers on the Lancashire and Yorkshire Railway Company with relation to their own undertaking and upon that Company and the London and North Western Railway Company with relation to the Preston and Wyre Railway and for other purposes.
London, Walthamstow and Epping Forest Railway Act 1898 (repealed)	61 & 62 Vict. c. lxii	1 July 1898
An Act to revive and extend the powers for the purchase of lands and also to extend the time for the completion of the London Walthamstow and Epping Forest Railway and for other purposes. (Repealed by Statute Law (Repeals) Act 2013 (c. 2))
Edmonton Urban District Council Act 1898 (repealed)	61 & 62 Vict. c. lxiii	1 July 1898
An Act to enable the Edmonton Urban District Council to acquire Pymmes Park for a public park and recreation ground for conferring further powers in relation to buildings streets and sanitary matters for making further and better provision for the improvement health and local government of the district and for other purposes. (Repealed by Local Law (North West London Boroughs) Order 1965 (SI 1965/533))
Powell Duffryn Steam Coal Company Act 1898	61 & 62 Vict. c. lxiv	1 July 1898
An Act to provide for the redemption by the Powell Duffryn Steam Coal Company (Limited) of certain Redeemable Shares issued by them and to authorise the creation and issue of new Preference Shares in exchange for the shares redeemed and for other purposes.
Lanarkshire and Dumbartonshire Railway (Capital) Act 1898	61 & 62 Vict. c. lxv	1 July 1898
An Act to authorise the Lanarkshire and Dumbartonshire Railway Company to raise further moneys to enable the Caledonian Railway Company to subscribe for additional shares or stock and for other purposes.
Great Eastern Railway (General Powers) Act 1898	61 & 62 Vict. c. lxvi	1 July 1898
An Act to confer further powers upon and to amend certain Acts relating to the Great Eastern Railway Company to authorise the Company to subscribe towards the undertakings of the Elsenham Thaxted and Bardfield and the Kelvedon Tiptree and Tollesbury Light Railway Companies and to acquire the undertakings of the Ely and Saint Ives the Ely and Newmarket the Colchester Stour Valley Sudbury and Halstead and the Mellis and Eye Railway Companies and part of the Great Northern and Great Extern Joint Railway to make further provision as to certain funds of the Company and for other purposes.
Wirral Railway Act 1898	61 & 62 Vict. c. lxvii	1 July 1898
An Act to authorise the Wirral Railway Company to make an extension railway and other works in the County of Chester and to abandon the railway authorised by the Act of 1895 (Note: Wirral Railway Act 1895 (58 & 59 Vict. c. cxxiv)) and to convert their debenture stocks and for other purposes.
Liverpool and London and Globe Insurance Company Act 1898 (repealed)	61 & 62 Vict. c. lxviii	1 July 1898
An Act for extending and defining the objects of the Liverpool and London and Globe Insurance Company and for other purposes. (Repealed by Liverpool and London and Globe Insurance Company's Act 1904 (4 Edw. 7. c. xxxiv))
Gloucester Gas Act 1898	61 & 62 Vict. c. lxix	1 July 1898
An Act to extend the limits of supply of and confer further powers on the Gloucester Gas Light Company and for other purposes.
Ilkeston Corporation Act 1898	61 & 62 Vict. c. lxx	1 July 1898
An Act to make further provision in regard to the water and gas undertakings of the Mayor Aldermen and Burgesses of the borough of Ilkeston and for other purposes.
Nottingham Corporation Act 1898 (repealed)	61 & 62 Vict. c. lxxi	1 July 1898
An Act to authorise the Corporation of Nottingham to establish a Fire Insurance Fund to make better provision in regard to the driving of carts in the City and for other purposes. (Repealed by Statute Law (Repeals) Act 1995 (c. 44))
Market Harborough Urban District Council Gas Act 1898	61 & 62 Vict. c. lxxii	1 July 1898
An Act to provide for the transfer of the undertaking of the Market Harborough Gas Company Limited to the Market Harborough Urban District Council and to confer further powers on the said Council with respect to the supply of gas and for other purposes.
Sheringham and Beeston Protection Act 1898	61 & 62 Vict. c. lxxiii	1 July 1898
An Act to empower the Erpingham Rural District Council to construct a Sea Wall and other works for the protection of the parishes off Sheringham and Beeston Regis.
Thanet Gas Act 1898	61 & 62 Vict. c. lxxiv	1 July 1898
An Act for conferring further powers on the Isle of Thanet Gaslight and Coke Company.
Land Drainage Supplemental Act 1898 (repealed)	61 & 62 Vict. c. lxxv	25 July 1898
An Act to confirm a Provisional Order under the Land Drainage Act 1861 (Note: Land Drainage Act 1861 (24 & 25 Vict. c. 133)) relating to Hacconby Fen situate in the Parish of Hacconby in the County of Lincoln. (Repealed by Statute Law (Repeals) Act 1993 (c. 50))
	In the matter of Hacconby Fen in the Parish of Hacconby in the County of Lincoln.	
Metropolitan Police Provisional Order Confirmation Act 1898 (repealed)	61 & 62 Vict. c. lxxvi	25 July 1898
An Act to confirm a Provisional Order made by one of Her Majesty's Principal Secretaries of State under the Metropolitan Police Act 1886 (Note: Metropolitan Police Act 1886 (49 & 50 Vict. c. 22)) and the Metropolitan Police Courts Act 1897. (Note: Metropolitan Police Courts Act 1897 (60 & 61 Vict. c. 26)) (Repealed by Statute Law (Repeals) Act 2008 (c. 12))
	Order made by the Secretary of State under the Metropolitan Police Act 1886 and Metropolitan Police Courts Act 1897.	
Local Government Board's Provisional Orders Confirmation (No. 4) Act 1898	61 & 62 Vict. c. lxxvii	25 July 1898
An Act to confirm certain Provisional Orders of the Local Government Board relating to the Abingdon Croydon-and-Wimbledon Newmarket-and-Moulton Royston-Ashwell-and-Melbourn Saffron-Walden and Ulverston Joint Hospital Districts.
	Abingdon Joint Hospital Order 1898 Provisional Order for forming a United District under Section 279 of the Public Health Act 1875. (Note: Public Health Act 1875 (38 & 39 Vict. c. 55))	
	Croydon and Wimbledon Joint Smallpox Hospital Order 1898 Provisional Order for forming a United District under Section 279 of the Public Health Act 1875.	
	Newmarket and Moulton Joint Hospital Order 1898 Provisional Order for forming a United District under Section 279 of the Public Health Act 1875.	
	Royston, Ashwell and Melbourn Joint Hospital Order 1898 Provisional Order for forming a United District under Section 279 of the Public Health Act 1875.	
	Saffron Walden Joint Hospital Order 1898 Provisional Order for forming a United District under Section 279 of the Public Health Act 1875.	
	Ulverston Joint Hospital Order 1898 Provisional Order for forming a United District under Section 279 of the Public Health Act 1875.	
Local Government Board's Provisional Orders Confirmation (No. 5) Act 1898	61 & 62 Vict. c. lxxviii	25 July 1898
An Act to confirm certain Provisional Orders of the Local Government Board relating to Leeds Manchester and Wakefield.
	Leeds Order (No. 1) 1898 Provisional Order to enable the Urban Sanitary Authority for the City of Leeds to put in force the Compulsory Clauses of the Lands Clauses Acts.	
	Manchester Order 1898 Provisional Order to enable the Urban Sanitary Authority for the City of Manchester to put in force the Compulsory Clauses of the Lands Clauses Acts.	
	Wakefield Order 1898 Provisional Order to enable the Urban District Council for the City of Wakefield to put in force the Compulsory Clauses of the Lands Clauses Acts.	
Local Government Board's Provisional Orders Confirmation (No. 6) Act 1898	61 & 62 Vict. c. lxxix	25 July 1898
An Act to confirm certain Provisional Orders of the Local Government Board relating to Blaby (Rural) Bristol Eastbourne Epsom (Rural) Gelligaer-and-Rhigos (Rural) Mailing (Rural) Newport (Mon.) Penmaenmawr Richmond (Surrey) and Rugeley.
	Blaby Rural (Enderby) Order 1898 Provisional Order to enable the Rural District Council of Blaby to put in force the Compulsory Clauses of the Lands Clauses Acts.	
	Bristol Order 1898 Provisional Order to enable the Urban Sanitary Authority for the City of Bristol to put in force the Compulsory Clauses of the Lands Clauses Acts.	
	Eastbourne Order (No. 2) 1898 Provisional Order to enable the Urban District Council for the Borough of Eastbourne to put in force the Compulsory Clauses of the Lands Clauses Acts.	
	Epsom Rural (Ashtead) Order 1898 Provisional Order to enable the Rural District Council of Epsom to put in force the Compulsory Clauses of the Lands Clauses Acts.	
	Gelligaer and Rhigos Rural Order 1898 Provisional Order to enable the Rural District Council of Gelligaer and Rhigos to put in force the Compulsory Clauses of the Lands Clauses Acts.	
	Malling Rural Order 1898 Provisional Order to enable the Rural District Council of Malling to put in force the Compulsory Clauses of the Lands Clauses Acts.	
	Newport (Mon.) Order 1898 Provisional Order to enable the Urban Sanitary Authority for the Borough of Newport (Mon.) to put in force the Compulsory Clauses of the Lands Clauses Acts.	
	Penmaenmawr Order 1898 Provisional Order to enable the Urban District Council of Penmaenmaror to put in force the Compulsory Clauses of the Lands Clauses Acts.	
	Richmond (Surrey) Order 1898 Provisional Order to enable the Urban District Council for the Borough of Richmond (Surrey) to put in force the Compulsory Clauses of the Lands Clauses Acts.	
	Rugeley Order 1898 Provisionat Order to enable the Urban District Council of Rugeley to put in force the Compulsory Clauses of the Lands Clauses Acts.	
Local Government Board's Provisional Orders Confirmation (No. 7) Act 1898	61 & 62 Vict. c. lxxx	25 July 1898
An Act to confirm certain Provisional Orders of the Local Government Board relating to the Counties of Brecon Monmouth and Radnor.
	County of Brecon Order 1898 Provisional Order made in pursuance of sub-section (2) of Section 69 of the Local Government Act 1888. (Note: Local Government Act 1888 (51 & 52 Vict. c. 41))	
	County of Monmouth Order 1898 Provisional Order made in pursuance of sub-section (2) of Section 69 of the Local Government Act 1888.	
	County of Radnor Order 1898 Provisional Order made in pursuance of sub-section (2) of Section 69 of the Local Government Act 1888.	
Local Government Board's Provisional Orders Confirmation (No. 8) Act 1898 (repealed)	61 & 62 Vict. c. lxxxi	25 July 1898
An Act to confirm certain Provisional Orders of the Local Government Board relating to Blackpool Gomersal Nottingham and Sunbury-on-Thames. (Repealed by Statute Law (Repeals) Act 1995 (c. 44))
	Blackpool Order 1898 Provisional Order to enable the Urban District Council for the Borough of Blackpool to put in force the Compulsory Clauses of the Lands Clauses Acts.	
	Gomersal Order 1898 Provisional Order to enable the Urban District Council of Gomersal to put in force the Compulsory Clauses of the Lands Clauses Acts.	
	Nottingham Order 1898 Provisional Order to enable the Urban Sanitary Authority for the City of Nottingham to put in force the Compulsory Clauses of the Lands Clauses Acts.	
	Sunbury-on-Thames Order 1898 Provisional Order to enable the Urban District Council of Sunbury-on-Thames to put in force the Compulsory Clauses of the Lands Clauses Acts.	
Local Government Board's Provisional Orders Confirmation (No. 9) Act 1898	61 & 62 Vict. c. lxxxii	25 July 1898
An Act to confirm certain Provisional Orders of the Local Government Board relating to Brighton-and-Hove Ossett Ripon and Uttoxeter and to the Conway-and-Colwyn Bay and Tolworth United Districts.
	Brighton and Hove (Outfall Sewers) Order 1898 Provisional Order for altering a Local Act (Note: Brighton Intercepting and Outfall Sewers Act 1870 (33 & 34 Vict. c. c)) and a Confirming Act. (Note: Local Government Board's Provisional Orders Confirmation (No. 6) Act 1888 (51 & 52 Vict. c. ci))	
	Ossett Order 1898 Provisional Order for altering a Local Act (Note: Ossett-cum-Gawthorpe Local Board Act 1875 (38 & 39 Vict. c. lxix)) and a Confirming Act. (Note: Local Government Board's Provisional Orders Confirmation (Aberavon, &c.) Act 1880 (43 & 44 Vict. c. lxxxvi))	
	Uttoxeter Order 1898 Provisional Order for altering the City of Ripon Act 1865. (Note: City of Ripon Act 1865 (28 & 29 Vict. c. cxxvi))	
	Conway and Colwyn Bay Joint Water Supply Order 1898 Provisional Order for altering a Local Act. (Note: Uttoxeter Water Act 1892 (55 & 56 Vict. c. clxxxix))	
	Tolworth Joint Hospital Order 1898 Provisional Order for altering Confirming Acts.	
Local Government Board's Provisional Orders Confirmation (No. 11) Act 1898	61 & 62 Vict. c. lxxxiii	25 July 1898
An Act to confirm certain Provisional Orders of the Local Government Board relating to the Borough of Ashton-under-Lyne and the Urban District of Dukinfield and to the City of Chester.
	Ashton under Lyne and Dukinfield Order 1898 Provisional Order made in pursuance of Sections 54 and 59 of the Local Government Act 1888.	
	City of Chester Order 1898 Provisional Order made in pursuance of Sections 54 and 59 of the Local Government Act 1888.	
Local Government Board's Provisional Orders Confirmation (No. 12) Act 1898	61 & 62 Vict. c. lxxxiv	25 July 1898
An Act to confirm certain Provisional Orders of the Local Government Board relating to Dewsbury Haworth Leeds and Stourbridge.
	Dewsbury Order 1898 Provisional Order for partially repealing and altering certain Local Acts.	
	Haworth Order 1898 Provisional Order for partially repealing and altering a Local Act (Note: Haworth Local Board of Health Act 1872 (35 & 36 Vict. c. cvii)) and a Confirming Act. (Note: Local Government Board's Provisional Orders Confirmation (Bethesda, &c.) Act 1880 (43 & 44 Vict. c. clxxviii))	
	Leeds Order (No. 2) 1898 Provisional Order for altering Local Acts and Confirming Acts.	
	Stourbridge Order 1898 Provisional Order to enable the Urban District Council of Stourbridge to put in force the Compulsory Clauses of the Lands Clauses Acts.	
Education Department Provisional Orders Confirmation (Barnes, &c.) Act 1898	61 & 62 Vict. c. lxxxv	25 July 1898
An Act to confirm certain Provisional Orders made by the Education Department under the Elementary Education Acts 1870 to 1893 to enable the School Boards for Barnes Cellan Heston Llanelly and Low Leyton to put in force the Lands Clauses Acts.
	Barnes (Surrey) School Board Order 1898 Provisional Order for putting in force the Lands Clauses Acts.	
	Cellan (Cardiganshire) School Board Order 1898 Provisional Order for putting in force the Lands Clauses Acts.	
	Heston (Middlesex) School Board Order 1898 Provisional Order for putting in force the Lands Clauses Acts.	
	Llanelly (Carmarthenshire) School Board Order 1898 Provisional Order for putting in force the Lands Clauses Acts.	
	Low Leyton (Essex) School Board Order 1898 Provisional Order for putting in force the Lands Clauses Acts.	
Gas Orders Confirmation (No. 1) Act 1898	61 & 62 Vict. c. lxxxvi	25 July 1898
An Act to confirm certain Provisional Orders made by the Board of Trade under the Gas and Water Works Facilities Act 1870 (Note: Gas and Water Works Facilities Act 1870 (33 & 34 Vict. c. 70)) relating to Budleigh Salterton Gas Coatbridge Gas Great Marlow Gas King’s Lynn Gas and Whitchurch (Salop) Gas.
	Budleigh Salterton Gas Order 1898 Order empowering the Budleigh Salterton Gas Company Limited to maintain and continue Gasworks to construct additional Works and to manufacture and supply Gas in the parish of Budleigh Salterton in the county of Devon.	
	Coatbridge Gas Order 1898 Order empowering the Coatbridge Gas Company to raise additional Capital for the purposes of their Undertaking and for other purposes.	
	Great Marlow Gas Order 1898 Order empowering the Great Marlow Gas Company Limited to maintain and continue Gasworks to construct new Gasworks and to manufacture and supply Gas in Great Marlow and the neighbourhood.	
	King's Lynn Gas Order 1898 Order empowering the King's Lynn Gas Company to raise Additional Capital and to construct Additional Works.	
	Whitchurch (Salop) Gas Order 1898 Order empowering the Whitchurch (Salop) Gas Company Limited to maintain and continue Gasworks and to manufacture and supply Gas within the parish of Whitchurch in the county of Shropshire.	
Commons Regulation (Runcorn) Provisional Order Confirmation Act 1898	61 & 62 Vict. c. lxxxvii	25 July 1898
An Act to confirm a Provisional Order under the Inclosure Acts 1845 to 1882 relating to Runcorn Heath and Runcorn Hill in the County of Chester.
	Runcorn Heath and Runcorn Hill Order 1898 Provisional Order for the Regulation of Runcorn Heath and Runcorn Hill.	
Edinburgh Improvement Scheme Provisional Order Confirmation Act 1898	61 & 62 Vict. c. lxxxviii	25 July 1898
An Act to confirm a Provisional Order made by the Secretary for Scotland under Part I. of the Housing of the Working Classes Act 1890 relating to the City and Royal Burgh of Edinburgh.
	Edinburgh Order 1898 Provisional Order for confirming an Improvement Scheme under Part I. of the Housing of the Working Classes Act 1890.	
Military Lands Provisional Orders Confirmation Act 1898 (repealed)	61 & 62 Vict. c. lxxxix	25 July 1898
An Act to confirm certain Provisional Orders of the Secretary of State under the Military Lands Act 1892. (Note: Military Lands Act 1892 (55 & 56 Vict. c. 43)) (Repealed by Statute Law (Repeals) Act 2008 (c. 12))
	Curragh (Rights of Firing and User) Order 1898 A Provisional Order made in pursuance of Section Two of the Military Lands Act 1892 authorising the taking of rights of firing over and other rights of user of a certain part of the Curragh of Kildare.	
	Londonderry (Ebrington) Barracks Enlargement Order 1898 A Provisional Order made in pursuance of Section Two of the Military Lands Act 1892 authorising the taking of certain lands and rights of way for the purpose of the enlargement of the Ebrington Barracks in the City of Londonderry.	
Local Government Board (Ireland) Provisional Orders Confirmation (No. 3) Act 1898	61 & 62 Vict. c. xc	25 July 1898
An Act to confirm certain Provisional Orders of the Local Government Board for Ireland relating to Tralee Coleraine and Skull.
	Tralee Town Gas Provisional Order (No. 1) 1898 Town of Tralee. Provisional Order.	
	Tralee Town Provisional Order (Compulsory Powers) 1898 Provisional Order giving compulsory powers of purchasing lands for a quarry and for waterworks.	
	Coleraine Waterworks Provisional Order 1898 Coleraine Additional Waterworks. Provisional Order.	
	Skull Waterworks Provisional Order 1898 Skull Waterworks. Provisional Order.	
Leith Burgh Order Confirmation Act 1898	61 & 62 Vict. c. xci	25 July 1898
An Act to confirm a Provisional Order made by the Secretary for Scotland relating to an increase in the number of Councillors in the Burgh of Leith.
	Leith Order 1898 Provisional Order.	
Electric Lighting Orders Confirmation (No. 6) Act 1898	61 & 62 Vict. c. xcii	25 July 1898
An Act to confirm certain Provisional Orders made by the Board of Trade under the Electric Lighting Acts 1882 and 1888 relating to Colne East Stonehouse Margam Rochdale St Anne's-on-the-Sea and Weymouth and Melcombe Regis.
	Colne Electric Lighting Order 1898 Provisional Order granted by the Board of Trade under the Electric Lighting Acts 1882 and 1888 to the Mayor Aldermen and Burgesses of the Borough of Colne in respect of the Borough of Colne in the County of Lancaster.	
	East Stonehouse Electric Lighting Order 1898 Provisional Order granted by the Board of Trade under the Electric Lighting Acts 1882 and 1888 to the Urban District Council of East Stonehouse in respect of the Urban District of East Stonehouse in the County of Devon.	
	Margam Electric Lighting Order 1898 Provisional Order granted by the Board of Trade under the Electric Lighting Acts 1882 and 1888 to the Urban District Council of Margam in respect of the Urban District of Margam in the County of Glamorgan.	
	Rochdale Electric Lighting Order 1898 Provisional Order granted by the Board of Trade under the Electric Lighting Acts 1882 and 1888 to the Mayor Aldermen and Burgesses of the County Borough of Rochdale in the County of Lancaster in respect of the County Borough of Rochdale.	
	St. Anne's-on-Sea Electric Lighting Order 1898 Provisional Order granted by the Board of Trade under the Electric Lighting Acts 1882 and 1888 to the Urban District Council of St. Anne's-on-the-Sea in respect of the Urban District of St. Anne's-on-the-Sea in the County of Lancaster.	
	Weymouth and Melcombe Regis Electric Lighting Order 1898 Provisional Order granted by the Board of Trade under the Electric Lighting Acts 1882 and 1888 to the Mayor Aldermen and Burgesses of the Borough of Weymouth and Melcombe Regis in respect of the Borough of Weymouth and Melcombe Regis in the County of Dorset.	
Electric Lighting Orders Confirmation (No. 10) Act 1898	61 & 62 Vict. c. xciii	25 July 1898
An Act to confirm certain Provisional Orders made by the Board of Trade under the Electric Lighting Acts 1882 and 1888 relating to Aston Manor Darlington Lowestoft Oldbury Smethwick and West Bromwich.
	Aston Manor Electric Lighting Order 1898 Provisional Order granted by the Board of Trade under the Electric Lighting Acts 1882 and 1888 to the Aston Manor Urban District Council in respect of the Urban District of Aston Manor in the county of Warwick.	
	Darlington Electric Lighting Order 1898 Provisional Order granted by the Board of Trade for extending the Area within which the Corporation of Darlington may supply Electricity and for amending the Darlington Electric Lighting Order 1890.	
	Lowestoft Electric Lighting Order 1898 Provisional Order granted by the Board of Trade under the Electric Lighting Acts 1882 and 1888 to the Mayor Aldermen and Burgesses of the Borough of Lowestoft in the County of Suffolk in respect of the said Borough.	
	Oldbury Electric Lighting Order 1898 Provisional Order granted by the Board of Trade under the Electric Lighting Acts 1882 and 1888 to the Urban District Council of Oldbury in the County of Worcester in respect of the Urban District of Oldbury.	
	Smethwick Electric Lighting Order 1898 Provisional Order granted by the Board of Trade under the Electric Lighting Acts 1882 and 1888 to the Urban District Council of Smethwick in the County of Stafford in respect of the Urban District of Smethwick.	
	West Bromwich (Corporation) Electric Lighting Order 1898 Provisional Order granted by the Board of Trade under the Electric Lighting Acts 1882 and 1888 to the Mayor Aldermen and Burgesses of the County Borough of West Bromwich in the County of Stafford in respect of the County Borough of West Bromwich.	
Electric Lighting Orders Confirmation (No. 11) Act 1898	61 & 62 Vict. c. xciv	25 July 1898
An Act to confirm certain Provisional Orders made by the Board of Trade under the Electric Lighting Acts 1882 and 1888 relating to Chelmsford Melton Mowbray Norwich (Extension) Preston (Extensions) and Warrington.
	Chelmsford Rural District Electric Lighting Order 1898 Provisional Order granted by the Board of Trade under the Electric Lighting Acts 1882 and 1888 authorising the Chelmsford Electric Lighting Company Limited to supply energy for all public and private purposes within the parishes of Writtle Great Baddow Broomfield Springfield and Widford in the district of the rural district council of Chelmsford in the county of Essex.	
	Melton Mowbray Electric Lighting Order 1898 Provisional Order granted by the Board of Trade under the Electric Lighting Acts 1882 and 1888 to the Melton Mowbray Electric Light Company Limited in respect of the urban district of Melton Mowbray and a portion of the rural district of Melton Mowbray both in the county of Leicester.	
	Norwich (Extension) Electric Lighting Order 1898 Provisional Order granted by the Board of Trade under the Electric Lighting Acts 1882 and 1888 to the Norwich Electricity Company Limited in respect of the parishes of Thorpe Saint Andrew Postwick Sprowston Old Catton Hellesdon Costessey Bowthorpe Colney Cringleford Intwood Keswick Markshall Arminghall Trowse Newton and Bixley and the Shirchall and Castle Ditches Norwich all in the county of Norfolk.	
	Preston (Extensions) Electric Lighting Order 1898 Provisional Order granted by the Board of Trade under the Electric Lighting Acts 1882 and 1888 to the National Electric Supply Company Limited in respect of the whole of the district of the Fulwood Urban District Council and part of the district of the Preston Rural District Council both in the county of Lancaster.	
	Warrington Electric Lighting Order 1898 Provisional Order granted by the Board of Trade under the Electric Lighting Acts 1882 and 1888 to the Mayor Aldermen and Burgesses of the Borough of Warrington in respect of the Borough of Warrington in the County Palatine of Lancaster.	
Electric Lighting Orders Confirmation (No. 14) Act 1898	61 & 62 Vict. c. xcv	25 July 1898
An Act to confirm certain Provisional Orders made by the Board of Trade under the Electric Lighting Acts 1882 and 1888 relating to Bolton (Extension) Kingswinford Penarth Prescot (Extension) and Shrewsbury.
	Bolton (Extension) Electric Lighting Order 1898 Provisional Order granted by the Board of Trade under the Electric Lighting Acts 1882 and 1888 to the Mayor Aldermen and Burgesses of the County Borough of Bolton in the County of Lancaster in respect of places adjacent to the said Borough and to amend the Bolton Electric Lighting Order 1891.	
	Kingswinford Electric Lighting Order 1898 Provisional Order granted by the Board of Trade under the Electric Lighting Acts 1882 and 1888 to the Rural District Council of Kingswinford in the County of Stafford in respect of the Rural District of Kingswinford.	
	Penarth Electric Lighting Order 1898 Provisional Order granted by the Board of Trade under the Electric Lighting Acts 1882 and 1888 to the Penarth Electric Lighting Company Limited in respect of the Urban District of Penarth in the County of Glamorgan.	
	Prescot (Extension) Electric Lighting Order 1898 Provisional Order granted by the Board of Trade under the Electric Lighting Acts 1882 and 1888 to the British Insulated Wire Company Limited in respect of the District of the Huyton-with-Roby Urban District Council in the County of Lancaster and for the purpose of amending the Prescot Electric Lighting Order 1895 with respect to the Undertakers under that Order.	
	Shrewsbury Electric Lighting Order 1898 Provisional Order granted by the Board of Trade under the Electric Lighting Acts 1882 and 1888 to the Mayor Aldermen and Burgesses of the Borough of Shrewsbury in the County of Shropshire in respect of the said Borough.	
Pier and Harbour Orders Confirmation (No. 1) Act 1898	61 & 62 Vict. c. xcvi	25 July 1898
An Act to confirm certain Provisional Orders made by the Board of Trade under the General Pier and Harbour Act 1861 (Note: General Pier and Harbour Act 1861 (24 & 25 Vict. c. 45)) relating to Rothesay Weymouth and Wooda Bay.
	Rothesay Harbour Order 1898 Provisional Order for the extension and improvement of the North Pier and the construction of other Works in the Harbour of Rothesay for amending the Act (Note: Rothesay Harbour and Burgh Offices and Bute County Offices Act 1831 (1 & 2 Will. 4. c. 34)) and Orders relating to the Harbour and for conferring further powers on the Rothesay Harbour Trustees.	
	Weymouth Harbour Order 1898 Order for amending the Weymouth and Melcombe Regis Corporation Act 1887 (Note: Weymouth and Melcombe Regis Corporation Act 1887 (50 & 51 Vict. c. cliii)) and the Weymouth Harbour Order 1893.	
	Wooda Bay Pier Order 1898 Order for the construction maintenance and regulation of an extension of or additions to the pier and works at Wooda Bay in the parish of Martinhoe and county of Devon.	
Local Government Board's Provisional Orders Confirmation (Gas) Act 1898	61 & 62 Vict. c. xcvii	25 July 1898
An Act to confirm certain Provisional Orders of the Local Government Board under the Gas and Water Works Facilities Act 1870 and the Public Health Act 1875 relating to Selby and Wenlock.
	Selby Gas Order 1898 Provisional Order under the Gas and Water Works Facilities Act 1870 and the Gas and Water Works Facilities Act 1870 Amendment Act 1873. (Note: Gas and Water Works Facilities Act 1870 Amendment Act 1873 (36 & 37 Vict. c. 89))	
	Wenlock Gas Order 1898 Provisional Order under the Gas and Water Works Facilities Act 1870.	
Gas Orders Confirmation (No. 2) Act 1898	61 & 62 Vict. c. xcviii	25 July 1898
An Act to confirm certain Provisional Orders made by the Board of Trade under the Gas and Water Works Facilities Act 1870 relating to Cannock Gas Colwall Gas Crossgates Halton and Seacroft Gas and Slough Gas.
	Cannock Gas Order 1898 Order empowering the Cannock Hednesford and District Gas Company Limited to maintain and continue Gasworks and to make and supply Gas within the parish of Cannock the parish of Cheslyn Hay and the parish or township of Great Wyrley all in the county of Stafford.	
	Colwall Gas Order 1898 Order empowering the Colwall Gas Company Limited to maintain and continue Gasworks and to manufacture and supply Gas within the parishes of Colwall and Coddington in the county of Hereford.	
	Crossgates Halton and Seacroft Gas Order 1898 Order empowering the Crossgates Halton and Seacroft Gas Company Limited to maintain and continue Gasworks to manufacture and supply Gas in the Parish of Seacroft the Hamlets of Halton Colton Whitkirk Crossgates Manston Stanks and Scholes in the West Riding of the County of York.	
	Slough Gas Order 1898 Order empowering the Slough Gas and Coke Company to construct and maintain Additional Works for the manufacture and storage of Gas and Residual Products and for other Purposes.	
Local Government Board's Provisional Orders Confirmation (Housing of Working Classes) Act 1898	61 & 62 Vict. c. xcix	25 July 1898
An Act to confirm certain Provisional Orders of the Local Government Board relating to Devonport and Sheffield.
	Devonport (Housing of Working Classes) Order 1898 Provisional Order for confirming an Improvement Scheme under Part I. of the Housing of the Working Classes Act 1890.	
	Sheffield (Housing of Working Classes) Order 1898 Provisional Order under Part I. of the Housing of the Working Classes Act 1890.	
Local Government Board's Provisional Orders Confirmation (Poor Law) Act 1898	61 & 62 Vict. c. c	25 July 1898
An Act to confirm certain Provisional Orders of the Local Government Board relating to the Parish of Lambeth and to the Newhaven and Saint Olave's Unions.
	Lambeth Order 1898 Provisional Order for altering a Confirming Act. (Note: Local Government Board's Provisional Orders Confirmation (Poor Law) (No. 3) Act 1883 (46 & 47 Vict. c. lxxxi))	
	Newhaven Union Order 1898 Provisional Order made in pursuance of sub-section (3) of Section 2 of the Poor Law Act 1889. (Note: Poor Law Act 1889 (52 & 53 Vict. c. 56))	
	Saint Olave's Union Order 1898 Provisional Order made in pursuance of sub-section (3) of Section 2 of the Poor Law Act 1889.	
Tramways Order in Council (Ireland) (Londonderry and Lough Swilly (Letterkenny to Burtonport Extension) Railway) Confirmation Act 1898	61 & 62 Vict. c. ci	25 July 1898
An Act to confirm an Order in Council of the Lord Lieutenant and Privy Council in Ireland relating to the Londonderry and Lough Swilly Railway.
	Londonderry and Lough Swilly (Letterkenny to Burtonport Extension) Railway Order 1898 The Londonderry and Lough Swilly (Letterkenny to Burtonport Extension) Railway Order 1898.	
Aberdeen Corporation (Tramways) Act 1898 (repealed)	61 & 62 Vict. c. cii	25 July 1898
An Act to authorise the Town Council of the City and Royal Burgh of Aberdeen to acquire and the Aberdeen District Tramways Company to sell their undertaking to empower the Town Council to work the undertaking and for other purposes. (Repealed by Aberdeen Corporation (Water, Gas, Electricity and Transport) Order Confirmation Act 1937 (1 Edw. 8 & 1 Geo. 6. c. cii))
South Western Railway Act 1898	61 & 62 Vict. c. ciii	25 July 1898
An Act to confer further powers upon the London and South Western Railway Company to authorise them to execute further works and acquire additional lands and to confer upon the Company and the London Brighton and South Coast Railway Company further powers for the purchase of lands and for other purposes.
Staines Reservoirs Act 1898	61 & 62 Vict. c. civ	25 July 1898
An Act to authorise the Staines Reservoirs Joint Committee to execute further Works to amend in certain respects the Staines Reservoirs &c. Act 1896 (Note: Staines Reservoirs, &c. Act 1896 (59 & 60 Vict. c.ccxli)) and for other purposes.
Belfast Harbour Act 1898	61 & 62 Vict. c. cv	25 July 1898
An Act to enable the Belfast Harbour Commissioners to improve the Victoria Channel and to construct additional docks and works at Belfast to confer further powers upon the Commissioners and for other purposes.
Blackpool Improvement Act 1898 (repealed)	61 & 62 Vict. c. cvi	25 July 1898
An Act to increase the number of the Council of the Borough of Blackpool and to authorise the Mayor Aldermen and Burgesses of the said Borough to construct additional tramways and for other purposes. (Repealed by County of Lancashire Act 1984 (c. xxi))
Sheringham Gas and Water Act 1898	61 & 62 Vict. c. cvii	25 July 1898
An Act to dissolve the Sheringham Gas and Water Company (Limited) and to re-incorporate the Proprietors therein as a new Company for the supply of gas and water in the parishes of Sheringham and Beeston Regis in the county of Norfolk.
Carmarthen Improvement Act 1898	61 & 62 Vict. c. cviii	25 July 1898
An Act to authorise the extension of the Borough of Carmarthen and to make further provision in regard to the water supply of the Borough and for other purposes.
Northam Urban District Water Act 1898	61 & 62 Vict. c. cix	25 July 1898
An Act to authorise the Urban District Council of Northam to construct waterworks for the supply of their District and for other purposes.
North Warwickshire Water Act 1898	61 & 62 Vict. c. cx	25 July 1898
An Act for supplying with water certain Parishes in North Warwickshire.
London, Brighton and South Coast Railway Act 1898	61 & 62 Vict. c. cxi	25 July 1898
An Act to confer further powers on the London Brighton and South Coast Railway Company and for other purposes.
Gainsborough Gas Act 1898 (repealed)	61 & 62 Vict. c. cxii	25 July 1898
An Act for granting further powers to the Gainsborough Gas Company. (Repealed by Gainsborough Urban District Council Gas Act 1899 (62 & 63 Vict. c. lxxiv))
Charing Cross, Euston and Hampstead Railway Act 1898	61 & 62 Vict. c. cxiii	25 July 1898
An Act to confer further powers on the Charing Cross Easton and Hampstead Railway Company for authorising agreements between that Company and the South Eastern and London and North Western Railway Companies and for other purposes.
Southend Waterworks Act 1898 (repealed)	61 & 62 Vict. c. cxiv	25 July 1898
An Act for conferring further powers on the Southend Waterworks Company for the construction of works the raising of money and otherwise in relation to their undertaking and for other purposes. (Repealed by Southend Water Order 1958 (SI 1958/1390))
Southwark and Vauxhall Water Act 1898	61 & 62 Vict. c. cxv	25 July 1898
An Act to authorise the Southwark and Vauxhall Water Company to acquire lands construct additional works take additional water from the River Thames and raise additional capital and for other purposes.
St. Thomas Southwark and St. Saviour Southwark Act 1898	61 & 62 Vict. c. cxvi	25 July 1898
An Act to relieve the Governors of Saint Thomas's Hospital from liability to maintain the Minister and Church of the Parish of Saint Thomas Southwark and to unite the said Parish to the Ecclesiastical Parish of Saint Saviour Southwark and for other purposes.
Yeovil Corporation Act 1898	61 & 62 Vict. c. cxvii	25 July 1898
An Act to enable the Corporation of Yeovil to construct additional Waterworks to purchase the undertaking of the Yeovil Gas and Coke Company Limited to supply gas to establish a station for generating electric power and to raise money by borrowing on mortgage or otherwise.
Bideford and Clovelly Railway Act 1898	61 & 62 Vict. c. cxviii	25 July 1898
An Act for incorporating the Bideford and Clovelly Railway Company and for other purposes.
Ilford Improvement Act 1898	61 & 62 Vict. c. cxix	25 July 1898
An Act to confer further powers upon the Urban District Council for the District of Ilford in the County of Essex.
Great Eastern Railway and Midland and Great Northern Railways Joint Committee Act 1898	61 & 62 Vict. c. cxx	25 July 1898
An Act for confirming and giving effect to certain Heads of Agreement between the Great Eastern Railway Company and the Midland and Great Northern Railways Joint Committee and for other purposes.
Great Eastern Railway (Pensions) Act 1898	61 & 62 Vict. c. cxxi	25 July 1898
An Act to confer further powers upon the Great Eastern Railway Company in relation to payment of pensions and allowances or gratuities to servants on the wages list of the Company and to consolidate with amendments the provisions with regard to the same contained in the Great Eastern Railway (General Powers) Acts 1890 (Note: Great Eastern Railway (General Powers) Act 1890 (53 & 54 Vict. c. cviii)) 1893 (Note: Great Eastern Railway (General Powers) Act 1893 (56 & 57 Vict. c. lii)) 1895 (Note: Great Eastern Railway (General Powers) Act 1895 (58 & 59 Vict. c. xxvi)) and 1896 (Note: Great Eastern Railway (General Powers) Act 1896 (59 & 60 Vict. c. xxiv)) and for other purposes.
Cranbrook District Water Act 1898 (repealed)	61 & 62 Vict. c. cxxii	25 July 1898
An Act to enable the Cranbrook District Water Company to extend their limits of supply construct additional waterworks and for other purposes. (Repealed by Kent Water Act 1955 (4 & 5 Eliz. 2. c. xi))
Crawley and District Water Act 1898 (repealed)	61 & 62 Vict. c. cxxiii	25 July 1898
An Act for incorporating the Crawley and District Water Company and empowering them to construct works and supply water and for other purposes. (Repealed by Cuckfield and Horsham Water Order 1947 (SR&O 1947/585))
East Ham Improvement Act 1898	61 & 62 Vict. c. cxxiv	25 July 1898
An Act to confer further powers upon the Urban District Council for the District of East Ham in the County of Essex.
Wishaw Water (Additional Supply) Act 1898	61 & 62 Vict. c. cxxv	25 July 1898
An Act to authorise the Commissioners of the Burgh of Wishaw to provide an additional water supply to the Burgh and to make and maintain new and additional waterworks and for other purposes.
Liskeard Corporation Act 1898 (repealed)	61 & 62 Vict. c. cxxvi	25 July 1898
An Act for transferring to the Mayor Aldermen and Burgesses of the Borough of Liskeard the undertaking of the Liskeard Waterworks Company and for empowering the Corporation to supply water within the limits of supply of the Company and for other purposes. (Repealed by East Cornwall Water Board Order 1959 (SI 1959/2001))
Norwich Electric Tramways Act 1898	61 & 62 Vict. c. cxxvii	25 July 1898
An Act to authorise the Norwich Electric Tramways Company to construct additional tramways and for other purposes.
Cardiff Corporation Act 1898	61 & 62 Vict. c. cxxviii	25 July 1898
An Act to confirm two agreements made by the Mayor Aldermen and Burgesses of the County Borough of Cardiff for the acquisition and appropriation to public objects of Cathays Park to empower the said Mayor Aldermen and Burgesses to construct new tramways in the said Borough and to work the same and other tramways hereafter acquired by them and for other purposes.
Dundee Corporation (Tramways) Act 1898 (repealed)	61 & 62 Vict. c. cxxix	25 July 1898
An Act to empower the Lord Provost Magistrates and Council of the City and Royal Burgh of Dundee to work and use the tramways within the Burgh and for other purposes. (Repealed by Dundee Corporation (Water, Transport, Finance, &c.) Order Confirmation Act 1954 (2 & 3 Eliz. 2. c. ix))
Buenos Ayres Northern Railway Company Act 1898	61 & 62 Vict. c. cxxx	25 July 1898
An Act to enable the Buenos Ayres Northern Railway Company Limited to sell and the Central Argentine Railway Company Limited to purchase the undertaking of the Buenos Ayres Northern Railway Company Limited and to make provision for the distribution amongst the members of the Buenos Ayres Northern Railway Company Limited of the obligations or other consideration resulting from such sale and for other purposes.
Colonial Bank Act 1898 (repealed)	61 & 62 Vict. c. cxxxi	25 July 1898
An Act to alter and extend the constitution and powers of the Colonial Bank. (Repealed by Colonial Bank Act 1925 (15 & 16 Geo. 5. c. cvi))
Rhondda and Swansea Bay Railway Act 1898	61 & 62 Vict. c. cxxxii	25 July 1898
An Act to extend the time limited for the completion of certain railways authorised to be constructed by the Rhondda and Swansea Bay Railway Company and for other purposes.
Cromer Gas Act 1898	61 & 62 Vict. c. cxxxiii	25 July 1898
An Act for incorporating and conferring powers on the Cromer Gas Company.
Drogheda (Corporation) Gas Act 1898	61 & 62 Vict. c. cxxxiv	25 July 1898
An Act to authorise the transfer of the undertaking of Drogheda Gas Light Company Limited to the Municipal Corporation of the Borough of Drogheda to confer powers on the said Company and Corporation and for other purposes.
Wigan Corporation Act 1898	61 & 62 Vict. c. cxxxv	25 July 1898
An Act to confer further powers upon the Mayor Aldermen and Burgesses of the Borough of Wigan in regard to the construction of tramways and street improvements and other matters and to make further provision in regard to the finance of the borough and for other purposes.
Dover Harbour Act 1898 (repealed)	61 & 62 Vict. c. cxxxvi	25 July 1898
An Act to authorise the abandonment of certain authorised and the construction of certain new works at Dover Harbour the raising of further moneys W the Dover Harbour Board and for other purposes. (Repealed by Dover Harbour Act 1953 (1 & 2 Eliz. 2. c. xxix))
London Building Act 1894 Amendment Act 1898 (repealed)	61 & 62 Vict. c. cxxxvii	25 July 1898
An Act to amend the London Building Act 1894. (Note: London Building Act 1894 (57 & 58 Vict. c. ccxiii)) (Repealed by London Building Act 1930 (20 & 21 Geo. 5. c. clviii))
Crystal Palace Company's Act 1898 (repealed)	61 & 62 Vict. c. cxxxviii	25 July 1898
An Act for making further provisions respecting the capital and undertaking of the Crystal Palace Company and for other purposes. (Repealed by London County Council (Crystal Palace) Act 1951 (14 & 15 Geo. 6. c. xxviii))
Plymouth Corporation Act 1898	61 & 62 Vict. c. cxxxix	25 July 1898
An Act to vest in the Plymouth Corporation the undertaking of the Company of Proprietors for embanking part of the Lairy near Plymouth to empower the Corporation to make new street works and tramway to extend the boundary of the borough and for other purposes.
Turnchapel Quays and Wharves Act 1898	61 & 62 Vict. c. cxl	25 July 1898
An Act to authorise the levy of rates at the Turnchapel Quays and Wharves at Plymouth and to confer various powers on the owners of those quays and wharves.
Stirling Gas Act 1898	61 & 62 Vict. c. cxli	25 July 1898
An Act for incorporating and conferring powers on the Stirling Gas Light Company.
Barry Railway Act 1898	61 & 62 Vict. c. cxlii	25 July 1898
An Act to enable the Barry Railway Company to construct new railways and works and for other purposes.
London County Council (Acton Sewage) Act 1898 (repealed)	61 & 62 Vict. c. cxliii	25 July 1898
An Act to prevent or regulate the discharge of Sewage into the Metropolitan Main Drainage System from the Urban District of Acton in the county of Middlesex. (Repealed by Local Law (Greater London Council and Inner London Boroughs) Order 1965 (SI 1965/540))
Mumbles Railway and Pier Act 1898 (repealed)	61 & 62 Vict. c. cxliv	25 July 1898
An Act to authorise the Mumbles Railway and Pier Company to extend their railway to Black Pill and for other purposes. (Repealed by South Wales Transport Act 1959 (7 & 8 Eliz. 2. c. l))
London, Chatham and Dover Railway Act 1898	61 & 62 Vict. c. cxlv	25 July 1898
An Act to authorise the London Chatham and Dover Railway Company to widen certain bridges to stop up certain level crossings to acquire additional lands to make agreements with the Dover Harbour Board and for other purposes.
Halifax Corporation Act 1898 (repealed)	61 & 62 Vict. c. cxlvi	25 July 1898
An Act to empower the Mayor Aldermen and Burgesses of the County Borough of Halifax to construct additional waterworks tramways street widenings and improvements to confer further powers with respect to their gasworks undertaking to amend some of the provisions of the Local Acts in force within the Borough and for other purposes. (Repealed by West Yorkshire Act 1980 (c. xiv))
Folkestone Water Act 1898	61 & 62 Vict. c. cxlvii	25 July 1898
An Act for the granting of further powers to the Folkestone Waterworks Company.
City of Norwich Waterworks Act 1898 (repealed)	61 & 62 Vict. c. cxlviii	25 July 1898
An Act to confer further powers on the City of Norwich Waterworks Company and for other purposes. (Repealed by Norwich City Council Act 1984 (c. xxiii))
Corporation of Foreign Bondholders Act 1898	61 & 62 Vict. c. cxlix	25 July 1898
An Act to reconstitute the Corporation of Foreign Bondholders.
Blackpool and Fleetwood Tramroad Act 1898	61 & 62 Vict. c. cl	25 July 1898
An Act to empower the Blackpool and Fleetwood Tramroad Company to raise additional capital and for other purposes.
Hamilton Water Act 1898	61 & 62 Vict. c. cli	25 July 1898
An Act for authorising the Hamilton Waterworks Commissioners to make and maintain additional waterworks and for conferring further powers upon those Commissioners and for other purposes.
Hull, Barnsley and West Riding Junction Railway and Dock Act 1898	61 & 62 Vict. c. clii	25 July 1898
An Act to confer further powers upon the Hull Barnsley and West Riding Junction Railway and Dock Company and to authorise the transfer of the undertaking of the Hull and South Yorkshire Extension Bail way Company to the Company and for other purposes.
Kettering Water Act 1898	61 & 62 Vict. c. cliii	25 July 1898
An Act to authorise the Urban District Council of Kettering to purchase the undertaking of the Kettering Waterworks Company and for other purposes.
Clergy Mutual Assurance Society Act 1898 (repealed)	61 & 62 Vict. c. cliv	25 July 1898
An Act to confirm and provide for future alterations of the rules and regulations of the Clergy Mutual Assurance Society. (Repealed by Clergy Mutual Assurance Society Act 1914 (4 & 5 Geo. 5. c. clxx))
Kew Bridge Act 1898 (repealed)	61 & 62 Vict. c. clv	25 July 1898
An Act to empower the County Councils of the Administrative Counties of Middlesex and Surrey to rebuild Kew Bridge and to make new approaches thereto and to execute other works in connexion therewith and for other purposes. (Repealed by Middlesex County Council Act 1944 (7 & 8 Geo. 6. c. xxi))
Bacup Corporation Water Act 1898	61 & 62 Vict. c. clvi	25 July 1898
An Act to empower the Mayor Aldermen and Burgesses of the borough of Bacup to construct additional waterworks and for other purposes.
Higham and Hundred of Hoo Water (Amendment) Act 1898 (repealed)	61 & 62 Vict. c. clvii	25 July 1898
An Act to confer further powers on the Higham and Hundred of Hoo Water Company. (Repealed by Kent Water Act 1955 (4 & 5 Eliz. 2. c. xi))
Dublin Southern District Tramways Act 1898	61 & 62 Vict. c. clviii	25 July 1898
An Act to amend the provisions of the Dublin Southern District Tramways Act 1893 (Note: Dublin Southern District Tramways Act 1893 (56 & 57 Vict. c. ccxx)) relating to the speed at which engines carriages and trucks may be driven or propelled on the tramways of the Dublin Southern District Tramways Company and for other purposes.
Glasgow and South Western Railway Act 1898	61 & 62 Vict. c. clix	25 July 1898
An Act for conferring further powers on the Glasgow and South Western Railway Company for the construction of works and the acquisition of lands and for other purposes.
Matlock Urban District Council Act 1898 (repealed)	61 & 62 Vict. c. clx	25 July 1898
An Act for authorising the Matlock Urban District Council to acquire the water undertaking of the Matlock Waterworks Company Limited and to construct waterworks and for making further and better provision for the local government of the District and for other purposes. (Repealed by Matlocks Urban District Council Act 1927 (17 & 18 Geo. 5. c. xvii))
Tottenham and Edmonton Gas Act 1898	61 & 62 Vict. c. clxi	25 July 1898
An Act to make further provisions as to the Capital of the Tottenham and Edmonton Gas light and Coke Company and for other purposes.
Felixstowe and Walton Water Act 1898	61 & 62 Vict. c. clxii	25 July 1898
An Act to authorise the Urban District Council of Felixstowe and Walton to purchase the undertaking of the Felixstowe and Walton Waterworks Company and for other purposes.
Midland Railway (West Riding Lines) Act 1898	61 & 62 Vict. c. clxiii	25 July 1898
An Act to confer powers upon the Midland Railway Company for the construction of railways from Royston to Bradford in the West Riding of the County of York and for other purposes.
Newtown Water Act 1898	61 & 62 Vict. c. clxiv	25 July 1898
An Act to authorise the Urban District Council of Newtown and Llanllwchaiarn to purchase the undertaking of the Newtown Waterworks Company and for other purposes.
Great Northern Railway Act 1898	61 & 62 Vict. c. clxv	25 July 1898
An Act to confer further powers upon the Great Northern Railway Company with respect to their own undertaking and undertakings in which they are jointly interested and for other purposes.
Blackburn Corporation (Tramways, &c.) Act 1898	61 & 62 Vict. c. clxvi	25 July 1898
An Act to authorise the Corporation of the County Borough of Blackburn to acquire the undertaking of the Blackburn Corporation Tramways Company Limited to con¬ struct new tramways in the Borough to improve and work the undertaking to partially consolidate the redeemable debt and mortgages of the Corporation to consolidate and apply sinking funds to repeal borrowing powers to borrow money and for other purposes.
Bristol Tramways (Electrical Power, &c.) Act 1898	61 & 62 Vict. c. clxvii	25 July 1898
An Act to authorise the use of Electrical power on the Tramways of the Bristol Tramways and Carriage Company Limited and for other purposes.
Bristol Tramways (Extensions) Act 1898	61 & 62 Vict. c. clxviii	25 July 1898
An Act to authorise the Bristol Tramways and Carriage Company Limited to extend their Tramways and to confer further powers upon that Company.
Neath, Pontardawe and Brynaman Railway Act 1898	61 & 62 Vict. c. clxix	25 July 1898
An Act to authorise the Neath Pontardawe and Brynaman Railway Company to construct additional railways in the County of Glamorgan to extend the times for the taking of lands for and for the completion of their authorised railways and for other purposes.
Plymouth and Stonehouse Gas Act 1898	61 & 62 Vict. c. clxx	25 July 1898
An Act to confer further powers on the Plymouth and Stonehouse Gas Light and Coke Company and for other purposes.
Newhaven and Seaford Sea Defences Act 1898 (repealed)	61 & 62 Vict. c. clxxi	25 July 1898
An Act to authorise and provide for the construction of certain Sea Defence Works between Newhaven and Seaford in the County of Sussex and to enable the Newhaven Harbour Company to raise additional capital and the London Brighton and South Coast Railway Company to guarantee dividend thereon and for other purposes. (Repealed by Southern Water Authority Act 1980 (c. xxxviii))
Gas Light and Coke Company (Capital Consolidation) Act 1898	61 & 62 Vict. c. clxxii	2 August 1898
An Act to consolidate and convert the capital of the Gas Light and Coke Company and for other purposes.
Coventry Corporation Gas Act 1898	61 & 62 Vict. c. clxxiii	2 August 1898
An Act to confer further powers upon the Mayor Aldermen and Citizens of the City of Coventry in regard to their gas undertaking and for other purposes.
Great Western Railway (General Powers) Act 1898	61 & 62 Vict. c. clxxiv	2 August 1898
An Act for conferring further powers upon the Great Western Railway Company in respect of their own undertaking and upon that Company and the London and North Western Railway Company and the Midland Railway Company in respect of undertaking in which they are jointly interested for amalgamating the Helston and Leominster and Kington Railway Companies with the Great Western Railway Company and for other purposes.
Leyton Urban District Council Act 1898	61 & 62 Vict. c. clxxv	2 August 1898
An Act to empower the Leyton Urban District Council to work tramways for the time being owned by them within their district to make further and better provision for the good government and improvement of the district and for other purposes.
London, Tilbury and Southend Railway Act 1898	61 & 62 Vict. c. clxxvi	2 August 1898
An Act to enable the London Tilbury and Southend Railway Company to construct works and purchase additional lands for the improvement of their undertaking to subscribe towards the undertaking of the Whitechapel and Bow Railway Company or to guarantee interest on the capital of that Company and to make other provisions with respect to the use by the Tilbury Company of the London and Blackwall Railway and Stations thereon and for other purposes.
Metropolitan Railway Act 1898	61 & 62 Vict. c. clxxvii	2 August 1898
An Act for conferring further powers upon the Metropolitan Railway Company in relation to their own undertaking and for the ventilation of their railway and upon that Company and the Metropolitan District Railway Company in relation to the working of their undertakings by electrical power and upon those Companies and the South Eastern Railway Company with respect to certain lands at Cannon Street and for other purposes.
Middlesbrough Corporation (Gas) Act 1898 (repealed)	61 & 62 Vict. c. clxxviii	2 August 1898
An Act to confer further powers upon the Mayor Aldermen and Burgesses of the Borough of Middlesbrough in relation to the Supply of Gas. (Repealed by Middlesbrough Corporation Act 1933 (23 & 24 Geo. 5. c. lxxxiii))
Tynemouth Corporation (Water) Act 1898	61 & 62 Vict. c. clxxix	2 August 1898
An Act to empower the Corporation of Tynemouth to obtain water from the River Font in the County of Northumberland for the supply of the Borough of Tynemouth and adjacent places and for other purposes.
Dublin Port and Docks Act 1898	61 & 62 Vict. c. clxxx	2 August 1898
An Act to alter the constitution of the Dublin Port and Docks Board to confer further powers on that Board with respect to the creation and issue of stock and the borrowing of money and for other purposes.
Easton and Church Hope Railway (Extension of Time) Act 1898	61 & 62 Vict. c. clxxxi	2 August 1898
An Act to extend the time for the completion of the authorised railways of the Easton and Church Hope Railway Company and for other purposes.
Clontarf and Hill of Howth Tramroad Act 1898	61 & 62 Vict. c. clxxxii	2 August 1898
An Act for making a tramroad in the County of Dublin and for other purposes.
London and North Western Railway (Wales) Act 1898	61 & 62 Vict. c. clxxxiii	2 August 1898
An Act for conferring further powers upon the London and North Western Railway Company in relation to their Chester and Holyhead Railway and for other purposes.
St. David's Railway Act 1898	61 & 62 Vict. c. clxxxiv	2 August 1898
An Act to authorise the construction of a railway from Jordanston to St. David's and for other purposes.
Clacton Gas and Water Act 1898	61 & 62 Vict. c. clxxxv	2 August 1898
An Act for incorporating and conferring powers on the Clacton Gas and Water Company and to authorise the acquisition by the Clacton Urban District Council of the undertaking of that Company and for other purposes.
Maldon Water Act 1898	61 & 62 Vict. c. clxxxvi	2 August 1898
An Act to confer powers on the Maldon Water Supply Company Limited and to authorise the transfer of their undertaking to the Corporation of Maldon and for other purposes.
Southampton Gas Act 1898	61 & 62 Vict. c. clxxxvii	2 August 1898
An Act to extend the limits of supply of the Southampton Gaslight and Coke Company and to confer on them further powers for the acquisition of lands the raising of additional capital and for other purposes.
Caledonian Railway Act 1898	61 & 62 Vict. c. clxxxviii	2 August 1898
An Act to confer further powers on the Caledonian Railway Company in relation to their undertaking to revive the powers and extend the time for the purchase of lands for and for the construction and completion of certain railways to provide for the acquisition by the Company of the Crieff and Comrie Railway and for other purposes.
Leicester Freemen's Act 1898	61 & 62 Vict. c. clxxxix	2 August 1898
An Act to reconstitute the Deputies of the Resident "Freemen and Freemen's Widows of the Borough of Leicester" and to amend the Act (Note: Leicester Freemen's Act 1845 (8 & 9 Vict. c. 6 Pr.)) passed in the eighth and ninth years of the reign of Her Majesty Queen Victoria constituting such Deputies.
Paisley Corporation (Loans) Act 1898	61 & 62 Vict. c. cxc	2 August 1898
An Act to authorise the Provost Magistrates and Town Council of the Burgh of Paisley to create and issue stock to borrow money in respect of the redemption of Paisley Burgh Annuities the improvement of the Burgh Slaughter House and redemption of annuity and discharge of debts affecting the same and for other purposes.
St. Marylebone Church Rate Abolition Act 1898	61 & 62 Vict. c. cxci	2 August 1898
An Act for the abolition of the Church Rate leviable in the Parish of Saint Marylebone in the County of London and for securing otherwise the maintenance of the fabrics of certain Churches and Chapels in the Parish and the stipends of the Incumbents of such Churches and for other purposes.
Burnley Corporation (Tramways, &c.) Act 1898	61 & 62 Vict. c. cxcii	2 August 1898
An Act to confer further powers upon the Corporation of the County Borough of Burnley with respect to Tramways and to their Electric Lighting and other undertakings to make further provision for the improvement and good government of the Borough to amend and extend the provisions of the Local Acts relating to the Borough and for other purposes.
Ipswich Dock Act 1898	61 & 62 Vict. c. cxciii	2 August 1898
An Act to enable the Ipswich Dock Commissioners to make certain works in connexion with their dock and to confer various further powers upon the Commissioners and for other purposes.
Usk Valley Railway Act 1898	61 & 62 Vict. c. cxciv	2 August 1898
An Act for incorporating the Usk Valley Railway Company and authorising them to construct a railway in the Counties of Monmouth and Brecon and for other purposes.
Manchester Carriage and Tramways Company Act 1898	61 & 62 Vict. c. cxcv	2 August 1898
An Act to enable the Manchester Carriage and Tramways Company to provide for the consolidation of their share Capitol and for other purposes.
Birmingham North Warwickshire and Stratford-upon-Avon Railway Act 1898	61 & 62 Vict. c. cxcvi	2 August 1898
An Act to extend the time for the compulsory purchase of lands for and for the completion of certain portions of the Birmingham North Warwickshire and Stratford-upon-Avon Railway and for other purposes.
North Eastern Railway Act 1898	61 & 62 Vict. c. cxcvii	2 August 1898
An Act to confer additional powers upon the North Eastern Railway Company for the construction of new railways and other works and the acquisition of additional lands and for amalgamating the Scarborough and Whitby Railway Company with the Company and for other purposes.
Isle of Wight Railway (Brading Harbour and Railway) Act 1898	61 & 62 Vict. c. cxcviii	2 August 1898
An Act for vesting in the Isle of Wight Railway Company the undertaking of the Brading Harbour and Railway Company and for other purposes.
Electric Lighting Orders Confirmation (No. 9) Act 1898 (repealed)	61 & 62 Vict. c. cxcix	2 August 1898
An Act to confirm certain Provisional Orders made by the Board of Trade under the Electric Lighting Acts 1882 to 1890 relating to Montrose and Perth. (Repealed by North of Scotland Electricity Order Confirmation Act 1958 (7 & 8 Eliz. 2. c. ii))
	Montrose Electric Lighting Order 1898 Provisional Order granted by the Board of Trade under the Electric Lighting Acts 1882 to 1890 to the Provost and Councillors of the Royal Burgh of Montrose in the County of Forfar in respect of the Royal Burgh of Montrose.	
	Perth Electric Lighting Order 1898 Provisional Order granted by the Board of Trade under the Electric Lighting Acts 1882 to 1890 to the Commissioners of the Burgh of Perth in respect of that Burgh.	
Electric Lighting Orders Confirmation (No. 13) Act 1898	61 & 62 Vict. c. cc	2 August 1898
An Act to confirm certain Provisional Orders made by the Board of Trade under the Electric Lighting Acts 1882 and 1888 relating to Holborn and St. Giles.
	Holborn and St. Giles' Electric Lighting Order 1898 (No. 1) Provisional Order granted by the Board of Trade under the Electric Lighting Acts 1882 and 1888 to the County of London and Brush Provincial Electric Lighting Company Limited in respect of portion of the District of the Holborn District Board of Works the District of the St. Giles' Board of Works and the extra-parochial places of Lincoln's Inn Gray's Inn Staple Inn and Furnival's Inn all in the County of London.	
	Holborn and St. Giles' Electric Lighting Order 1898 (No. 2) Provisional Order granted by the Board of Trade under the Electric Lighting Acts 1882 and 1888 to the Charing Cross and Strand Electricity Supply Corporation Limited in respect of part of the District of the Holborn District Board of Works and part of the District of the St. Giles District Board of Works both in the County of London.	
Pier and Harbour Orders Confirmation (No. 2) Act 1898	61 & 62 Vict. c. cci	2 August 1898
An Act to confirm certain Provisional Orders made by the Board of Trade under the General Pier and Harbour Act 1861 relating to Colwyn Bay Macduff Medina River Portsmouth Camber Quays and Southwold.
	Colwyn Bay Victoria Pier Order 1898 Order for the Construction and Maintenance of a Pier and Works at Colwyn Bay in the County of Denbigh.	
	Macduff Harbour Order 1898 Order for empowering the Provost Magistrates and Town Council of the Burgh of Macduff to purchase the Harbour of Macduff in the county of Banff and for empowering them to construct New Works at and for the maintenance and regulation of the Harbour.	
	River Medina Navigation Order 1898 Order for amending the River Medina Navigation Act 1852 (Note: River Medina Navigation Act 1852 (15 & 16 Vict. c. xxi)) and for other purposes connected with the River Medina Navigation.	
	Portsmouth Camber Quays Order 1898 Order for the Construction of Works in the Camber and for conferring further powers upon the Mayor Aldermen and Burgesses of the Borough of Portsmouth in relation thereto.	
	Southwold Harbour Order 1898 Order to transfer to and vest in the Mayor Aldermen and Burgesses of the Borough of Southwold in the County of Suffolk the Undertaking of the Commissioners of the Harbour of Southwold to dissolve those Commissioners and for the improvement maintenance and regulation of the Harbour.	
Tramways Orders Confirmation (No. 2) Act 1898	61 & 62 Vict. c. ccii	2 August 1898
An Act to confirm certain Provisional Orders made by the Board of Trade under the Tramways Act 1870 (Note: Tramways Act 1870 (33 & 34 Vict. c. 78)) relating to Blast Ham Urban District Tramways Eccleshill Urban District Tramways Huddersfield Corporation Tramways and Linthwaite Tramway.
	East Ham Urban Council Tramways Order 1898 Order authorising the Urban District Council of East Ham to construct Tramways in their District and for other purposes.	
	Eccleshill Urban Council Tramways Order 1898 Order authorising the Urban District Council of Eccleshill to construct Tramways in their District and for other purposes.	
	Huddersfield Corporation Tramways Order 1898 Order authorising the Mayor Aldermen and Burgesses of the County Borough of Huddersfield to construct additional Tramways in the said Borough.	
	Linthwaite Tramway Order 1898 Order authorising the Council for the Urban District of Linthwaite in the West Riding of the County of York to construct a Tramway in the said Urban District.	
Water Orders Confirmation Act 1898	61 & 62 Vict. c. cciii	2 August 1898
An Act to confirm certain Provisional Orders made by the Board of Trade under the Gas and Water Works Facilities Act 1870 relating to Broughton-in-Furness Water Hayling Water Portsmouth Water Ross Water Saint Neot's Water and Wrexham Water.
	Broughton-in-Furness Water Order 1898 Order empowering the Broughton-in-Furness Water Company Limited to construct and maintain Waterworks and to supply Water within the town of Broughton-in-Furness and the hamlets of Sykehouse and Kepplewray in the township of Broughton West in the county of Lancaster.	
	Hayling Water Order 1898 Order empowering the South Hayling Water Company Limited to construct additional Waterworks and to extend their limits of supply.	
	Borough of Portsmouth Water Order 1898 Order empowering the Borough of Portsmouth Waterworks Company to raise additional Capital and for other purposes.	
	Ross Water Order 1898 Order empowering the Undertakers of the Ross Waterworks to raise additional Capital.	
	Wrexham Waterworks Order 1898 Order empowering the St. Neot's Water Company to construct and maintain Waterworks.	
Education Department Provisional Order Confirmation (London) Act 1898	61 & 62 Vict. c. cciv	12 August 1898
An Act to confirm a Provisional Order made by the Education Department under the Elementary Education Acts 1870 to 1893 to enable the School Board for London to put in force the Lands Clauses Acts.
	London School Board Order 1898 Provisional Order for putting in force the Lands Clauses Acts.	
Electric Lighting Orders Confirmation (No. 5) Act 1898	61 & 62 Vict. c. ccv	12 August 1898
An Act to confirm certain Provisional Orders made by the Board of Trade under the Electric Lighting Acts 1882 and 1888 relating to Aldershot Bridgwater Chislehurst Gravesend and Hastings.
	Aldershot Electric Lighting Order 1898 Provisional Order granted by the Board of Trade under the Electric Lighting Acts 1882 and 1888 to the Urban District Council of Aldershot in respect of the Urban District of Aldershot in the County of Southampton.	
	Bridgwater Electric Lighting Order 1898 Provisional Order granted by the Board of Trade under the Electric Lighting Acts 1882 and 1888 to the Mayor Aldermen and Burgesses of the Borough of Bridgwater in the County of Somerset in respect of the said Borough.	
	Chislehurst Electric Lighting Order 1898 Provisional Order granted by the Board of Trade under the Electric Lighting Acts 1882 and 1888 to the Chislehurst Electric Supply Company Limited in respect of part of the Parish of Chislehurst in the County of Kent.	
	Gravesend Electric Lighting Order 1898 Provisional Order granted by the Board of Trade under the Electric Lighting Acts 1882 and 1888 to the Mayor Aldermen and Burgesses of the Borough of Gravesend in the County of Kent in respect of the said Borough of Gravesend.	
	Hastings Corporation Electric Lighting Order 1898 Provisional Order granted by the Board of Trade under the Electric Lighting Acts 1882 and 1888 applied for by the Mayor Aldermen and Burgesses of the Borough of Hastings in the County of Sussex in respect of the Borough of Hastings.	
Electric Lighting Orders Confirmation (No. 7) Act 1898	61 & 62 Vict. c. ccvi	12 August 1898
An Act to confirm certain Provisional Orders made by the Board of Trade under the Electric Lighting Acts 1882 and 1888 relating to Middlesbrough Nuneaton St Alban Whiston and Willesden.
	Middlesbrough Corporation Electric Lighting Order 1898 Provisional Order granted by the Board of Trade under the Electric Lighting Acts 1882 and 1888 to the Mayor Aldermen and Burgesses of the Borough of Middlesbrough in respect of the Borough of Middlesbrough in the North Riding of York.	
	Nuneaton Electric Lighting Order 1898 Provisional Order granted by the Board of Trade under the Electric Lighting Acts 1882 and 1888 to the Nuneaton Electric Company Limited in respect of the Parishes of Nuneaton and Chilvers Coton in the County of Warwick.	
	St. Albans Electric Lighting Order 1898 Provisional Order granted by the Board of Trade under the Electric Lighting Acts 1882 and 1888 to the Mayor Aldermen and Citizens of the City of St. Alban in the County of Hertford in respect of the said City.	
	Whiston Rural District Electric Lighting Order 1898 Provisional Order granted by the Board of Trade under the Electric Lighting Acts 1882 and 1888 to the Whiston Rural District Council in respect of the Rural District of Whiston in the County of Lancaster.	
	Willesden Electric Lighting Order 1898 Provisional Order granted by the Board of Trade under the Electric Lighting Acts 1882 and 1888 to the Willesden Urban District Council in respect of the Urban District of Willesden in the County of Middlesex.	
Electric Lighting Orders Confirmation (No. 8) Act 1898	61 & 62 Vict. c. ccvii	12 August 1898
An Act to confirm certain Provisional Orders made by the Board of Trade under the Electric Lighting Acts 1882 and 1888 relating to Birkdale Burslem Chorley Crewe Maidenhead and Stoke-upon-Trent.
	Birkdale Electric Lighting Order 1898 Provisional Order granted by the Board of Trade under the Electric Lighting Acts 1882 and 1888 to the Birkdale Urban District Council in respect of the Urban District of Birkdale in the County of Lancaster.	
	Burslem Electric Lighting Order 1898 Provisional Order granted by the Board of Trade under the Electric Lighting Acts 1882 and 1888 to the Mayor Aldermen and Burgesses of the Borough of Burslem in the county of Stafford in respect of the said Borough.	
	Chorley Electric Lighting Order 1898 Provisional Order granted by the Board of Trade under the Electric Lighting Acts 1882 and 1888 to the Mayor Aldermen and Burgesses of the Borough of Chorley in respect of the Borough of Chorley in the County of Lancaster.	
	Crewe Electric Lighting Order 1898 Provisional Order granted by the Board of Trade under the Electric Lighting Acts 1882 and 1888 to the Mayor Aldermen and Burgesses of the Borough of Crewe in the County of Chester in respect of the said Borough.	
	Maidenhead Electric Lighting Order 1898 Provisional Order granted by the Board of Trade under the Electric Lighting Acts 1882 and 1888 to the Mayor Aldermen and Burgesses of the borough of Maidenhead in the county of Berks in respect of the said borough.	
	Stoke-upon-Trent Electric Lighting Order 1898 Provisional Order granted by the Board of Trade under the Electric Lighting Acts 1882 and 1888 to the Mayor Aldermen and Burgesses of the Borough of Stoke-upon-Trent in the County of Stafförd in respect of the said borough.	
Electric Lighting Order Confirmation (No. 15) Act 1898	61 & 62 Vict. c. ccviii	12 August 1898
An Act to confirm a Provisional Order granted by the Board of Trade under the Electric Lighting Acts 1882 and 1888 to the Midland Electric Corporation for Power Distribution (Limited) in respect of an area situate in the County of Stafford.
	Midland Electric Power Distribution and Lighting Order 1898 Provisional Order granted by the Board of Trade under the Electric Lighting Acts 1882 and 1888 to the Midland Electric Corporation for Power Distribution (Limited) in respect of an area situate in the County of Stafford.	
Tramways Orders Confirmation (No. 1) Act 1898	61 & 62 Vict. c. ccix	12 August 1898
An Act to confirm certain Provisional Orders made by the Board of Trade under the Tramways Act 1870 relating to Blackpool St. Anne's and Lytham Tramways Great Crosby Tramways Liverpool Corporation Tramways (Extensions) and Waterloo-with-Seaforth Tramways.
	Blackpool, St. Anne's and Lytham Tramways Company's Order 1898 Order authorising the Blackpool Saint Anne's and Lytham Tramways Company to construct a Tramway.	
	Great Crosby Tramways Order 1898 Order authorising the Urban District Council of Great Crosby to construct Tramways in their District.	
	Liverpool Corporation Tramways (Extensions) Order 1898 Order authorising the Mayor Aldermen and Citizens of the City of Liverpool to construct additional Tramways in the said City.	
	Waterloo-with-Seaforth Tramways Order 1898 Order authorising the Urban District Council of Waterloo-with-Seaforth to construct Tramways in their District.	
Tramways Orders Confirmation (No. 3) Act 1898	61 & 62 Vict. c. ccx	12 August 1898
An Act to confirm certain Provisional Orders made by the Board of Trade under the Tramways Act 1870 relating to Carlisle Tramways Hartlepool Tramways and City of Oxford and District Tramways.
	Carlisle Tramways Order 1898 Order authorising the construction of Street Tramways in and near the City of Carlisle.	
	West Hartlepool Tramways Order 1898 Order authorising the General Electric Tramways Company Limited to construct additional Tramways in the Borough of West Hartlepool in the County of Durham and for other purposes.	
	Oxford Tramways (Extension) Order 1898 Order authorising the City of Oxford and District Tramways Company Limited to construct a new Tramway.	
Local Government Board's Provisional Order Confirmation (No. 10) Act 1898	61 & 62 Vict. c. ccxi	12 August 1898
An Act to confirm a Provisional Order of the Local Government Board relating to the Borough of Devonport.
	Devonport (Extension) Order 1898 Provisional Order made in pursuance of Sections 54 and 59 of the Local Government Act 1888.	
Local Government Board's Provisional Orders Confirmation (No. 13) Act 1898	61 & 62 Vict. c. ccxii	12 August 1898
An Act to confirm certain Provisional Orders of the Local Government Board relating to Cheltenham (two) Fulwood Salford and Worthing and to the Hanley Stoke and Fenton Joint Hospital District.
	Cheltenham Order (No. 1) 1898 Provisional Order for altering the Cheltenham Corporation Water Act 1881. (Note: Cheltenham Corporation Water Act 1881 (44 & 45 Vict. c. lxxiv))	
	Cheltenham Order (No. 2) 1898 Provisional Order for altering a Local Act (Note: Cheltenham Improvement Act 1889 (52 & 53 Vict. c. clxxxiv)) and a Confirming Act. (Note: Local Government Board's Provisional Orders Confirmation (No. 12) Act 1892 (55 & 56 Vict. c. ccxxiii))	
	Fulwood Order 1898 Provisional Order for altering the Fulwood Local Board Act 1885. (Note: Fulwood Local Board Act 1885 (48 & 49 Vict. c. xxxv))	
	Salford Order 1898 Provisional Order for altering certain Local Acts.	
	Worthing Order 1898 Provisional Order for altering a Local Act (Note: Worthing Improvement Act 1821 (1 & 2 Geo. 4. c. lix)) and Confirming Acts.	
	Hanley, Stoke and Fenton Joint Hospital Order 1898 Provisional Order for altering a Confirming Act. (Note: Local Government Board's Provisional Orders Confirmation (Abergavenny, &c.) Act 1880 (43 & 44 Vict. c. lviii))	
Metropolitan Commons (East Sheen) Supplemental Act 1898	61 & 62 Vict. c. ccxiii	12 August 1898
An Act to confirm a Scheme relating to East Sheen Common in the Parish of Mortlake Surrey.
	East Sheen Common Order 1898 Scheme with respect to East Sheen Common.	
Military Lands Provisional Orders Confirmation (No. 2) Act 1898 (repealed)	61 & 62 Vict. c. ccxiv	12 August 1898
An Act to confirm certain Provisional Orders of the Secretary of State under the Military Lands Act 1892. (Repealed by Statute Law (Repeals) Act 2008 (c. 12))
	Woking Barracks Order 1898 A Provisional Order made in pursuance of Section Two of the Military Lands Act 1892 authorising the taking of certain lands for the purpose of the building and enlarging of Barracks at or near Woking in the County of Surrey.	
India Office (Store Depôt) Act 1898	61 & 62 Vict. c. ccxv	12 August 1898
An Act to empower the Secretary of State in Council to purchase Lands in connexion with the Store Department of the India Office.
Buckie (Cluny) Harbour Act 1898 (repealed)	61 & 62 Vict. c. ccxvi	12 August 1898
An Act to authorise the Trustees of the late John Gordon of Cluny to construct additional Works at the Harbour of Buckie in the Parish of Rathven and County of Banff and to enable the Commissioners of the Burgh of Buckie to grant guarantees in connexion with the revenue of the Harbour and for other purposes. (Repealed by Grampian Regional Council (Harbours) Order Confirmation Act 1987 (c. x))
Great North of Scotland Railway Act 1898	61 & 62 Vict. c. ccxvii	12 August 1898
An Act to authorise the Great North of Scotland Railway Company to widen alter and improve parts of their railway to buy additional land and for other purposes.
Newhaven and Seaford Water Act 1898 (repealed)	61 & 62 Vict. c. ccxviii	12 August 1898
An Act to incorporate and confer powers on the Newhaven and Seaford Water Company, (Repealed by Mid-Sussex Water Order 1985 (SI 1985/513))
Exeter Railway Act 1898	61 & 62 Vict. c. ccxix	12 August 1898
An Act to authorise the Exeter Teign Valley and Chagford Railway Company to construct Deviation Railways to revive the powers and further extend the time limited for the completion of their authorised railway and for other purposes.
Sheffield Electric Lighting (Transfer) Act 1898 (repealed)	61 & 62 Vict. c. ccxx	12 August 1898
An Act to confirm an agreement for the purchase of the undertaking of the Sheffield Electric Light and Power Company by the Corporation of Sheffield and to confer borrowing powers and other powers on the said Corporation. (Repealed by Sheffield Corporation (Consolidation) Act 1918 (8 & 9 Geo. 5. c. lxi))
London County Council (General Powers) Act 1898	61 & 62 Vict. c. ccxxi	12 August 1898
An Act to empower the London County Council to make certain street improvements to purchase lands to make provision for contributions in certain cases by Local Authorities to remove obstructions in certain streets to make various miscellaneous provisions relating to the London County Council and for other purposes.
London County Council (Money) Act 1898 (repealed)	61 & 62 Vict. c. ccxxii	12 August 1898
An Act to regulate the expenditure of money by the London County Council on Capital Account during the current financial period and the raising of money to meet such expenditure. (Repealed by London County Council (Finance Consolidation) Act 1912 (2 & 3 Geo. 5. c. cv))
Mid Kent Water Act 1898	61 & 62 Vict. c. ccxxiii	12 August 1898
An Act to dissolve and re-incorporate the Mid Kent Water Company Limited to extend their limits of supply and to confer further powers for the construction of works the raising of capital and otherwise in relation to their undertaking.
Sheffield District Railway Act 1898	61 & 62 Vict. c. ccxxiv	12 August 1898
An Act to transfer to and vest in the Sheffield District Railway Company the Treeton and Brightside Railway of the Midland Railway Company to abandon certain authorised railways of the Company to confirm agreements between the Company and other companies and for other purposes.
Carlisle Corporation (Water) Act 1898	61 & 62 Vict. c. ccxxv	12 August 1898
An Act to empower the Corporation of Carlisle to obtain water from Old Water and New Water and other tributaries of the River Gelt in the county of Cumberland for the supply of the city of Carlisle and other places within their limits of supply and for other purposes.
Forres Water Act 1898	61 & 62 Vict. c. ccxxvi	12 August 1898
An Act to enable the Provost Magistrates and Town Council of the Royal Burgh of Forres to purchase the undertaking of the Forres Water Company Limited to authorise them to construct new works and to supply water to the Royal Burgh of Forres and the parishes of Forres Rafford and Dallas in the county of Elgin.
Newcastle-upon-Tyne Corporation (New Infirmary Site) Act 1898 (repealed)	61 & 62 Vict. c. ccxxvii	12 August 1898
An Act to empower the Mayor Aldermen and Citizens of the City and County of Newcastle-upon-Tyne to convey to the Trustees of the Newcastle-upon-Tyne Royal Infirmary a portion of the Castle Leazes as a site for a new infirmary. (Repealed by Newcastle-upon-Tyne Moor Act 1988 (c. xxxi))
North British Railway (General Powers) Act 1898	61 & 62 Vict. c. ccxxviii	12 August 1898
An Act to confer further powers upon the North British Railway Company in connexion with their undertaking to authorise the Burntisland Harbour Commissioners to lease certain of their lands and for other purposes.
Portsmouth Corporation Tramways Act 1898	61 & 62 Vict. c. ccxxix	12 August 1898
An Act to confer further powers upon the Mayor Aldermen and Burgesses of the Borough of Portsmouth with reference to the acquisition construction and working of Tramways in the said Borough and for other purposes.
Filey Water and Gas Act 1898	61 & 62 Vict. c. ccxxx	12 August 1898
An Act to authorise the Urban District Council of Filey to supply water and gas and to acquire the undertaking of the Filey Water and Gas Company.
Newcastle and Gateshead Waterworks Act 1898 (repealed)	61 & 62 Vict. c. ccxxxi	12 August 1898
An Act for the granting of further powers to the Newcastle and Gateshead Water Company and for other purposes. (Repealed by Newcastle and Gateshead Water (Consolidation etc.) Order 1982 (SI 1982/1718))
Devonport and District Tramways Act 1898	61 & 62 Vict. c. ccxxxii	12 August 1898
An Act for incorporating and conferring powers on the Devonport and District Tramways Company and for other purposes.
Chelsea Electricity Supply Act 1898	61 & 62 Vict. c. ccxxxiii	12 August 1898
An Act to empower the Chelsea Electricity Supply Company Limited to acquire lands and erect generating stations and for other purposes.
London and North Western Railway Act 1898	61 & 62 Vict. c. ccxxxiv	12 August 1898
An Act for conferring further powers upon the London and North Western Railway Company in relation to their own undertaking and other undertakings in which they are interested jointly with other companies and for other purposes.
Metropolitan Electric Supply Company Act 1898	61 & 62 Vict. c. ccxxxv	12 August 1898
An Act to empower the Metropolitan Electric Supply Company Limited to use lands at Acton Lane for the purpose of their undertaking and to lay certain cables or wires in streets and along the Grand Junction Canal and for other purposes.
Rochdale Corporation Water Act 1898	61 & 62 Vict. c. ccxxxvi	12 August 1898
An Act to authorise the Mayor Aldermen and Burgesses of the County Borough of Rochdale to acquire the undertaking of the Todmorden Waterworks Company to construct additional waterworks and for other purposes.
Seaham Harbour Dock Act 1898	61 & 62 Vict. c. ccxxxvii	12 August 1898
An Act to authorise the improvement of the existing Harbour and the construction of a Dock at Seaham Harbour in the County of Durham and works connected therewith and for other purposes.
Wath-upon-Dearne Urban District Council Water Act 1898	61 & 62 Vict. c. ccxxxviii	12 August 1898
An Act to provide for the sale and transfer of the undertaking of the West Melton Waterworks Company Limited to the Wath-upon-Dearne Urban District Council and to confer further powers on the said Council with reference to the supply of water and for other purposes.
Windsor and Ascot Railway Act 1898	61 & 62 Vict. c. ccxxxix	12 August 1898
An Act to incorporate a Company for making Railways between Windsor and Ascot and for other purposes.
Heywood Waterworks (Transfer) Act 1898 (repealed)	61 & 62 Vict. c. ccxl	12 August 1898
An Act to extend the time for the construction of certain waterworks authorised by the Heywood Waterworks Act 1877 (Note: Heywood Waterworks Act 1877 (40 & 41 Vict. c. clii)) to vest the water undertaking of the Heywood Corporation in a joint Board and for other purposes. (Repealed by West Pennine Water Order 1968 (SI 1968/512))
Todmorden Corporation Water Act 1898 (repealed)	61 & 62 Vict. c. ccxli	12 August 1898
An Act to authorise the Mayor Aldermen and Burgesses of the Borough of Todmorden to construct certain reservoirs and other waterworks and for other purposes. (Repealed by West Yorkshire Act 1980 (c. xiv))
Bolton Turton and Westhoughton Extension Act 1898	61 & 62 Vict. c. ccxlii	12 August 1898
An Act to extend the Borough of Bolton and the Urban Districts of Turton and Westhoughton and for other purposes.
Glasgow Corporation (Sewage, &c.) Act 1898	61 & 62 Vict. c. ccxliii	12 August 1898
An Act to authorise the Corporation of Glasgow to acquire additional lands and to construct additional works for Sewage purposes to raise further moneys and for other purposes.
Knott End Railway Act 1898	61 & 62 Vict. c. ccxliv	12 August 1898
An Act for making a Light Railway between Knott End and Pilling in the County Palatine of Lancaster and for other purposes.
Rhymney and Aber Valleys Gas and Water Act 1898	61 & 62 Vict. c. ccxlv	12 August 1898
An Act for incorporating the Rhymney and Aber Valleys Gas and Water Company for conferring powers on them for the construction of works the supply of gas and water the purchase of certain gas and water undertakings and for other purposes.
Kingstown and Kingsbridge Junction Railway (Abandonment) Act 1898 (repealed)	61 & 62 Vict. c. ccxlvi	12 August 1898
An Act for the abandonment of the Kingstown and Kingsbridge Junction Railway. (Repealed by Statute Law (Repeals) Act 2013 (c. 2))
Mersey Railway (Capital) Act 1898	61 & 62 Vict. c. ccxlvii	12 August 1898
An Act to provide for the Redemption of the Mersey Railway Redeemable First Debenture Stock and for other purposes.
Lancashire, Derbyshire and East Coast Railway Act 1898	61 & 62 Vict. c. ccxlviii	12 August 1898
An Act to authorise the Lancashire Derbyshire and East Coast Railway Company to construct certain new and substituted railways in connexion with their Chesterfield and Lincoln Separate Undertaking to raise additional capital and for other purposes.
Lincoln and East Coast Railway and Dock Act 1898 (repealed)	61 & 62 Vict. c. ccxlix	12 August 1898
An Act to empower the Lincoln and Coast Railway and Dock Company to abandon the construction of certain authorised harbour works and to construct other works in lieu thereof to transfer to the Company the undertakings of the Louth and East Coast and Sutton and Willoughby Railway Companies to confirm agreements with those Companies and with the Great Northern Railway Company for the raising of additional capital by the Company and for other purposes. (Repealed by Lincoln and East Coast Railway and Dock (Abandonment) Act 1902 (2 Edw. 7. c. iii))
Middlesex County Council Act 1898 (repealed)	61 & 62 Vict. c. ccl	12 August 1898
An Act to make more effectual provision for preventing the pollution and obstruction of the streams in the County of Middlesex and to confer further powers on the County Council of Middlesex for that purpose to give to the Council powers in relation to making loans to Local Authorities main roads and other matters and to enlarge in some respects the powers of District Councils in the said County. (Repealed by Middlesex County Council Act 1944 (7 & 8 Geo. 6. c.xxi))
Liverpool Corporation Act 1898	61 & 62 Vict. c. ccli	12 August 1898
An Act for authorising the Corporation of the City of Liverpool to execute certain street improvements and to acquire and appropriate permanently as open spaces certain Burial Grounds within the City for conferring further powers on the Corporation in relation to children trading in the streets and other matters for amending various Local Acts in force within the City and for other purposes.
Fishguard and Rosslare Railways and Harbours Act 1898	61 & 62 Vict. c. cclii	12 August 1898
An Act to authorise the construction by the Fishguard and Rosslare Railways and Harbours Company of new railways from Cork to Fermoy and Waterford to Rosslare and the acquisition by the Company of the undertakings of the Fermoy and Lismore and the Waterford Dungarvan and Lismore Railway Companies to confer running powers over certain railways to extend the time for completion of works authorised by the Fishguard Bay Railway and Pier Act 1893 (Note: Fishguard Bay Railway and Pier Act 1893 (56 & 57 Vict. c. xcvii)) and for other purposes.
Great Central Railway Act 1898	61 & 62 Vict. c. ccliii	12 August 1898
An Act to enable the Great Central Railway Company to make new railways to acquire additional lands to stop up certain streets to extend the time for the compulsory purchase of certain lands for the completion of certain railways and for the sale of superfluous lands to raise additional capital to confer further powers upon the Manchester South Junction and Altrincham Railway Company to confirm an agreement with the Great Northern Railway Company to make agreements with the Great Western Railway Company and for other purposes.
Great Western Railway (New Works) Act 1898	61 & 62 Vict. c. ccliv	12 August 1898
An Act to empower the Great Western Railway Company to make new railways a harbour at Weymouth and other works and for other purposes.
Keighley Corporation Act 1898	61 & 62 Vict. c. cclv	12 August 1898
An Act to empower the Mayor Aldermen and Burgesses of the Borough of Keighley to construct additional waterworks to purchase lands for the protection of their waters and waterworks to make new streets and street improvements and to extend the powers of the Corporation in regard to the health local government and improvement of the Borough and for other purposes.
London United Tramways Act 1898	61 & 62 Vict. c. cclvi	12 August 1898
An Act for conferring further powers on the London United Tramways Limited for constructing tramways and widening and altering roads for using mechanical power on their tramways and for other purposes.
Paignton Improvement Act 1898 (repealed)	61 & 62 Vict. c. cclvii	12 August 1898
An Act to confer powers upon the Urban District Council of Paignton in the County of Devon with respect to the purchase and laying out of land for a Recreation Ground to make better provision for the improvement health and local government of the District and for other purposes. (Repealed by Torbay Corporation Act 1971 (c. xxxiii))
St. Helens Corporation Act 1898	61 & 62 Vict. c. cclviii	12 August 1898
An Act to authorise the construction of tramways in and near the Borough of St. Helens to extend the boundaries of that Borough and to confer further powers on the Corporation of St. Helens in regard to streets buildings sewers and drains and the health local government and improvement of the Borough and for other purposes.
West Ham Corporation Act 1898	61 & 62 Vict. c. cclix	12 August 1898
An Act to confer further powers upon the Mayor Aldermen and Burgesses of the County Borough of West Ham and to make further provision for the good government of that Borough and for other purposes.
Wey Valley, Frimley and Farnham Water Act 1898	61 & 62 Vict. c. cclx	12 August 1898
An Act for incorporating and conferring powers upon the Wey Valley Water Company for extending the limits of supply of and conferring further powers upon the Frimley and Farnborough District Water Company and the Farnham Water Company Limited for authorising agreements between those Companies and other water companies and for other purposes.
Whitechapel and Bow Railway Act 1898	61 & 62 Vict. c. cclxi	12 August 1898
An Act to empower the Metropolitan District Railway Company to subscribe towards the capital of the Whitechapel and Bow Railway Company and for other purposes.
Cardiff Railway Act 1898	61 & 62 Vict. c. cclxii	12 August 1898
An Act for empowering the Cardiff Railway Company to construct new railways in the county of Glamorgan to make further provisions as to the capital of the Company and for other purposes.

=== Private and personal acts ===
Short title	Citation	Royal assent
Long title
Walker's Estate Act 1898	61 & 62 Vict. c. 1 Pr.	25 July 1898
An Act to confer further powers on the Executors and Trustees of the Will of the late Thomas Andrew Walker in relation to his real and personal estate.
Hart's Divorce Act 1898 (Note: This act was not printed by the Queen's Printer.)	61 & 62 Vict. c. 2 Pr.	23 May 1898
An Act to dissolve the Manila of Edith Susan Anna Vernon Hart the wife of Henry Chichester Hart with the said Henry Chichester Hart and to enable her to marry again and for other purposes.
Vigors' Divorce Act 1898	61 & 62 Vict. c. 3 Pr.	2 August 1898
An Act to dissolve the Marriage of Cliffe Henry Vigors of the New Barracks Limerick a Captain in the Royal Irish Regiment with Katharine Mary Vigors his now wife and to enable him to marry again and for other purposes.

=== Sources ===
- The Public General Statutes, Volume 35: 61 & 62 Victoria – 1898. 1898 – via Internet Archive.

== See also ==
- List of acts of the Parliament of the United Kingdom
