= Solicitors (Ireland) Act 1898 =

Act of the Parliament of the United Kingdom

Solicitors (Ireland) Act 1898 (Note: Section 1.)
- Act of Parliament
- Parliament of the United Kingdom
- Long title: An Act to amend and consolidate the Laws relating to Solicitors and to the service of Indentured Apprentices in Ireland.
- Citation: 61 & 62 Vict. c. 17
- Territorial extent: Ireland (Note: Section 2.)

Dates
- Royal assent: 25 July 1898
- Commencement: 25 July 1898 (in part); 1 January 1899 (rest of act); (Note: Section 3.)
- Repealed: 1 September 1976
Other legislation
Repeals/revokes	Attorneys and Solicitors Act (Ireland) 1866
Repealed by	Solicitors (Northern Ireland) Order 1976

Status: Repealed

Text of statute as originally enacted

The Solicitors (Ireland) Act 1898 (61 & 62 Vict. c. 17) was an act of the Parliament of the United Kingdom that amended and consolidated enactments relating to solicitors and the service of indentured apprentices in Ireland.

== Provisions ==
=== Repealed enactments ===
Section 63 of the act repealed the Attorneys and Solicitors Act (Ireland) 1866 (29 & 30 Vict. c. 84).

== Subsequent developments ==
The whole act was repealed by article 82(1) of, and schedule 3 to, the Solicitors (Northern Ireland) Order 1976 (SI 1976/582 (NI 12)), which came into operation on 1 September 1976.
