= Public Libraries Consolidation (Scotland) Act 1887 =

Act of the Parliament of the United Kingdom

Public Libraries Consolidation (Scotland) Act 1887 (Note: Section 1.)
- Act of Parliament
- Parliament of the United Kingdom
- Long title: An Act to amend and consolidate the Public Libraries (Scotland) Acts.
- Citation: 50 & 51 Vict. c. 42
- Territorial extent: Scotland (Note: Section 1.)

Dates
- Royal assent: 16 September 1887
- Commencement: 16 September 1887 (Note: The Acts of Parliament (Commencement) Act 1793.)
Other legislation
Amends	See § Repealed enactments
Repeals/revokes	See § Repealed enactments
Amended by	Public Libraries (Scotland) Act 1920; Local Government (Scotland) Act 1947

Status: Amended

Text of statute as originally enacted

Revised text of statute as amended

Text of the Public Libraries Consolidation (Scotland) Act 1887 as in force today (including any amendments) within the United Kingdom, from legislation.gov.uk.

The Public Libraries Consolidation (Scotland) Act 1887 (50 & 51 Vict. c. 42) is an act of the Parliament of the United Kingdom that consolidated enactments related to public libraries in Scotland.

== Provisions ==
=== Repealed enactments ===
Section 3 of the act repealed 4 enactments, listed in that section, as far as they related to Scotland.

Citation	Short title	Description	Extent of repeal
30 & 31 Vict. c. 37	Public Libraries Act (Scotland) 1867	The Public Libraries (Scotland) Act, 1867.	The whole act.
34 & 35 Vict. c. 59	Public Libraries Act (Scotland, 1867) Amendment Act 1871	The Public Libraries Act (Scotland 1867) Amendment Act, 1871.	The whole act.
40 & 41 Vict. c. 54	Public Libraries Amendment Act 1877	The Public Libraries Amendment Act, 1877.	The whole act.
47 & 48 Vict. c. 37	Public Libraries Act 1884	The Public Libraries Act, 1884.	The whole act.
