= Public Libraries (Scotland) Act 1920 =

Act of the Parliament of the United Kingdom

Public Libraries (Scotland) Act 1920 (Note: Section 2.)
- Act of Parliament
- Parliament of the United Kingdom
- Long title: An Act to amend the Public Libraries Consolidation (Scotland) Act, 1887.
- Citation: 10 & 11 Geo. 5. c. 45
- Territorial extent: United Kingdom

Dates
- Royal assent: 16 August 1920
- Commencement: 15 May 1920 (Note: Section 1(1).)
- Repealed: 16 May 1975 (Note: The Local Government (Scotland) Act 1973 (Commencement No. 2) Order 1973 (SI 1973/2181).)
Other legislation
Amends	Public Libraries Consolidation (Scotland) Act 1887
Amended by	Local Government (Scotland) Act 1948
Repealed by	Local Government (Scotland) Act 1973

Status: Repealed

Text of statute as originally enacted

The Public Libraries (Scotland) Act 1920 (10 & 11 Geo. 5. c. 45) was an act of the Parliament of the United Kingdom. It became law on 16 August 1920.

It amended the Public Libraries Consolidation (Scotland) Act 1887 (50 & 51 Vict. c. 42), providing that with effect from 15 May 1920, the rating limit under section 8 of that act was increased from 1d to 3d.

== See also ==
- Public Libraries Act
- List of libraries in Scotland

== Bibliography ==
- Oliver & Boyd's new Edinburgh almanac and national repository for the year 1921. p228
