= Metropolitan Streets Act 1867 =

Act of the Parliament of the United Kingdom

Metropolitan Streets Act 1867 (Note: Section 1.)
- Act of Parliament
- Parliament of the United Kingdom
- Long title: An Act for regulating the Traffic in the Metropolis, and for making Provision for the greater Security of Persons passing through the Streets, and for other Purposes.
- Citation: 30 & 31 Vict. c. 134
- Territorial extent: United Kingdom

Dates
- Royal assent: 20 August 1867
- Commencement: 1 November 1867 (Note: Section 29.)
Other legislation
Amended by	Metropolitan Streets Act Amendment Act 1867; Statute Law Revision Act 1875; Metropolitan Streets Act 1885; Dogs Act 1906; Public Health (London) Act 1936; London Government Act 1963; Statute Law (Repeals) Act 1973; Statute Law (Repeals) Act 1976; Statute Law (Repeals) Act 1981; Statute Law (Repeals) Act 1989; Statute Law (Repeals) Act 1993; Statute Law (Repeals) Act 2004

Status: Partially repealed

Text of statute as originally enacted

Revised text of statute as amended

Text of the Metropolitan Streets Act 1867 as in force today (including any amendments) within the United Kingdom, from legislation.gov.uk.

Metropolitan Streets Act Amendment Act 1867 (Note: Section 3.)
- Act of Parliament
- Parliament of the United Kingdom
- Long title: An Act for the amendment of "The Metropolitan Streets Act, 1867."
- Citation: 31 & 32 Vict. c. 5
- Territorial extent: United Kingdom

Dates
- Royal assent: 7 December 1867
- Commencement: 7 December 1867 (Note: The Acts of Parliament (Commencement) Act 1793.)
Other legislation
Amends	Metropolitan Streets Act 1867
Amended by	Statute Law Revision Act 1875

Status: Amended

Text of statute as originally enacted

Revised text of statute as amended

Text of the Metropolitan Streets Act Amendment Act 1867 as in force today (including any amendments) within the United Kingdom, from legislation.gov.uk.

Metropolitan Streets Act 1885
- Act of Parliament
- Parliament of the United Kingdom
- Long title: An Act to extend the Area to which the Metropolitan Streets Act, 1867, applies.
- Citation: 48 & 49 Vict. c. 18
- Territorial extent: United Kingdom

Dates
- Royal assent: 21 May 1885
- Commencement: 21 May 1885
- Repealed: 5 November 1993
Other legislation
Amends	Metropolitan Streets Act 1867
Repealed by	Statute Law (Repeals) Act 1993

Status: Repealed

Text of statute as originally enacted

Revised text of statute as amended

The Metropolitan Streets Act 1867 (30 & 31 Vict. c. 134) is an act of the Parliament of the United Kingdom applying to the City of London and all places and parishes then within the jurisdiction of the Metropolitan Board of Works. Following public meetings and press criticism of the original act's likely effect on street traders' livelihoods, the Metropolitan Streets Act Amendment Act 1867 (31 & 32 Vict. c. 5) was granted royal assent on 7 December the same year.

== Provisions ==
=== Part I (Sections 5 – 16) ===
This banned refuse collection and the driving of cattle, sheep, goats, pigs, horses, asses and mules through the streets between 10 am and 7 pm and required stagecoaches only to stop on the left-hand side of the road and any adverts carried by persons on foot, horseback or in a vehicle to be approved by the Metropolitan and City police commissioners, at a maximum penalty of 10 shillings, though this was not to apply to adverts for newspaper sales. It also banned goods from blocking roads and paths with goods for longer than was needed to load or unload them. (Note: The act granted royal assent in December waived that provision for areas between the footway and the carriageway and for itinerant tradesmen, costermongers and street hawkers.)

The police commissioners were also granted the power to add or remove streets from the act's "Special Limits", subject to having that decision approved by a principal Secretary of State and then advertising it on or near that street for ten days before it came into effect. Within those limits, the commissioners could set, amend and repeal regulations on vehicle traffic other than the numbers of "Metropolitan Stage Carriages", though they could set places where these were not allowed to stop. Coal could not be unloaded on footpaths within the Special Limits nor machinery or ropes set up to unload casks across such footpaths between 10am and 6pm other than for wine and spirit casks, whilst carts with more than four horses or carrying scaffolding, ladders or timber were also banned on roads within the Special Limits between 10am and 7pm.

=== Part II (sections 17 – 29) ===
This covered further specific instances, such as hackney carriages, requiring them to display a "Plate or Mark" showing they had been checked and authorised by the commissioners, banning their use at night without having at least one external lamp (Note: The act granted royal assent in December required the regulations on such lamps to be approved by a principal Secretary of State.) and allowing any hackney carriage on a stand to charge a minimum fare of 1 shilling. It also covered dangerous, stray and lost dogs, with the police required to notify their owners if an address was in their collar and to feed and look after them for three days and allowed to sell or destroy them if they were unclaimed after three days. They were also to destroy them if a magistrate adjudged them to be dangerous and to detain and muzzle stray wild dogs until they were claimed by the owners, who were to pay the expenses of the detention and muzzling.

Part II also enabled the commissioners to license shoeblacks, commissionaires and messengers and set pitches or "standings" for them with a maximum number in each pitch, as well as to put up placards and signs on regulations in the act as a whole. It also banned more than two people from gathering in the street to bet. Proceeds from the sale of stray dogs and the penalties in the act were to be applied according to existing acts relating to the Metropolitan and City Police. Finally, it also extended the provisions of section 52 (Note: "Regulations for preventing Obstructions in the Streets during Public Processions, &c.") of the Metropolitan Police Act 1839 (2 & 3 Vict. c. 47) to the City of London and allowed householders in the City of London to place "a Box or Barrel" of refuse on the kerb for collection before 8am.

== Subsequent developments ==
In section 4, the definition of " the special limits of this Act ", and sections 8 and 26 of the act were repealed by section 1(1) of, and part VI of schedule 1 to, the Statute Law (Repeals) Act 1973, which came into force on 18 July 1973.

Section 17 of the act was repealed by section 1(1) of, and part XVIII of schedule 1 to, the Statute Law (Repeals) Act 1976, which came into force on 27 May 1976.

Section 25 of the act was repealed by section 1(1) of, and part VII of schedule 1 to, the Statute Law (Repeals) Act 1981, which came into force on 21 May 1981.
