= List of acts of the Parliament of the United Kingdom from 1867 =

This is a complete list of acts of the Parliament of the United Kingdom for the year 1867.

Note that the first parliament of the United Kingdom was held in 1801; parliaments between 1707 and 1800 were either parliaments of Great Britain or of Ireland). For acts passed up until 1707, see the list of acts of the Parliament of England and the list of acts of the Parliament of Scotland. For acts passed from 1707 to 1800, see the list of acts of the Parliament of Great Britain. See also the list of acts of the Parliament of Ireland.

For acts of the devolved parliaments and assemblies in the United Kingdom, see the list of acts of the Scottish Parliament, the list of acts of the Northern Ireland Assembly, and the list of acts and measures of Senedd Cymru; see also the list of acts of the Parliament of Northern Ireland.

The number shown after each act's title is its chapter number. Acts passed before 1963 are cited using this number, preceded by the year(s) of the reign during which the relevant parliamentary session was held; thus the Union with Ireland Act 1800 is cited as "39 & 40 Geo. 3 c. 67", meaning the 67th act passed during the session that started in the 39th year of the reign of George III and which finished in the 40th year of that reign. Note that the modern convention is to use Arabic numerals in citations (thus "41 Geo. 3" rather than "41 Geo. III"). Acts of the last session of the Parliament of Great Britain and the first session of the Parliament of the United Kingdom are both cited as "41 Geo. 3".

Some of these acts have a short title. Some of these acts have never had a short title. Some of these acts have a short title given to them by later acts, such as by the Short Titles Act 1896.

== 30 & 31 Vict. ==
The second session of the 19th Parliament of the United Kingdom, which met from 5 February 1867 until 21 August 1867.

=== Public general acts ===
Short title	Citation	Royal assent
Long title
Habeas Corpus Suspension (Ireland) Act 1867 (repealed)	30 & 31 Vict. c. 1	26 February 1867
An Act to further continue the Act of the Twenty-ninth Year of the Reign of Her present Majesty, Chapter One, intituled "An Act to empower the Lord Lieutenant or other Chief Governor or Governors of Ireland to apprehend, and detain for a limited Time, such Persons as he or they shall suspect of conspiring against Her Majesty's Person and Government." (Note: Habeas Corpus Suspension (Ireland) Act 1866 (29 & 30 Vict. c. 1)) (Repealed by Statute Law Revision Act 1875 (38 & 39 Vict. c. 66))
Odessa Marriage Act 1867 (repealed)	30 & 31 Vict. c. 2	29 March 1867
An Act for removing Doubts as to the Validity of certain Marriages between British Subjects at Odessa. (Repealed by Foreign Marriage (Amendment) Act 1988 (c. 44))
British North America Act 1867 known in Canada as the Constitution Act, 1867	30 & 31 Vict. c. 3	29 March 1867
An Act for the Union of Canada, Nova Scotia and New Brunswick, and the Government thereof; and for Purposes connected therewith.
Consolidated Fund (£369,118 5s. 6d.) Act or the Supply Act 1867 (repealed)	30 & 31 Vict. c. 4	29 March 1867
An Act to apply the Sum of Three hundred and sixty-nine thousand one hundred and eighteen Pounds Five Shillings and Sixpence out of the Consolidated Fund to the Service of the Years ending the Thirty-first Day of March One thousand eight hundred and sixty-six and the Thirty-first Day of March One thousand eight hundred and sixty-seven. (Repealed by Statute Law Revision Act 1875 (38 & 39 Vict. c. 66))
Dog Licences Act 1867 (repealed)	30 & 31 Vict. c. 5	29 March 1867
An Act to repeal the Duties of Assessed Taxes on Dogs, and to impose in lieu thereof a Duty of Excise. (Repealed by Dog Licences Act 1959 (7 & 8 Eliz. 2. c. 55))
Metropolitan Poor Act 1867 (repealed)	30 & 31 Vict. c. 6	29 March 1867
An Act for the establishment in the Metropolis of Asylums for the Sick, Insane, and Other Classes of the Poor, and of Dispensaries; and for the Distribution over the Metropolis of Portions of the Charge for Poor Relief; and for other Purposes relating to Poor Relief in the Metropolis. (Repealed by Poor Law Act 1927 (17 & 18 Geo. 5. c. 14) and Local Government Act 1929 (19 & 20 Geo. 5. c. 17))
Consolidated Fund (£7,924,000) Act or the Supply (No. 2) Act 1867 (repealed)	30 & 31 Vict. c. 7	5 April 1867
An Act to apply the Sum of Seven million nine hundred and twenty-four thousand Pounds out of the Consolidated Fund to the Service of the Year ending the Thirty-first Day of March One thousand eight hundred and sixty-eight. (Repealed by Statute Law Revision Act 1875 (38 & 39 Vict. c. 66))
Trades Union Commission Act 1867 (repealed)	30 & 31 Vict. c. 8	5 April 1867
An Act for facilitating in certain Cases the Proceedings of the Commissioners appointed to make Inquiry respecting Trades Unions and other Associations of Employers or Workmen. (Repealed by Statute Law Revision Act 1875 (38 & 39 Vict. c. 66))
School of Physic (Ireland) Amendment Act 1867	30 & 31 Vict. c. 9	5 April 1867
An Act to open the Professorships of Anatomy and Chirurgery, Chemistry and Botany, in the University of Dublin, to all Persons irrespective of their religious Creed; and to amend the Act 40 Geo. 3. (Ireland), Chapter Eighty-four. (Note: Royal College of Physicians, Ireland, Act 1800 (40 Geo. 3. c. 84 (I)))
Sugar Duties Act 1867 or the Duties on Sugar Act 1867 (repealed)	30 & 31 Vict. c. 10	5 April 1867
An Act to amend the Law relating to the Duties and Drawbacks on Sugar. (Repealed by Statute Law Revision Act 1875 (38 & 39 Vict. c. 66))
Recovery of Alimony (Ireland) Act 1867 (repealed)	30 & 31 Vict. c. 11	12 April 1867
An Act to facilitate the Recovery of Arrears of Alimony in certain Cases under Decrees and Orders of the Provincial and Diocesan Courts in Ireland. (Repealed by Statute Law Revision Act 1875 (38 & 39 Vict. c. 66))
Criminal Lunatics Act 1867 (repealed)	30 & 31 Vict. c. 12	12 April 1867
An Act to amend the Law relating to Criminal Lunatics. (Repealed by Criminal Lunatics Act 1884 (47 & 48 Vict. c. 64))
Mutiny Act 1867 (repealed)	30 & 31 Vict. c. 13	12 April 1867
An Act for punishing Mutiny and Desertion, and for the better Payment of the Army and their Quarters. (Repealed by Statute Law Revision Act 1875 (38 & 39 Vict. c. 66))
Marine Mutiny Act 1867 (repealed)	30 & 31 Vict. c. 14	12 April 1867
An Act for the Regulation of Her Majesty's Royal Marine Forces while on shore. (Repealed by Statute Law Revision Act 1875 (38 & 39 Vict. c. 66))
Shipping Dues Exemption Act 1867 (repealed)	30 & 31 Vict. c. 15	12 April 1867
An Act for the Abolition of certain Exemptions from Local Dues on Shipping and on Goods carried in Ships. (Repealed for England and Wales and Scotland by Harbours Act 1964 (c. 40) and for Northern Ireland by Harbours Act (Northern Ireland) 1970 (c. 1 (N.I.)))
Canada Railway Loan Act 1867 (repealed)	30 & 31 Vict. c. 16	12 April 1867
An Act for authorizing a Guarantee of Interest on a Loan to be raised by Canada towards the Construction of a Railway connecting Quebec and Halifax. (Repealed by Statute Law Revision Act 1893 (56 & 57 Vict. c. 14) and Statute Law Revision Act 1950 (14 Geo. 6. c. 6))
Lyon King of Arms Act 1867	30 & 31 Vict. c. 17	3 May 1867
An Act to regulate the Court and Office of the Lyon King of Arms in Scotland, and the Emoluments of the Officers of the same.
Oyster Preservation Act 1867 (repealed)	30 & 31 Vict. c. 18	3 May 1867
An Act for the Preservation and further Protection of Oyster Fisheries. (Repealed by Sea Fisheries Act 1868 (31 & 32 Vict. c. 45))
Petty Sessions (Ireland) Act 1867	30 & 31 Vict. c. 19	31 May 1867
An Act to amend the Petty Sessions Act (Ireland), 1851, (Note: Petty Sessions (Ireland) Act 1851 (14 & 15 Vict. c. 93)) as to the backing of Warrants.
Annual Inclosure Act 1867	30 & 31 Vict. c. 20	31 May 1867
An Act to authorize the Inclosure of certain Lands in pursuance of a Report of the Inclosure Commissioners for England and Wales.
Local Government Supplemental Act 1867	30 & 31 Vict. c. 21	31 May 1867
An Act to confirm certain Provisional Orders under "The Local Government Act, 1858," (Note: Local Government Act 1858 (21 & 22 Vict. c. 98)) relating to the Districts of Gainsborough, Farsley, Bideford, Canterbury, Chepping Wycombe, Worthing, and Wednesfield; and for other Purposes relative to certain Districts under that Act.
	Provisional Order for altering the Boundaries of the District of Gainsborough in the County of Lincoln, under the Provisions of the Local Government Act, 1858.	
	Provisional Order altering the Boundaries of the District of Farsley, in the West Riding of the County of York, under the Provisions of the Local Government Act, 1858.	
	Provisional Order for extending the Borrowing Powers of the Bideford Local Board (in the County of Devon).	
	Provisional Order to make Provision for ascertaining the Value of Property, &c. of the late Pavement Commissioners of Canterbury, and for other Purposes therein set forth.	
	Provisional Order repealing and altering Parts of a Local Act (Note: Chepping Wycombe Improvement Act 1813 (53 Geo. 3. c. clxiv)) in force within the District of the Chepping Wycombe Local Board.	
	Provisional Order for the Alteration of the Provisional Order applying the Public Health Act, 1848, (Note: Public Health Act 1848 (11 & 12 Vict. c. 63)) to the Town of Worthing in the County of Sussex.	
	Provisional Order for altering a Provisional Order relating to the District of Wednesfield, in the County of Stafford, under the Provisions of the Local Government Act, 1858.	
Land Drainage Supplemental Act 1867	30 & 31 Vict. c. 22	31 May 1867
An Act to confirm a Provisional Order under "The Land Drainage Act, 1861." (Note: Land Drainage Act 1861 (24 & 25 Vict. c. 133))
Customs and Inland Revenue Act 1867 (repealed)	30 & 31 Vict. c. 23	31 May 1867
An Act to grant and alter certain Duties of Customs and Inland Revenue, and for other Purposes relating thereto. (Repealed by Stamp Duties Management Act 1891 (54 & 55 Vict. c. 38) and Stamp Act 1891 (54 & 55 Vict. c. 39))
Expenses of Fortifications for Protecting Royal Arsenals (No. 1) Act 1867 (repealed)	30 & 31 Vict. c. 24	31 May 1867
An Act to amend an Act of the Twenty-eighth and Twenty-ninth Years of Her present Majesty, Chapter Sixty-one, (Note: Fortifications, Royal Arsenals, etc. Act 1865 (28 & 29 Vict. c. 61)) for providing a further Sum towards defraying the Expenses of constructing Fortifications for the Protection of the Royal Arsenals and Dockyards and the Ports of Dover and Portland, and of creating a Central Arsenal. (Repealed by Revenue, Friendly Societies, and National Debt Act 1882 (45 & 46 Vict. c. 72))
Habeas Corpus Suspension (Ireland) Act 1867 (repealed)	30 & 31 Vict. c. 25	31 May 1867
An Act to further continue the Act of the Twenty-ninth Year of the Reign of Her present Majesty, Chapter One, intituled "An Act to empower the Lord Lieutenant or other Chief Governor or Governors of Ireland to apprehend, and detain for a limited Time, such Persons as he or they shall suspect of conspiring against Her Majesty's Person and Government." (Note: Habeas Corpus Suspension (Ireland) Act 1866 (29 & 30 Vict. c. 1)) (Repealed by Statute Law Revision Act 1875 (38 & 39 Vict. c. 66))
National Debt Act 1867 (repealed)	30 & 31 Vict. c. 26	31 May 1867
An Act to provide for the Conversion of Twenty-four million Pounds Sterling of the National Debt into Terminable Annuities. (Repealed by Savings Bank Investment Act 1869 (32 & 33 Vict. c. 59))
Warehoused British Spirits Act 1867 (repealed)	30 & 31 Vict. c. 27	17 June 1867
An Act to allow Warehoused British Spirits to be bottled for Home Consumption. (Repealed by Spirits Act 1880 (43 & 44 Vict. c. 24))
Labouring Classes Dwelling Houses Act 1867 (repealed)	30 & 31 Vict. c. 28	17 June 1867
An Act to amend "The Labouring Classes Dwellings Acts, 1866." (Note: Labouring Classes Dwelling Houses Act 1866 (29 & 30 Vict. c. 28)) (Note: Labouring Classes Lodging Houses and Dwellings Act (Ireland) 1866 (29 & 30 Vict. c. 44)) (Repealed by Housing of the Working Classes Act 1890 (53 & 54 Vict. c. 70))
Banking Companies' (Shares) Act 1867 (repealed)	30 & 31 Vict. c. 29	17 June 1867
An Act to amend the Law in respect of the Sale and Purchase of Shares in Joint Stock Banking Companies. (Repealed by Statute Law Revision Act 1966 (c. 5))
Consolidated Fund (£14,000,000) Act or the Supply (No. 3) Act 1867 (repealed)	30 & 31 Vict. c. 30	17 June 1867
An Act for raising the Sum of One million seven hundred thousand Pounds by Exchequer Bonds for the Service of the Year ending on the Thirty-first Day of March One thousand eight hundred and sixty-eight. (Repealed by Statute Law Revision Act 1875 (38 & 39 Vict. c. 66))
Exchequer Bonds Act 1867 (repealed)	30 & 31 Vict. c. 31	17 June 1867
An Act for raising the Sum of One million seven hundred thousand Pounds by Exchequer Bonds for the Service of the Year ending on the Thirty-first Day of March One thousand eight hundred and sixty-eight. (Repealed by Statute Law Revision Act 1875 (38 & 39 Vict. c. 66))
Public Works Loans Act 1867 (repealed)	30 & 31 Vict. c. 32	17 June 1867
An Act to authorize further Advances of Money out of the Consolidated Fund for carrying on Public Works and Fisheries and for the Employment of the Poor; for the Purposes of the Public Works (Manufacturing Districts) Acts 1863, 1864; and to amend the Acts authorizing Advances for Public Works. (Repealed by Public Works Loans Act 1875 (38 & 39 Vict. c. 89))
Pier and Harbour Orders Confirmation Act 1867	30 & 31 Vict. c. 33	17 June 1867
An Act for confirming certain Provisional Orders made by the Board of Trade under The General Pier and Harbour Act, 1861, (Note: General Pier and Harbour Act 1861 (24 & 25 Vict. c. 45)) relating to Balbriggan, Cromer, Dingwall, Girvan, Rothesay, and Seaford.
	Balbriggan Pier and Harbour Order 1867 Order for the Maintenance and Regulation of the Pier and Harbour of Balbriggan, in the County of Dublin, being an Outport or Creek of the Port of Dublin.	
	Cromer Pier Order 1867 Order for the Construction Maintenance and Regulation of a Pier and Harbour at Cromer, in the County of Norfolk.	
	Dingwall Harbour Order 1867 Order for the Management and Improvement of the Harbour of Dingwall, in the County of Ross.	
	Harbour of Girvan Improvement Order 1867 Order for the Amendment of "The Harbour of Girvan Improvement Order, 1865," with respect to the Levying of Rates and to the Borrowing of Money.	
	Rothesay Harbour Order 1867 Order for the Extension and Construction of Piers, and for the Regulation of the Harbour of Rothesay, in the Burgh of Rothesay and County of Bute.	
	Seaford Pier Order 1867 Order for the Construction Maintenance and Regulation of a Pier at Seaford in the County of Sussex.	
Army Enlistment Act 1867 (repealed)	30 & 31 Vict. c. 34	20 June 1867
An Act for limiting the Period of Enlistment in Her Majesty's Army. (Repealed by Regulation of the Forces Act 1881 (44 & 45 Vict. c. 57))
Criminal Law Amendment Act 1867	30 & 31 Vict. c. 35	20 June 1867
An Act to remove some defects in the Administration of the Criminal Law.
Chester Courts Act 1867 (repealed)	30 & 31 Vict. c. 36	15 July 1867
An Act to authorize the Quarter Sessions of the Peace for the Borough and City of Chester and County of the same City, and the Portmote and Pentice Courts for the City of Chester, to be held at the Castle of Chester, and to confer additional Powers upon the Sheriff of the County of Chester in exoneration of the Sheriff of the City of Chester. (Repealed by Courts Act 1971 (c. 23))
Public Libraries Act (Scotland) 1867 or the Public Libraries (Scotland) Act 1867 (repealed)	30 & 31 Vict. c. 37	15 July 1867
An Act to amend and consolidate the Public Libraries Acts (Scotland). (Repealed by Public Libraries Consolidation (Scotland) Act 1887 (50 & 51 Vict. c. 42))
Bunhill Fields Burial Ground Act 1867 (repealed)	30 & 31 Vict. c. 38	15 July 1867
An Act for the Preservation of Bunhill Fields Burial Ground in the County of Middlesex as an open Space; and for other Purposes relating thereto. (Repealed by City of London (Various Powers) Act 1960 (c. xxxvi))
Metropolitan Police (Receiver) Act 1867	30 & 31 Vict. c. 39	15 July 1867
An Act for amending the Law with respect to the Accounts of the Receiver for the Metropolitan Police District; and for other Purposes relating to the Metropolitan Police.
Houses of Parliament Act 1867	30 & 31 Vict. c. 40	15 July 1867
An Act to authorize the Commissioners of Her Majesty's Works and Public Buildings to acquire Lands for the Purposes of the New Palace at Westminster, and to construct an Embankment on the North Shore of the River Thames in the Parish of Saint John the Evangelist, Westminster.
National Gallery Enlargement Act 1867 (repealed)	30 & 31 Vict. c. 41	15 July 1867
An Act to make further Provision for the Enlargement of the National Gallery. (Repealed by Statute Law (Repeals) Act 1978 (c. 45))
Hypothec Amendment (Scotland) Act 1867 (repealed)	30 & 31 Vict. c. 42	15 July 1867
An Act to amend the Law relating to the Landlord’s Right of Hypothec in Scotland, in so far as respects Land held for Agricultural or Grazing Purposes. (Repealed by Bankruptcy and Diligence etc. (Scotland) Act 2007 (asp 3))
Drainage and Improvement of Lands Supplemental Act (Ireland) 1867 or the Drainage and Improvement of Lands Supplemental (Ireland) Act 1867	30 & 31 Vict. c. 43	15 July 1867
An Act to confirm a Provisional Order under "The Drainage and Improvement of Lands Ireland Act, 1863," (Note: Drainage and Improvement of Lands Ireland Act 1863 (26 & 27 Vict. c. 88)) and the Acts amending the same.
	In the matter of Brickey Drainage District, county of Waterford.	
Chancery (Ireland) Act 1867 (repealed)	30 & 31 Vict. c. 44	15 July 1867
An Act to amend the Constitution, Practice, and Procedure of the Court of Chancery in Ireland. (Repealed by Judicature (Northern Ireland) Act 1978 (c. 23))
Vice-Admiralty Courts Act Amendment Act 1867 (repealed)	30 & 31 Vict. c. 45	15 July 1867
An Act to extend and amend the Vice-Admiralty Courts Act, 1863. (Note: Vice Admiralty Courts Act 1863 (26 & 27 Vict. c. 24)) (Repealed by Colonial Courts of Admiralty Act 1890 (53 & 54 Vict. c. 27))
County Treasurers (Ireland) Act 1867 (repealed)	30 & 31 Vict. c. 46	15 July 1867
An Act to amend the Law relating to the Office of County Treasurer in Ireland. (Repealed by Local Government Act (Northern Ireland) 1972 (c. 9 (N.I.)))
Lis Pendens Act 1867 (repealed)	30 & 31 Vict. c. 47	15 July 1867
An Act to amend the Companies Act, 1862, (Note: Companies Act 1862 (25 & 26 Vict. c. 89)) and also the Act passed in the Session held in the Twenty-third and Twenty-fourth Years of the Reign of Her Majesty, intituled "An Act to simplify and amend the Practice as to the Entry of Satisfaction on Crown Debts and on Judgments." (Note: Crown Debts and Judgments Act 1860 (23 & 24 Vict. c. 115)) (Repealed by Statute Law Revision Act 1875 (38 & 39 Vict. c. 66) and Land Charges Act 1925 (15 & 16 Geo. 5. c. 22))
Sale of Land by Auction Act 1867	30 & 31 Vict. c. 48	15 July 1867
An Act for Amending the Law of Auctions of Estates.
Local Government Supplemental Act 1867 (No. 3) or the Local Government Supplemental (No. 3) Act 1867 (repealed)	30 & 31 Vict. c. 49	15 July 1867
An Act to confirm a certain Provisional Order under "The Local Government Act, 1858," relating to the District of Halifax; and for other Purposes relative to the said District under that Act. (Repealed by West Yorkshire Act 1980 (c. xiv))
	Provisional Order putting in force The Lands Clauses Consolidation Act, 1845, (Note: Lands Clauses Consolidation Act 1845 (8 & 9 Vict. c. 18)) within the District of the Halifax Local Board of Health, for the Purchase of Land by the said Board for Street Improvements.	
Bridges (Ireland) Act 1867 (repealed)	30 & 31 Vict. c. 50	15 July 1867
An Act to afford further Facilities for the Erection of certain Bridges in Ireland. (Repealed by Statute Law Revision Act 1893 (56 & 57 Vict. c. 14), Statute Law Revision Act (Northern Ireland) 1954 (c. 35 (N.I.)) and Statute Law Revision (Northern Ireland) Act 1976 (c. 12))
Land Tax Commissioners Act 1867 (repealed)	30 & 31 Vict. c. 51	15 July 1867
An Act to appoint additional Commissioners for executing the Acts for granting a Land Tax and other Rates and Taxes. (Repealed by Statute Law Revision Act 1950 (14 Geo. 6. c. 6))
Herring Fisheries (Scotland) Act 1867 (repealed)	30 & 31 Vict. c. 52	15 July 1867
An Act to alter and amend the Acts relating to the British White Herring Fishery. (Repealed by Inshore Fishing (Scotland) Act 1984 (c. 26))
Limerick Harbour (Composition of Debt) Act 1867 or the Limerick Harbour Act 1867 (Note: Though this short title actually belongs to the local and personal act 30 & 31 Vict. c. clv.)	30 & 31 Vict. c. 53	15 July 1867
An Act to authorize the Commissioners of Her Majesty's Treasury to compound the Public Debt and Interest due by the Limerick Harbour Commissioners, and to make Arrangements for the Payment of the Amount for which such Debt is to be compounded; and for the Transfer of Wellesley Bridge in the City of Limerick to the Commissioners of Public Works; and for other Purposes.
Charitable Donations and Bequests (Ireland) Act 1867 or the Charitable Donations and Bequests Act (Ireland) 1867 (repealed)	30 & 31 Vict. c. 54	15 July 1867
An Act to amend the Law of Charitable Donations and Bequests in Ireland. (Repealed by Charities Act (Northern Ireland) 1964 (c. 33 (N.I.)))
Lunatics (Scotland) Act 1867 (repealed)	30 & 31 Vict. c. 55	15 July 1867
An Act to enlarge for the present Year the Time within which certain Certificates regarding Lunatics in Scotland may be granted. (Repealed by Statute Law Revision Act 1875 (38 & 39 Vict. c. 66))
Galway Harbour (Composition of Debt) Act 1867 or the Galway Harbour Act 1867	30 & 31 Vict. c. 56	15 July 1867
An Act to authorize the Commissioners of Her Majesty's Treasury to compound the Public Debt and Interest due by the Galway Harbour Commissioners, and to make Arrangements for the Payment of the Amounts for which such Debt and another Debt are to be compounded; and for other Purposes.
Blackwater Bridge Act 1867	30 & 31 Vict. c. 57	15 July 1867
An Act to authorize the Commissioners of Her Majesty's Treasury to compound the Public Debt due by the Commissioners of the Bridge across the River Blackwater near the Town of Youghal in the County of Cork, and for the Transfer of the said Bridge to the Grand Juries of the Counties of Cork and Waterford; and for other Purposes relating thereto.
Edinburgh Provisional Order Confirmation Act 1867 (repealed)	30 & 31 Vict. c. 58	15 July 1867
An Act to confirm a Provisional Order under the General Police and Improvement (Scotland) Act, 1862, (Note: General Police and Improvement (Scotland) Act 1862 (25 & 26 Vict. c. 101)) relating to the City of Edinburgh. (Repealed by Edinburgh Municipal and Police Act 1879 (42 & 43 Vict. c. cxxxii))
	Edinburgh.	
Statute Law Revision Act 1867	30 & 31 Vict. c. 59	15 July 1867
An Act for further promoting the Revision of the Statute Law by repealing certain Enactments which have ceased to be in force or have become unnecessary.
Textile Manufactures (Ireland) Act 1867 (repealed)	30 & 31 Vict. c. 60	15 July 1867
An Act to amend certain Acts relating to Linen, Hempen, and other Manufactures in Ireland. (Repealed by Statute Law Revision Act (Northern Ireland) 1954 (c. 35 (N.I.)))
Pier and Harbour Orders Confirmation Act 1867 (No. 3) or the Pier and Harbour Orders Confirmation (No. 3) Act 1867	30 & 31 Vict. c. 61	15 July 1867
An Act for confirming a Provisional Order made by the Board of Trade relating to the Construction of a Pier at Cleethorpes in the County of Lincoln.
	Cleethorpes Promenade Pier Order 1867 Order for the Construction Maintenance and Regulation of a Pier at Cleethorpes in the County of Lincoln.	
Test Abolition Act 1867 (repealed)	30 & 31 Vict. c. 62	25 July 1867
An Act to abolish a certain Declaration, commonly called the Declaration against Transubstantiation, the Invocation of the Saints, and the Sacrifice of the Mass, as practised in the Church of Rome; and to render it unnecessary to take, make, or subscribe the same as a Qualification for the Exercise or Enjoyment of any Civil Office, Franchise, or Right. (Repealed by Statute Law (Repeals) Act 1989 (c. 43))
Chatham and Sheerness Stipendiary Magistrate Act 1867 (repealed)	30 & 31 Vict. c. 63	25 July 1867
An Act for the Appointment of a Stipendiary Magistrate for Chatham and Sheerness in the County of Kent. (Repealed by Justices of the Peace Act 1949 (12, 13 & 14 Geo. 6. c. 101))
Court of Appeal in Chancery Act 1867 (repealed)	30 & 31 Vict. c. 64	25 July 1867
An Act to make further Provision the Despatch of Business in the Court of Appeal in Chancery. (Repealed by Statute Law Revision and Civil Procedure Act 1881 (44 & 45 Vict. c. 59) and Statute Law Revision and Civil Procedure Act 1883 (46 & 47 Vict. c. 49))
Local Government Supplemental Act 1867 (No. 2) or the Local Government Supplemental (No. 2) Act 1867	30 & 31 Vict. c. 65	25 July 1867
An Act to confirm certain Provisional Orders under "The Local Government Act, 1858," relating to the Districts of Sheffield, Derby, Sherborne, Royton, Bedford (Lancashire), Slough, Sandown, Burton-upon-Trent, West Cowes, and Accrington.
	Provisional Order putting in force the Lands Clauses Consolidation Act, 1845, within the District of the Sheffield Local Board, for the Purchase of Lands by the said Board for Street Improvements.	
	Provisional Order putting in force the Lands Clauses Consolidation Act, 1845, within the District of Derby in the County of Derby, for the Purchase of Lands by the Local Board of Health for the aforesaid District for Street Improvements.	
	Provisional Order putting in force the Lands Clauses Consolidation Act, 1845, within the District of Sherborne in the County of Dorset, for the Purchase of Lands by the Local Board of Health for Works for the Supply of Water to their District.	
	Provisional Order putting in force the Lands Clauses Consolidation Act, 1845, within the District of Royton in the County of Lancaster, for the Purchase of Lands in the aforesaid District for Street Improvements.	
	Provisional Order putting in force the Lands Clauses Consolidation Act, 1845, within the District of the Bedford (Lancashire) Local Board, for the Purchase of Lands by the said Board for Sewage Outfall Purposes.	
	Provisional Order putting in force the Lands Clauses Consolidation Act, 1845, within the District of the Slough Local Board, for the Purchase of Lands by the said Board for Works for flushing the Sewers within their District.	
	Provisional Order putting in force the Lands Clauses Consolidation Act, 1845, within the District of Sandown in the Isle of Wight, for the Purchase of Lands by the Local Board that District for Street Improvements.	
	Provisional Order for the Alteration of the Town of Burton-upon-Trent Act, 1853, (Note: Town of Burton-upon-Trent Act 1853 (16 & 17 Vict. c. cxviii)) in force within the District of the Burton-upon-Trent Local Board.	
	Provisional Order altering a Local Act (Note: Cowes Improvement and Market Act 1816 (56 Geo. 3. c. xxv)) in force the District of West Cowes.	
	Provisional Order for extending the Borrowing Powers of the Accrington Local Board of Health.	
Turnpike Trusts Arrangements Act 1867 (repealed)	30 & 31 Vict. c. 66	25 July 1867
An Act to confirm certain Provisional Orders made under an Act of the Fifteenth Year of Her present Majesty (Note: Turnpike Trusts (Making of Provisional Orders) Act 1851 (14 & 15 Vict. c. 38)) to facilitate Arrangements for the Relief of Turnpike Trusts. (Repealed by Statute Law (Repeals) Act 1981 (c. 19))
Local Government Supplemental Act 1867 (No. 4) or the Local Government Supplemental (No. 4) Act	30 & 31 Vict. c. 67	25 July 1867
An Act to confirm certain Provisional Orders under "The Local Government Act, 1858," relating to the Districts of Oswaldtwistle, Devizes, Layton-with-Warbrick (Blackpool), and Harrogate, and for other Purposes relative to certain Districts under the said Act.
	Provisional Order for extending the Borrowing Powers of the Oswaldtwistle Local Board.	
	Provisional Order repealing and altering Parts of a Local Act (Note: Devizes Improvement Act 1825 (6 Geo. 4. c. clxii)) in force within the District of the Devizes Local Board.	
	Provisional Order repealing and altering a Local Act (Note: Blackpool Improvement Act 1865 (28 & 29 Vict. c. ccxiv)) in force within the District of the Local Board of Health in and for the District of Layton-with-Warbrick (Blackpool), Lancashire.	
	Provisional Order putting in force the Lands Clauses Consolidation Act, 1845, within the Harrogate District for the Purchase and taking of Lands otherwise than by Agreement.	
Common Law Chambers Act 1867 (repealed)	30 & 31 Vict. c. 68	25 July 1867
An Act to provide for the better Despatch of Business in the Chambers of the Judges of the Superior Courts of Common Law. (Repealed by Statute Law Revision and Civil Procedure Act 1881 (44 & 45 Vict. c. 59))
Real Estate Charges Act 1867 (repealed)	30 & 31 Vict. c. 69	25 July 1867
An Act to explain the Operation of an Act passed in the Seventeenth and Eighteenth Years of Her present Majesty, Chapter One hundred and thirteen, intituled "An Act to amend the Law relating to the Administration of deceased Persons." (Note: Real Estate Charges Act 1854 (17 & 18 Vict.. c. 113)) (Repealed for England and Wales by Administration of Estates Act 1925 (15 & 16 Geo. 5. c. 23) and for Northern Ireland by Administration of Estates Act (Northern Ireland) 1955 (c. 24 (N.I.)))
Public Records (Ireland) Act 1867 (repealed)	30 & 31 Vict. c. 70	12 August 1867
An Act to provide for keeping safely the Public Records of Ireland. (Repealed by Statute Law Revision Act 1893 (56 & 57 Vict. c. 14) and Statute Law Revision Act 1953 (2 & 3 Eliz. 2. c. 5))
Second Annual Inclosure Act 1867	30 & 31 Vict. c. 71	12 August 1867
An Act to authorize the Inclosure of certain Lands in pursuance of a Special Report of the Inclosure Commissioners for England and Wales.
Board of Trade (Parliamentary Secretary) Act 1867 (repealed)	30 & 31 Vict. c. 72	12 August 1867
An Act for abolishing the Office of Vice President of the Board of Trade and substituting a Secretary with a Seat in Parliament. (Repealed by Ministers of the Crown Act 1937 (1 Edw. 8 & 1 Geo. 6. c. 38))
Pier and Harbour Orders Confirmation Act 1867 (No. 2) or the Pier and Harbour Orders Confirmation (No. 2) Act 1867	30 & 31 Vict. c. 73	12 August 1867
An Act for confirming certain Provisional Orders made by the Board of Trade under The General Pier and Harbour Act, 1861, relating to Bray and Irvine.
	Bray Promenade Pier Order 1867 Order for the Construction Maintenance and Regulation of a Pier at Bray in the County of Wicklow.	
	Irvine Harbour Improvement Order 1867 Order for the Management and Improvement of the Harbour of Irvine in the County of Ayr.	
Trades Union Commission Act Extension Act 1867 (repealed)	30 & 31 Vict. c. 74	12 August 1867
An Act to extend the "Trades Union Commission Act, 1867." (Note: Trades Union Commission Act 1867 (30 & 31 Vict. c. 8)) (Repealed by Statute Law Revision Act 1875 (38 & 39 Vict. c. 66))
Office and Oath Act 1867 (repealed)	30 & 31 Vict. c. 75	12 August 1867
An Act to remove certain Religious Disabilities affecting some of Her Majesty's Subjects, and to amend the Law relating to Oaths of Office (Repealed by Statute Law (Repeals) Act 1978 (c. 45))
Christ Church, Oxford Act 1867	30 & 31 Vict. c. 76	12 August 1867
An Act to repeal certain Ordinances made for the Cathedral or House of Christ Church in Oxford by the Commissioners appointed under the Oxford University Act, 1854, (Note: Oxford University Act 1854 (17 & 18 Vict. c. 81)) and to substitute a new Ordinance in lieu thereof.
Wexford Grand Jury Act 1867	30 & 31 Vict. c. 77	12 August 1867
An Act to validate certain Proceedings of the Grand Jury of the County of Wexford.
Tyne Pilotage Amendment Act 1867 (repealed)	30 & 31 Vict. c. 78	12 August 1867
An Act to amend the Tyne Pilotage Order Confirmation Act, 1865. (Note: (Tyne) Pilotage Order Confirmation Act 1865 (28 & 29 Vict. c. 44)) (Repealed by Pilotage Orders Confirmation (No. 2) Act 1922 (12 & 13 Geo. 5. c. xiii))
General Police and Improvement (Scotland) Supplemental Act 1867 or the General Police and Improvement (Scotland) Act 1867 or the Dundee Provisional Order Confirmation Act 1867 or the Dundee Provisional Orders Confirmation Act 1867 (repealed)	30 & 31 Vict. c. 79	12 August 1867
An Act to confirm certain Provisional Orders under "The General Police and Improvement (Scotland) Act, 1862," relating to the Burgh of Dundee. (Repealed by Statute Law (Repeals) Act 1977 (c. 18))
	Dundee.	
	Dundee.	
Valuation of Lands (Scotland) Amendment Act 1867 (repealed)	30 & 31 Vict. c. 80	12 August 1867
An Act to define the Duties of the Assessor of Railways in Scotland in making up the Valuation Roll of Railways, and to amend in certain respects the Valuation of Lands (Scotland) Acts. (Repealed by Local Government and Rating Act 1997 (c. 29))
Prorogation Act 1867	30 & 31 Vict. c. 81	12 August 1867
An Act to simplify the Forms of Prorogation during the Recess of Parliament.
Customs Amendment Act 1867 or the Customs Revenue Act 1867 or the Customs Act 1867 (repealed)	30 & 31 Vict. c. 82	12 August 1867
An Act to alter certain Duties, and to amend the Laws relating to the Customs. (Repealed by Customs Consolidation Act 1876 (39 & 40 Vict. c. 36))
Local Government Supplemental Act 1867 (No. 5) or the Local Government Supplemental (No. 5) Act 1867	30 & 31 Vict. c. 83	12 August 1867
An Act to confirm certain Provisional Orders under "The Local Government Act, 1858," relating to the Districts of Ramsgate, Tunbridge Wells, Bognor, Newport, Chesterfield, Malvern, Great Harwood, and Harrow; and for other Purposes relating to certain Districts under that Act.
	Provisional Order altering a Local Act (Note: Ramsgate Improvement Act 1838 (1 & 2 Vict. c. lxx)) in force within the District of the Local Board in and for the District of Ramsgate in the County of Kent.	
	Provisional Order partially repealing and altering Part of the Tunbridge Wells Water Act, 1865, (Note: Tunbridge Wells Water Act 1865 (28 & 29 Vict. c. cciv)) in force within the District of the Board of Tunbridge Wells Improvement Commissioners.	
	Provisional Order partially repealing and altering Parts of Local Acts in force within the District of the Bognor Local Board.	
	Provisional Order repealing a Local Act (Note: Newport, Isle of Wight (Improvement) Act 1786 (26 Geo. 3. c. 119)) in force within the District of the Newport Local Board.	
	Provisional Order repealing a Local Act (Note: Chesterfield Lighting Act 1825 (6 Geo. 4. c. lxxvii)) in force within the District of the Chesterfield Local Board.	
	Provisional Order in pursuance of Section 77 of the Local Government Act, 1858, for repealing Parts of and amending the Malvern Local Acts, and vesting in the Local Board the Property and Powers of the Commissioners under those Acts.	
	Provisional Order for extending the Borrowing Powers of the Great Harwood Local Board.	
	Provisional Order putting in force the Lands Clauses Consolidation Act, 1845, within the Harrow Local Board of Health District, for the Purchase and taking of Lands by the said Board otherwise than by Agreement for purposes of Sewage Irrigation.	
Vaccination Act 1867 (repealed)	30 & 31 Vict. c. 84	12 August 1867
An Act to consolidate and amend the Laws relating to Vaccination. (Repealed by National Health Service Act 1946 (9 & 10 Geo. 6. c. 81))
Galashiels Act 1867 (repealed)	30 & 31 Vict. c. 85	12 August 1867
An Act to include the whole of the Burgh of Galashiels within the County Sheriffdom and Commissariot of Selkirk. (Repealed by Statute Law (Repeals) Act 1977 (c. 18))
Isle of Man Customs Duties Act 1867 (repealed)	30 & 31 Vict. c. 86	12 August 1867
An Act to alter certain Duties of Customs in the Isle of Man. (Repealed by Customs (Isle of Man) Tariff Act 1874 (37 & 38 Vict. c. 46))
Court of Chancery (Officers) Act 1867 (repealed)	30 & 31 Vict. c. 87	12 August 1867
An Act to facilitate the Transaction of Business in the Chambers of the Judges of the High Court of Chancery, and in the Offices of the Registrars and Accountant General of the said Court, and in Lunacy. (Repealed by Administration of Justice Act 1925 (15 & 16 Geo. 5. c. 28))
Indemnity Act 1867 (repealed)	30 & 31 Vict. c. 88	12 August 1867
An Act to indemnify such Persons in the United Kingdom as have omitted to qualify themselves for Offices and Employments, and to extend the Time limited for those Purposes respectively. (Repealed by Promissory Oaths Act 1871 (34 & 35 Vict. c. 48))
Stamp Duty Composition (Ireland) Act 1867 (repealed)	30 & 31 Vict. c. 89	12 August 1867
An Act to render perpetual an Act passed in the Session holden in the Twenty-seventh and Twenty-eighth Years of Her present Majesty, intituled "An Act to permit for a limited Period Compositions for Stamp Duty on Bank Post Bills of Five Pounds and upwards in Ireland." (Note: Bank Post Bills Composition (Ireland) Act 1864 (27 & 28 Vict. c. 86)) (Repealed by Statute Law Revision Act 1893 (56 & 57 Vict. c. 14))
Revenue Act 1867 (repealed)	30 & 31 Vict. c. 90	12 August 1867
An Act to alter certain Duties and to amend the Laws relating to the Inland Revenue. (Repealed by Statute Law (Repeals) Act 1977 (c. 18))
Dominica Loan Act 1867 (repealed)	30 & 31 Vict. c. 91	12 August 1867
An Act to authorize an Alteration in the Mode of Repayment of a Loan made by the West India Relief Com missioners to the Island of Dominica. (Repealed by West India Loan Act 1879 (42 & 43 Vict. c. 16))
Militia Pay Act 1867 (repealed)	30 & 31 Vict. c. 92	12 August 1867
An Act to defray the Charge of the Pay, Clothing, and contingent and other Expenses of the Disembodied Militia in Great Britain and Ireland; grant Allowances in certain Cases to Subaltern Officers, Adjutants, Paymasters, Quartermasters, Surgeons, Assistant Surgeons, and Surgeons Mates of the Militia; and to authorize the Employment of the Non-commissioned Officers. (Repealed by Statute Law Revision Act 1875 (38 & 39 Vict. c. 66))
Morro Velho Marriage Act 1867 (repealed)	30 & 31 Vict. c. 93	12 August 1867
An Act to legalize certain Marriages solemnized at Morro Velho in Brazil. (Repealed by Foreign Marriage (Amendment) Act 1988 (c. 44))
Weights and Measures, Dublin Act 1867 (repealed)	30 & 31 Vict. c. 94	12 August 1867
An Act to provide for the Inspection of Weights and Measures, and to regulate the Law relating thereto in certain Parts of the Police District of Dublin Metropolis. (Repealed by Weights and Measures Act 1878 (41 & 42 Vict. c. 49))
Dublin Police Act 1867 (repealed)	30 & 31 Vict. c. 95	12 August 1867
An Act to amend the Laws regulating the Superannuation Allowances of the Dublin Metropolitan Police. (Repealed by Statute Law (Repeals) Act 2013 (c. 2))
Debts Recovery (Scotland) Act 1867 (repealed)	30 & 31 Vict. c. 96	12 August 1867
An Act to facilitate the Recovery of certain Debts in the Sheriff Courts in Scotland. (Repealed by Sheriff Courts (Scotland) Act 1907 (7 Edw. 7. c. 51))
Trusts (Scotland) Act 1867 (repealed)	30 & 31 Vict. c. 97	12 August 1867
An Act to facilitate the Administration of Trusts in Scotland. (Repealed by Trusts (Scotland) Act 1921 (11 & 12 Geo. 5. c. 58))
Patriotic Fund Act 1867 (repealed)	30 & 31 Vict. c. 98	12 August 1867
An Act to make better Provision for the Administration of the Patriotic Fund. (Repealed by Patriotic Fund Reorganisation Act 1903 (3 Edw. 7. c. 20))
Sir John Port's Charity, Repton Act 1867	30 & 31 Vict. c. 99	12 August 1867
An Act for confirming an amended Scheme of the Charity Commissioners for the Charity called Sir John Port's Hospital in Etwall and School in Repton in the County of Derby.
Naval Knights of Windsor Act 1867 (repealed)	30 & 31 Vict. c. 100	15 August 1867
An Act to make further Provision respecting the Naval Knights of Windsor. (Repealed by Naval Knights of Windsor (Dissolution) Act 1892 (55 & 56 Vict. c. 34))
Public Health (Scotland) Act 1867 (repealed)	30 & 31 Vict. c. 101	15 August 1867
An Act to consolidate and amend the Law relating to the Public Health in Scotland. (Repealed by Public Health (Scotland) Act 1897 (60 & 61 Vict. c. 38))
Representation of the People Act 1867 or the Reform Act 1867 or the Second Reform Act	30 & 31 Vict. c. 102	15 August 1867
An Act further to amend the Laws relating to the Representation of the People in England and Wales.
Factory Acts Extension Act 1867 (repealed)	30 & 31 Vict. c. 103	15 August 1867
An Act for the Extension of the Factory Acts. (Repealed by Factory and Workshop Act 1878 (41 & 42 Vict. c. 16))
Railways (Ireland) Act 1867 (repealed)	30 & 31 Vict. c. 104	15 August 1867
An Act to amend and extend as to Railways in Ireland the Provisions of an Act of the Seventh and Eighth Years of Victoria, intituled "An Act to attach certain Conditions to the Construction of future Railways authorized or to be authorized by any Act of the present or succeeding Sessions of Parliament; and for other Purposes in relation to Railways." (Note: Railway Regulation Act 1844 (7 & 8 Vict. c. 85)) (Repealed by Public Works &c Loans Act (Northern Ireland) 1953 (c. 13 (N.I.)))
Councils of Conciliation Act 1867 (repealed)	30 & 31 Vict. c. 105	15 August 1867
An Act to establish Equitable Councils of Conciliation to adjust Differences between Masters and Workmen. (Repealed by Conciliation Act 1896 (59 & 60 Vict. c. 30))
Poor Law Amendment Act 1867 (repealed)	30 & 31 Vict. c. 106	20 August 1867
An Act to make the Poor Law Board permanent, and to provide sundry Amendments in the Laws for the Relief of the Poor. (Repealed by Statute Law Revision Act 1893 (56 & 57 Vict. c. 14), Poor Law Act 1927 (17 & 18 Geo. 5. c. 14), Local Government Act 1929 (19 & 20 Geo. 5. c. 17), Local Government Act 1933 (23 & 24 Geo. 5. c. 51), Fire Brigades Act 1938 (1 & 2 Geo. 6. c. 72), National Health Service Act 1946 (9 & 10 Geo. 6. c. 81) and Statute Law Revision Act 1950 (14 Geo. 6. c. 6))
Reduction of Annuity Tax Act 1867	30 & 31 Vict. c. 107	20 August 1867
An Act to uncollegiate the Parish Canongate within the Parliamentary Burgh of Edinburgh, to reduce the Amount of the Annuity Tax within the said Parish, and to make Provision for the Maintenance of Two Ministers therein.
Guarantee by Companies Act 1867 (repealed)	30 & 31 Vict. c. 108	20 August 1867
An Act to provide for the Guarantee of Persons holding Situations of Trust under Government by Companies, Societies, or Associations. (Repealed by Government Officers (Security) Act 1875 (38 & 39 Vict. c. 64))
Windsor Barracks Act 1867 or Barrack Lane, Windsor Act 1867 (repealed)	30 & 31 Vict. c. 109	20 August 1867
An Act for extinguishing certain Rights of Way over and along Barrack Lane in the Borough of New Windsor in the County of Berks. (Repealed by Statute Law (Repeals) Act 1993 (c. 50))
Reserve Force Act 1867 (repealed)	30 & 31 Vict. c. 110	20 August 1867
An Act to consolidate and amend the Acts for rendering effective the Service of Chelsea and Naval Out-Pensioners and Pensioners of the East India Company, and for establishing a Reserve Force of Men who have been in Her Majesty's Service. (Repealed by Reserve Forces Act 1882 (45 & 46 Vict. c. 48))
Militia Reserve Act 1867 (repealed)	30 & 31 Vict. c. 111	20 August 1867
An Act to form a Reserve of Men in the Militia to join Her Majesty's Army in the event of War. (Repealed by Reserve Forces Act 1882 (45 & 46 Vict. c. 48))
Public Works (Ireland) Act 1867 (repealed)	30 & 31 Vict. c. 112	20 August 1867
An Act to provide further Facilities for the Repair of Roads, Bridges, and other Public Works in Ireland in case of sudden Damage. (Repealed by Local Government (Ireland) Act 1898 (61 & 62 Vict. c. 37))
Sewage Utilization Act 1867	30 & 31 Vict. c. 113	20 August 1867
An Act for facilitating the Distribution of Sewage Matter over Land, and otherwise amending the Law relating to Sewer Authorities. (Repealed for England and Wales by Public Health Act 1875 (38 & 39 Vict. c. 55) and for Ireland by Public Health (Ireland) Act 1878 (41 & 42 Vict. c. 52))
Court of Admiralty (Ireland) Act 1867 (repealed)	30 & 31 Vict. c. 114	20 August 1867
An Act to extend the Jurisdiction, alter and amend the Procedure and Practice, and to regulate the Establishment, of the Court of Admiralty in Ireland. (Repealed by Judicature (Northern Ireland) Act 1978 (c. 23))
Justices of the Peace Act 1867 (repealed)	30 & 31 Vict. c. 115	20 August 1867
An Act to remove Disqualifications Justices of the Peace in certain Cases. (Repealed by Courts Act 1971 (c. 23))
Dogs (Ireland) Act 1867 (repealed)	30 & 31 Vict. c. 116	20 August 1867
An Act to amend the Act of the Twenty eighth and Twenty ninth Victoria Chapter Fifty, (Note: Dogs Regulation (Ireland) Act 1865 (28 & 29 Vict. c. 50)) for regulating the keeping of Dogs, and for the Protection of Sheep and other Property from Dogs in Ireland. (Repealed by Statute Law Revision Act 1893 (56 & 57 Vict. c. 14) and Administration of Justice Act (Northern Ireland) 1954 (c. 9 (N.I.)))
Industrial and Provident Societies Act 1867 (repealed)	30 & 31 Vict. c. 117	20 August 1867
An Act to amend the Industrial and Provident Societies Acts. (Repealed by Industrial and Provident Societies Act 1876 (39 & 40 Vict. c. 45))
Lunacy (Ireland) Act 1867 (repealed)	30 & 31 Vict. c. 118	20 August 1867
An Act to provide for the Appointment of the Officers and Servants of District Lunatic Asylums in Ireland, and to alter and amend the Law relating to the Custody of dangerous Lunatics and dangerous Idiots in Ireland. (Repealed by Statute Law Revision Act 1893 (56 & 57 Vict. c. 14), Local Government (Ireland) Act 1898 (61 & 62 Vict. c. 37), Asylums Officers' Superannuation Act 1909 (9 Edw. 7. c. 48) and Mental Treatment Act (Northern Ireland) 1932 (22 & 23 Geo. 5. c. 15 (N.I.)))
Naval Stores Act 1867 (repealed)	30 & 31 Vict. c. 119	20 August 1867
An Act for the Protection of Naval Stores. (Repealed by Naval Stores Act 1869 (32 & 33 Vict. c. 12))
Appropriation Act 1867 (repealed)	30 & 31 Vict. c. 120	20 August 1867
An Act to apply a Sum out of the Consolidated Fund and the Surplus of Ways and Means to the Service of the Year ending the Thirty-first Day of March One thousand eight hundred and sixty-eight, and to appropriate the Supplies granted in this Session of Parliament. (Repealed by Statute Law Revision Act 1875 (38 & 39 Vict. c. 66))
Annual Turnpike Acts Continuance Act 1867 (repealed)	30 & 31 Vict. c. 121	20 August 1867
An Act to continue certain Turnpike Acts in Great Britain, to repeal certain other Turnpike Acts, and to make further Provisions concerning Turnpike Roads. (Repealed by Statute Law (Repeals) Act 1981 (c. 19))
Courts of Law Fees Act 1867 (repealed)	30 & 31 Vict. c. 122	20 August 1867
An Act for the Application of surplus Fees paid by Suitors in the Superior Courts of Law and other Courts towards the Expenses of providing the intended Courts of Justice; and for other Purposes. (Repealed by Administration of Justice Act 1965 (c. 2))
Local Government Supplemental Act 1867 (No. 6) or the Local Government Supplemental (No. 6) Act 1867	30 & 31 Vict. c. 123	20 August 1867
An Act to confirm certain Provisional Orders under "The Local Government Act, 1858" relating to the Districts of Exeter, Devonport, Reading, Warley, and Midgley, and for other Purposes relative to certain Districts under the said Act.
	Provisional Order repealing and altering Parts of a Local Act in force within the District of the Exeter Local Board.	
	Provisional Order repealing and altering Parts of a Local Act in force within the District of the Devonport Local Board.	
	Provisional Order putting in force the Lands Clauses Consolidation Act, 1845, within the Reading Local Board of Health District, for the purchase and taking of Lands by the said Board, otherwise than by Agreement, for Street and Road Improvements.	
	Provisional Order for Separation from the District of Warley, in the County of York, of a Portion of the said District, under the Local Government Act, 1858.	
	Provisional Order for altering the Boundaries of the District of Midgley in the County of York.	
Merchant Shipping Act 1867 (repealed)	30 & 31 Vict. c. 124	20 August 1867
An Act to amend The Merchant Shipping Act, 1854. (Note: Merchant Shipping Act 1854 (17 & 18 Vict. c. 104)) (Repealed by Justices of the Peace Act 1949 (12, 13 & 14 Geo. 6. c. 101))
Contagious Diseases (Animals) Act 1867 (repealed)	30 & 31 Vict. c. 125	20 August 1867
An Act to continue and amend the Acts relating to Contagious or Infectious Diseases among Cattle and other Animals. (Repealed by Contagious Diseases (Animals) Act 1869 (32 & 33 Vict. c. 70))
Railway Companies (Scotland) Act 1867	30 & 31 Vict. c. 126	20 August 1867
An Act to amend the Law relating to Railway Companies in Scotland.
Railway Companies Act 1867	30 & 31 Vict. c. 127	20 August 1867
An Act to amend the Law relating to Railway Companies.
War Department Stores Act 1867 (repealed)	30 & 31 Vict. c. 128	20 August 1867
An Act for the Protection of War Department Stores. (Repealed by Public Stores Act 1875 (38 & 39 Vict. c. 25), Crown Proceedings Act 1947 (10 & 11 Geo. 6. c. 44), Northern Ireland (Crown Proceedings) Order 1949 (SI 1949/1836) and Statute Law Revision Act 1950 (14 Geo. 6. c. 6))
Chancery and Common Law Offices (Ireland) Act 1867 (repealed)	30 & 31 Vict. c. 129	20 August 1867
An Act to alter and regulate the Official Establishment of the High Court of Chancery and of the Superior Courts of Common Law in Ireland. (Repealed by Judicature (Northern Ireland) Act 1978 (c. 23))
Agricultural Gangs Act 1867 (repealed)	30 & 31 Vict. c. 130	20 August 1867
An Act for the Regulation of Agricultural Gangs. (Repealed by Local Government Act 1966 (c. 42))
Companies Act 1867 (repealed)	30 & 31 Vict. c. 131	20 August 1867
An Act to amend "The Companies Act, 1862." (Repealed by Companies (Consolidation) Act 1908 (8 Edw. 7. c. 69))
Investments of Trust Funds Act 1867 (repealed)	30 & 31 Vict. c. 132	20 August 1867
An Act to remove Doubts as to the Power of Trustees, Executors, and Administrators to invest Trust Funds in certain Securities and to declare and amend the Law relating to such Investments. (Repealed by Trust Investment Act 1889 (52 & 53 Vict. c. 32))
Consecration of Churchyards Act 1867	30 & 31 Vict. c. 133	20 August 1867
An Act relating to the Consecration of Churchyards.
Metropolitan Streets Act 1867	30 & 31 Vict. c. 134	20 August 1867
An Act for regulating the Traffic in the Metropolis, and for making Provision for the greater Security of Persons passing through the Streets, and for other Purposes.
Ecclesiastical Fees Act 1867 (repealed)	30 & 31 Vict. c. 135	20 August 1867
An Act for the Establishment of a Table of Fees to be taken on the Consecration of Churches, Chapels, and Burial Grounds, on the Ordination of Deacons and Priests, and Visitations. (Repealed by Ecclesiastical Fees Measure 1962 (No. 1))
Parliamentary Costs Act 1867 (repealed)	30 & 31 Vict. c. 136	20 August 1867
An Act to enable the Courts of Referees to administer Oaths and award Costs in certain Cases, in the same Manner as Committees on Private Bills. (Repealed by Statute Law (Repeals) Act 1993 (c. 50) and Parliamentary Costs Act 2006 (c. 37))
Church Temporalities (Ireland) Act 1867	30 & 31 Vict. c. 137	20 August 1867
An Act to validate certain Orders made by the Lord Lieutenant in Council under the Church Temporalities Acts in Ireland, and to increase the Stipends payable by the Ecclesiastical Commissioners for Ireland to certain Incumbents in Ireland.
Railway Companies (Ireland) Temporary Advances Act 1867 (repealed)	30 & 31 Vict. c. 138	20 August 1867
An Act to authorize the Extension of the Period for Repayment of Advances made under The Railway Companies (Ireland) Temporary Advances Act, 1866. (Note: Railway Companies (Ireland) Temporary Advances Act 1866 (29 & 30 Vict. c. 95)) (Repealed by Statute Law Revision Act 1875 (38 & 39 Vict. c. 66))
Drainage and Improvement of Lands Supplemental Act (Ireland) (No. 2) 1867 or the Drainage and Improvement of Lands Supplemental Act (Ireland) 1867 or the Drainage and Improvement of Lands Supplemental (Ireland) (No. 2) Act 1867	30 & 31 Vict. c. 139	20 August 1867
An Act to confirm Provisional Orders for the Quinagh and Parsonstown Drainage Districts respectively.
	In the Matter of Quinagh Drainage District in the County of Carlow.	
	In the Matter of Parsonstown Drainage District in the County of Tipperary and King's County.	
Royal Military Canal Act 1867	30 & 31 Vict. c. 140	20 August 1867
An Act to authorize a Sale or Lease of the Royal Military Canal and its collateral Works; and for other Purposes.
Master and Servant Act 1867 (repealed)	30 & 31 Vict. c. 141	20 August 1867
An Act to amend the Statute Law as between Master and Servant. (Repealed by Conspiracy and Protection of Property Act 1875 (38 & 39 Vict. c. 86))
County Courts Act 1867 (repealed)	30 & 31 Vict. c. 142	20 August 1867
An Act to amend the Acts relating to the Jurisdiction of the County Courts. (Repealed by County Courts Act 1888 (51 & 52 Vict. c. 43))
Expiring Laws Continuance Act 1867 (repealed)	30 & 31 Vict. c. 143	20 August 1867
An Act to continue various expiring Laws. (Repealed by Statute Law Revision Act 1875 (38 & 39 Vict. c. 66))
Policies of Assurance Act 1867	30 & 31 Vict. c. 144	20 August 1867
An Act to enable Assignees of Policies of Life Assurance to sue thereon in their own Names.
Expenses of Fortifications for Protecting Royal Arsenals (No. 2) Act 1867 (repealed)	30 & 31 Vict. c. 145	21 August 1867
An Act for providing a further Sum towards defraying the Expenses of constructing Fortifications for the Protection of the Royal Arsenals and Dockyards and the Ports of Dover and Portland. (Repealed by Revenue, Friendly Societies, and National Debt Act 1882 (45 & 46 Vict. c. 72))
Workshop Regulation Act 1867 or the Hours of Labour Regulation Act 1867 (repealed)	30 & 31 Vict. c. 146	21 August 1867
An Act for regulating the Hours of Labour for Children, Young Persons, and Women employed in Workshops; and for other Purposes relating thereto. (Repealed by Factory and Workshop Act 1878 (41 & 42 Vict. c. 16))

=== Local and personal acts ===
Short title	Citation	Royal assent
Long title
City of London Municipal Elections Amendment Act 1867	30 & 31 Vict. c. i	5 April 1867
An Act to amend an Act passed in the Thirteenth Year of Her Majesty's Reign, (Note: City of London Elections Act 1849 (12 & 13 Vict. c. xciv)) intituled "An Act to amend an Act passed in the Eleventh Year of the Reign of King George the First, (Note: City of London Elections Act 1724 (11 Geo. 1. c. 18)) for regulating Elections within the City of London, and for preserving the Peace, good Order, and Government of the said City."
Windsor Royal Gas Act 1867	30 & 31 Vict. c. ii	5 April 1867
An Act for more effectually lighting New Windsor and its Neighbourhood with Gas.
Blackfriars and Southwark Bridge Act 1867	30 & 31 Vict. c. iii	5 April 1867
An Act to enable the Mayor and Commonality and Citizens of the City of London to borrow a further Sum of Money on the Security of the Bridge House Estates, to complete the rebuilding of Blackfriars Bridge, and for the Purchase of Southwark Bridge; and for other purposes.
Manchester, Sheffield and Lincolnshire Railway (Additional Powers) Act 1867	30 & 31 Vict. c. iv	5 April 1867
An Act for conferring Powers on the Manchester, Sheffield, and Lincolnshire Railway Company with respect to the Construction and Abandonment of Works, and in relation to their Capital; and for conferring other Powers on that Company and on the South Yorkshire Railway Company in relation to the Trent, Ancholme, and Grimsby Railway; and for other Purposes.
Southwark and Vauxhall Water Act 1867	30 & 31 Vict. c. v	12 April 1867
An Act to empower the Southwark and Vauxhall Water Company to raise further Money; to acquire additional Land; and for other Purposes.
Milford Haven Dock and Railway Amendment Act 1867	30 & 31 Vict. c. vi	12 April 1867
An Act to extend the Time limited for completing the Works of the Milford Haven Dock and Railway Company; and for other Purposes.
St. Mary Magdalene Hospital, Newcastle-upon-Tyne Act 1867 or the Saint Mary Magdalene Hospital Act 1867 (repealed)	30 & 31 Vict. c. vii	12 April 1867
An Act providing for the Management, Improvement, and better Government, and for extending the Objects and regulating the Appropriation of the Income, of the Hospital of Saint Mary Magdalene in the Town and County of Newcastle-upon-Tyne. (Repealed by Tyne and Wear Act 1980 (c. xliii))
South Eastern Railway (Capital) Act 1867	30 & 31 Vict. c. viii	12 April 1867
An Act for regulating the Capital and Debt of the South-eastern Railway Company, and for other Purposes, and of which the Short Title is "South-eastern Railway Capital Act, 1867."
Northumberland Central Railway Act 1867	30 & 31 Vict. c. ix	12 April 1867
An Act to authorize the Northumberland Central Railway Company to abandon a Portion of their authorized Line; and for other Purposes.
Nottingham Improvement Act 1867 (repealed)	30 & 31 Vict. c. x	12 April 1867
An Act for the Improvement of Roads, Sewers, and other Works in the Parish of Saint Mary in the Borough of Nottingham; and for other Purposes. (Repealed by Statute Law (Repeals) Act 1995 (c. 44))
Scarborough Gas Act 1867 (repealed)	30 & 31 Vict. c. xi	12 April 1867
An Act to enable "the Scarborough Gas Company" to raise a further Sum of Money; and for other Purposes. (Repealed by Scarborough Gas (Consolidation) Act 1927 (17 & 18 Geo. 5. c. xcv))
Sutton, Southcoates and Drypool Gas Act 1867 (repealed)	30 & 31 Vict. c. xii	12 April 1867
An Act to incorporate "The Sutton, Southcoates, and Drypool Gaslight Company (Limited,)" by the Name of "The Sutton, Southcoates, and Drypool Gas Company," and to make further Provision for lighting with Gas the District now lighted by the Company and adjoining Places in the Borough of Kingston-upon-Hull and in the East Riding of the County of York; to authorize the raising of additional Capital; and for other Purposes. (Repealed by East Hull Gas Act 1933 (23 & 24 Geo. 5. c. lxxxv))
Kidderminster Gas Act 1867	30 & 31 Vict. c. xiii	12 April 1867
An Act for better lighting with Gas the Borough of Kidderminster, and certain Parishes and Places adjacent thereto, in the County of Worcester.
Metropolitan Life Assurance Society Act 1867	30 & 31 Vict. c. xiv	12 April 1867
An Act to make Alterations in the Deed of Settlement of the Metropolitan Life Assurance Society.
Barnsley Gas Act 1867	30 & 31 Vict. c. xv	3 May 1867
An Act for extending the Limits of "The Barnsley Gas Act, 1852," (Note: Barnsley Gas Act 1852 (15 & 16 Vict. c. viii)) and for authorizing the Barnsley Gas Company to construct new Works and raise more Money; and for other Purposes.
Garstang and Knot End Railway Act 1867	30 & 31 Vict. c. xvi	3 May 1867
An Act to extend the Time for the Completion of Works authorized by the Garstang and Knot End Railway Act, 1864. (Note: Garstang and Knot End Railway Act 1864 (27 & 28 Vict. c. cxlix))
Stratford-upon-Avon Gas Act 1867 (repealed)	30 & 31 Vict. c. xvii	3 May 1867
An Act to authorize the Stratford-upon-Avon Gas Company to raise further Capital; and for other Purposes. (Repealed by Statute Law (Repeals) Act 1995 (c. 44))
Barking Gas Act 1867	30 & 31 Vict. c. xviii	3 May 1867
An Act to incorporate a Company for better supplying with Gas the Town and Parish of Barking, except that Part of it known as Great Ilford Ward, and the Parish of Dagenham in the County of Essex, and the Neighbourhood thereof; and for other Purposes.
Exmouth Market Act 1867	30 & 31 Vict. c. xix	3 May 1867
An Act for the better Regulation of the Market at Exmouth in the County of Devon, and for other Purposes, and of which the Short Title is "Exmouth Market Act, 1867."
Fisherton Anger and Bemerton Waterworks Act 1867 (repealed)	30 & 31 Vict. c. xx	3 May 1867
An Act for better supplying with Water Part of the Parish of Fisherton Anger and the Tything of Bemerton in the County of Wilts. (Repealed by New Sarum and Salisbury and Wilton Water Order 1951 (SI 1951/2215))
Paignton Water Act 1867	30 & 31 Vict. c. xxi	31 May 1867
An Act for better supplying with Water the Parish of Paignton in the County of Devon.
Brighton Pavilion Act 1867 (repealed)	30 & 31 Vict. c. xxii	31 May 1867
An Act to authorize the Mayor, Aldermen, and Burgesses of the Town of Brighton to borrow further Sums of Money for improving the Pavilion Estate, and for other Purposes. (Repealed by Brighton Corporation Act 1931 (21 & 22 Geo. 5. c. cix))
Worcester Prison Act 1867 (repealed)	30 & 31 Vict. c. xxiii	31 May 1867
An Act for the Union of the Prisons of the County of Worcester and of the City and County of the City of Worcester; and for other Purposes. (Repealed by Statute Law (Repeals) Act 1998 (c. 43))
South Shields Gas Act 1867 (repealed)	30 & 31 Vict. c. xxiv	31 May 1867
An Act for authorizing the South Shields Gas Company to extend their Works and increase their Capital; and for other Purposes. (Repealed by Newcastle-upon-Tyne and Gateshead Gas Order 1937 (SR&O 1937/1186))
Hull Docks Act 1867	30 & 31 Vict. c. xxv	31 May 1867
An Act to authorize the Dock Company at Kingston-upon-Hull further to enlarge the Works connected with the Western Dock; and to acquire additional Lands in connexion with such Dock; and for other Purposes.
Bishop Wearmouth Rectory Act 1867	30 & 31 Vict. c. xxvi	31 May 1867
An Act for vesting the Glebe Lands and Endowments of the Rectory of Bishop Wearmouth in the County and Diocese of Durham in the Ecclesiastical Commissioners for England, and for making Provision for the Endowment of the said Rectory in lieu thereof; and for the Promotion of other Ecclesiastical Purposes connected therewith.
Midland Railway (Derby Gas) Act 1867	30 & 31 Vict. c. xxvii	31 May 1867
An Act for authorizing the Acquisition by the Midland Railway Company of Land and Property of the Derby Gaslight and Coke Company, and the Sale by the Midland Railway Company to the Derby Gaslight and Coke Company of other Lands, and for the Erection of Gasworks thereon; and for other Purposes.
Atlantic Telegraph Amendment Act 1867	30 & 31 Vict. c. xxviii	31 May 1867
An Act to alter and amend the Acts relating to the Atlantic Telegraph Company; to enable the Company to raise additional Capital; to extend their Borrowing Powers and for other Purposes.
Stalybridge Gas Act 1867	30 & 31 Vict. c. xxix	31 May 1867
An Act for authorizing the Stalybridge Gas Company to extend their Works and increase their Capital; and for other Purposes.
Newcastle-upon-Tyne and Gateshead Gas Act 1867	30 & 31 Vict. c. xxx	31 May 1867
An Act for enabling the Newcastle-upon-Tyne and Gateshead Gas Company to raise additional Capital, and to extend their Works; for amending the Acts relating to the Company; and for other Purposes.
Norwich and Spalding Railway Act 1867	30 & 31 Vict. c. xxxi	31 May 1867
An Act to cancel Two Bonds entered into by the Norwich and Spalding Railway Company; and for other Purposes relating to the Company.
Hartlepool Gas and Water Act 1867 (repealed)	30 & 31 Vict. c. xxxii	31 May 1867
An Act for authorizing the Hartlepool Gas and Water Company to provide additional Waterworks, and an additional Supply of Water, and to raise further Monies, and for extending the Limits within which they may supply Gas and Water, and for other Purposes; and of which the Short Title is "The Hartlepool Gas and Water Act, 1867." (Repealed by Hartlepools Water (Consolidation, etc.) Order 1986 (SI 1986/401))
Woolton Gas Act 1867 (repealed)	30 & 31 Vict. c. xxxiii	31 May 1867
An Act for the Re-incorporation of the Woolton Gaslight Company, Limited, by the Name of the Woolton Gas Company, and for conferring additional Powers on the Company. (Repealed by Liverpool Gas Order 1926 (SR&O 1926/853))
Launceston Turnpike Roads Act 1867 (repealed)	30 & 31 Vict. c. xxxiv	31 May 1867
An Act to repeal an Act passed in the Fifth Year of the Reign of His late Majesty King William the Fourth, intituled "An Act for more effectually repairing the Launceston Turnpike Roads, and making certain additional Roads," (Note: Launceston Turnpike Roads Act 1835 (5 & 6 Will. 4. c. lxv)) and to make other Provisions in lieu thereof; and for other Purposes. (Repealed by Annual Turnpike Acts Continuance Act 1880 (43 & 44 Vict. c. 12))
Greenock Port and Harbours Act 1867 (repealed)	30 & 31 Vict. c. xxxv	31 May 1867
An Act to enable the Trustees of the Port and Harbours of Greenock to construct a new Quay, and Accesses and other Works; and for other Purposes. (Repealed by Greenock Port and Harbours Consolidation Act 1913 (3 & 4 Geo. 5. c. xlii))
Manchester Corporation Waterworks and Improvement Act 1867	30 & 31 Vict. c. xxxvi	31 May 1867
An Act for enabling the Mayor. Aldermen. and Citizens of the City of Manchester to extend their Waterworks and the Limits of their Water Supply. to make a new Street in Ardwick and other Improvements. to acquire additional Lands; and for other Purposes.
Ayr Water Company's Amendment Act 1867	30 & 31 Vict. c. xxxvii	31 May 1867
An Act to repeal certain Provisions of "The Ayr Water Company's Act, 1865," (Note: Ayr Water Company's Act 1865 (28 & 29 Vict. c. cxii)) and for other Purposes.
Rixton and Warburton Bridge Amendment Act 1867	30 & 31 Vict. c. xxxviii	31 May 1867
An Act to enable the Rixton and Warburton Bridge Company to raise further Money, and to create Preference Shares; and for other Purposes.
Prescot Gas Act 1867	30 & 31 Vict. c. xxxix	31 May 1867
An Act to reconstitute the Prescot Gaslight Company, and to provide for more effectually lighting the Town of Prescot and its Neighbourhood with Gas; and for other Purposes.
Poole Roads Act 1867	30 & 31 Vict. c. xl	31 May 1867
An Act for the Poole Roads in the County of Dorset.
Orkney Roads Act 1867	30 & 31 Vict. c. xli	31 May 1867
An Act to make further Provision for making, repairing, maintaining, and extending the Highways, Roads, and Bridges within the County of Orkney; and for other Purposes.
Eton Gas Act 1867	30 & 31 Vict. c. xlii	31 May 1867
An Act to incorporate "the Eton Gas Company (Limited)" by the Name of "the Eton Gas Company;" to enable the Company to raise additional Capital; to light the Parish of Eton with Gas; and for other Purposes.
Tendring Hundred Railway Act 1867	30 & 31 Vict. c. xliii	31 May 1867
An Act to grant further Powers to the Tendring Hundred Railway Company.
Edinburgh Improvement Act 1867	30 & 31 Vict. c. xliv	31 May 1867
An Act for the Improvement of the City of Edinburgh, and constructing new, and widening, altering, improving, and diverting existing Streets in the said City; and for other Purposes.
Horsey Island Reclamation Act Amendment Act 1867	30 & 31 Vict. c. xlv	31 May 1867
An Act to enlarge the Powers of "the Horsey Island Reclamation Company."
Ipswich Fishery Act 1867	30 & 31 Vict. c. xlvi	31 May 1867
An Act to amend and enlarge the Powers of "The Ipswich Fishery Act, 1859;" (Note: Ipswich Fishery Act 1859 (22 & 23 Vict. c. lxxii)) and to enable the Corporation to grant a Lease of the Fishery.
Selkirkshire Roads Act 1867	30 & 31 Vict. c. xlvii	31 May 1867
An Act for more effectually maintaining and keeping in repair the Roads, Highways, and Bridges, in the County of Selkirk; for making new Roads in the said County; and for other Purposes.
Wells Gas Act 1867	30 & 31 Vict. c. xlviii	31 May 1867
An Act for extending the Limits within which the Wells Gaslight Company may supply Gas, and for empowering the Company to raise additional Capital; and for other Purposes.
West Riding and Grimsby Railway Act 1867	30 & 31 Vict. c. xlix	31 May 1867
An Act to make further Provision with respect to the Station at Wakefield.
Tees Conservancy Act 1867	30 & 31 Vict. c. l	31 May 1867
An Act to enable "the Tees Conservancy Commissioners" to improve the Navigation of the River Tees; to construct Landing Places and a Graving Dock; to alter existing and impose new Tolls, Rates, and Charges, and raise further Monies; to confer Powers to take Tolls and Charges, and to repeal and amend Acts; and for other Purposes.
Aberdeen Police and Waterworks Amendment Act 1867 (repealed)	30 & 31 Vict. c. li	31 May 1867
An Act to amend "The Aberdeen Police and Waterworks Act, 1862," (Note: Aberdeen Police and Waterworks Act 1862 (25 & 26 Vict. c. cciii)) and to authorize the Commissioners of Police to raise further Sums of Money for the Purposes thereof. (Repealed by Aberdeen Corporation (Administration, Finance, &c.) Order Confirmation Act 1940 (3 & 4 Geo. 6. c. iii))
Great Eastern Railway (Steamboats) Act 1867	30 & 31 Vict. c. lii	31 May 1867
An Act to extend the Powers of the Great Eastern Railway Company with respect to the Use of Steam Vessels between Harwich and certain Foreign Ports.
Cape Railway Act 1867	30 & 31 Vict. c. liii	31 May 1867
An Act for regulating the Capital of the Cape Town Railway and Dock Company, and conferring further Powers upon that Company; and for other Purposes.
Keighley Waterworks and Improvement Act 1867 (repealed)	30 & 31 Vict. c. liv	31 May 1867
An Act to enable the Local Board of Health for the District of Keighley to purchase the existing Waterworks; to effect various Improvements in the Town of Keighley; and for other Purposes. (Repealed by West Yorkshire Act 1980 (c. xiv))
Holborn Valley Improvement (Additional Works) Act 1867 (repealed)	30 & 31 Vict. c. lv	31 May 1867
An Act for authorizing additional Works in connexion with the Holborn Valley Viaduct; and for other Purposes. (Repealed by City of London (Various Powers) Act 1969 (c. xxxix))
Local Board of Health for West Ham, in Essex, Extension of Powers Act 1867 (repealed)	30 & 31 Vict. c. lvi	31 May 1867
An Act for enabling the Local Board of Health for the District of West Ham in the County of Essex to erect a Hall and Offices for the Transaction of the Business of the said Board and of the Parish Officers of the said Parish, and for granting additional Powers to the said Local Board. (Repealed by Local Law (London Borough of Newham) Order 1965 (SI 1965/509))
Wilts and Gloucestershire Railway Act 1867 (repealed)	30 & 31 Vict. c. lvii	31 May 1867
An Act to extend the Time for the Completion of the Wilts and Gloucestershire Railway; and for other Purposes. (Repealed by Statute Law (Repeals) Act 2013 (c. 2))
Salford Improvement Act 1867	30 & 31 Vict. c. lviii	31 May 1867
An Act for altering amending and extending the Provisions of "The Salford Improvement Act, 1862," (Note: Salford Improvement Act 1862 (25 & 26 Vict. c. ccv)) for authorizing the Extension of the Gasworks, the Construction of a new Street, the raising of further Monies; and for other Purposes.
Ryde Pier Railways Act 1867	30 & 31 Vict. c. lix	31 May 1867
An Act for authorizing the Ryde Pier Company to make and maintain a Railway at Ryde in the Isle of Wight instead of Tramways authorized to be made by them there; for giving effect to an Agreement between that Company and the Ryde Station Company; and for other Purposes.
Caledonian Railway (Branches and Station) Act 1867	30 & 31 Vict. c. lx	31 May 1867
An Act for enabling the Caledonian Railway Company to make certain Branch Railways in the Counties of Lanark and Midlothian, and to acquire additional Station Ground at Carlisle; and for other Purposes.
Aylesbury Market (Amendment) Act 1867	30 & 31 Vict. c. lxi	31 May 1867
An Act to authorize the Aylesbury Market Company to raise more Money; and to amend the Act (Note: Aylesbury Market Act 1863 (26 & 27 Vict. c. xxiii)) relating to the said Company.
Dewsbury, Batley and Heckmondwike Waterworks Amendment Act 1867 (repealed)	30 & 31 Vict. c. lxii	31 May 1867
An Act to authorize the Dewsbury, Batley, and Heckmondwike Local Boards to construct new Reservoirs and Works, and to alter the Provisions of the Acts relating to their existing Waterworks with respect to the Millowners on the River Dun; and for other Purposes. (Repealed by West Yorkshire Act 1980 (c. xiv))
Hampton Court Gas Act 1867	30 & 31 Vict. c. lxiii	31 May 1867
An Act to incorporate "The Hampton Court United Gas Company" by the Name of "The Hampton Court Gas Company;" to authorize the lighting of an extended District, the raising of additional Capital; and for other Purposes.
Heywood Improvement Act 1867	30 & 31 Vict. c. lxiv	31 May 1867
An Act to alter and extend the Constitution and Powers of the Local Board for the District of the Middle Division of Heap in Lancashire, to extend such District, and to provide for the better paving, lighting, and otherwise improving the Town of Heywood in Lancashire; and for other Purposes.
Middle Level Act 1867	30 & 31 Vict. c. lxv	31 May 1867
An Act for authorizing the Middle Level Commissioners to levy a Special Tax and to raise additional Funds, and for terminating the Canal and Nene Trust; and for other Purposes.
Mold Gas and Water Act 1867	30 & 31 Vict. c. lxvi	31 May 1867
An Act for incorporating and conferring further Powers on the Mold Gas and Water Company; and for other Purposes.
Ross and Monmouth Railway Act 1867	30 & 31 Vict. c. lxvii	31 May 1867
An Act to extend the Time for the Purchase of Lands for and Completion of the Ross and Monmouth Railway; to enable the Ross and Monmouth Railway Company to divert a Portion of their Railway; and for other Purposes.
Mitcham and Wimbledon Gas Act 1867	30 & 31 Vict. c. lxviii	31 May 1867
An Act for incorporating and granting certain Powers to the Mitcham and Wimbledon District Gaslight Company.
West Kent Gas Act 1867 (repealed)	30 & 31 Vict. c. lxix	31 May 1867
An Act for incorporating and granting certain Powers to the West Kent Gas Company. (Repealed by South Suburban Gas Act 1928 (18 & 19 Geo. 5. c. lxxx))
Winestead Level Drainage Act 1867	30 & 31 Vict. c. lxx	31 May 1867
An Act to improve the Drainage of the Winestead Level and of other Lands in the Parishes of Patrington and Welwick.
Camborne Water Act 1867	30 & 31 Vict. c. lxxi	31 May 1867
An Act for better supplying with Water the Parishes of Camborne, Crowan, and Illogan, in the County of Cornwall.
Rochester Oyster Fishery (Borrowing Powers) Act 1867	30 & 31 Vict. c. lxxii	17 June 1867
An Act to alter and amend the "Rochester Oyster Fishery Act, 1865," (Note: Rochester Oyster Fishery Act 1865 (28 & 29 Vict. c. ccxxvii)) and to make further and better Provision as to the raising of Money on Mortgage of the Fishery and otherwise; and for other Purposes.
Farnworth Park and Improvement Act 1867	30 & 31 Vict. c. lxxiii	17 June 1867
An Act for confirming the Gift of a Park by Thomas Barnes, Esquire, to the Local Board of Health of the District of Farnworth, for the Benefit of the Inhabitants thereof; and for authorizing the said Local Board to maintain and regulate the said Park, and to erect a Town Hall and Market Houses, and to make new Streets, and for defining the Boundaries of and for making further Provisions for the Improvement of the District; and for other Purposes.
Athenry and Ennis Junction Railway Act 1867	30 & 31 Vict. c. lxxiv	17 June 1867
An Act to further extend the Time for the Completion of the Athenry and Ennis Junction Railway; and for other Purposes.
Wilford Bridge Act 1867 (repealed)	30 & 31 Vict. c. lxxv	17 June 1867
An Act to extend the Time limited for the Completion of the Bridge, Roads, and other Works authorized by the "Wilford Bridge Act, 1862;" (Note: Wilford Bridge Act 1862 (25 & 26 Vict. c. cxvi)) and for other Purposes. (Repealed by Statute Law (Repeals) Act 1995 (c. 44))
Rochester, Chatham and Strood Gaslight Company's Act 1867	30 & 31 Vict. c. lxxvi	17 June 1867
An Act for granting further Powers to "The Rochester, Chatham, and Strood Gas light Company."
Cambridge University and Town Gas Act 1867	30 & 31 Vict. c. lxxvii	17 June 1867
An Act to change the Name of the Cam bridge Gaslight Company, to confer further Powers on the Company, and for other Purposes.
North London Railway Act 1867	30 & 31 Vict. c. lxxviii	17 June 1867
An Act for enabling the North London Railway Company to widen further Portions of their Railway, and for granting various additional Powers to the Company.
Sunderland Ferry Act 1867 (repealed)	30 & 31 Vict. c. lxxix	17 June 1867
An Act for empowering the Corporation of Sunderland to improve the Approaches to the Bodlewell Lane Ferry over the River Wear; and for amending the Wearmouth Bridge Act, 1857; (Note: Wearmouth Bridge Act 1857 (20 & 21 Vict. c. xxxix)) and for other Purposes. (Repealed by Tyne and Wear Act 1980 (c.xliii))
Greenwich and South Eastern Docks Act 1867	30 & 31 Vict. c. lxxx	17 June 1867
An Act to revive the Powers for the Purchase of Lands, and to extend the Time for the Completion of Works authorized by "The Greenwich and South-eastern Docks Act, 1859;" (Note: Greenwich and South Eastern Docks Act 1859 (22 & 23 Vict. c. xx)) and for other Purposes.
Dublin Port Act 1867	30 & 31 Vict. c. lxxxi	17 June 1867
An Act to alter the Constitution of the Corporation for preserving and improving the Port of Dublin, and for other Purposes connected with that Body and with the Port of Dublin Corporation.
Huyton and Roby Gas Act 1867 (repealed)	30 & 31 Vict. c. lxxxii	17 June 1867
An Act for the Re-incorporation of the Huyton and Roby Gas Company (Limited), and for conferring additional Powers on the Company. (Repealed by Liverpool Gas Order 1932 (SR&O 1932/1089))
Gateshead Improvement Act 1867 (repealed)	30 & 31 Vict. c. lxxxiii	17 June 1867
An Act for authorizing the Mayor Aldermen and Burgesses of the Borough of Gateshead to erect a Town Hall and other Buildings; and for regulating their Rates, and authorizing them to raise further Monies; and for the further Improvement of the Borough; and of which the Short Title is "Gateshead Improvement Act, 1867." (Repealed by Tyne and Wear Act 1980 (c. xliii))
Ford and Lowick Turnpike Trust Act 1867	30 & 31 Vict. c. lxxxiv	17 June 1867
An Act for maintaining certain Roads and Bridges in the County of Northumberland called the Ford and Lowick Turnpikes, and for the Liquidation of the Debt due on the Security of the Tolls taken at the said Roads and Bridges.
Metropolitan Railway Act 1867	30 & 31 Vict. c. lxxxv	17 June 1867
An Act for granting further Powers to the Metropolitan Railway Company and for authorizing them to make a Junction between their Railway and the Metropolitan and Saint John's Wood Railway; for extending the Time limited for the Purchase of certain Lands and Completion of certain Works; for amending the Acts relating to the Company; and for other Purposes.
North Metropolitan Railway Act 1867	30 & 31 Vict. c. lxxxvi	17 June 1867
An Act for enabling the North Metropolitan Railway Company to make a Deviation and Branch Railway in substitution for Portions of their authorized Undertaking; and for other Purposes.
Sheffield Waterworks (Amendment) Act 1867 (repealed)	30 & 31 Vict. c. lxxxvii	17 June 1867
An Act for amending the Acts relating to the Company of Proprietors of the Sheffield Waterworks, and for extending the Limits within which the Company may supply Water; and for other Purposes. (Repealed by Sheffield Corporation (Consolidation) Act 1918 (8 & 9 Geo. 5. c. lxi))
Bingley Extension and Improvement Act 1867	30 & 31 Vict. c. lxxxviii	17 June 1867
An Act to alter and amend "The Bingley Improvement Act, 1847;" (Note: Bingley Improvement Act 1847 (10 & 11 Vict. c. cclviii)) to extend the Limits of the District of the Bingley Improvement Commissioners; to enable the Commissioners to purchase the Works of the Bingley Gas Company; and for other Purposes.
Dartford Gas Act 1867 (repealed)	30 & 31 Vict. c. lxxxix	17 June 1867
An Act to incorporate the Dartford Gaslight Company, and to make further Provision for lighting with Gas the Town and Parish of Dartford and certain Parishes and Places in the Neighbourhood thereof. (Repealed by Dartford Gas Act 1880 (43 & 44 Vict. c. cxxii))
Great Grimsby Gas Act 1867	30 & 31 Vict. c. xc	17 June 1867
An Act for extending the Limits of the District within which the Great Grimsby Gas Company may manufacture and supply Gas; and for empowering the Company to raise additional Capital; and for other Purposes.
Lombard Street Improvement Act 1867	30 & 31 Vict. c. xci	17 June 1867
An Act to authorize the Improvement of the Communications between Lombard Street, Nag's Head Court, and Clement's Lane, in the City of London; and for other Purposes.
Birkenhead Improvement Act 1867 (repealed)	30 & 31 Vict. c. xcii	17 June 1867
An Act to authorize the Birkenhead Improvement Commissioners to make new Waterworks, and to extend the Jurisdiction of the Stipendiary Magistrate for Birkenhead, and to amend the Acts relating to the said Commissioners with respect to Matters of Police, and otherwise. (Repealed by Birkenhead Corporation Act 1881 (44 & 45 Vict. c. cliii))
Llanelly Railway and Dock Company's Amendment Act 1867	30 & 31 Vict. c. xciii	17 June 1867
An Act for granting further Powers to the Llanelly Railway and Dock Company, and for other Purposes connected with the Undertakings of that Company.
London and North Western Railway (Ashby and Nuneaton Lines) Act 1867	30 & 31 Vict. c. xciv	17 June 1867
An Act to vest in the London and North-western Railway Company, jointly with the Midland Railway Company, certain Railways between Ashby and Nuneaton in the County of Leicester; and for other Purposes.
London and North Western and Lancashire and Yorkshire Railways (Fleetwood, Preston and West Riding Junction Railway Vesting) Act 1867	30 & 31 Vict. c. xcv	17 June 1867
An Act for vesting the Undertaking of the Fleetwood, Preston, and West Riding Junction Railway Company in the London and North-western Railway Company and the Lancashire and Yorkshire Railway Company; and for other Purposes.
Newry and Greenore Railway Acts Amendment Act 1867	30 & 31 Vict. c. xcvi	17 June 1867
An Act for extending the Powers of the Newry and Greenore Railway Company.
Sheffield Water (New Works) Act 1867 or the Sheffield Waterworks (New Works) Act 1867 (repealed)	30 & 31 Vict. c. xcvii	17 June 1867
An Act for empowering the Company of Proprietors of the Sheffield Waterworks to construct additional Reservoirs and alter their authorized Works, and raise further Money, and for altering Provisions of the Company's Acts respecting Compensation Supply of Water; and for other Purposes. (Repealed by Sheffield Corporation (Consolidation) Act 1918 (8 & 9 Geo. 5. c. lxi))
Swansea Vale Railway Act 1867	30 & 31 Vict. c. xcviii	17 June 1867
An Act for enabling the Swansea Vale Railway Company to construct Branch Railways; and for other Purposes.
Stockport Corporation Waterworks Act 1867 (repealed)	30 & 31 Vict. c. xcix	17 June 1867
An Act to enable the Corporation of the Borough of Stockport better to supply with Water that Borough and the Neighbourhood thereof; and for other Purposes. (Repealed by Manchester Water (No. 3) Order 1961 (SI 1961/654))
Richmond Gas Act 1867	30 & 31 Vict. c. c	17 June 1867
An Act for incorporating "the Richmond Gas Company, 1853, Limited," and for conferring upon them further Powers for the Supply of Gas to the Parish of Richmond and certain neighbouring Parishes and Places in the County of Surrey.
Thames Conservancy Act 1867 (repealed)	30 & 31 Vict. c. ci	17 June 1867
An Act for extending to the Thames between Staines and the Metropolis the Provisions of the Thames Navigation Act, 1866, (Note: Thames Navigation Act 1866 (29 & 30 Vict. c. 89)) relating to the Prevention of the Pollution of the River, and for otherwise extending and amending the Thames Conservancy and Navigation Acts; and for other Purposes. (Repealed by Thames Conservancy Act 1894 (57 & 58 Vict. c. clxxxvii))
City of Norwich Act 1867	30 & 31 Vict. c. cii	20 June 1867
An Act for the better sewering of the City of Norwich, and the applying of the Sewage to the Irrigation of Land, and for the making of the Trowse Road, and for other Purposes; and of which the Short Title is "City of Norwich Act, 1867."
Weymouth Consumers Gas Act 1867	30 & 31 Vict. c. ciii	20 June 1867
An Act for incorporating the Weymouth Gas Consumers Company, Limited, and to make further Provision for lighting with Gas the Parishes of Weymouth, Melcombe Regis, Wyke Regis, and Radipole, in the County of Dorset.
Furness Railway Act 1867	30 & 31 Vict. c. civ	20 June 1867
An Act for conferring further Powers upon the Furness Railway Company for the Construction of Works and the Acquisition of Lands, and otherwise in relation to their Undertaking; to provide for the Abandonment of the Railway authorized by "The Furness and Lancaster and Carlisle Union Railway Act, 1865," (Note: Furness and Lancaster and Carlisle Union Railway Act 1865 (28 & 29 Vict. c. cccxxix)) and the Dissolution of the Furness and Lancaster and Carlisle Union Railway Company; and for other Purposes.
Sidmouth Railway and Harbour Act 1867 (repealed)	30 & 31 Vict. c. cv	20 June 1867
An Act to enable the Sidmouth Railway and Harbour Company to make certain Deviations in their authorized Line; and for other Purposes. (Repealed by Statute Law (Repeals) Act 2013 (c. 2))
Caledonian Railway and Forth and Clyde Navigation Companies Act 1867	30 & 31 Vict. c. cvi	20 June 1867
An Act for vesting in the Caledonian Railway Company the Undertaking of the Company of Proprietors of the Forth and Clyde Navigation; and for other Purposes.
Dundee Gaslight Company's Amendment Act 1867	30 & 31 Vict. c. cvii	20 June 1867
An Act to authorize the Dundee Gaslight Company to raise a further Sum of Money; and for other Purposes.
Dundee New Gaslight Company (Additional Capital) Act 1867	30 & 31 Vict. c. cviii	20 June 1867
An Act to empower the Dundee New Gaslight Company to raise a further Sum of Money; and for other Purposes.
Great Eastern Railway (Additional Powers) Act 1867	30 & 31 Vict. c. cix	15 July 1867
An Act to constitute certain Railways authorized to be made by the Great Eastern Railway Company in and near the Metropolis a separate Undertaking, and to extend the Time limited for Purchase of Lands and Completion of Works with respect to certain of such Railways, and to confer various Powers upon the Company in reference to their Undertaking; and for other Purposes.
Southport Waterworks Act 1867 (repealed)	30 & 31 Vict. c. cx	15 July 1867
An Act to amend and enlarge the Provisions of "The Southport Waterworks Act, 1854," (Note: Southport Waterworks Act 1854 (17 & 18 Vict. c. xvi)) and "The Southport Waterworks Act, 1856;" (Note: Southport Waterworks Act 1856 (19 & 20 Vict. c. viii)) to extend the Limits of the Company for the Supply of Water; to make further and better Provision for supplying the Town of Southport and the adjoining Districts with Water; and for other Purposes. (Repealed by Southport Water (Transfer) Act 1901 (1 Edw. 7. c. ccxlviii))
Chichester Harbour Embankment Act 1867	30 & 31 Vict. c. cxi	15 July 1867
An Act to extend the Time for completing the Chichester Harbour Embankment.
Herne Water Act 1867	30 & 31 Vict. c. cxii	15 July 1867
An Act for supplying with Water the Town of Herne Bay and the Places adjacent thereto in the County of Kent.
London and North Western Railway (New Lines) Act 1867	30 & 31 Vict. c. cxiii	15 July 1867
An Act for enabling the London and North-western Railway Company to construct new Railways, Deviations, and other Works; and for other Purposes.
Peterborough Water Act 1867	30 & 31 Vict. c. cxiv	15 July 1867
An Act for supplying with Water the Town of Peterborough and certain Parishes and Places adjacent thereto in the Counties of Northampton and Lincoln.
Llynvi and Ogmore Railway Act 1867	30 & 31 Vict. c. cxv	15 July 1867
An Act to enable the Llynvi and Ogmore Railway Company to increase their Capital; and for other Purposes.
Solway Junction Railway Act 1867	30 & 31 Vict. c. cxvi	15 July 1867
An Act to enable the Solway Junction Railway Company to make a Junction with the Carlisle and Silloth Bay Railway; and for other Purposes.
Sunderland Extension and Improvement Act 1867 (repealed)	30 & 31 Vict. c. cxvii	15 July 1867
An Act for extending and altering the Boundaries of the Borough of Sunderland, and for empowering the Corporation of the Borough to make new Streets and improve existing Streets; and for other Purposes. (Repealed by Tyne and Wear Act 1980 (c. xliii))
Lampeter, Llandyssil, Tregaron and Aberayron Gas Act 1867	30 & 31 Vict. c. cxviii	15 July 1867
An Act for supplying with Gas the Towns of Lampeter, Llandyssil, Tregaron, and Aberayron, and the Neighbourhoods thereof, respectively within the Parishes of Lampeter-pont-Stephen, Llandyssil, Caron-is-clawdd, Llandewi-Aberarth, and Henfeniw, all in the County of Cardigan.
Bodmin Railway Act 1867 (repealed)	30 & 31 Vict. c. cxix	15 July 1867
An Act for conferring further Powers upon the Bodmin Railway Company. (Repealed by Statute Law (Repeals) Act 2013 (c. 2))
Cardiff and Penarth Road Act 1867 (repealed)	30 & 31 Vict. c. cxx	15 July 1867
An Act for authorizing the Maintenance and Repair of the Road leading from Cardiff to Penarth, with the Bridges thereon, and the Construction of a new Road and Bridge, and the levying of Tolls; and for other Purposes. (Repealed by Cardiff Corporation Act 1930 (20 & 21 Geo. 5. c. clxxiv))
Crickhowell Gas and Water Act 1867	30 & 31 Vict. c. cxxi	15 July 1867
An Act for the better supplying with Gas and Water the Town of Crickhowell and its Vicinity in the County of Brecon; and for other Purposes.
Neath and Brecon Railway (Additional Powers) Act 1867 (repealed)	30 & 31 Vict. c. cxxii	15 July 1867
An Act to authorize the Neath and Brecon Railway Company to acquire certain Lands at and near Swansea; to transfer to the Company the Oystermouth Tramway and Part of the Brecon Forest Tramway; and to confer other Powers on the Company. (Repealed by Neath and Brecon Railway (Amalgamation and Arrangement) Act 1869 (32 & 33 Vict. c. cxlv))
Bedford and Northampton Railway Act 1867	30 & 31 Vict. c. cxxiii	15 July 1867
An Act for authorizing the making by the Bedford and Northampton Railway Company of Lines of Railway by way of Substitution of Lines of Railway already authorized to be made by them; and for other Purposes.
Wensum Valley Railway Abandonment Act 1867 (repealed)	30 & 31 Vict. c. cxxiv	15 July 1867
An Act for authorizing the Abandonment of the making of the Wensum Valley Railway; and for other Purposes. (Repealed by Statute Law (Repeals) Act 2013 (c. 2))
Devon and Cornwall Railway Act 1867	30 & 31 Vict. c. cxxv	15 July 1867
An Act for conferring further Powers upon the Devon and Cornwall Railway Company with reference to their Extensions to Bude and Torrington; and for other Purposes; and of which the Short Title is "Devon and Cornwall Railway Act, 1867."
Widnes Improvement Act 1867	30 & 31 Vict. c. cxxvi	15 July 1867
An Act for authorizing the Local Board for the District of Widnes in the County Palatine of Lancaster to supply with Gas and with Water their District and Places near thereto, and to purchase and to acquire the Undertaking, Gasworks, Waterworks, and Property of the Widnes Gas and Water Company, and to improve their District, and to raise Monies; and for other Purposes; and of which the Short Title is "Widnes Improvement Act, 1867."
Enfield Gas Act 1867	30 & 31 Vict. c. cxxvii	15 July 1867
An Act for incorporating the Enfield Gas Company, Limited, and extending their Powers; and for other Purposes.
Plymouth Corporation Water and Markets Act 1867	30 & 31 Vict. c. cxxviii	15 July 1867
An Act for authorizing the Mayor, Aldermen, and Burgesses of the Borough of Plymouth to improve their Waterworks, and to provide a better Supply of Water to Plymouth and Places in the Neighbourhood thereof, and for the Regulation of Markets and Fairs in the Borough; and for other Purposes; and of which the Short Title is "Plymouth Corporation Water and Markets Act, 1867."
Waterford, New Ross and Wexford Junction Railway (Deviation) Act 1867	30 & 31 Vict. c. cxxix	15 July 1867
An Act to authorize the Waterford, New Ross, and Wexford Junction Railway Company to make Deviations from their authorized Railway, and to construct new Railways; and for other Purposes.
Bristol and Exeter Railway Act 1867	30 & 31 Vict. c. cxxx	15 July 1867
An Act for conferring further Powers on the Bristol and Exeter Railway Company with reference to their own Undertaking and the Undertakings of other Companies; and for other Purposes.
Great Northern Railway Act 1867	30 & 31 Vict. c. cxxxi	15 July 1867
An Act to transfer to the Great Northern Railway Company the Undertakings of the Edgware, Highgate, and London and the Watford and Edgware Junction Railway Companies; to extend the Time for the Construction of the last-named Railway; and for other Purposes with respect to the same Companies.
Wallasey Improvement Act 1867	30 & 31 Vict. c. cxxxii	15 July 1867
An Act for making further Provision with respect to the Ferries of the Wallasey Local Board, and to empower them to extend their Gasworks and to raise further Monies; and for other Purposes.
Wolverhampton Waterworks Transfer Act 1867	30 & 31 Vict. c. cxxxiii	15 July 1867
An Act to transfer the Undertaking of the Wolverhampton New Waterworks Company to the Corporation of Wolverhampton; to confirm certain Agreements between that Company and the South Staffordshire Waterworks Company; and for other Purposes.
Dalkey Township Act 1867	30 & 31 Vict. c. cxxxiv	15 July 1867
An Act for the Improvement of the Township and District of Dalkey in the Barony of Rathdown and County of Dublin.
Tyne Improvement Act 1867	30 & 31 Vict. c. cxxxv	15 July 1867
An Act to authorize the Tyne Improvement Commissioners to borrow further Sums of Money, and to construct Railways and Shipping Places in connexion with the Northumberland Docks; and for other Purposes.
Lancashire and Yorkshire Railway (North Lancashire Loop Line and Capital) Act 1867	30 & 31 Vict. c. cxxxvi	15 July 1867
An Act to authorize the Lancashire and Yorkshire Railway Company to complete the North Lancashire Loop Line between Blackburn and Burnley; and for other Purposes relating to their Undertaking.
Cambrian Railways (Finance) Act 1867	30 & 31 Vict. c. cxxxvii	15 July 1867
An Act to confer upon the Cambrian Railways Company special Facilities for raising Part of their authorized Loan Capital; and to extend the Time for the Purchase of certain Lands and the Completion of certain Works; and for other Purposes.
Witham Drainage (Fourth District) Act 1867	30 & 31 Vict. c. cxxxviii	15 July 1867
An Act to provide additional Means for draining the Fourth District of the Witham Drainage in the County of Lincoln; and for other Purposes relating to the Witham Drainage.
Kirkcaldy and Dysart Waterworks Act 1867 (repealed)	30 & 31 Vict. c. cxxxix	15 July 1867
An Act for the better supplying with Water the Parliamentary Burghs of Kirkcaldy and Dysart and Suburbs and Places adjacent; and for other Purposes. (Repealed by Kirkcaldy Corporation Order Confirmation Act 1939 (2 & 3 Geo. 6. c. vi))
Waterford and Wexford Railway Act 1867	30 & 31 Vict. c. cxl	15 July 1867
An Act to extend the Time granted to the Waterford and Wexford Railway Company for the Purchase of Lands and Execution of Works; to afford Facilities to the Company for raising the Funds necessary to execute their Undertaking; and for other Purposes.
Leeds Waterworks Act 1867	30 & 31 Vict. c. cxli	15 July 1867
An Act for authorizing the Mayor, Aldermen, and Burgesses of the Borough of Leeds to make and maintain additional Waterworks; and for other Purposes.
North Staffordshire Railway Act 1867	30 & 31 Vict. c. cxlii	15 July 1867
An Act to extend the Time for the Purchase of Lands and Completion of certain Railways by the North Staffordshire Railway Company, and to enable the said Company to widen certain Parts of their Railways, and to confer various Powers upon the Company in reference to their Capital and the Undertakings of other Companies; and for other Purposes.
East Gloucestershire Railway Act 1867	30 & 31 Vict. c. cxliii	15 July 1867
An Act to extend the Time granted to the East Gloucestershire Railway Company for the Purchase of Land and Construction of their Railways; and for other Purposes.
London and North Western Railway (New Works and Additional Powers) Act 1867	30 & 31 Vict. c. cxliv	15 July 1867
An Act for conferring additional Powers on the London and North-western Railway Company in relation to their own Undertaking and the Undertakings of other Companies; and for other Purposes.
North British Railway (General Powers) Act 1867	30 & 31 Vict. c. cxlv	15 July 1867
An Act to authorize the North British Railway Company to make certain Deviations in their Glasgow Branches, and in the Forth and Clyde Canal; and to extend the Time for the Purchase of Lands and Completion of certain Railways, and to acquire certain Lands; and for other Purposes.
Navan and Kingscourt Railway (Deviations) Act 1867	30 & 31 Vict. c. cxlvi	15 July 1867
An Act to enable the Navan and Kingscourt Railway Company to make Deviations in their authorized Railway; and for other Purposes.
Devon and Somerset Railway (Deviation) Act 1867	30 & 31 Vict. c. cxlvii	15 July 1867
An Act to enable the Devon and Somerset Railway Company to make a Deviation from their authorized Railway; to make a Junction Railway; to abandon a Portion of their authorized Railway; and for other Purposes.
East London Waterworks (Thames Supply) Act 1867	30 & 31 Vict. c. cxlviii	15 July 1867
An Act for authorizing the East London Waterworks Company to obtain a Supply of Water from the River Thames, and to make Works for the Purpose, and to raise further Monies; and for other Purposes; and of which the Short Title is "East London Waterworks (Thames Supply) Act, 1867."
East London Waterworks (Powers) Act 1867	30 & 31 Vict. c. cxlix	15 July 1867
An Act for authorizing the East London Waterworks Company to make and maintain Works in connexion with their present Waterworks; and to raise further Monies; and to make Arrangements with other Parties; and for other Purposes; and of which the Short Title is "East London Waterworks (Powers) Act, 1867."
Great Western Railway (Various Powers) Act 1867	30 & 31 Vict. c. cl	15 July 1867
An Act for conferring further Powers on the Great Western Railway Company in relation to their own Undertaking and the Undertakings of other Companies; and for other Purposes.
Carnarvon and Llanberis Railway Act 1867	30 & 31 Vict. c. cli	25 July 1867
An Act to authorize the London and North-western Railway Company to become Joint Owners of Part of the Carnarvon and Llanberis Railway; and for other Purposes.
Carnarvonshire Railway (Nantlle Railway Transfer) Act 1867	30 & 31 Vict. c. clii	25 July 1867
An Act for vesting the Undertaking of the Nantlle Railway Company in the Carnarvonshire Railway Company, and for other Purposes.
Tynemouth Gas Act 1867	30 & 31 Vict. c. cliii	25 July 1867
An Act for incorporating the Tynemouth Gas Company, and defining the Limits of Supply of Gas by them, and regulating their Capital; and for other Purposes.
West Sussex Junction Railway Act 1867 (repealed)	30 & 31 Vict. c. cliv	25 July 1867
An Act to extend the Time for the compulsory Purchase of Lands for and for the Completion of the West Sussex Junction Railway. (Repealed by Statute Law (Repeals) Act 2013 (c. 2))
Limerick Harbour Act 1867	30 & 31 Vict. c. clv	25 July 1867
An Act to carry into effect certain Arrangements made with the Commissioners of Her Majesty's Treasury for the Liquidation of the Debt and Interest due by the Limerick Harbour Commissioners to the Commissioners of Public Works in Ireland; to repeal the Rates and Duties now levied in the Port of Limerick, and to authorize other Harbour Rates to be levied in lieu thereof; to reconstitute the Harbour Commissioners; and for other Purposes.
South-western Railway (General) Act 1867	30 & 31 Vict. c. clvi	25 July 1867
An Act for authorizing the London and South-western Railway Company to make new Works, and for authorizing divers Arrangements between that Company and other Railway Companies, and for defining and regulating the Capital and Debt of that Company, and for other Purposes; and of which the Short Title is "South-western Railway General Act, 1867."
Newport Railway Act 1867	30 & 31 Vict. c. clvii	25 July 1867
An Act for making a Deviation of Part of the Newport Railway; for relinquishing a Portion of said Railway; and for other Purposes.
St. Clement Danes Improvement Act 1867 (repealed)	30 & 31 Vict. c. clviii	25 July 1867
An Act to extend the Time for the Purchase of Lands and for the Completion of the Works authorized by the Saint Clement Danes Improvement Act, 1865; (Note: St. Clement Danes Improvement Act 1865 (28 & 29 Vict. c. ccxxv)) and for other Purposes. (Repealed by London Government (City of Westminster) Order in Council 1901 (SR&O 1901/278))
Kilkenny Junction Railway (Abandonment of Kilpurcell Branch) Act 1867	30 & 31 Vict. c. clix	25 July 1867
An Act to authorize the Kilkenny Junction Railway Company to abandon the Construction of their authorized Kilpurcell Branch Railway; and for other Purposes.
Surrey and Sussex Junction Railway Act 1867	30 & 31 Vict. c. clx	25 July 1867
An Act for enabling the Surrey and Sussex Junction Railway Company to make Alterations in the Mode of constructing their Railway; to acquire additional Lands; and for other Purposes.
Waterford and Passage Railway Act 1867	30 & 31 Vict. c. clxi	25 July 1867
An Act to further extend the Time limited for the Completion of Works by the Acts relating to "The Waterford and Passage Railway Company."
Carnarvonshire Railway (Deviations) Act 1867	30 & 31 Vict. c. clxii	25 July 1867
An Act to enable the Carnarvonshire Railway Company to make Deviations in their authorized Railway; and for other Purposes.
London, Brighton and South Coast Railway Act 1867	30 & 31 Vict. c. clxiii	25 July 1867
An Act for authorizing the London, Brighton, and South Coast Railway Company to execute new Works, and Alterations of authorized Works, and to acquire additional Lands in Surrey, Sussex, and Kent; for extending the Time for exercising the Powers relating to certain Railways in Sussex; for sanctioning Arrangements with the South-eastern Railway Company; and for other Purposes.
Mold and Denbigh Junction Railway Act 1867	30 & 31 Vict. c. clxiv	25 July 1867
An Act to enable the Mold and Denbigh Junction Railway Company to run over and use Portions of the Railways of certain other Railway Companies; and to revive and extend the Powers of Purchase over certain Lands; and to extend the Time limited by "The Mold and Denbigh Junction Railway Act, 1861," (Note: Mold and Denbigh Junction Railway Act 1861 (24 & 25 Vict. c. ccxlvii)) for the Completion of Works; and for other Purposes.
Seabrook Harbour and Docks Act 1867	30 & 31 Vict. c. clxv	25 July 1867
An Act for making Docks at Seabrook, and for constructing a Pier and other Works in connexion therewith; and for other Purposes.
City of Glasgow Union Railway Act 1867	30 & 31 Vict. c. clxvi	25 July 1867
An Act to enable the City of Glasgow Union Railway Company to make a further Deviation of their authorized Railway; to construct Railways to join the Railway from Glasgow to Coatbridge; and for other Purposes.
Easton and Church Hope Railway Act 1867	30 & 31 Vict. c. clxvii	25 July 1867
An Act for making a Railway from Easton in the Isle of Portland to Church Hope Cove, with a Pier in connexion therewith; and for other Purposes.
Liverpool Improvement Act 1867 (repealed)	30 & 31 Vict. c. clxviii	25 July 1867
An Act for authorizing the making of new Streets, the widening of existing Streets, and the making of other Improvements in the Borough of Liverpool, and for other Purposes; and of which the Short Title is "Liverpool Improvement Act, 1867." (Repealed by Liverpool Corporation Act 1921 (11 & 12 Geo. 5. c. lxxiv))
Risca and Pontymister Gas Act 1867	30 & 31 Vict. c. clxix	25 July 1867
An Act for lighting with Gas the Parishes of Risca, Mynyddyslwyn, Abercarn, and Machen in the County of Monmouth.
Midland Railway (Additional Powers) Act 1867	30 & 31 Vict. c. clxx	12 August 1867
An Act for enabling the Midland Railway Company to construct new Railways and other Works, and for conferring Powers on them with respect to their own Undertaking and the Undertakings of other Companies; and for other Purposes.
Rhymney Railway Act 1867	30 & 31 Vict. c. clxxi	12 August 1867
An Act for authorizing the Rhymney Railway Company to make additional Railways, and to use Parts of the Great Western Railway, and to raise additional Monies, and for other Purposes; and of which the Short Title is "Rhymney Railway Act, 1867."
Devon and Somerset Railway (Ilfracombe) Act 1867	30 & 31 Vict. c. clxxii	12 August 1867
An Act for the Repeal of certain Provisions of "The Ilfracombe Railway Act, 1864," (Note: Ilfracombe Railway Act 1864 (27 & 28 Vict. c. cclxxii)) and of "The Ilfracombe Railway Act, 1865," (Note: Ilfracombe Railway Act 1865 (28 & 29 Vict. c. lxxi)) and for other Purposes.
Towns Drainage and Sewage Utilization Act 1867	30 & 31 Vict. c. clxxiii	12 August 1867
An Act for incorporating and empowering the Towns Drainage and Sewage Utilization Company.
Isle of Wight Railways Act 1867	30 & 31 Vict. c. clxxiv	12 August 1867
An Act for making further Provision with respect to the Capital of the Isle of Wight Railway Company, and for authorizing the Company to raise further Monies, and for other Purposes; and of which the Short Title is "Isle of Wight Railways Act, 1867."
Broxburn Railway Act 1867	30 & 31 Vict. c. clxxv	12 August 1867
An Act for making a Railway from the North British (Edinburgh and Glasgow) Railway to near Broxburn in the County of Linlithgow; and for other Purposes.
Caledonian Railway (Forfarshire Works) Act 1867	30 & 31 Vict. c. clxxvi	12 August 1867
An Act for enabling the Caledonian Railway Company to make certain Railways and other Works in the County of Forfar; and for other Purposes.
Brecon and Merthyr Railway Act 1867	30 & 31 Vict. c. clxxvii	12 August 1867
An Act for authorizing the Brecon and Merthyr Tydfil Junction Railway Company to make a Deviation and a new Line of Railway, and to abandon Part of an authorized Railway; and for making further Provision with respect to other Undertakings and Companies in which such Company is interested; and for other Purposes.
Halifax and Ovenden Railway Act 1867	30 & 31 Vict. c. clxxviii	12 August 1867
An Act to enable the Halifax and Ovenden Junction Railway Company to vary the Line of their Railway; to increase their Capital; and for other Purposes.
Idle and Shipley Railway Act 1867	30 & 31 Vict. c. clxxix	12 August 1867
An Act for making a Railway in the West Riding of Yorkshire from Idle in the Neighbourhood of Bradford to Shipley.
Wolverhampton and Walsall Railway Act 1867	30 & 31 Vict. c. clxxx	12 August 1867
An Act to authorize the Wolverhampton and Walsall Railway Company to make a Deviation from their authorized Railway at Walsall; and for other Purposes with respect to the Company.
Barnoldswick Railway Act 1867	30 & 31 Vict. c. clxxxi	12 August 1867
An Act for making and maintaining a Railway from Barnoldswick to the Leeds and Bradford Extension of the Midland Railway at or near Sough Bridge in the West Riding of the County of York; and for other Purposes.
Devon and Somerset Railway (Extension) Act 1867	30 & 31 Vict. c. clxxxii	12 August 1867
An Act to enable the Devon and Somerset Railway Company to extend their Railway at Barnstaple; and for other Purposes.
Dundalk and Greenore Railway Act 1867	30 & 31 Vict. c. clxxxiii	12 August 1867
An Act to extend the Time for the Completion of the Railway of the Dundalk and Greenore Railway Company; to enable that Company to construct new Railways at Dundalk, and to complete the joint Works authorized by "The Newry and Greenore Railway Act, 1863;" (Note: Newry and Greenore Railway Act 1863 (26 & 27 Vict. c. ccxxix)) and for other Purposes.
Sevenoaks, Maidstone and Tonbridge Railway Act 1867	30 & 31 Vict. c. clxxxiv	12 August 1867
An Act to extend the Time for the Completion of Part of the Undertaking of the Sevenoaks, Maidstone, and Tunbridge Railway Company.
Midland and Eastern and Norwich and Spalding Railways Act 1867	30 & 31 Vict. c. clxxxv	12 August 1867
An Act to confirm certain Agreements between the Midland Railway Company and the Great Northern Railway Company on the one hand, and the Midland and Eastern, the Norwich and Spalding, and the Stamford and Essendine Railway Companies on the other hand; and for other Purposes connected with the Undertakings of those Companies.
Abertillery Gas and Water Act 1867	30 & 31 Vict. c. clxxxvi	12 August 1867
An Act for supplying with Gas and Water Abertillery and the Parish of Aberystruth in the County of Monmouth; and for other Purposes.
Hastings Pier Act 1867 (repealed)	30 & 31 Vict. c. clxxxvii	12 August 1867
An Act for the Construction of a Pier at Hastings in the County of Sussex; and for other Purposes. (Repealed by Hastings Pier Act 1985 (c. xxxiii))
Rhondda Valley and Hirwain Junction Railway Act 1867	30 & 31 Vict. c. clxxxviii	12 August 1867
An Act for making Railways in the County of Glamorgan to be called the Rhondda Valley and Hirwain Junction Railway; and for other Purposes.
Hayling Railways Act 1867	30 & 31 Vict. c. clxxxix	12 August 1867
An Act for enabling the Hayling Railways Company to abandon Portions of their authorized Railway; to make a substituted Line of Railway; and for other Purposes.
Great North of Scotland Railway (Further Powers) Act 1867	30 & 31 Vict. c. cxc	12 August 1867
An Act to authorize the Amalgamation of the Banffshire Railway with the Great North of Scotland Railway, and the Abandonment of the Extension of the Banffshire Railway to Buckie; and for other Purposes.
Rathkeale and Newcastle Junction Railway Act 1867	30 & 31 Vict. c. cxci	12 August 1867
An Act to grant further Powers to the Rathkeale and Newcastle Junction Railway Company.
West Cork Railways Act 1867	30 & 31 Vict. c. cxcii	12 August 1867
An Act to grant further Powers to the West Cork Railway Company.
Bourton on the Water Railway (Extension to Cheltenham) Abandonment Act 1867 (repealed)	30 & 31 Vict. c. cxciii	12 August 1867
An Act for the Abandonment of the Railway authorized by "The Bourton on the Water Railway (Extension to Cheltenham) Act, 1864." (Note: Bourton-on-the-Water Railway (Extension to Cheltenham) Act 1864 (27 & 28 Vict. c. ccx)) (Repealed by Statute Law (Repeals) Act 2013 (c. 2))
Southsea Railway Act 1867 (repealed)	30 & 31 Vict. c. cxciv	12 August 1867
An Act for making a Railway at Southsea in the County of Southampton, and for other Purposes. (Repealed by Southsea Railway (Abandonment) Act 1869 (32 & 33 Vict. c. xciii))
River Welland Outfall Act 1867	30 & 31 Vict. c. cxcv	12 August 1867
An Act for subjecting to further Taxation Lands draining by the River Welland, and for increasing the Area of such Taxation.
Newcastle-upon-Tyne High Level Hoist Act 1867	30 & 31 Vict. c. cxcvi	12 August 1867
An Act for incorporating the Newcastle-upon-Tyne High Level Hoist Company; and for other Purposes.
Waterloo and Whitehall Railway (Amendment) Act 1867 (repealed)	30 & 31 Vict. c. cxcvii	12 August 1867
An Act to enlarge the Powers of the Waterloo and Whitehall Railway Company. (Repealed by Statute Law (Repeals) Act 2013 (c. 2))
North British Railway (Financial Arrangements) Act 1867	30 & 31 Vict. c. cxcviii	12 August 1867
An Act to authorize a Deviation in One of the Carlisle Citadel Station Branches of the North British Railway Company, and to extend the Time for the Purchase of Land and Completion of One of that Company's authorized Lines near Edinburgh; and to make Provision with respect to the Undertaking, Capital, and Borrowing Powers of that Company; and for other Purposes.
Central Cornwall Railway Act 1867 (repealed)	30 & 31 Vict. c. cxcix	15 August 1867
An Act to confer further Powers upon the Central Cornwall Railway Company with reference to the Purchase of Lands and Completion of Works; and for other Purposes. (Repealed by Statute Law (Repeals) Act 2013 (c. 2))
Wrexham, Mold and Connah's Quay Railway (Extension of Time) Act 1867	30 & 31 Vict. c. cc	15 August 1867
An Act to extend the Time for the Purchase of Lands and for the Completion of a Portion of the Wrexham, Mold, and Connah's Quay Railway.
Wandsworth Bridge Act 1867 (repealed)	30 & 31 Vict. c. cci	15 August 1867
An Act to extend the Time for the compulsory Purchase of Lands for and for the Completion of the Wandsworth Bridge, and to enable the Wandsworth Bridge Company to raise further Monies; and for other Purposes. (Repealed by Local Law (Greater London Council and Inner London Boroughs) Order 1965 (SI 1965/540))
Fulham Railway Act 1867	30 & 31 Vict. c. ccii	15 August 1867
An Act to extend the Time for the compulsory Purchase of Lands for and for the Completion of the Fulham Railway, and to enable the Fulham Railway Company to raise further Monies; and for other Purposes.
Blyth and Tyne Railway Act 1867	30 & 31 Vict. c. cciii	15 August 1867
An Act to confer further Powers upon the Blyth and Tyne Railway Company with reference to the Construction of Branches and other Works and the Purchase of Lands and Wayleave and other Rents; and for other Purposes.
Bristol Port Railway and Pier (Clifton Extension) Act 1867	30 & 31 Vict. c. cciv	15 August 1867
An Act to authorize the Bristol Port Railway and Pier Company to construct Railways for connecting their existing Railway with the Bristol and South Wales Union Railway and the Bristol and Birmingham Line of the Midland Railway; and for other Purposes.
Dublin Trunk Connecting Railway Act 1867	30 & 31 Vict. c. ccv	15 August 1867
An Act to extend the Powers of the Dublin Trunk Connecting Railway Company for the taking of Lands and Completion of their Undertaking.
Mersey Docks (Various Powers) Act 1867 (repealed)	30 & 31 Vict. c. ccvi	15 August 1867
An Act to confirm the Expenditure by the Mersey Docks and Harbour Board of certain Monies; and for other Purposes. (Repealed by Mersey Docks and Harbour Act 1971 (c. lvii))
Cheshire Lines Act 1867	30 & 31 Vict. c. ccvii	15 August 1867
An Act for incorporating the Cheshire Lines Committee, and for authorising that Committee to make a new Road, and for other Purposes.
Great Eastern Railway (Finance) Act 1867	30 & 31 Vict. c. ccviii	20 August 1867
An Act to confer upon the Great Eastern Railway Company Facilities for raising Money; and for other Purposes.
London, Chatham and Dover Railway (Arrangement) Act 1867	30 & 31 Vict. c. ccix	20 August 1867
An Act to authorize the London, Chatham, and Dover Railway Company to raise a Sum of Money for the Satisfaction of certain Claims and for other Purposes relating to the Undertaking of the Company.

=== Private acts ===
Short title	Citation	Royal assent
Long title
Duke of Cleveland's Estate Act 1867	30 & 31 Vict. c. 1 Pr.	25 July 1867
An Act for authorizing Building and Improving Leases and Sales of certain Parts of the Estates at Darlington and Barnard Castle in the County of Durham. and at Wolverhampton in the County of Stafford, comprised in or subject to certain Deeds of Settlement and the Will of the late William Harry First Duke of Cleveland; and for other Purposes.
Ramsden Estate Act 1867	30 & 31 Vict. c. 2 Pr.	25 July 1867
An Act for authorizing Leases of the Settled Estates of Sir John William Ramsden, Baronet, in the Parishes of Huddersfield, Almondbury, and Kirkheaton, in the West Riding of the County of York, and for other Purposes; and of which the Short Title is "The Ramsden Estate Act, 1867."
Snailbeach Mine Estate Act 1867	30 & 31 Vict. c. 3 Pr.	25 July 1867
An Act for facilitating the Acceptance of Stock of the Snailbeach Mine Company (Limited) in substitution for Shares in the Snailbeach Mine Company; and for other Purposes.
Marquess of Anglesey's Estate Act 1867	30 & 31 Vict. c. 4 Pr.	12 August 1867
An Act for authorizing Trustees of the Settled Family Estates of the Marquess of Anglesey to become the Undertakers under "The Stapenhill Bridge Act, 1865," (Note: Stapenhill Bridge Act 1865 (28 & 29 Vict. c. cccxiv)) and for extending their Powers over the Settled Estates; and of which the Short Title is "Marquess of Anglesey's Estate Act, 1867."
Reading School Act 1867	30 & 31 Vict. c. 5 Pr.	12 August 1867
An Act for the better Regulation of the Grammar School and John Kendricke's Loan Charity, Reading.
Queen's College, Birmingham Act 1867	30 & 31 Vict. c. 6 Pr.	12 August 1867
An Act for the Regulation of the Queen's College at Birmingham. and for incorporating the Queen's Hospital at Birmingham.
Barker Mill's Estate Act 1867	30 & 31 Vict. c. 7 Pr.	12 August 1867
An Act for continuing and extending some of the Powers and Provisions of Barker Mill's Estate Act, 1852, (Note: Barker Mill's Estate Act 1852 (15 & 16 Vict. c. 18 Pr.)) and for other Purposes and to be called "Barker Mill's Estate Act, 1867."
Charterhouse School Act 1867	30 & 31 Vict. c. 8 Pr.	20 August 1867
An Act for enabling the Governors of the Lands, Possessions, Revenues, and Goods of the Hospital of King James, founded in Charterhouse within the County of Middlesex, at the humble Petition and only Costs and Charges of Thomas Sutton Esquire, to sell the Site of the School of the said Hospital and other Lands; to acquire a new Site for the School, and to erect a new School thereon; and for other Purposes.
Skipton Grammar School Act 1867	30 & 31 Vict. c. 9 Pr.	21 August 1867
An Act for the better Regulation of Skipton Grammar School.
Thomson's Divorce Act 1867 (Note: This act was not printed by the Queen's Printer.)	30 & 31 Vict. c. 10 Pr.	5 April 1867
An Act to dissolve the Marriage of James Sinclair Thomson, Lieutenant-Colonel of Her Majesty's 54th Regiment of Infantry, with Roberta Spencer Thomson his now Wife, and to enable him to marry again; and for other Purposes.
Bischoffsheim's Naturalization Act 1867	30 & 31 Vict. c. 11 Pr.	12 August 1867
An Act to naturalize Henri Louis Bischoffsheim, and to grant to and confer upon him all the Rights, Privileges, and Capacities of a natural-born Subject of Her Majesty the Queen.
Baron de Ferrieres' Naturalization Act 1867	30 & 31 Vict. c. 12 Pr.	12 August 1867
An Act to naturalize Charles Conrad Adolphus Du Bois de Ferrieres, commonly known as the Baron de Ferrieres, and to grant to and confer upon him all the Rights, Privileges, and Capacities of a natural-born Subject of Her Majesty the Queen.
Lange's Naturalization Act 1867	30 & 31 Vict. c. 13 Pr.	12 August 1867
An Act to naturalize Daniel Adolphus Lange, and to grant to and confer upon him all the Rights, Privileges, and Capacities of a natural-born Subject of Her Majesty the Queen.

=== Sources ===
- Paterson, William, ed. (1867). The Practical Statutes of the Session 1867 (30 and 31 Victoria). London: Horace Cox – via Google Books.
- The Public General Acts of the United Kingdom of Great Britain and Ireland Anno Regni Victoriæ, Britanniarum Reginæ, Tricesimo. London: Eyre & Spottiswoode. 1867 – via Google Books.

== 31 & 32 Vict. ==
The third session of the 19th Parliament of the United Kingdom, which met from 19 November 1867 until 31 July 1868.

=== Public general acts ===
Short title	Citation	Royal assent
Long title
Consolidated Fund (£2,000,000) Act 1867 (repealed)	31 & 32 Vict. c. 1	7 December 1867
An Act to apply the Sum of Two million Pounds out of the Consolidate Fund to the Service of the Year ending the Thirty-first Day of March One thousand eight hundred and sixty-eight. (Repealed by Statute Law Revision Act 1875 (38 & 39 Vict. c. 66))
Income Tax Act 1867 (repealed)	31 & 32 Vict. c. 2	7 December 1867
An Act to grant to Her Majesty additional Rates of Income Tax. (Repealed by Statute Law Revision Act 1875 (38 & 39 Vict. c. 66))
Drainage and Improvement of Lands Supplemental Act (Ireland) 1867 or the Drainage and Improvement of Lands Supplemental Act (Ireland) (No. 3) 1867	31 & 32 Vict. c. 3	7 December 1867
An Act to confirm a Provisional Order under The Drainage and Improvement of Lands (Ireland) Act, 1863, (Note: Drainage and Improvement of Lands Act (Ireland) 1863 (26 & 27 Vict. c. 88)) and the Act (Note: Drainage and Improvement of Lands (Ireland) Act 1864 (27 & 28 Vict. c. 72)) amending the same.
	In the Matter of Elphin Drainage District, County of Roscommon.	
Sales of Reversions Act 1867	31 & 32 Vict. c. 4	7 December 1867
An Act to amend the Law relating to Sales of Reversions. (Repealed for England and Wales by Law of Property Act 1925 (15 & 16 Geo. 5. c. 20))
Metropolitan Streets Act Amendment Act 1867	31 & 32 Vict. c. 5	7 December 1867
An Act for the amendment of "The Metropolitan Streets Act, 1867." (Note: Metropolitan Streets Act 1867 (30 & 31 Vict. c. 134))
Totnes, &c., Writs Act (repealed)	31 & 32 Vict. c. 6	7 December 1867
An Act to forbid the Issue of Writs for Members to serve in this present Parliament for the Boroughs of Totnes, Reigate, Great Yarmouth, and Lancaster. (Repealed by Statute Law Revision Act 1875 (38 & 39 Vict. c. 66))

=== Sources ===
- 31 & 32 Victoria - 1867-8. 1807 – via Internet Archive.
- different edition. 1838 – via Internet Archive.

== See also ==
- List of acts of the Parliament of the United Kingdom
