= Public Libraries Act (Scotland) 1867 =

Act of the Parliament of the United Kingdom

Public Libraries Act (Scotland) 1867 (Note: Section 19.)
- Act of Parliament
- Parliament of the United Kingdom
- Long title: An Act to amend and consolidate the Public Libraries Acts (Scotland).
- Citation: 30 & 31 Vict. c. 37
- Territorial extent: United Kingdom

Dates
- Royal assent: 15 July 1867
- Commencement: 15 July 1867 (Note: The Acts of Parliament (Commencement) Act 1793.)
- Repealed: 16 September 1887

Other legislation
- Amends: See § Repealed enactments
- Repeals/revokes: See § Repealed enactments
- Amended by: Public Libraries Amendment Act 1877; Public Libraries Act (Scotland, 1867) Amendment Act 1871
- Repealed by: Public Libraries Consolidation (Scotland) Act 1887

Status: Repealed

Text of statute as originally enacted

The Public Libraries Act (Scotland) 1867 (30 & 31 Vict. c. 37) was an act of the Parliament of the United Kingdom that consolidated enactments related to public libraries in Scotland.

== Provisions ==
=== Repealed enactments ===
Section 1 of the act repealed 2 enactments, listed in that section; the repeal did not affect anything already done under either act, and libraries and museums already established in Scotland under them were to be treated as established under the act.

Citation	Short title	Description	Extent of repeal
17 & 18 Vict. c. 64	Public Libraries (Scotland) Act 1854	An Act to amend an Act of the last Session for extending the Public Libraries Act, 1850, to Ireland and Scotland.	The whole act.
29 & 30 Vict. c. 114	Public Libraries Amendment Act (England and Scotland) 1866	An Act to amend the Public Libraries Act.	So much as relates to Scotland.

== Subsequent developments ==
Sections 7 and 8 of the act were repealed by section 1 of the Public Libraries Act (Scotland, 1867) Amendment Act 1871 (34 & 35 Vict. c. 59), which came into force on 31 July 1871.

The whole act was repealed by section 3 of the Public Libraries Consolidation (Scotland) Act 1887 (50 & 51 Vict. c. 42), which came into force on 16 September 1887.
