= Friendly Societies Act =

Stock short title used for legislation

Friendly Societies Act (with its variations) is a stock short title used in New Zealand and the United Kingdom for legislation relating to friendly societies.

== List ==
=== Australia ===
==== New South Wales ====
- Friendly Societies Act 1843 (7 Vict. No. X) An Act to regulate Friendly Societies in the Colony of New South Wales. (24 November 1843)
- Friendly Societies Act 1848 (11 Vict. No. LIII) An Act to amend the Act regulating Friendly Societies in New South Wales. (17 June 1848)
- Friendly Societies Act 1899
- Friendly Societies (Amendment) Act 1900
- Friendly Societies (Further Amendment) Act 1901
- Friendly Societies (Amendment) Act 1906
- Subventions to Friendly Societies Act 1908
- Friendly Societies Act 1912 (No. 46) An Act to consolidate the Acts relating to friendly societies. (26 November 1912)
- Friendly Societies (Amendment) Act 1931 (No. 19) An Act to enable friendly societies to borrow, upon the security of their assets, up to the extent of their funds invested or deposited with the Government Savings Bank of New South Wales; to amend the Friendly Societies Act, 1912, and for purposes connected therewith. (22 May 1931)
- Friendly Societies Act 1989 (No. 232) An Act to provide for the registration, incorporation and administration of friendly societies; to confer and impose functions on friendly societies and associated persons and bodies; to repeal the Friendly Societies Act 1912; and for other purposes. (21 December 1989)
- Friendly Societies (New South Wales) Act 1997 (No. 11) An Act to provide for the formation, registration, management and regulation of friendly societies; and to consequentially repeal and amend certain other legislation. (21 May 1997)

=== New Zealand ===
- The Friendly Societies Act 1856 (19 & 20 Vict No 28)
- The Friendly Societies Act 1867 (31 Vict No 27)
- The Friendly Societies Act 1877 (41 Vict No 10)
- The Friendly Societies Act Amendment Act 1878 (42 Vict No 23)
- The Friendly Societies Act 1882 (46 Vict No 36)
- The Friendly Societies Act 1882 Amendment Act 1886 (50 Vict No 6)
- The Friendly Societies Act 1882 Amendment Act 1892
- The Friendly Societies Act 1909 (9 Edw 7 No 12)
- The Friendly Societies Amendment Act 1911 (2 Geo 5 No 5)
- The Friendly Societies Amendment Act 1914 (5 Geo 5 No 47)
- The Friendly Societies Amendment Act 1915 (6 Geo 5 No 64)
- The Friendly Societies Amendment Act 1922 (13 Geo 5 No 56)
- The Friendly Societies Amendment Act 1948 (No 23)
- The Friendly Societies Amendment Act 1949 (No 30)
- The Friendly Societies Amendment Act 1953 (No 62)
- The Friendly Societies Amendment Act 1954 (No 44)
- The Friendly Societies Amendment Act 1957 (No 50)
- The Friendly Societies Amendment Act 1959 (No 64)
- The Friendly Societies Amendment Act 1961 (No 112)
- The Friendly Societies Amendment Act 1962 (No 70)
- The Friendly Societies Amendment Act 1963 (No 89)
- The Friendly Societies Amendment Act 1964 (No 88)
- The Friendly Societies Amendment Act 1968 (No 83)
- The Friendly Societies Amendment Act 1970 (No 63)
- The Friendly Societies Amendment Act 1972 (No 61)
- The Friendly Societies Amendment Act 1973 (No 63)
- The Friendly Societies Amendment Act 1975 (No 21)
- The Friendly Societies Amendment Act 1977 (No 152)
- The Friendly Societies and Credit Unions Act 1982 (No 118)
- The Friendly Societies and Credit Unions Amendment Act 1985 (No 118)
- The Friendly Societies and Credit Unions Amendment Act (No 2) 1985 (No 177)
- The Friendly Societies and Credit Unions Amendment Act 1987 (No 142)
- The Friendly Societies and Credit Unions Amendment Act 2004 (No 28)
- The Friendly Societies and Credit Unions Amendment Act 2006 (No 65)
- The Friendly Societies and Credit Unions Amendment Act 2007 (No 59)

=== United Kingdom ===
- The Friendly Societies Act 1795 (35 Geo. 3. c. 111)
- The Friendly Societies Act 1855 (18 & 19 Vict. c. 63)
- The Revenue, Friendly Societies, and National Debt Act 1882 (45 & 46 Vict. c. 72)
- The Friendly Societies Act 1875 (38 & 39 Vict. c. 60)
- The Friendly Societies Act 1887 (50 & 51 Vict. c. 56)
- The Friendly Societies Act 1889 (52 & 53 Vict. c. 22)
- The Friendly Societies Act 1893 (56 & 57 Vict. c. 30)
- The Friendly Societies Act 1895 (58 & 59 Vict. c. 26)
- The Friendly Societies Act 1896 (59 & 60 Vict. c. 25)
- The Friendly Societies Act 1908 (8 Edw. 7. c. 32)
- The Friendly Societies Act 1924 (14 & 15 Geo. 5. c. 11)
- The Industrial Assurance and Friendly Societies Act 1929 (19 & 20 Geo. 5. c. 28)
- The Industrial Assurance and Friendly Societies Act 1948 (11 & 12 Geo. 6. c. 39)
- The Friendly Societies Act 1955 (4 & 5 Eliz. 2. c. 19)
- The Industrial Assurance and Friendly Societies Act 1948 (Amendment) Act 1958 (6 & 7 Eliz. 2. c. 27)
- The Friendly and Industrial and Provident Societies Act 1968 (c. 55)
- The Friendly Societies Act 1971 (c. 66)
- The Friendly Societies Act 1974 (c. 46)
- The Friendly Societies Act 1981 (c. 50)
- The Friendly Societies Act 1984 (c. 62)
- The Friendly Societies Act 1992 (c. 40)
- The Co-operatives, Mutuals and Friendly Societies Act 2023 (c. 23)

The Friendly Societies Acts 1875 to 1895 was the collective title of the Friendly Societies Act 1875, the Friendly Societies Act 1887, the Friendly Societies Act 1889, the Friendly Societies Act 1893 and the Friendly Societies Act 1895.

==== Northern Ireland ====
- The Industrial Assurance and Friendly Societies Act (Northern Ireland) 1948 (c. 22) (NI)
- The Friendly Societies Act (Northern Ireland) 1957 (c. 1) (NI)
- The Friendly Societies Act (Northern Ireland) 1970 (c. 31) (NI)

== See also ==
- List of short titles
