= Friendly Societies Act 1875 =

Act of the Parliament of the United Kingdom

Friendly Societies Act 1875 (Note: Section 1.)
- Act of Parliament
- Parliament of the United Kingdom
- Long title: An Act to consolidate and amend the Law relating to Friendly and other Societies.
- Citation: 38 & 39 Vict. c. 60
- Introduced by: Stafford Northcote MP (Commons)
- Territorial extent: United Kingdom; Channel Islands; Isle of Man; (Note: Section 2.)

Dates
- Royal assent: 11 August 1875
- Commencement: 11 August 1875 (section 10, 37 and 38); 1 January 1876 (rest of the act( (Note: Section 3.)
- Repealed: 1 January 1897
Other legislation
Amends	See § Repealed enactments
Repeals/revokes	See § Repealed enactments
Amended by	Statute Law Revision Act 1883; Summary Jurisdiction Act 1884; Friendly Society Act 1896
Repealed by	Collecting Societies and Industrial Assurance Companies Act 1896
Relates to	Friendly Societies Act 1829; Friendly Societies Act 1850; Friendly Societies Act 1855; Friendly Societies Act 1896

Status: Repealed

History of passage through Parliament

Records of Parliamentary debate relating to the statute from Hansard

Text of statute as originally enacted

The Friendly Societies Act 1875 (38 & 39 Vict. c. 60) was an act of the Parliament of the United Kingdom passed by Benjamin Disraeli's Conservative government following the publication of the Royal Commission on Friendly Societies' Final Report to consolidate and amend enactments relating to friendly societies.

It was one of the Friendly Societies Acts 1875 to 1895.

The act encouraged friendly societies to register with the Registrar of Friendly Societies by granting them the legal right to own land and property in the name of their trustees and the power to take out legal proceedings, in return for registration. Registered societies were subject to regulation: for example they were required to submit returns to the Registrar every five years which gave details of their financial affairs and in-force business which could be used by the Registrar to evaluate their assets against their liabilities under life assurance, annuity and sickness business.

Friendly societies paid de facto old-age pensions in the form of sickness benefit, and the Act defined "old age" as 50 and above. Although a court ruled that "natural decay" was not "sickness" the majority of friendly societies did not accept this ruling as they were in competition with each other, and wanted to continue paying pensions to attract new members.

The act allowed friendly societies considerable self-management "but insured the adoption of sound rules, effective audit, and rates of payment sufficient to maintain solvency. It established the friendly societies, and with them the people's savings on a satisfactory basis".

== Background ==
The Friendly Societies Act 1829 (10 Geo. 4. c. 56) and the Friendly Societies Act 1855 (18 & 19 Vict. c. 63) consolidated and amended enactments relating to friendly societies.

In 1870, a Royal Commission was appointed to inquire into the working of friendly societies, making a report with recommendations for further consolidation and amendment.

== Passage ==
Leave to bring in the Friendly Societies Bill was granted to the Chancellor of the Exchequer, Stafford Northcote MP, the Home Secretary, R. A. Cross MP and William Henry Smith MP on 8 February 1875. The bill had its first reading in the House of Commons on 8 February 1875, presented by the Chancellor of the Exchequer, Stafford Northcote MP. The bill had its second reading in the House of Commons on 15 March 1875 and was committed to a committee of the whole house, which met on 31 May 1875, 1 June 1875, 3 June 1875 and 4 June 1875 and reported on 4 June 1875 with amendments. The amended bill was considered on 22 June 1875, with further amendments. The amended bill had its third reading in the House of Commons on 24 June 1875 and passed, without amendments.

The bill had its first reading in the House of Lords on 25 June 1875. The bill had its second reading in the House of Lords on 8 July 1875, and was committed to a committee of the whole house, which met on 15 July 1875 and reported on 20 July 1875, with amendments. The amended bill was considered on 20 July 1875, with further amendments. The amended bill had its third reading in the House of Lords on 22 July 1875 and passed, with amendments.

The amended bill was considered by the House of Commons on 30 July 1875. A committee was appointed to draw up reasons for several disagreements, which reported on 31 July 1875, the amendments of which were not disagreed to by the House of Lords on 3 August 1875.

The bill was granted royal assent on 11 August 1875.

== Provisions ==
The act consolidated provisions relating to friendly societies, and made amendments.

=== Repealed enactments ===
Section 5 of the act repealed 13 enactments, listed in the first schedule to the act, but provided that this would not affect any societies incorporated or acts done under that act before repeal.

Section 6 of the act provided that every society incorporated under previous acts would continue to be valid.

Citation	Short title	Title	Extent of repeal
52 Geo. 3. c. 38	Local Militia (England) Act 1812	An Act to amend the Laws relating to Local Militia in England.	Section 41.
52 Geo. 3. c. 68	Local Militia (Scotland) Act 1812	An Act to amend the Laws relating to Local Militia in Scotland.	Section 39.
17 & 18 Vict. c. 105	Militia Law Amendment Act 1854	An Act to amend the Law relating to the Militia in England and Wales.	Section 44.
17 & 18 Vict. c. 106	Militia (Scotland) Act 1854	An Act for amending the Laws relating to the Militia and raising a Volunteer Militia Force in Scotland.	Section 69.
17 & 18 Vict. c. 107	Militia (Ireland) Act 1854	An Act for amending the Laws relating to the Militia and raising a Volunteer Militia Force in Ireland.	Section 27.
18 & 19 Vict. c. 63	Friendly Societies Act 1855	An Act to consolidate and amend the Law relating to Friendly Societies.	The whole Act.
21 & 22 Vict. c. 101	Friendly Societies Act 1858	An Act to amend the Act of the 18th and 19th years of Her present Majesty, chapter 63, relating to Friendly Societies.	The whole Act.
22 & 23 Vict. c. 40	Royal Naval Reserve (Volunteer) Act 1859	An Act for the establishment of a Reserve Volunteer Force of Seamen, and for the government of the same.	Section 23.
23 & 24 Vict. c. 13 (Note: Incorrectly cited as "23 Vict. c. 13".)	Friendly Societies Act 1860	An Act to prevent the members of Benefit Societies from forfeiting their interest therein by being enrolled in Volunteer Corps.	The whole Act.
23 & 24 Vict. c. 58	Friendly Societies (No. 2) Act 1860	An Act to amend an Act of the 18th and 19th years of Her Majesty relating to Friendly Societies.	The whole Act.
26 & 27 Vict. c. 65	Volunteer Act 1863	An Act to consolidate and amend the Acts relating to the Volunteer Force in Great Britain.	Section 44.
29 & 30 Vict. c. 34 (Note: Incorrectly cited as "29 Vict. c. 34".)	Cattle Assurance Act 1866	An Act to give further facilities for the establishment of Societies for the Assurance of Cattle and other Animals.	The whole Act.
36 & 37 Vict. c. 77	Naval Artillery Volunteer Act 1873	An Act to provide for the establishment of a Royal Naval Artillery Volunteer Force.	Section 33.

== Subsequent developments ==
The act was described as a Consolidation Act.

In 1889 Mr Braxton Hicks, the London coroner, wrote a letter to The Times about the dangers of child life insurance. He wrote that the insurances act as a temptation to the parents to neglect them, or to feed them with improper food, and sometimes even to kill them, as in the excessively numerous cases of "over-laying" or suffocating in bed.

The whole act was repealed by section 18 of, and the schedule to, the Collecting Societies and Industrial Assurance Companies Act 1896 (59 & 60 Vict. c. 26), which came into force on 1 January 1897.
