= Friendly Societies Act 1829 =

Act of the Parliament of the United Kingdom

- Act of Parliament
- Parliament of the United Kingdom
- Long title: An Act to consolidate and amend the Laws relating to Friendly Societies.
- Citation: 10 Geo. 4. c. 56
- Introduced by: Edward Portman MP (Commons)
- Territorial extent: United Kingdom

Dates
- Royal assent: 19 June 1829
- Commencement: 19 June 1829 (Note: The Acts of Parliament (Commencement) Act 1793.)
- Repealed: 1 August 1855
Other legislation
Amends	See § Repealed enactments
Repeals/revokes	See § Repealed enactments
Amended by	Friendly Societies Act 1832; Friendly Societies Act 1834; Friendly Societies Act 1840; Friendly Societies Act 1846; Friendly Societies Act 1850
Repealed by	Friendly Societies Act 1855
Relates to	Friendly Societies Act 1850; Friendly Societies Act 1855; Friendly Societies Act 1875; Friendly Societies Act 1896

Status: Repealed

History of passage through Parliament

Records of Parliamentary debate relating to the statute from Hansard

Text of statute as originally enacted

The Friendly Societies Act 1829 (10 Geo. 4. c. 56) was an act of the Parliament of the United Kingdom that consolidated and amended enactments relating to friendly societies in the United Kingdom.

== Passage ==
Leave to bring in the Friendly Societies Bill to the House of Commons was granted to Edward Portman MP, Thomas Potter MacQueen MP, Davies Gilbert MP, Sir James Graham, 2nd Baronet MP and Sir William Heathcote, 3rd Baronet MP on 6 March 1829. The bill had its first reading in the House of Commons on 17 March 1829, presented by Edward Portman MP. The bill had its second reading in the House of Commons on 4 May 1829 and was committed to a committee of the whole house, which met and reported on 6 May 1829, with amendments. The amended bill was re-committee of the whole house, which met on 15 May 1829 and reported on 18 May 1829. The amended bill had its third reading in the House of Commons on 19 May 1829 and passed, without amendments.

The bill had its first reading in the House of Lords on 20 May 1829. The bill had its second reading in the House of Lords on 2 June 1829 and was committed to a committee of the whole house, which met on 4 June 1829 and reported on 5 June 1829, with amendments. The amended bill had its third reading in the House of Lords on 6 June 1829 and passed, without amendments.

The amended bill was considered and agreed to by the House of Commons on 12 June 1829.

The bill was granted royal assent on 19 June 1829.

== Provisions ==
=== Repealed enactments ===
Section 1 of the act repealed 7 enactments, listed in that section. Section 1 of the act also provided that the repeals would not affect anything done before the repeals.

Citation	Short title	Title	Extent of repeal
33 G. 3. c. 54	Friendly Societies Act 1793	An Act passed in the Thirty-third Year of His late Majesty's Reign, intituled An Act for the Encouragement and Relief of Friendly Societies.	The whole act.
35 G. 3. c. 111	Friendly Societies Act 1795	An Act passed in the Thirty-fifth Year of His said late Majesty's Reign, intituled An Act for the more effectually carrying into Execution an Act made in the Thirty-third Year of the Reign of His present Majesty, intituled An Act for the Encouragement and Relief of Friendly Societies, and for extending so much of the Powers thereof as relates to the framing Rules and Regulations for the better Management of the Funds of such Societies, and the Appointment of Treasurers, to other Institutions of a charitable Nature.	As relates to Friendly Societies.
36 G. 3. (I)	Friendly Societies Act 1796	An Act passed in the Parliament of Ireland in the Thirty-sixth Year of His said late Majesty's Reign, intituled An Act for the Encouragement and Relief of Friendly Societies; and also an Act passed in the Forty-third Year of His said late Majesty's Reign, intituled An Act for enabling Friendly Societies, intended to be established under an Act passed in the Thirty-third Year of the Reign of His present Majesty to rectify Mistakes made in the Registry of their Rules.	The whole act.
43 G. 3. c. 111	Friendly Societies Act 1803	An Act passed in the Forty-ninth Year of His said late Majesty's Reign, to explain and render more effectual the said recited Act made in the Parliament of Ireland in the Thirty-sixth Year of His said late Majesty's Reign.	The whole act.
49 G. 3. c. 125	Friendly Societies Act 1809	An Act passed in the Forty-ninth Year of His said late Majesty's Reign, intituled An Act to amend an Act made in the Thirty-third Year of His present Majesty, for the Encouragement and Relief of Friendly Societies.	The whole act.
59 G. 3. c. 128	Friendly Societies Act 1819	An Act passed in the Fifty-ninth Year of His said late Majesty's Reign, intituled An Act for the further Protection and Encouragement of Friendly Societies, and for preventing Frauds and Abuses therein.	The whole act.
6 G. 4.c . 74	Infants, Lunatics, etc. Act 1825	An Act passed in the Sixth Year of the Reign of His present Majesty, intituled An Act for consolidating and amending the Laws relating to Conveyances and Transfers of Estates and Funds vested in Trustees who are Infants, Idiots, Lunatics, or Trustees of unsound Mind, or who cannot be compelled or refuse to act, and the Laws relating to Stocks and Securities belonging to Infants, Idiots, Lunatics, and Persons of unsound Mind.	As relates to Friendly Societies, for the better Security, or for the Application, Receipt, Payment, or Transfer of any of the Funds thereof.

== Subsequent developments ==
The act was amended by the Friendly Societies Act 1832 (2 & 3 Will. 4. c. 37), the Friendly Societies Act 1834 (4 & 5 Will. 4. c. 40), the Friendly Societies Act 1840 (3 & 4 Vict. c. 73) and the Friendly Societies Act 1846 (9 & 10 Vict. c. 27).

The whole act was repealed by section 1 of the Friendly Societies Act 1850 (13 & 14 Vict. c. 115), which consolidated and amended enactments relating to friendly societies.

The whole act was again repealed by section 5 of, and the first schedule to, the Friendly Societies Act 1855 (18 & 19 Vict. c. 63), which came into force on 1 August 1855 and consolidated and amended enactments relating to friendly societies.

The acts repealed by the act were again repealed by the Friendly Societies Act 1855 (18 & 19 Vict. c. 63), which extended to the Channel Islands and the Isle of Man.
