= Friendly Societies Act 1850 =

Act of the Parliament of the United Kingdom

Friendly Societies Act 1850 (Note: The citation of this act by this short title was authorised by section 1 of, and the first schedule to, the Short Titles Act 1896. Due to the repeal of those provisions it is now authorised by section 19(2) of the Interpretation Act 1978.)
- Act of Parliament
- Parliament of the United Kingdom
- Long title: An Act to consolidate and amend the Laws relating to Friendly Societies.
- Citation: 13 & 14 Vict. c. 115
- Territorial extent: United Kingdom

Dates
- Royal assent: 15 August 1850
- Commencement: 15 August 1850 (Note: Section 51.)
- Expired: 15 August 1851
- Repealed: 1 August 1855
Other legislation
Amends	See § Repealed enactments
Repeals/revokes	See § Repealed enactments
Amended by	Friendly Societies Act 1852
Repealed by	Friendly Societies Act 1855
Relates to	Friendly Societies Act 1829; Benefit Building Societies Act 1836; Friendly Societies Act 1855; Friendly Societies Act 1875; Friendly Societies Act 1896

Status: Repealed

Text of statute as originally enacted

The Friendly Societies Act 1850 (13 & 14 Vict. c. 115) was an act of the Parliament of the United Kingdom that consolidated and amended enactments relating to friendly societies in the United Kingdom.

== Provisions ==
=== Repealed enactments ===
Section 1 of the act repealed 4 enactments, listed in that section, except for any benefit building societies established by the Benefit Building Societies Act 1836 (6 & 7 Will. 4. c. 32).

Citation	Short title	Description	Extent of repeal
10 Geo. 4. c. 56	Friendly Societies Act 1829	An Act passed in the Tenth Year of His late Majesty King George the Fourth, intituled AnAct to consolidate and amend the Laws relating to Friendly	The whole act.
2 & 3 Will. 4. c. 37	Friendly Societies Act 1832	An Act passed in the Second Year of His late Majesty King William the Fourth, intituled An Act to amend an Act of the Tenth Year ofHis late Majesty KingGeorge the Fourth, by extending the Time within which pre-existing Societies must conform to the Provisions of that Act.	The whole act.
4 & 5 Will. 4. c. 40	Friendly Societies Act 1834	An Act passed in the Fourth and Fifth Years of His late Majesty King William the Fourth, intituled An Act to amend an Act of the Tenth Year of His late Majesty King George the Fourth, to consolidate and amend the Laws relating to Friendly Societies.	The whole act.
3 & 4 Vict. c. 73	Friendly Societies Act 1840	An Act passed in the Session of Parliament held in the Third and Fourth Years of Her present Majesty, intituled An Act to explain and amend the Acts relating to Friendly Societies.	The whole act.
9 & 10 Vict. c. 27	Friendly Societies Act 1846	An Act passed in the Session of Parliament held in the Ninth and Tenth Years of Her present Majesty, intituled An Act to amend the Laws relating to Friendly Societies.	The whole act.

== Subsequent developments ==
Friendly Societies Act 1852
- Act of Parliament
- Parliament of the United Kingdom
- Long title: An Act to continue and amend an Act passed in the Fourteenth Year of the Reign of Her present Majesty, to consolidate and amend the Laws relating to Friendly Societies.
- Citation: 15 & 16 Vict. c. 65

Dates
- Royal assent: 30 June 1852
- Commencement: 30 June 1852 (Note: Section 1.)
- Repealed: 1 August 1855
Other legislation
Amends	Friendly Societies Act 1850
Repealed by	Friendly Societies Act 1855

Status: Repealed

Text of statute as originally enacted

The whole act was continued until the end of the next session of parliament after 1 October 1853 by section 4 of the Friendly Societies Act 1852 (15 & 16 Vict. c. 65).

The whole act was repealed by section 1 of, and the first schedule to, the Friendly Societies Act 1855 (18 & 19 Vict. c. 63), which came into force on 1 August 1855.

The acts repealed by the act were again repealed by the Friendly Societies Act 1855 (18 & 19 Vict. c. 63), which extended to the Channel Islands and the Isle of Man.
