= Infants' Property Act 1830 =

Act of the Parliament of the United Kingdom

Infants' Property Act 1830 (Note: The citation of this act by this short title was authorised by section 1 of, and the first schedule to, the Short Titles Act 1896. Due to the repeal of those provisions it is now authorised by section 19(2) of the Interpretation Act 1978.)
- Act of Parliament
- Parliament of the United Kingdom
- Long title: An Act for consolidating and amending the Laws relating to Property belonging to Infants, Femes Coverts, Idiots, Lunatics, and Persons of unsound Mind.
- Citation: 11 Geo. 4 & 1 Will. 4. c. 65
- Territorial extent: England and Wales; Ireland; (Note: Section 36.)

Dates
- Royal assent: 23 July 1830
- Commencement: 23 July 1830 (Note: The Acts of Parliament (Commencement) Act 1793.)
- Repealed: England and Wales: 1 January 1926
Other legislation
Repeals/revokes	Copyholds Act 1722; Infants, Lunatics, etc. Act 1756; Lunacy Act 1771; Estates of Lunatics Act 1803; Recoveries in Copyhold, etc., Courts Act 1807; Common Recoveries, etc. Act 1819; Lunatics' Estates Act 1828
Amended by	Infants' Property (Ireland) Act 1835; Lunacy Regulation Act 1853; Statute Law Revision Act 1873; Statute Law Revision (Northern Ireland) Act 1980
Repealed by	England and Wales: Law of Property (Amendment) Act 1924
Relates to	Transfer of Trust Estates Act 1830

Status: Partially repealed

Text of statute as originally enacted

The Infants' Property Act 1830 (11 Geo. 4 & 1 Will. 4. c. 65) is an act of the Parliament of the United Kingdom that consolidated enactments relating to property belonging to children, married women and the mentally ill in the United Kingdom.

== Provisions ==
Section 1 of the act repealed 9 enactments, listed in that section.

Citation	Short title	Description	Extent of repeal
11 Anne c. 3 (I)	N/A	An Act passed in the Parliament of Ireland in the Eleventh Year of the Reign of Queen Anne, intituled An Act to enable Guardians and others to renew Leases for Lives.	The whole act.
9 Geo. 1. c. 29	Copyholds Act 1722	An Act passed in the Ninth Year of the Reign of King George the First, intituled An Act to enable Lords of Manors more easily to recover their Fines, and to exempt Infants and Femes Covert from Forfeitures of their Copyhold Estates in particular Cases.	The whole act.
29 Geo. 2. c. 31	Infants, Lunatics, etc. Act 1756	An Act passed in the Twenty-ninth Year of the Reign of King George the Second, intituled An Act to enable Infants, Lunatics, and Femes Covert to surrender Leases, in order to renew the same.	The whole act.
11 Geo. 3. c. 20	Lunacy Act 1771	An Act passed in the Eleventh Year of the Reign ofKing George the Third, intituled An Act to enable Lunatics entitled to renew Leases, their Guardians and Committees, to accept of Surrenders of old Leases, and grant new ones.	The whole act.
43 Geo. 3. c. 75	Estates of Lunatics Act 1803	An Act passed in the Forty-third Year of the Reign of King George the Third, intituled An Act to authorize the Sale or Mortgages gage of the Estates of Persons found Lunatic by Inquisition in England or Ireland respectively, and the granting of Leases of the same	The whole act.
47 Geo. 3 Sess. 2. c. 8	Recoveries in Copyhold, etc., Courts Act 1807	An Act passed in the Forty- seventh Year of the Reign of King George the Third, intituled An Act concerning Common Recoveries suffered in Copyhold or Customary Courts by Attorney.	The whole act.
59 Geo. 3. c. 80	Common Recoveries, etc. Act 1819	An Act passed in the Fifty-ninth Year of the Reign ofKing George the Third, intituled AnAct concerning Common Recoveries to be suffered by Attorney in Courts of ancient Demesne, and to explain an Act of His present Majesty relative to the Sale or mortgaging of Estates of Lunatics.	The whole act.
6 Geo. 4. c. 74	Infants, Lunatics, etc. Act 1825	An Act passed in the Sixth Year of the Reign of His late Majesty King George the Fourth, intituled An Act for consolidating and amending the Laws relating to Conveyances and Transfers of Estates and Funds vested in Trustees who are Infants, Idiots , Lunatics, or Trustees of unsound Mind, or who cannot be compelled or refuse to act; and also the Laws relating to Stocks and Securities belonging to Infants, Idiots, Lunatics, and Persons of unsound Mind.	As far as relates "to Stocks, Funds, Annuites, and Securities, belonging beneficially to Persons being Infants, Idiots, Lunatics, of unsound Mind". (Note: The rest of the act had been repealed by the Transfer of Trust Estates Act 1830 (11 Geo. 4 & 1 Will. 4. c. 60).)
9 Geo. 4. c. 78	Lunatics' Estates Act 1828	An Act passed in the Ninth Year of the Reign of His said late Majesty, intituled An Act for extending the Acts passed in the Forty-third and Fifty-ninth Years of the Reign of His late Majesty King George the Third, for the Sale and Mortgage of Estates ofPersons found Lunatics by Inquisition taken in England and Ireland, so as to authorize such Sale and Mortgage for other Purposes; and for rendering Inquisitions or Commissions of Lunacy taken in England available in Ireland, and like Inquisitions taken in Ireland available in England.	The whole act.

== Subsequent developments ==
The act was extended to Ireland by the Infants' Property (Ireland) Act 1835 (5 & 6 Will. 4. c. 17).

The whole act was repealed for England and Wales by sections 10 and 12(3) of, and the tenth schedule to, the Law of Property (Amendment) Act 1924 (15 & 16 Geo. 5. c. 5), which came into force on 1 January 1926.
