= Friendly Societies Act 1855 =

Act of the Parliament of the United Kingdom

- Act of Parliament
- Parliament of the United Kingdom
- Long title: An Act to consolidate and amend the Law relating to Friendly Societies.
- Citation: 18 & 19 Vict. c. 63
- Introduced by: Thomas Sotheron MP (Commons); Edward Portman, 1st Viscount Portman (Lords)
- Territorial extent: Great Britain; Ireland; Channel Islands; Isle of Man; (Note: Section 50.)

Dates
- Royal assent: 23 July 1855
- Commencement: 1 August 1855 (Note: Section 51.)
- Repealed: 1 January 1876
Other legislation
Amends	See § Repealed enactments
Repeals/revokes	See § Repealed enactments
Repealed by	Friendly Societies Act 1875
Relates to	Friendly Societies Act 1829; Friendly Societies Act 1850; Friendly Societies Act 1875; Friendly Societies Act 1896

Status: Repealed

History of passage through Parliament

Records of Parliamentary debate relating to the statute from Hansard

Text of statute as originally enacted

The Friendly Societies Act 1855 (18 & 19 Vict. c. 63) was an act of the Parliament of the United Kingdom that consolidated and amended enactments relating to friendly societies in the United Kingdom.

== Passage ==
Leave to bring in the Friendly Societies Bill to the House of Commons was granted to Thomas Sotheron MP, John Bonham-Carter MP and Charles Adderley MP on 26 January 1855. The bill had its first reading in the House of Commons on 17 January 1855, presented by Thomas Sotheron MP. The bill had its second reading in the House of Commons on 17 January 1855 and was committed to a committee of the whole house, which met on 14 March 1855 and reported on 28 March 1855, with amendments. The amended bill was considered by the committee of the whole house, which met on 28 March 1855 and reported on 28 March 1829. The amended bill was considered by the committee of the whole house, which met and reported on 28 April 1855, with amendments. The amended bill was considered by the committee of the whole house, which met and reported on 8 June 1855, with amendments. The amended bill had its third reading in the House of Commons on 8 June 1855 and passed, without amendments.

The bill had its first reading in the House of Lords on 11 June 1855. The bill had its second reading in the House of Lords on 19 June 1855, introduced by Edward Portman, 1st Viscount Portman and was committed to a committee of the whole house, which met and reported on 26 June 1855, with amendments. The amended bill had its third reading in the House of Lords on 6 July 1855 and passed, with amendments.

The amended bill was considered and agreed to by the House of Commons on 16 July 1855.

The bill was granted royal assent on 23 July 1855.

== Provisions ==
=== Repealed enactments ===
Section 1 of the act repealed 18 enactments, listed in the first schedule to the act. Section 1 of the act also provided that the repeals would not affect anything done before the repeals.

Section 2 of the act provided that every society incorporated under previous acts would continue to be valid.

Section 3 of the act provided that all contracts and engagements under previous acts would continue to be in force.

Citation	Short Title	Title	Extent of Repeal
33 Geo. 3. c. 54	Friendly Societies Act 1793	An Act for the Encouragement and Relief of Friendly Societies.	The whole act. (Note: This act was already repealed by Friendly Societies Act 1829 (10 Geo. 4. c. 56).)
35 Geo. 3. c. 111	Friendly Societies Act 1795	An Act for more effectually carrying into execution an Act made in the Thirty-third Year of the Reign of His present Majesty, intituled "An Act for the Encouragement and Relief of Friendly Societies," and for extending so much of the Powers thereof as relates to the framing Rules and Regulations for the better Management of such Societies, and the Appointment of Treasurers to other Institutions of charitable Nature.	The whole act. (Note: This act was already repealed by Friendly Societies Act 1829 (10 Geo. 4. c. 56).)
36 Geo. 3. c. 68 (I)	Friendly Societies Act 1796	An Act for the Encouragement and Relief of Friendly Societies.	The whole act. (Note: This act was already repealed by Friendly Societies Act 1829 (10 Geo. 4. c. 56).)
43 Geo. 3. c. 111	Friendly Societies Act 1803	An Act for enabling Friendly Societies intended to be established under an Act passed in the Thirty-third Year of the Reign of His present Majesty to rectify Mistakes made in the Registry of their Rules.	The whole act. (Note: This act was already repealed by Friendly Societies Act 1829 (10 Geo. 4. c. 56).)
49 Geo. 3. c. 58	Friendly Societies (Ireland) Act 1809	An Act to explain and render more effectual an Act passed in the Parliament of Ireland, in the Thirty-sixth Year of His present Majesty's Reign for the Encouragement and Relief of Friendly Societies.	The whole act.
49 Geo. 3. c. 125	Friendly Societies Act 1809	An Act to amend an Act made in the Thirty-third Year of His present Majesty for the Encouragement and Relief of Friendly Societies.	The whole act. (Note: This act was already repealed by Friendly Societies Act 1829 (10 Geo. 4. c. 56).)
59 Geo. 3. c. 128	Friendly Societies Act 1819	An Act for further Protection and Encouragement of Friendly Societies, and for preventing Frauds and Abuses therein.	The whole act. (Note: This act was already repealed by Friendly Societies Act 1829 (10 Geo. 4. c. 56).)
6 Geo. 4. c. 74	Infants, Lunatics, etc. Act 1825	An Act for consolidating and amending the Laws relating to Conveyances and Transfers of Estates and Funds vested in Trustees who are Infants, Idiots, Lunatics, or Trustees of unsound Mind, or who cannot be compelled or refuse to act; and also the Laws relating to Stocks and Securities belonging to Infants, Idiots, Lunatics, and Persons of unsound Mind.	So much of Section 11 as relates to Friendly Societies. (Note: This act was already repealed by Friendly Societies Act 1829 (10 Geo. 4. c. 56).)
10 Geo. 4. c. 56	Friendly Societies Act 1829	An Act to consolidate and amend the Laws relating to Friendly Societies.	The whole act.
2 & 3 Will. 4. c. 37 (Note: Incorrectly cited as "2 W. 4. c. 37".)	Friendly Societies Act, 1832	An Act to amend an Act of the Tenth Year of His late Majesty King George the Fourth, by extending the Time within which pre-existing Societies must conform to the Provisions of that Act.	The whole act.
4 & 5 W. 4. c. 40	Friendly Societies Act 1834	An Act to amend an Act of the Tenth Year of His late Majesty King George the Fourth, to consolidate and amend the Laws relating to Friendly Societies.	The whole act.
3 & 4 Vict. c. 73	Friendly Societies Act 1840	An Act to explain and amend the Acts relating to Friendly Societies.	The whole act.
9 & 10 Vict. c. 27	Friendly Societies Act 1846	An Act to amend the Laws relating to Friendly Societies.	The whole act.
13 & 14 Vict. c. 115	Friendly Societies Act 1850	An Act to consolidate and amend the Laws relating to Friendly Societies.	The whole act.
15 & 16 Vict. c. 65	Friendly Societies Act 1852	An Act to continue and amend an Act passed in the Fourteenth Year of the Reign of Her present Majesty, to consolidate and amend the Laws relating to Friendly Societies.	The whole act.
16 & 17 Vict. c. 123	Investments of Friendly Societies Act 1853	An Act to amend the Laws relating to the Investments of Friendly Societies.	The whole act.
17 & 18 Vict. c. 50	Savings Banks and Friendly Societies Act 1854	An Act to continue an Act of the Twelfth Year of Her present Majesty, for amending the Laws relating to Savings Banks in Ireland, and to authorize Friendly Societies to invest the whole of their Funds in Savings Banks.	Section 2.
17 & 18 Vict. c. 101	Friendly Societies Act 1854	An Act to continue and amend the Acts now in force relating to Friendly Societies.	The whole act.

== Subsequent developments ==
The whole act was repealed by section 5 of, and the first schedule to, the Friendly Societies Act 1875 (38 & 39 Vict. c. 60), which consolidated and amended enactments relating to friendly societies.
