= Infants, Lunatics, etc. Act 1825 =

Act of the Parliament of the United Kingdom

Infants, Lunatics, etc. Act 1825 (Note: The citation of this act by this short title was authorised by section 1 of, and the first schedule to, the Short Titles Act 1896. Due to the repeal of those provisions it is now authorised by section 19(2) of the Interpretation Act 1978.)
- Act of Parliament
- Parliament of the United Kingdom
- Long title: An Act for consolidating and amending the Laws relating to Conveyances and Transfers of Estates and Funds vested in Trustees, who are Infants, Idiots, Lunatics or Trustees of unsound Mind, or who cannot be compelled or refuse to act; and also the Laws relating to Stocks and Securities belonging to Infants, Idiots, Lunatics and Persons of unsound Mind.
- Citation: 6 Geo. 4. c. 74
- Territorial extent: United Kingdom

Dates
- Royal assent: 27 June 1825
- Commencement: 27 June 1825 (Note: The Acts of Parliament (Commencement) Act 1793.)
- Repealed: 23 July 1830
Other legislation
Amends	See § Repealed enactments
Repeals/revokes	See § Repealed enactments
Repealed by	Transfer of Trust Estates Act 1830; Infants' Property Act 1830

Status: Repealed

Text of statute as originally enacted

The Infants, Lunatics, etc. Act 1825 (6 Geo. 4. c. 74) was an act of the Parliament of the United Kingdom that consolidated and amended the law relating to the transfer of trust estates and to stocks and securities held by infants, idiots, lunatics and persons of unsound mind.

== Provisions ==
=== Repealed enactments ===
Section 1 of the act repealed 9 enactments, listed in that section.

Citation	Short title	Description	Extent of repeal
7 Ann. c. 19	Trust or Mortgage Estates Act 1708	An Act to enable Infants who are seised or possessed of Estates in Fee, in Trust, or by way of Mortgage, to make Conveyances of such Estates.	The whole act.
4 Geo. 3. c. 16	Infant Trustees and Mortgages Act 1763	An Act to enable Infants who are seised of Lands, Tenements, or Hereditaments within the Duchy of Lancaster, or the Counties Palatine of Chester, Lancaster, or Durham, or the Principality of Wales, in Fee, or for the Life or Lives of One or more other Person or Persons, in Trust, or by way of Mortgage, to make Conveyances of such Estates by Order of the Court of the Duchy Chamber of Lancaster, of the Court of Exchequer of the County Palatine of Chester, of the Court of Chancery of the County Palatine of Lancaster, of the Court of Chancery of the County Palatine of Durham, and of the Courts of Great Sessions in the Principality of Wales.	The whole act.
4 Geo. 2. c. 10	Lunatics Act 1730	An Act to enable Idiots and Lunatics who are seized or possessed of Estates in Fee, or for Lives or Terms of Years, in Trust or by way of Mortgage, to make Conveyances, Surrenders, or Assignments of such Estates.	The whole act.
1 & 2 Geo. 4. c. 114	Lunatics Act 1821	An Act for the Conveyance, Surrender, and Assignment of Estates in Fee, for Lives or Terms of Years, which shall be vested in Trust, or by way of Mortgage, in Idiots and Lunatics not having been found such by Inquisition.	The whole act.
36 Geo. 3. c. 90	Bank of England Stock Act 1796	An Act for the Relief of Persons equitably and beneficially entitled to or interested in the several Stocks and Annuities transferrable at the Bank of England.	The whole act.
52 Geo. 3. c. 32	Infant Suitors in Equity Entitled to Stock Act 1812	An Act for the Relief of Infant Suitors in Courts of Equity, entitled to Stock or Annuities in any of the Public or other Funds transferrable at the Bank of England.	The whole act.
52 Geo. 3. c. 158	Relief as to Transferable Stocks, etc. Act 1812	An Act to extend the Provisions of an Act passed in the Thirty-sixth Year of the Reign of His present Majesty, for the Relief of Persons equitably entitled to Stocks and Annuities transferrable at the Bank of England, and of an Act passed in the present Session, for the Relief of Infant Suitors entitled to the like Stocks and Annuities, to all other transferrable Stocks and Funds.	The whole act.
57 Geo. 3. c. 39	Charities, etc. (England) Act 1817	An Act to extend certain Provisions of the Acts of the Thirty-sixth and Fifty-second Years of the Reign of His present Majesty, to Matters of Charity and Friendly Societies.	The whole act.
1 & 2 Geo. 4. c. 15	Stocks, etc., of Lunatics Act 1821	An Act to authorize the Transfer of Stocks and Payment of Dividends of Lunatics residing out of England.	The whole act.

== Subsequent developments ==
The whole act was repealed by section 1 of the Transfer of Trust Estates Act 1830 (11 Geo. 4 & 1 Will. 4. c. 60), except so far as it related to stocks, funds, annuities and securities belonging beneficially to infants, idiots, lunatics or persons of unsound mind. The remaining provisions were repealed by section 1 of the Infants' Property Act 1830 (c. 65). Both acts came into force on 23 July 1830.
