= List of acts of the Parliament of the United Kingdom from 1829 =

This is a complete list of acts of the Parliament of the United Kingdom for the year 1829.

Note that the first parliament of the United Kingdom was held in 1801; parliaments between 1707 and 1800 were either parliaments of Great Britain or of Ireland). For acts passed up until 1707, see the list of acts of the Parliament of England and the list of acts of the Parliament of Scotland. For acts passed from 1707 to 1800, see the list of acts of the Parliament of Great Britain. See also the list of acts of the Parliament of Ireland.

For acts of the devolved parliaments and assemblies in the United Kingdom, see the list of acts of the Scottish Parliament, the list of acts of the Northern Ireland Assembly, and the list of acts and measures of Senedd Cymru; see also the list of acts of the Parliament of Northern Ireland.

The number shown after each act's title is its chapter number. Acts passed before 1963 are cited using this number, preceded by the year(s) of the reign during which the relevant parliamentary session was held; thus the Union with Ireland Act 1800 is cited as "39 & 40 Geo. 3 c. 67", meaning the 67th act passed during the session that started in the 39th year of the reign of George III and which finished in the 40th year of that reign. Note that the modern convention is to use Arabic numerals in citations (thus "41 Geo. 3" rather than "41 Geo. III"). Acts of the last session of the Parliament of Great Britain and the first session of the Parliament of the United Kingdom are both cited as "41 Geo. 3". Acts passed from 1963 onwards are simply cited by calendar year and chapter number.

All modern acts have a short title, e.g. the Local Government Act 2003. Some earlier acts also have a short title given to them by later acts, such as by the Short Titles Act 1896.

== 10 Geo. 4 ==
The third session of the 8th Parliament of the United Kingdom, which met from 5 February 1829 until 24 June 1829.

This session was also traditionally cited as 10 G. 4.

=== Public general acts ===
Short title	Citation	Royal assent
Long title
Dangerous Assemblies (Ireland) Act 1829 (repealed)	10 Geo. 4. c. 1	5 March 1829
An Act for the Suppression of dangerous Associations or Assemblies in Ireland. (Repealed by Statute Law Revision Act 1873 (36 & 37 Vict. c. 91))
Duties on Personal Estates, etc. Act 1829 (repealed)	10 Geo. 4. c. 2	6 March 1829
An Act for continuing to His Majesty for One Year certain Duties on Personal Estates, Offices, and Pensions in England, for the Service of the Year One thousand eight hundred and twenty-nine. (Repealed by Statute Law Revision Act 1873 (36 & 37 Vict. c. 91))
Supply Act 1829 (repealed)	10 Geo. 4. c. 3	6 March 1829
An Act for applying certain Sums of Money for the Service of the Year One thousand eight hundred and twenty-nine. (Repealed by Statute Law Revision Act 1873 (36 & 37 Vict. c. 91))
Exchequer Bills Act 1829 (repealed)	10 Geo. 4. c. 4	23 March 1829
An Act for raising the Sum of Twelve Millions by Exchequer Bills, for the Service of the Year One thousand eight hundred and twenty-nine. (Repealed by Statute Law Revision Act 1873 (36 & 37 Vict. c. 91))
Marine Mutiny Act 1829 (repealed)	10 Geo. 4. c. 5	23 March 1829
An Act for the regulating of His Majesty's Royal Marine Forces while on Shore. (Repealed by Statute Law Revision Act 1873 (36 & 37 Vict. c. 91))
Mutiny Act 1829 (repealed)	10 Geo. 4. c. 6	23 March 1829
An Act for punishing Mutiny and Desertion; and for the better Payment of the Army and their Quarters. (Repealed by Statute Law Revision Act 1873 (36 & 37 Vict. c. 91))
Roman Catholic Relief Act 1829	10 Geo. 4. c. 7	13 April 1829
An Act for the Relief of His Majesty’s Roman Catholic Subjects.
Parliamentary Elections (Ireland) Act 1829 or the Irish Franchise Act 1829 (repealed)	10 Geo. 4. c. 8	13 April 1829
An Act to amend certain Acts of the Parliament of Ireland relative to the Election of Members to serve in Parliament, and to regulate the Qualification of Persons entitled to vote at the Election of Knights of the Shire in Ireland. (Repealed by Statute Law Revision Act 1873 (36 & 37 Vict. c. 91))
Quartering of Soldiers Act 1829 (repealed)	10 Geo. 4. c. 9	13 April 1829
An Act for fixing, until the Twenty-fifth Day of March One thousand eight hundred and thirty, the Rates of Subsistence to be paid to Innkeepers and others on quartering Soldiers. (Repealed by Statute Law Revision Act 1873 (36 & 37 Vict. c. 91))
Militia Act 1829 (repealed)	10 Geo. 4. c. 10	13 April 1829
An Act to suspend, until the End of the next Session of Parliament, the making of Lists and the Ballots and Enrolments for the Militia of the United Kingdom, and to reduce the permanent Staff, and regulate the Allowances of Serjeants hereafter appointed. (Repealed by Militia (Voluntary Enlistment) Act 1875 (38 & 39 Vict. c. 69))
Payment of Creditors (Scotland) Act 1829 (repealed)	10 Geo. 4. c. 11	13 April 1829
An Act to continue for Two Years an Act made in the Fifty-fourth Year of the Reign of His late Majesty, (Note: Payment of Creditors (Scotland) Act 1813 (54 Geo. 3. c. 65)) for rendering the Payment of Creditors more equal and expeditious in Scotland. (Repealed by Statute Law Revision Act 1873 (36 & 37 Vict. c. 91))
Indemnity Act 1829 (repealed)	10 Geo. 4. c. 12	13 April 1829
An Act to indemnify such Persons in the United Kingdom as have omitted to qualify themselves for Offices and Employments, and for extending the Time limited for those Purposes respectively until the Twenty-fifth Day of March One thousand eight hundred and thirty. (Repealed by Promissory Oaths Act 1871 (34 & 35 Vict. c. 48))
Court Funds Act 1829 (repealed)	10 Geo. 4. c. 13	13 April 1829
An Act to provide for Monies paid into Court under Acts afterwards repealed. (Repealed by Senior Courts Act 1981 (c. 54))
Naval Officers' Widows' Charity Act 1829 (repealed)	10 Geo. 4. c. 14	14 May 1829
An Act for repealing several Acts relating to the Charity for the Relief of the Poor Widows of Commissioned and Warrant Officers in the Royal Navy, and for substituting other Provisions in lieu thereof. (Repealed by Pay of the Navy Act 1830 (11 Geo. 4 & 1 Will. 4. c. 20))
Navy and Victualling Departments Act 1829 (repealed)	10 Geo. 4. c. 15	14 May 1829
An Act to facilitate the Public Business in certain Cases in the Navy and Victualling Departments. (Repealed by Admiralty Act 1832 (2 & 3 Will. 4. c. 40))
East India Company Act 1829 (repealed)	10 Geo. 4. c. 16	14 May 1829
An Act to continue the Operation of an Act of the Seventh Year of His present Majesty, (Note: East India Officers' Act 1826 (7 Geo. 4. c. 56)) for suspending the Provisions of an Act of His late Majesty respecting the Appointment of Writers in the Service of the East India Company; and to amend the Provisions of an Act of the Forty-seventh Year of His late Majesty, (Note: India Government, etc. Act 1807 (47 Geo. 3 Sess. 2. c. 68)) so far as they relate to the Period of Residence at Hertford College as a Qualification for certain Offices. (Repealed by Statute Law Revision Act 1861 (24 & 25 Vict. c. 101))
Newfoundland Fisheries, etc. Act 1829 (repealed)	10 Geo. 4. c. 17	14 May 1829
An Act to continue, until the Thirty-first Day of December, One thousand eight hundred and thirty-two, certain Acts relating to the Island of Newfoundland, and the Fisheries carried on upon the Banks and Shores thereof. (Repealed by Statute Law Revision Act 1873 (36 & 37 Vict. c. 91))
Care, etc., of Lunatics Act 1829 (repealed)	10 Geo. 4. c. 18	14 May 1829
An Act to explain, amend, and alter the Act of the Ninth Year of the Reign of His present Majesty, (Note: Madhouse Act 1828 (9 Geo. 4. c. 41)) for regulating the Care and Treatment of Insane Persons in England. (Repealed by Insane Persons (England) Act 1832 (2 & 3 Will. 4. c. 107))
Register of Sasines Act 1829 (repealed)	10 Geo. 4. c. 19	14 May 1829
An Act to explain and amend an Act of the Parliament of Scotland, intituled "An Act concerning the Registration of Seisins and Reversions of Tenements within Burgh." (Note: Registration Act 1681 (c. 13 (S))) (Repealed by Abolition of Feudal Tenure etc. (Scotland) Act 2000 (asp 5))
British and Spanish Claims Convention Act 1829 (repealed)	10 Geo. 4. c. 20	14 May 1829
An Act to carry into Execution the Stipulations of a Convention between His Majesty and His Catholic Majesty, for the Settlement of certain British Claims upon Spain, and of certain Spanish Claims upon the United Kingdom. (Repealed by Statute Law Revision Act 1873 (36 & 37 Vict. c. 91))
Assessed Taxes Act 1829 (repealed)	10 Geo. 4. c. 21	14 May 1829
An Act to continue Compositions for the Assessed Taxes for a further Term of One Year. (Repealed by Revenue Act 1869 (32 & 33 Vict. c. 14))
Government of Western Australia Act 1829 or the Western Australia Act 1829 (repealed)	10 Geo. 4. c. 22	14 May 1829
An Act to provide until the Thirty-first Day of December One thousand eight hundred and thirty-four, for the Government of His Majesty's Settlements in Western Australia, on the Western Coast of New Holland. (Repealed by Statute Law Revision Act 1873 (36 & 37 Vict. c. 91))
Silk Duties Act 1829 (repealed)	10 Geo. 4. c. 23	22 May 1829
An Act to impose Duties on the Importation of Silk and Silk Goods, and to allow Drawbacks on the Exportation thereof. (Repealed by Customs (Repeal) Act 1833 (3 & 4 Will. 4. c. 50))
Government Annuities Act 1829 (repealed)	10 Geo. 4. c. 24	22 May 1829
An Act to enable the Commissioners for the Reduction of the National Debt to grant Life Annuities and Annuities for Terms of Years. (Repealed by Government Annuities Act 1929 (19 & 20 Geo. 5. c. 29))
Greenwich Hospital Act 1829 (repealed)	10 Geo. 4. c. 25	22 May 1829
An Act to provide for the better Management of the Affairs of Greenwich Hospital. (Repealed by Statute Law (Repeals) Act 1975 (c. 10))
Greenwich Hospital Outpensions, etc. Act 1829 (repealed)	10 Geo. 4. c. 26	1 June 1829
An Act for transferring the Management of Greenwich Out-Pensions, and certain Duties in Matters of Prize, to the Treasurer of the Navy. (Repealed by Statute Law Revision Act 1874 (37 & 38 Vict. c. 35))
National Debt Act 1829 (repealed)	10 Geo. 4. c. 27	1 June 1829
An Act to amend the several Acts for regulating the Reduction of the National Debt. (Repealed by Exchequer and Audit Departments Act 1866 (29 & 30 Vict. c. 39))
Supply (No. 2) Act 1829 (repealed)	10 Geo. 4. c. 28	1 June 1829
An Act to apply a Sum out of the Consolidated Fund and the Surplus of Ways and Means to the Service of the year One thousand eight hundred and twenty-nine. (Repealed by Statute Law Revision Act 1873 (36 & 37 Vict. c. 91))
Militia Pay Act 1829 (repealed)	10 Geo. 4. c. 29	1 June 1829
An Act to defray the Charge of the Pay, Clothing, and contingent and other Expences of the Disembodied Militia in Great Britain and Ireland; and to grant Allowances tn certain Cases to Subaltern Officers, Adjutants, Paymasters, Quartermasters, Surgeons, Assistant Surgeons, Surgeons Mates, and Serjeant Majors of the Militia, until the Twenty-fifth Day of March One thousand eight hundred and thirty. (Repealed by Statute Law Revision Act 1873 (36 & 37 Vict. c. 91))
Yeomanry Corps (Ireland) Act 1829 (repealed)	10 Geo. 4. c. 30	1 June 1829
An Act to continue and amend the Laws relating to Yeomanry Corps in Ireland. (Repealed by Statute Law Revision Act 1873 (36 & 37 Vict. c. 91))
National Debt (No. 2) Act 1829 (repealed)	10 Geo. 4. c. 31	1 June 1829
An Act tor funding Three Millions of Exchequer Bills. (Repealed by Statute Law Revision Act 1870 (33 & 34 Vict. c. 69))
Excise Act 1829 (repealed)	10 Geo. 4. c. 32	4 June 1829
An Act to enable One or more of the Commissioners of Excise to act for the Dispatch of Business for Scotland and Ireland respectively. (Repealed by Statute Law Revision Act 1873 (36 & 37 Vict. c. 91))
Irish Fisheries Act 1829 (repealed)	10 Geo. 4. c. 33	4 June 1829
An Act to amend the several Acts for the Encouragement of the Irish Fisheries. (Repealed by Statute Law Revision Act 1873 (36 & 37 Vict. c. 91))
Offences Against the Person (Ireland) Act 1829 or the Offences Against the Person Act (Ireland) 1829 (repealed)	10 Geo. 4. c. 34	4 June 1829
An Act for consolidating and amending the Statutes in Ireland relating to Offences against the Person. (Repealed by Criminal Statutes Repeal Act 1861 (24 & 25 Vict. c. 95))
Arrest on Mesne Process (Ireland) Act 1829 (repealed)	10 Geo. 4. c. 35	4 June 1829
An Act to prevent Arrests upon Mesne Process where the Debt or Cause of Action is under Twenty Pounds, and to regulate the Practice of Arrests, in Ireland. (Repealed by Statute Law Revision (No. 2) Act 1888 (51 & 52 Vict. c. 57))
Insolvent Debtors Relief (Ireland) Act 1829 (repealed)	10 Geo. 4. c. 36	4 June 1829
An Act to continue until the End of the next Session of Parliament, and to amend the Acts for the Relief of Insolvent Debtors in Ireland. (Repealed by Statute Law Revision Act 1873 (36 & 37 Vict. c. 91))
Coroners (Ireland) Act 1829 (repealed)	10 Geo. 4. c. 37	4 June 1829
An Act to amend the Laws relating to Coroners in Ireland. (Repealed by Coroners Act (Northern Ireland) 1959 (c. 15 (N.I.)))
Criminal Law (Scotland) Act 1829 (repealed)	10 Geo. 4. c. 38	4 June 1829
An Act for the more effectual Punishment of Attempts to murder in certain Cases in Scotland. (Repealed by Statute Law (Repeals) Act 1973 (c. 39))
Sugar Duties Act 1829 (repealed)	10 Geo. 4. c. 39	19 June 1829
An Act for continuing to His Majesty, for One Year, certain Duties on Sugar imported into the United Kingdom, for the Service of the Year One thousand eight hundred and twenty-nine. (Repealed by Statute Law Revision Act 1873 (36 & 37 Vict. c. 91))
Roads, etc. (Ireland) Act 1829 (repealed)	10 Geo. 4. c. 40	19 June 1829
An Act to continue for One Year, and until the End of the then next Session of Parliament, an Act of the Sixth Year of His present Majesty, (Note: Repair of Roads and Bridges (Ireland) Act 1825 (6 Geo. 4. c. 101)) for providing for the repairing, maintaining, and keeping in Repair certain Roads and Bridges in Ireland. (Repealed by Statute Law Revision Act 1873 (36 & 37 Vict. c. 91))
Butter Trade (Ireland) Act 1829 (repealed)	10 Geo. 4. c. 41	19 June 1829
An Act to amend the Laws for the Regulation of the Butter Trade in Ireland. (Repealed by Statute Law Revision (No. 2) Act 1888 (51 & 52 Vict. c. 57), Statute Law Revision Act 1890 (53 & 54 Vict. c. 33), Statute Law Revision (No. 2) Act 1890 (53 & 54 Vict. c. 51) and Repeal of Unnecessary Laws Act (Northern Ireland) 1953 (c. 5 (N.I.)))
Charitable Loan Societies (Ireland) Act 1829 (repealed)	10 Geo. 4. c. 42	19 June 1829
An Act to amend an Act of the Fourth Year of His present Majesty, (Note: Charitable Loan Societies (Ireland) Act 1823 (4 Geo. 4. c. 32)) for the Amendment of the Laws respecting Charitable Loan Societies in Ireland. (Repealed by Charitable Loan Societies (Ireland) Act 1843 (6 & 7 Vict. c. 91))
Customs Act 1829 (repealed)	10 Geo. 4. c. 43	19 June 1829
An Act to amend the Laws relating to the Customs. (Repealed by Customs (Repeal) Act 1833 (3 & 4 Will. 4. c. 50))
Metropolitan Police Act 1829	10 Geo. 4. c. 44	19 June 1829
An Act for improving the Police in and near the Metropolis.
Justices of the Peace, Metropolis Act 1829 (repealed)	10 Geo. 4. c. 45	19 June 1829
An Act to continue, until the Fifth Day of July One thousand eight hundred and thirty-two, an Act (Note: Police Magistrates, Metropolis Act 1822 (3 Geo. 4. c. 55)) for the more effectual Administration of the Office of a Justice of the Peace in and near the Metropolis. (Repealed by Police Magistrates, Metropolis Act 1833 (3 & 4 Will. 4. c. 19) and Statute Law Revision Act 1873 (36 & 37 Vict. c. 91))
Petty Sessional Divisions, High Constables Act 1829 (repealed)	10 Geo. 4. c. 46	19 June 1829
An Act for more effectually executing an Act of the last Session of Parliament, (Note: Division of Counties Act 1828 (9 Geo. 4. c. 43)) for the better Regulation of Divisions in the several Counties of England and Wales. (Repealed by Statute Law Revision (No. 2) Act 1888 (51 & 52 Vict. c. 57))
Arms (Ireland) Act 1829 (repealed)	10 Geo. 4. c. 47	19 June 1829
An Act to continue for One Year, and until the End of the next Session of Parliament, and to amend, Two Acts made in the Forty-seventh (Note: Possession of Arms (Ireland) Act 1807 (47 Geo. 3 Sess. 2. c. 54)) and Fiftieth (Note: Arms (Ireland) Act 1810 (50 Geo. 3. c. 109)) Years of the Reign of His late Majesty King George the Third, for the preventing improper Persons from having Arms in Ireland. (Repealed by Statute Law Revision Act 1873 (36 & 37 Vict. c. 91))
Sale, etc., of Certain Stocks Act 1829 (repealed)	10 Geo. 4. c. 48	19 June 1829
An Act to authorize the Sale and Transfer of the Stocks or Funds standing in the Books of the Bank of Ireland on account of the Office of the Clerk of the Pleas in the Court of Exchequer in Ireland, and the Payment and Application of the Produce of such Stocks or Funds to the Consolidated Fund of the United Kingdom. (Repealed by Statute Law Revision Act 1873 (36 & 37 Vict. c. 91))
Delivery of Sugar out of Bond Act 1829 (repealed)	10 Geo. 4. c. 49	19 June 1829
An Act to continue until the Fifth Day of July One thousand eight hundred and thirty, the Provisions of an Act (Note: Delivery of Sugar Out of Bond Act 1828 (9 Geo. 4. c. 93) to allow Sugar to be delivered out of Warehouse to be refined. (Repealed by Statute Law Revision Act 1873 (36 & 37 Vict. c. 91))
Crown Lands Act 1829 (repealed)	10 Geo. 4. c. 50	19 June 1829
An Act to consolidate and amend the Laws relating to the Management and Improvement of His Majesty's Woods, Forests, Parks, and Chases; of the Land Revenue of the Crown within the Survey of the Exchequer in England; and of the Land Revenue of the Crown in Ireland; and for extending certain Provisions relating to the same to the Isles of Man and Alderney. (Repealed by Statute Law Revision (No. 2) Act 1888 (51 & 52 Vict. c. 57), Statute Law Revision Act 1890 (53 & 54 Vict. c. 33), Statute Law Revision (No. 2) Act 1890 (53 & 54 Vict. c. 51), Crown Estate Act 1961 (9 & 10 Eliz. 2. c. 55) and Wild Creatures and Forest Laws Act 1971 (c. 47))
Labour in Cotton Mills, etc. Act 1829 (repealed)	10 Geo. 4. c. 51	19 June 1829
An Act to amend the Law relating to the Employment of Children in Cotton Mills and Factories. (Repealed by Labour in Cotton Mills Act 1831 (1 & 2 Will. 4. c. 39))
Masters and Apprentices Act 1829 (repealed)	10 Geo. 4. c. 52	19 June 1829
An Act to extend the Powers of an Act of the Fourth Year of His present Majesty, (Note: Master and Servant Act 1823 (4 Geo. 4. c. 34)) for enlarging the Powers of Justices in determining Complaints between Masters and Servants, to Persons engaged in the Manufacture of Silk. (Repealed by Conspiracy and Protection of Property Act 1875 (38 & 39 Vict. c. 86))
Ecclesiastical Courts Act 1829 (repealed)	10 Geo. 4. c. 53	19 June 1829
An Act to regulate the Duties, Salaries, and Emoluments of the Officers, Clerks, and Ministers of certain Ecclesiastical Courts in England. (Repealed by Ecclesiastical Jurisdiction Measure 1963 (No. 1))
Gaol Reports (Scotland) Act 1829 (repealed)	10 Geo. 4. c. 54	19 June 1829
An Act for directing Reports to be made respecting Gaols in Scotland. (Repealed by Statute Law Revision Act 1873 (36 & 37 Vict. c. 91))
Small Debts (Scotland) Act 1829 (repealed)	10 Geo. 4. c. 55	19 June 1829
An Act for the more effectual Recovery of Small Debts, and for diminishing the Expences of Litigation in Causes of small Amount, in the Sheriff Courts in Scotland. (Repealed by Small Debt (Scotland) Act 1837 (7 Will. 4 & 1 Vict. c. 41))
Friendly Societies Act 1829 (repealed)	10 Geo. 4. c. 56	19 June 1829
An Act to consolidate and amend the Laws relating to Friendly Societies. (Repealed by Friendly Societies Act 1855 (18 & 19 Vict. c. 63))
Charity Commission Act 1829 (repealed)	10 Geo. 4. c. 57	19 June 1829
An Act to continue until the First Day of July One thousand eight hundred and thirty the Powers of the Commissioners for enquiring concerning Charities in England and Wales. (Repealed by Statute Law Revision Act 1873 (36 & 37 Vict. c. 91))
Oran and Drumtemple Act 1829	10 Geo. 4. c. 58	19 June 1829
An Act to repeal an Act of the Parliament of Ireland, of the Ninth Year of the Reign of Queen Anne, (Note: Uniting of Parishes Act 1710 (9 Anne c. 12 (I))) for uniting several Parishes, and building several Parish Churches in more convenient Places, so far as relates to the Parishes of Oran and Drumtemple in the Diocess of Elphin.
Metropolis Roads Act 1829 or the Metropolitan Turnpikes Act 1829 (repealed)	10 Geo. 4. c. 59	19 June 1829
An Act to amend an Act of the Seventh Year of His present Majesty, (Note: Metropolis Roads Act 1826 (7 Geo. 4. c. cxlii)) for consolidating the Trusts of the several Turnpike Roads in the Neighbourhood of the Metropolis, North of the River Thames, and to make and maintain Two New or Branch Roads to communicate with the said Metropolis Roads. (Repealed by Annual Turnpike Acts Continuance Act 1871 (34 & 35 Vict. c. 115))
Appropriation Act 1829 (repealed)	10 Geo. 4. c. 60	24 June 1829
An Act for raising the Sum of Thirteen millions four hundred thirty-eight thousand eight hundred Pounds for the Service of the Year One thousand eight hundred and twenty-nine, and to appropriate the Supplies granted in this Session of Parliament. (Repealed by Statute Law Revision Act 1873 (36 & 37 Vict. c. 91))
Regent Street Act 1829	10 Geo. 4. c. 61	24 June 1829
An Act to amend an Act of the Seventh Year of His present Majesty, (Note: Regent Street, Carlton Place Act 1826 (7 Geo. 4. c. 77)) for extending to Charing Cross, the Strand, and Places adjacent, the Powers of an Act (Note: New Street Act 1813 (53 Geo. 3. c. 121)) for making a more convenient Communication from Mary-le-bone Park.
Disqualification for House of Commons (India) Act 1829 (repealed)	10 Geo. 4. c. 62	24 June 1829
An Act to exclude Persons accepting Offices in the East Indies from being Members of the House of Commons. (Repealed by Statute Law Revision Act 1890 (53 & 54 Vict. c. 33))
Labour in Cotton Mills, etc. (No. 2) Act 1829 (repealed)	10 Geo. 4. c. 63	24 June 1829
An Act to render valid an Act to amend the Law relating to the Employment of Children in Cotton Mills and Factories. (Repealed by Labour in Cotton Mills Act 1831 (1 & 2 Will. 4. c. 39))

=== Local acts ===
Short title	Citation	Royal assent
Long title
St. Katharine Dock Act 1829 (repealed)	10 Geo. 4. c. i	23 March 1829
An Act to amend an Act passed in the Sixth Year of the Reign of His present Majesty, intituled "An Act for making and constructing certain Wet Docks, Warehouses, and other Works, in the Parish of Saint Botolph without Aldgate, and in the Parish or Precinct of Saint Katharine near the Tower of London, in the County of Middlesex," (Note: St. Katharine's Dock Act 1825 (6 Geo. 4. c. cv)) and for extending the Powers and Provisions of the said Act. (Repealed by London and Saint Katharine Docks Act 1864 (27 & 28 Vict. c. clxxviii))
Edinburgh Gaslight Company Act 1829 (repealed)	10 Geo. 4. c. ii	23 March 1829
An Act for enabling the Edinburgh Gas Light Company to raise a further Sum of Money; and for other Purposes relating thereto. (Repealed by Edinburgh Corporation Order Confirmation Act 1932 (22 & 23 Geo. 5. c. vii))
Road from Elton to Blackburn Act 1829 (repealed)	10 Geo. 4. c. iii	23 March 1829
An Act for repairing, improving and maintaining in Repair the Road from Brandlesome Moss Gate, in the Township of Elton, to the Duke of York Public House in the Township of Blackburn, and a Branch Road therefrom, all in the County Palatine of Lancaster. (Repealed by Elton and Blackburn Roads Act 1861 (24 & 25 Vict. c. xx))
Rhayader to Llangerrig Road (Radnor and Montgomery) Act 1829	10 Geo. 4. c. iv	23 March 1829
An Act for making and maintaining a Road from Rhayader in the County of Radnor, to Llangerrig in the County of Montgomery.
King's Lynn Water Supply, Markets and Port Act 1829	10 Geo. 4. c. v	13 April 1829
An Act for more effectually supplying the Inhabitants of the Borough of King's Lynn with Water, and for regulating the Markets, and Vessels using the Port thereof.
Duddeston and Nechells Improvement (Birmingham) Act 1829 (repealed)	10 Geo. 4. c. vi	13 April 1829
An Act for lighting, watching, cleansing, and otherwise improving and regulating the Hamlets or Liberties of Duddeston and Nechells in the parish of Aston, near Birmingham, in the County of Warwick. (Repealed by Duddeston and Nechells Improvement Act 1845 (8 & 9 Vict. c. cxciv))
St. Mary Stratford Bow Parish Officers and Poor Relief Act 1829 (repealed)	10 Geo. 4. c. vii	13 April 1829
An Act for increasing the Number of Vestrymen, and regulating the Nomination and Appointment of Vestrymen and Parish Officers, for the Parish of Saint Mary Stratford Bow in the County of Middlesex, and providing for the better Relief, Maintenance, and Employment of the Poor of the said Parish. (Repealed by London Government (Borough of Poplar) Order in Council 1901 (SR&O 1901/220))
Monmouth County Hall Act 1829	10 Geo. 4. c. viii	13 April 1829
An Act to provide for the Repair and Maintenance of the County Hall in the County of Monmouth.
Staindrop and Greta Bridge Road and Whorlton Bridge over River Tees Act 1829	10 Geo. 4. c. ix	13 April 1829
An Act for building a Bridge over the River Tees at Whorlton in the County of Durham, and for making a Road from Staindrop in the said County to Whorlton, and from thence crossing the said Bridge, to the present Turnpike Road at Greta Bridge in the County of York, with a Branch from Whorlton to the Township of Barnard Castle in the said County of Durham, and another Branch from the South End of the said Bridge to the Turnpike Road from Winston Bridge to Small Ways, both in the said County of York.
Scotswood Bridge over River Tyne Act 1829 (repealed)	10 Geo. 4. c. x	13 April 1829
An Act for building a Bridge over the River Tyne, at or near a Place called Scotswood, in the County of Northumberland, and for making convenient Roads, Avenues, and Approaches thereto, with Branches thereout. (Repealed by Scotswood Bridge Act 1962 (10 & 11 Eliz. 2. c. xlviii))
St. Martin-in-the-Fields (Liverpool) Church Act 1829	10 Geo. 4. c. xi	13 April 1829
An Act for vesting a new Church in the Parish of Liverpool in the County of Lancaster in the Mayor, Bailiffs, and Burgesses of the said Town; and for authorizing the Appointment of Districts for the better Performance of Ecclesiastical Duties within the said Parish.
Imperial Gaslight and Coke Company Act 1829 (repealed)	10 Geo. 4. c. xii	13 April 1829
An Act to alter and amend Two Acts (Note: Imperial Gas Light and Coke Company Act 1821 (1 & 2 Geo. 4. c. cxvii)) (Note: Imperial Gas Light and Coke Company Act 1823 (4 Geo. 4. c. xcv)) of His present Majesty for establishing and regulating the Imperial Gas Light and Coke Company. (Repealed by Imperial Gas Act 1854 (17 & 18 Vict. c. lv))
Hinckley Rates Act 1829 (repealed)	10 Geo. 4. c. xiii	13 April 1829
An Act for better assessing and collecting the Poor and other Rates in the Parish of Hinckley in the Counties of Leicester and Warwick. (Repealed by Leicestershire Act 1985 (c. xvii))
Halifax Parish Dues Act 1829	10 Geo. 4. c. xiv	13 April 1829
An Act for extinguishing Tithes, and Payments in lieu of Tithes, Mortuaries, and Easter Offerings, and other Vicarial Dues and Payments, within the Parish of Halifax in the Diocese and County of York; and for making Compensation to the Vicar in lieu thereof, and enabling him to grant certain Leases of Lands belonging to the Vicarage.
School for the Indigent Blind at Liverpool Act 1829	10 Geo. 4. c. xv	13 April 1829
An Act for establishing and governing an Institution in Liverpool, called "The School for the Indigent Blind at Liverpool;" for incorporating the Subscribers thereto; and also for regulating and supporting a Chapel attached to the said Institution.
Wallasey Embankment Act 1829 (repealed)	10 Geo. 4. c. xvi	13 April 1829
An Act for making an Embankment on the North-west Side of the Leasowes in the Townships of Wallasey and Great Meols in the County of Chester, to prevent the further Encroachment of the Sea, and the Injury to arise therefrom to the Low Lands contiguous, and to the Port of Liverpool. (Repealed by Merseyside Act 1980 (c. x))
Road from Barnstaple to Braunton Act 1829 (repealed)	10 Geo. 4. c. xvii	13 April 1829
An Act for making and maintaining a Turnpike Road from Barnstaple to the Town or Village of Braunton in the County of Devon. (Repealed by Barnstaple and Braunton Turnpike Road Act 1841 (4 & 5 Vict. c. cii))
Okehampton Roads Act 1829	10 Geo. 4. c. xviii	13 April 1829
An Act for amending, altering, and improving the Roads leading to the Town of Okehampton in the County of Devon, and making and maintaining a certain new Road to communicate therewith.
Bodmin Roads Act 1829 (repealed)	10 Geo. 4. c. xix	13 April 1829
An Act for more effectually making and repairing certain Roads leading to and from Bodmin, and certain other Roads therein mentioned, in the County of Cornwall. (Repealed by Bodmin Roads Act 1835 (5 & 6 Will. 4. c. cv))
Wrotham Heath and Croydon and Godstone Road Act 1829	10 Geo. 4. c. xx	13 April 1829
An Act for more effectually improving and repairing the Road leading from the Turnpike Road at Wrotham Heath in the County of Kent, to the Turnpike Road leading from Croydon to Godstone in the County of Surrey.
Road from Harlow Bush Common to Stump Cross Act 1829 (repealed)	10 Geo. 4. c. xxi	13 April 1829
An Act for more effectually repairing, widening, and improving the Road from Harlow Bush Common in the Parish of Harlow in the County of Essex, to Stump Cross in the Parish of Great Chesterford in the same County, and for making and maintaining Two new Lines of Road communicating therewith. (Repealed by Statute Law (Repeals) Act 2008 (c. 12))
Biddenden and Boundgate Road (Kent) Act 1829 (repealed)	10 Geo. 4. c. xxii	13 April 1829
An Act for repairing the Road from the Town of Biddenden to the Turnpike Road from Ashford to Feversham at Boundgate in the County of Kent. (Repealed by Biddenden Turnpike Trust Act 1861 (24 & 25 Vict. c. v))
Stockershead and Bagham's Cross Road (Kent) Act 1829	10 Geo. 4. c. xxiii	13 April 1829
An Act for repairing the Road from Stockershead, at the Top of Charing Hill, to a Place called Bagham's Cross, in the Parish of Chilham in the County of Kent.
Road from Maidstone to Key Street Act 1829	10 Geo. 4. c. xxiv	13 April 1829
An Act for more effectually repairing, improving, and keeping in Repair the Road from Maidstone to Key Street in the Parishes of Borden and Bobbing in the County of Kent.
Chester, Tarvin, Delamere and Duddan Smithy Road Act 1829	10 Geo. 4. c. xxv	13 April 1829
An Act for more effectually repairing and maintaining the Road from the City of Chester, through Tarvin, to the Township of Delamere, and from Tarvin to Duddon Smithy, all in the County of Chester, with the several Branches thereof.
Kipping's Cross and Flimwell Vent Road (Kent and Sussex) Act 1829	10 Geo. 4. c. xxvi	13 April 1829
An Act for more effectually repairing and improving the Road from Kipping's Cross in the County of Kent to Flimwell Vent in the County of Sussex, and certain other Roads therein described.
Middleton-in-Teesdale, St. Andrew Auckland and Egleston Bridge Road Act 1829 (repealed)	10 Geo. 4. c. xxvii	13 April 1829
An Act for repairing the Road from the Hoodgate, at the West End of the Town of Middleton in Teesdale in the County of Durham, to the Gate in the new Inclosures called the Edge, near the Collieries called the West Pitts, in the Parish of Saint Andrews, Auckland, and also a Branch from the said Road, at or near the Head of the Town of Egleston, to Egleston Bridge over the River Tees. (Repealed by Egleston Roads Act 1860 (23 & 24 Vict. c. cxii))
Roads from Percy's Cross and from Wooler (Northumberland) Act 1829 (repealed)	10 Geo. 4. c. xxviii	13 April 1829
An Act for more effectually amending, improving, and maintaining the Roads from Percy's Cross to Milfield Burn, and from Wooler to Bowsdon Burn, in the County of Northumberland. (Repealed by Breamish and Wooler Turnpike Roads Act 1831 (1 & 2 Will. 4. c. xxiii))
Ashbourne and Leek, and Rushton Common and Congleton Roads Act 1829	10 Geo. 4. c. xxix	13 April 1829
An Act for amending an Act of the Seventh Year of His present Majesty, (Note: (7 Geo. 4. c. lxxix)) for repairing the Road from Ashborne in the County of Derby to Leek in the County of Stafford, and from Ryecroft Gate upon Rushton Common to Congleton in the County of Chester.
Prestwich, Bury and Radcliffe Roads Act 1829 (repealed)	10 Geo. 4. c. xxx	13 April 1829
An Act for more effectually repairing and improving the Roads from Prestwich to Bury and Ratcliffe in the County Palatine of Lancaster. (Repealed by Road from Prestwich to Bury and Ratcliffe Act 1832 (2 & 3 Will. 4. c. xcix))
Duchy Liberty and Westminster Liberty of St. Clement Danes, St. Mary-le-Strand, and the Precinct of the Savoy (Land Tax) Act 1829	10 Geo. 4. c. xxxi	14 May 1829
An Act for applying in the Purchase and Redemption of Part of the Land Tax charged upon the District or Division of the Duchy Liberty and the Westminster Liberty of Saint Clement Danes, Saint Mary-le-Strand, and the Precinct of the Savoy, in the County of Middlesex, certain Sums of Stock standing in the Name and to the Credit of the Accountant General of the Court of Chancery.
Lincoln's Inn and United Parishes of St. Andrew Holborn above the Bars and St. George the Martyr, Middlesex Act 1829 (repealed)	10 Geo. 4. c. xxxii	14 May 1829
An Act for confirming an Agreement between the Treasurer and Masters of the Bench of Lincoln's Inn and the Governors and Directors of the Poor of the United Parishes of Saint Andrew Holborn above the Bars and Saint George the Martyr, Middlesex. (Repealed by London County (Borough of Holborn) (Lincoln's Inn) Order 1901 (SR&O 1901/262))
St. Albans Court House Act 1829 (repealed)	10 Geo. 4. c. xxxiii	14 May 1829
An Act for building a new Court House for the Liberty and Borough of Saint Alban in the County of Hertford. (Repealed by Statute Law (Repeals) Act 2013 (c. 2))
Aberdeen Harbour Act 1829 (repealed)	10 Geo. 4. c. xxxiv	14 May 1829
An Act for the Improvement of the Harbour of Aberdeen. (Repealed by Aberdeen Harbour Act 1843 (6 & 7 Vict. c. lxxii))
Liverpool and Manchester Railway Act 1829 (repealed)	10 Geo. 4. c. xxxv	14 May 1829
An Act for enabling the Liverpool and Manchester Railway Company to make an Alteration in the Line of the said Railway, and for amending and enlarging the Powers and Provisions of the several Acts (Note: Liverpool and Manchester Railway Act 1826 (7 Geo. 4. c. xlix)) (Note: Liverpool and Manchester Railway Act 1827 (7 & 8 Geo. 4. c. xxi)) (Note: Liverpool and Manchester Railway Act 1828 (9 Geo. 4. c. vii)) relating thereto. (Repealed by Grand Junction Railway Act 1845 (8 & 9 Vict. c. cxcviii))
Kenyon and Leigh Junction Railway Act 1829 (repealed)	10 Geo. 4. c. xxxvi	14 May 1829
An Act for making a Railway from the Bolton and Leigh Railway in the Township of West Leigh, to the Liverpool and Manchester Railway in the Township of Kenyan, with a Branch therefrom, in the County of Lancaster. (Repealed by Grand Junction Railway Act 1845 (8 & 9 Vict. c. cxcviii))
Warrington and Newton Railway Act 1829 (repealed)	10 Geo. 4. c. xxxvii	14 May 1829
An Act for making and maintaining a Railway or Tramroad from the Liverpool and Manchester Railway, at or near Wargrave Lane in Newton in Mackerfield, to Warrington, in the County Palatine of Lancaster, and Two collateral Branches to communicate therewith. (Repealed by Warrington and Newton Railway Act 1835 (5 & 6 Will. 4. c. viii))
Duffryn, Llynvi and Porthcawl Railway Act 1829 (repealed)	10 Geo. 4. c. xxxviii	14 May 1829
An Act to alter, amend, and enlarge the Powers of an Act passed in the Sixth Year of the Reign of His present Majesty, (Note: Duffryn Llynvi and Porthcawl Railway Act 1825 (6 Geo. 4. c. civ)) for making and maintaining the Duffryn Llynvi and Porth Cavil Railway, and other Works connected therewith. (Repealed by Llynvi Valley Railway Act 1855 (18 & 19 Vict. c. l))
Ryde Improvement and Market Act 1829 (repealed)	10 Geo. 4. c. xxxix	14 May 1829
An Act for paving, watching, lighting, cleansing, and otherwise improving the Town of Ryde in the Isle of Wight in the County of Southampton; and for establishing a Market within the said Town. (Repealed by Ryde Improvement Act 1854 (17 & 18 Vict. c. lxxxiii))
South Shields Improvement Act 1829 (repealed)	10 Geo. 4. c. xl	14 May 1829
An Act for paving, lighting, watching, cleansing, regulating, and improving the Town of South Shields in the County Palatine of Durham. (Repealed by South Shields Improvement Act 1853 (16 & 17 Vict. c. lxxxiii))
Aberdeen Improvement Act 1829 (repealed)	10 Geo. 4. c. xli	14 May 1829
An Act for better paving, cleansing, lighting, watching, and improving the Streets, Lanes, and other Public Places and Passages within the City of Aberdeen, and certain Grounds adjacent; for regulating the Police thereof; and for supplying the Inhabitants with Water. (Repealed by Aberdeen Police and Waterworks Act 1862 (25 & 26 Vict. c. cciii))
Basingstoke Market Act 1829	10 Geo. 4. c. xlii	14 May 1829
An Act for enlarging the Market Place in the Town of Basingstoke in the County of Southampton; and for fixing and regulating the Markets of the said Town; and for establishing a Market for Live Cattle adjoining the same.
Wellington Suspension Bridge and Road (Aberdeen and Kincardine) Act 1829 (repealed)	10 Geo. 4. c. xliii	14 May 1829
An Act for erecting a Bridge over the River Dee, at the Craiglug, in the Parish of Old Machar in the County of Aberdeen, and of Nigg in the County of Kincardine; and for making a Road from Cairnrobin, by the said Bridge, toward the City of Aberdeen. (Repealed by Roads and Bridges (Scotland) Act 1878 (41 & 42 Vict. c. 51))
Staines Bridge Act 1829	10 Geo. 4. c. xliv	14 May 1829
An Act to amend an Act passed in the Ninth Year of His present Majesty King George the Fourth, intituled "An Act for building a Bridge over the River Thames at Staines in the County of Middlesex, and for making proper Approaches thereto." (Note: Staines Bridge Act 1828 (9 Geo. 4. c. c))
Marlow Bridge Act 1829	10 Geo. 4. c. xlv	14 May 1829
An Act for raising Money to defray the Expences of rebuilding Marlow Bridge.
Jamaica Street Bridge, Glasgow Act 1829 (repealed)	10 Geo. 4. c. xlvi	14 May 1829
An Act for rebuilding the Bridge over the River Clyde, opposite Jamaica Street in the City of Glasgow. (Repealed by Glasgow Bridges Act 1845 (8 & 9 Vict. c. cxxxiii))
Exeter Canal Act 1829	10 Geo. 4. c. xlvii	14 May 1829
An Act for altering, extending, and improving the Exeter Canal.
Oxford Canal Navigation Act 1829	10 Geo. 4. c. xlviii	14 May 1829
An Act to consolidate and extend the Powers and Provisions of the several Acts (Note: Oxford Canal Act 1769 (9 Geo. 3. c. 70)) (Note: Oxford Canal Act 1775 (15 Geo. 3. c. 9)) (Note: Oxford Canal Act 1786 (26 Geo. 3. c. 20)) (Note: Warwick and Napton Canal Act 1794 (34 Geo. 3. c. 38)) (Note: Coventry to Oxford Canal Act 1794 (34 Geo. 3. c. 103)) (Note: Warwick and Napton Canal Act 1796 (36 Geo. 3. c. 95)) (Note: Oxford Canal Act 1799 (39 Geo. 3. c. v)) (Note: Coventry and Oxford Canal Act 1807 (47 Geo. 3 Sess. 2. c. ix)) (Note: Oxford Canal Act 1808 (48 Geo. 3. c. iii)) relating to the Oxford Canal Navigation.
Southend Pier Act 1829 (repealed)	10 Geo. 4. c. xlix	14 May 1829
An Act for making and maintaining a Pier at or near Southend in the Parish of Prittlewell in the County of Essex, and for making convenient Approaches to and from the same. (Repealed by Essex Act 1987 (c. xx))
Kincardine Ferry Act 1829	10 Geo. 4. c. l	14 May 1829
An Act to regulate, repair, and maintain the Ferry of Kincardine across the Frith of Forth, and the Accesses connected therewith.
Church of St. Catherine in Liverpool Act 1829 (repealed)	10 Geo. 4. c. li	14 May 1829
An Act for erecting and endowing a Church in Abercrombie Square in the Parish of Liverpool in the County Palatine of Lancaster. (Repealed by Liverpool and Wigan Churches Act 1904 (4 Edw. 7. c. c))
Dublin Gas Act 1829 (repealed)	10 Geo. 4. c. lii	14 May 1829
An Act to alter, amend, and enlarge the Powers of an Act of His present Majesty's Reign, intituled "An Act for establishing an additional Company for lighting the City and Suburbs of Dublin with Gas." (Note: Dublin Gas Act 1823 (4 Geo. 4. c. xxxviii)) (Repealed by United General Gaslight Company's Act 1866 (29 & 30 Vict. c. cxcix))
Newmarket Heath Road Act 1829 (repealed)	10 Geo. 4. c. liii	14 May 1829
An Act for repairing the Road from the East End of the Town of Newmarket, over Newmarket Heath, to the Turnpike Road to Stump Cross, in the Counties of Cambridge and Suffolk, and the Road branching out of the aforesaid Road near the Devil's Ditch, on Newmarket Heath, to the present Turnpike Road to Cambridge. (Repealed by Statute Law (Repeals) Act 2008 (c. 12))
Stonehaven and Parkhead Road (Kincardine) Act 1829	10 Geo. 4. c. liv	14 May 1829
An Act for making and repairing the Road from the Bridge over the River Cowie, near Stone Haven, to the Road along the South Bank of the River Dee, at or near to Park Head or Millbank of Maryculter, in the County of Kincardine.
Tunbridge Wells and Uckfield Road Act 1829	10 Geo. 4. c. lv	14 May 1829
An Act for more effectually repairing the Road from Tunbridge Wells in the County of Kent to Uckfield in the County of Sussex.
East Malling Heath and Mereworth and Hadlow Road Act 1829	10 Geo. 4. c. lvi	14 May 1829
An Act for more effectually repairing the Road from the Brick Kilns on East Malling Heath to Pembury Green, and from Brandbridges to the Four Wents near Matfield Green, and from the said Road into the Mereworth and Hadlow Road, in the County of Kent.
Tunbridge Wells, Wadhurst and Mayfield Roads Act 1829	10 Geo. 4. c. lvii	14 May 1829
An Act for more effectually repairing and improving the Roads leading from Tunbridge Wells in the County of Kent to Swiftsden, and from Frant to Possingworth Great Wood in the County of Sussex, and a certain Piece of Road communicating with the said Roads.
Linlithgow Bridge and Stirling Roads Act 1829	10 Geo. 4. c. lviii	14 May 1829
An Act for making and repairing the Road from Linlithgow Bridge to Stirling, and other Roads in the County of Stirling.
Roads and Bridges in Durham and Berwick Act 1829 (repealed)	10 Geo. 4. c. lix	14 May 1829
An Act for more effectually repairing and otherwise improving certain Roads and Bridges in the Liberties of the Borough of Berwick-upon-Tweed and Counties of Durham and Berwick, and improving the Entrance to the Town of Berwick. (Repealed by Berwick, Norham and Islandshires Turnpike Trust Act 1861 (24 & 25 Vict. c. lix))
Road from Scots Dyke to Haremoss Act 1829	10 Geo. 4. c. lx	14 May 1829
An Act for more effectually making, amending, widening, repairing, and maintaining the Road from Scots Dyke in the County of Dumfries, by or through the Towns of Langholm and Hawick, to Haremoss, in the County of Roxburgh.
Roads from North Queensferry to Perth Act 1829	10 Geo. 4. c. lxi	14 May 1829
An Act for more effectually making, amending, widening, repairing, and maintaining the Great North Roads leading from the North Queensferry, and from the Harbour of Burntisland, both in the County of Fife, by Kinross, to the City of Perth; and also the Road from the said North Queensferry to the Town of Dunfermline.
Tonbridge and Maidstone Road Act 1829	10 Geo. 4. c. lxii	14 May 1829
An Act for repairing the Road leading from Tonbridge to Maidstone in the County of Kent.
Dublin and Dunleer Road Act 1829 (repealed)	10 Geo. 4. c. lxiii	14 May 1829
An Act for more effectually repairing the Road from Dublin to Dunleer. (Repealed by Dublin and other Roads Turnpikes Abolition Act 1855 (18 & 19 Vict. c. 69))
Guildford and Alfold Bars Road Act 1829 (repealed)	10 Geo. 4. c. lxiv	14 May 1829
An Act for repairing and widening the Road from the North End of Dapdon Wharf in the Parish of Stoke next Guldeford, through Guldeford, to Alford Bars in the County of Surrey. (Repealed by Statute Law (Repeals) Act 2013 (c. 2))
Alfreton and Higham and Tibshelf Roads (Derbyshire) Act 1829	10 Geo. 4. c. lxv	14 May 1829
An Act for more effectually repairing the Roads from Alfreton to Higham and Tibshelf in the County of Derby.
Road from Lauder to Kelso Act 1829 (repealed)	10 Geo. 4. c. lxvi	14 May 1829
An Act for more effectually making, amending, improving, widening, repairing, and maintaining the Road from Lauder in the Shire of Berwick, to and through Kelso in the Shire of Roxburgh, to the Marchburn. (Repealed by Marchburn, Kelso and Lauder Road Act 1860 (23 & 24 Vict. c. cxxxviii))
West India Dock Company Act 1829 (repealed)	10 Geo. 4. c. lxvii	22 May 1829
An Act to enable the West India Dock Company to raise a further Sum of Money. (Repealed by West India Docks Act 1831 (1 & 2 Will. 4. c. lii))
Parish of St. Paul Covent Garden Act 1829 (repealed)	10 Geo. 4. c. lxviii	22 May 1829
An Act to repeal several Acts (Note: Saint Paul, Covent Garden (Watching) Act 1735 (9 Geo. 2. c. 13)) (Note: Saint Paul, Covent Garden (Poor Relief) Act 1775 (15 Geo. 3. c. 50)) (Note: Westminster Streets Act 1783 (23 Geo. 3. c. 42)) (Note: Saint Paul Covent Garden Church Rebuilding Act 1788 (28 Geo. 3. c. 83)) (Note: Saint Paul, Covent Garden: Church Repair, etc. Act 1789 (29 Geo. 3. c. 30)) (Note: Saint Paul, Covent Garden (Church Rebuilding) Act 1796 (36 Geo. 3. c. 65)) relating to the Parish of Saint Paul Covent Garden, in the County of Middlesex; and for making better Provision for the Regulation of the Affairs of the said Parish. (Repealed by London Government (City of Westminster) Order in Council 1901 (SR&O 1901/278))
Shrewsbury Water Act 1829 (repealed)	10 Geo. 4. c. lxix	22 May 1829
An Act to explain and amend an Act (Note: Shrewsbury Water Act 1827 (7 & 8 Geo. 4. c. lxxxiii)) passed for supplying with Water the Town and Suburbs of Shrewsbury in the County of Salop. (Repealed by Shrewsbury Waterworks Act 1856 (19 & 20 Vict. c. xlii))
River Weaver Navigation Act 1829	10 Geo. 4. c. lxx	22 May 1829
An Act to alter, amend, enlarge, and consolidate certain of the Powers and Provisions of the several Acts (Note: River Weaver Navigation Act 1720 (7 Geo. 1. St. 1. c. 10)) (Note: River Weaver Navigation Act 1759 (33 Geo. 2. c. 49)) (Note: Weaver Navigation Act 1807 (47 Geo. 3 Sess. 2. c. lxxxii)) (Note: River Weaver Navigation Act 1825 (6 Geo. 4. c. xxix)) passed relating to the River Weaver Navigation in the County Palatine of Chester.
Dumbarton Highways and Bridges Act 1829	10 Geo. 4. c. lxxi	22 May 1829
An Act for further regulating the Statute Labour and repairing the Highways and Bridges, in the County of Dumbarton.
Newcastle-upon-Tyne and Carlisle Railway Act 1829	10 Geo. 4. c. lxxii	22 May 1829
An Act for making and maintaining a Railway or Tramroad from the Town of Newcastle-upon-Tyne in the County of the Town of Newcastle-upon-Tyne to the City of Carlisle in the County of Cumberland, with a Branch thereout.
Croydon Improvement Act 1829	10 Geo. 4. c. lxxiii	22 May 1829
An Act for lighting, watching, and improving the Town of Croydon in the County of Surrey; for providing Lodgings for the Judges at the Assizes holden in the said Town; and for other Purposes relating thereto.
Watling Street Road (Shrewsbury District) Act 1829 (repealed)	10 Geo. 4. c. lxxiv	22 May 1829
An Act for improving and maintaining the Shrewsbury District of the Watling-Street Road in the County of Salop. (Repealed by Statute Law (Repeals) Act 2013 (c. 2))
Dublin and Carlow Road Act 1829 (repealed)	10 Geo. 4. c. lxxv	22 May 1829
An Act for making and maintaining the Road leading from Dublin, through Blesinton and Baltinglass, to near the Town of Carlow. (Repealed by Dublin and other Roads Turnpikes Abolition Act 1855 (18 & 19 Vict. c. 69))
Bilston Turnpike Roads (Staffordshire) Act 1829	10 Geo. 4. c. lxxvi	22 May 1829
An Act for repairing certain Turnpike Roads leading to and from Bilston in the County of Stafford.
Tarporley and Whitchurch Turnpike Road (Cheshire, Salop.) Act 1829	10 Geo. 4. c. lxxvii	22 May 1829
An Act for making and maintaining a Turnpike Road between the Town of Tarporley in the County Palatine of Chester and the Town of Whitchurch in the County of Salop.
Road from James Deeping Stone Bridge to Stamford and to Morcott Act 1829	10 Geo. 4. c. lxxviii	22 May 1829
An Act for more effectually repairing the Road from James Deeping Stone Bridge to Peter's Gate in Stamford in the County of Lincoln, and from thence to the South End of the Town of Morcott in the County of Rutland.
Dudley, Birmingham, Wolverhampton and Streetway District Roads Act 1829	10 Geo. 4. c. lxxix	22 May 1829
An Act for improving and maintaining certain Roads in the Counties of Worcester, Warwick, Stafford, and Salop, called "The Dudley, Birmingham, Wolverhampton, and Streetway District."
Chesterfield and Worksop Road Act 1829 (repealed)	10 Geo. 4. c. lxxx	22 May 1829
An Act for more effectually repairing the Road leading from Chesterfield in the County of Derby to Worksop in the County of Nottingham. (Repealed by Chesterfield and Worksop Road Act 1860 (23 & 24 Vict. c. xxiii))
Swathling, Botley and Sherril Heath Road (Hampshire) Act 1829	10 Geo. 4. c. lxxxi	22 May 1829
An Act for maintaining and repairing the Road from the River at Swathling, through Botley, to the Road at Sherrill Heath in the County of Southampton.
Road from Brampton to Longtown Act 1829	10 Geo. 4. c. lxxxii	22 May 1829
An Act for more effectually repairing the Road from Brampton to Longtown in the County of Cumberland.
Blue Vein and Bricker's Barn Turnpike Roads (Wiltshire, Somerset) Act 1829	10 Geo. 4. c. lxxxiii	22 May 1829
An Act for consolidating the Trusts of certain Roads called The Blue Vein and Bricker's Barn Turnpike Roads, in the Counties of Wilts and Somerset, and for more effectually repairing and improving the same.
Fife Turnpike Roads Act 1829	10 Geo. 4. c. lxxxiv	22 May 1829
An Act for repairing and keeping in Repair the Turnpike Roads in the County of Fife; for rendering Turnpike certain Statute Labour and Parish Roads; and for making and maintaining certain new Roads in the said County.
Bolton-le-Moors and Parr Roads Act 1829 (repealed)	10 Geo. 4. c. lxxxv	22 May 1829
An Act for more effectually repairing and improving the Roads from Bolton-le-Moors to the Turnpike Road in Parr leading from Saint Hellens to Ashton, all in the County Palatine of Lancaster. (Repealed by Bolton and St. Helens Turnpike Roads Act 1860 (23 & 24 Vict. c. cxiii))
Woodbank, Lower King's Ferry and Northop Road Act 1829 (repealed)	10 Geo. 4. c. lxxxvi	22 May 1829
An Act for making a Turnpike Road to communicate with the Lower King's Ferry over the River Dee, from the Township of Great Saughall in the County of Chester, and from the Village of Northop in the County of Flint. (Repealed by Flint and Chester Roads and Lower King's Ferry Act 1835 (5 & 6 Will. 4. c. lxxxviii))
Road from Sheepscar to Meanwoodside Act 1829 (repealed)	10 Geo. 4. c. lxxxvii	22 May 1829
An Act for making and maintaining a Road from Sheepscar, through Woodhouse Carr, to Meanwoodside in the Parish of Leeds in the West Riding of the County of York. (Repealed by Annual Turnpike Acts Continuance Act 1867 (30 & 31 Vict. c. 121))
Road from Cranbrooke to Appledore Heath and Branches (Kent) Act 1829	10 Geo. 4. c. lxxxviii	22 May 1829
An Act for more effectually repairing the Roads from the White Post on Haselden's Wood in the Parish of Cranbrook to Appledore Heath, and from Milkhouse Street in the same Parish to Castleden's Oak in the Parish of Biddenden, and from the Turnpike Road in the Parish of Tenterden, through Rolvenden, to the Turnpike Road in the Parish of Newenden, all in the County of Kent.
Road from Oldham to Ripponden (Yorkshire) Act 1829 (repealed)	10 Geo. 4. c. lxxxix	22 May 1829
An Act for more effectually amending the Road from Oldham in the County of Lancaster to Ripponden in the County of York, and other Roads in the same Counties; and for making and maintaining a new Branch to communicate therewith. (Repealed by Oldham and Ripponden Roads Act 1861 (24 & 25 Vict. c. xxv))
Road from Leeds to Roundhay Act 1829 (repealed)	10 Geo. 4. c. xc	22 May 1829
An Act for more effectually repairing and maintaining the Road from Leeds to Roundhay in the West Riding of the County of York. (Repealed by Annual Turnpike Acts Continuance Act 1867 (30 & 31 Vict. c. 121))
Kinross and Alloa Road Act 1829	10 Geo. 4. c. xci	22 May 1829
An Act for repairing and keeping in Repair the Road from Kinross in the County of Kinross to Alloa in the County of Clackmannan.
Road from Kingston-upon-Hull to Kirk Ella Act 1829	10 Geo. 4. c. xcii	22 May 1829
An Act for improving and maintaining the Road from the Town of Kingston-upon-Hull to Kirk-Ella in the County of the said Town.
Chard Roads (Somerset) Act 1829	10 Geo. 4. c. xciii	22 May 1829
An Act for more effectually repairing and improving several Roads which lead to and through the Town and Borough of Chard in the County of Somerset; and for making and maintaining a new Road from Chard to Drempton in the County of Dorset.
Washingborough and Heighington Inclosures and Drainage Act 1829	10 Geo. 4. c. xciv	22 May 1829
An Act for amending and enlarging the Powers of an Act of His present Majesty, for dividing, inclosing, and exonerating from Tithes the Open and Common Fields, Meadows, Pastures, Fens, Ings, and Waste Lands in the Parish of Washingborough in the County of Lincoln and Township of Heighington in the same Parish; and also for embanking, draining, and improving certain Lands within the same Parish and Township.
Merthyr Tydfil, Gellygare and Aberdare Justice of the Peace Act 1829 (repealed)	10 Geo. 4. c. xcv	1 June 1829
An Act to provide for the more effectual Execution of the Office of a Justice of the Peace within the Parishes of Merthyr Tidvil, Gellygare, and Aberdare, in the County of Glamorgan. (Repealed by Mid Glamorgan County Council Act 1987 (c. vii))
St. Dunstan in the West Parish Church Act 1829	10 Geo. 4. c. xcvi	1 June 1829
An Act for taking down the Parish Church of Saint Dunstan in the West in the City of London, and building a new Church in lieu thereof.
Cheshire Constables Act 1829 or the Cheshire Constabulary Act 1829 (repealed)	10 Geo. 4. c. xcvii	1 June 1829
An Act to enable the Magistrates of the County Palatine of Chester to appoint Special High Constables for the several Hundreds or Divisions, and Assistant Petty Constables for the several Townships of that County. (Repealed by Cheshire Constabulary Act 1852 (15 & 16 Vict. c. xxxi))
North and South Shields Ferry Act 1829	10 Geo. 4. c. xcviii	1 June 1829
An Act for establishing a Ferry across the River Tyne between North Shields in the County of Northumberland and South Shields in the County of Durham, and for opening and making proper Roads, Avenues, Ways, and Passages to communicate therewith.
Kirkcaldy Harbour Act 1829 (repealed)	10 Geo. 4. c. xcix	1 June 1829
An Act for the Improvement, Maintenance, and Regulation of the Harbour of Kirkcaldy in the County of Fife. (Repealed by Kirkcaldy Corporation Order Confirmation Act 1939 (2 & 3 Geo. 6. c. vi))
Morpeth Bridge over River Wansbeck (Northumberland) Act 1829	10 Geo. 4. c. c	1 June 1829
An Act for building a Bridge over the River Wansbeck at the Town of Morpeth in the County of Northumberland.
St. James Clerkenwell (Middlesex) Parish Improvement Act 1829 (repealed)	10 Geo. 4. c. ci	1 June 1829
An Act to alter, amend, and enlarge the Powers of Two Acts passed in the Fourteenth (Note: Clerkenwell (Streets) Act 1774 (14 Geo. 3. c. 24)) and Seventeenth (Note: Clerkenwell (Streets) Act 1777 (17 Geo. 3. c. 63)) Years of the Reign of His late Majesty King George the Third, for paving, repairing, lighting, cleansing, and watching the Parish of Saint James Clerkenwell in the County of Middlesex. (Repealed by London Government (Borough of Finsbury) Order in Council 1901 (SR&O 1901/266))
Kington (Herefordshire) Improvement Act 1829 (repealed)	10 Geo. 4. c. cii	1 June 1829
An Act for lighting, watching, paving, cleansing, and improving the Streets, Highways, and Places, within the Town and Borough of Kington in the County of Hereford. (Repealed by Statute Law (Repeals) Act 1998 (c. 43))
Perth Water Act 1829	10 Geo. 4. c. ciii	1 June 1829
An Act for supplying the City of Perth and the Suburbs and Vicinity thereof with Water.
North Level and Nene Valley Drainage Act 1829	10 Geo. 4. c. civ	1 June 1829
An Act for altering, amending, and enlarging the Powers granted by an Act passed in the Seventh and Eighth Years of the Reign of His present Majesty, (Note: Nene Outfall Act 1827 (7 & 8 Geo. 4. c. lxxxv)) for improving the Outfall of the River Nene, and the Drainage of the Lands discharging their Waters into the Wisbech River, and the Navigation of the said Wisbech River from the upper End of Kinderley's Cut to the Sea, and for embanking the Salt Marshes and Bare Sands lying between the said Cut and the Sea.
Sandwich Gaol Act 1829 (repealed)	10 Geo. 4. c. cv	1 June 1829
An Act for vesting the Appointment to the Office of Bailiff or Verger of the Town and Port of Sandwich in the Mayor and Jurats of the said Town and Port; and for transferring the Common Gaol to the said Mayor and Jurats; and for the building and maintaining a new Gaol for the said Town and Port and its Liberties. (Repealed by County of Kent Act 1981 (c. xviii))
Clarence Railway Act 1829	10 Geo. 4. c. cvi	1 June 1829
An Act to enable the Clarence Railway Company to vary and alter the Line of their Railway, to abandon some of the Branches thereof, and to make other Branches therefrom; and for altering, amending, and enlarging the Powers of the Act (Note: Clarence Railway Act 1828 (9 Geo. 4. c. lxi)) passed for making and maintaining the said Railway.
Wishaw and Coltness Railway Act 1829	10 Geo. 4. c. cvii	1 June 1829
An Act for making a Railway from Chapel in the Parish of Cambusnethan in the County of Lanark, by Coltness and Gariongill, to join the Monkland and Kirkintilloch Railway where the same passes through the Lands of Coats or Garturk in the Parish of Old Monkland and County of Lanark.
Saundersfoot Railway and Harbour Act 1829	10 Geo. 4. c. cviii	1 June 1829
An Act for making a Railway from Thomas Chapel in the Parish of Begelly to Saundersfoot, with Two Branches therefrom, and a Harbour at Saundersfoot, in the County of Pembroke.
Ulster Canal Act 1829	10 Geo. 4. c. cix	1 June 1829
An Act to explain the Acts (Note: Ulster Canal Act 1825 (6 Geo. 4. c. cxciii)) (Note: Ulster Canal Act 1828 (9 Geo. 4. c. xcvi)) for making the Ulster Canal in the Counties of Fermanagh and Armagh.
Bath Roads Act 1829	10 Geo. 4. c. cx	1 June 1829
An Act for amending and otherwise improving several Roads leading into and from the City of Bath, and for making new Branches of Roads to and from the same.
Roads in Dumfries Act 1829 (repealed)	10 Geo. 4. c. cxi	1 June 1829
An Act for making and maintaining certain Turnpike Roads within the County of Dumfries, and the other Highways, Bridges, and Ferries therein; and for more effectually converting into Money the Statute Labour in the said County. (Repealed by Dumfriesshire Roads Act 1865 (28 & 29 Vict. c. clxxx))
Lanark and Dumbarton Roads and Bridges Act 1829	10 Geo. 4. c. cxii	1 June 1829
An Act to alter and amend and continue an Act passed in the First Year of the Reign of His present Majesty, intituled "An Act for making and maintaining certain Roads and Bridges in the Counties of Lanark and Dumbarton." (Note: Lanark and Dumbarton Roads and Bridges Act 1820 (1 Geo. 4. c. lxxxiv))
Road from Southwark to the Kent Road Act 1829	10 Geo. 4. c. cxiii	1 June 1829
An Act for continuing certain Powers to the Trustees of the Road leading from the Borough of Southwark to the Kent Road in the County of Surrey, called Great Dover Street, for the Purposes therein mentioned.
Roads from Hurdlow House to Manchester Act 1829 (repealed)	10 Geo. 4. c. cxiv	1 June 1829
An Act for more effectually repairing and otherwise improving the Roads from Hurdlow House in the County of Derby to Manchester in the County Palatine of Lancaster, and other Roads therein mentioned, in the said Counties and in the County Palatine of Chester. (Repealed by Manchester and Buxton Turnpike Trusts Continuance Act 1860 (23 & 24 Vict. c. lvii) (Note: Incorrectly cited as "Manchester and Buxton Turnpike Trusts Cont. 1860 (c.clvii)" in the Chronological Table of Local Acts.))
Road from Newcastle-under-Lyme to Nantwich Act 1829	10 Geo. 4. c. cxv	1 June 1829
An Act for more effectually repairing and improving the Road from the Bottom of Church Lane, (Note: Church Street, Newcastle-under-Lyme, Staffordshire.) in the Town of Newcastle-under-Lyne in the County of Stafford, to the Road leading from Woore to Chester, near Nantwich (Note: The junction of Newcastle Road and London Road, Nantwich, Chester. 53°03′48″N 2°30′11″W) in the County Palatine of Chester, and other Roads therein mentioned.
Six Clerks and Chancery Inrolment Offices Act 1829 (repealed)	10 Geo. 4. c. cxvi	1 June 1829
An Act to provide for the Repair of the Six Clerks and Chancery Inrolment Offices, and the better Preservation of the Records of the Court of Chancery. (Repealed by Statute Law (Repeals) Act 2008 (c. 12))
East London Waterworks Act 1829	10 Geo. 4. c. cxvii	4 June 1829
An Act for better supplying the East London Waterworks with Water, and amending the several Acts (Note: Shadwell Waterworks Act 1691 (3 Will. & Mar. c. 37 Pr.)) (Note: West Ham Waterworks Act 1747 (21 Geo. 2. c. 8)) (Note: East London Waterworks Act 1807 (47 Geo. 3 Sess. 2. c. lxxii)) (Note: East London Waterworks Act 1808 (48 Geo. 3. c. viii)) relating to the said Waterworks.
Independent Gaslight and Coke Company Act 1829 (repealed)	10 Geo. 4. c. cxviii	4 June 1829
An Act to incorporate certain Persons, to be called "The Independent Gas Light and Coke Company;" and for enabling them to light with Gas certain Parishes in the County of Middlesex. (Repealed by Independent Gaslight and Coke Company Act 1864 (27 & 28 Vict. c. clxii))
Southwark Market Act 1829	10 Geo. 4. c. cxix	4 June 1829
An Act to alter, amend, and enlarge the Powers of several Acts (Note: Southwark Market (No. 2) Act 1755 (28 Geo. 2. c. 23)) (Note: Southwark Market Act 1757 (30 Geo. 2. c. 31)) (Note: Borough Market (Southwark) Act 1823 (4 Geo. 4. c. xxxiv)) passed for holding a Market in the Parish of Saint Saviour in the Borough of Southwark in the County of Surrey; and for granting more effectual Provisions for that Purpose.
Sheerness Pier Act 1829	10 Geo. 4. c. cxx	4 June 1829
An Act for maintaining the Pier at Sheerness in the Parish of Minster, in the Isle of Sheppy, in the County of Kent.
Sheerness Improvement Act 1829 (repealed)	10 Geo. 4. c. cxxi	4 June 1829
An Act for paving, lighting, watching, cleansing, and improving certain Streets and Public Passages and Places at Sheerness in the Parish of Minster, in the Isle of Sheppy, in the County of Kent. (Repealed by County of Kent Act 1981 (c. xviii))
Edinburgh and Dalkeith Railway Act 1829	10 Geo. 4. c. cxxii	4 June 1829
An Act to enable the Edinburgh and Dalkeith Railway Company to raise a further Sum of Money, to make a Branch from the Said Railway to Leith, and for other Purposes relating thereto.
Witham Navigation Act 1829	10 Geo. 4. c. cxxiii	4 June 1829
An Act to authorize the raising a further Sum of Money for completing the Drainage and Navigation by the River Witham, and for amending the Acts (Note: Witham Navigation and Drainage Act 1812 (52 Geo. 3. c. cviii)) (Note: Witham Navigation Act 1826 (7 Geo. 4. c. ii)) relating thereto.
Port of London Act 1829 (repealed)	10 Geo. 4. c. cxxiv	19 June 1829
An Act for altering and amending the Powers of an Act of the Thirty-ninth Year of the Reign of King George the Third, (Note: Port of London Improvement and City Canal Act 1799 (39 Geo. 3. c. lxix)) for rendering more commodious and for better regulating the Port of London. (Repealed by Thames Conservancy Act 1894 (57 & 58 Vict. c. clxxxvii))
Newry Church and Vicarage Act 1829	10 Geo. 4. c. cxxv	19 June 1829
An Act to authorize the Endowment of the Church and Vicarage of Newry, and for other Purposes relating thereto.
Newry Navigation Act 1829	10 Geo. 4. c. cxxvi	19 June 1829
An Act for the Improvement and Extension of the Newry Navigation.
British Gaslight Company Act 1829 (repealed)	10 Geo. 4. c. cxxvii	19 June 1829
An Act to incorporate certain Persons to be called "The British Gas Light Company;" and for enabling them to light with Gas certain Parishes and Places in the Counties of Essex and Middlesex near the eastern Part of the City of London. (Repealed by Commercial Gas Act 1852 (15 & 16 Vict. c. clv))
St. George the Martyr Southwark Improvement Act 1829 (repealed)	10 Geo. 4. c. cxxviii	19 June 1829
An Act for watching, lighting, cleansing, and improving the Roads, Streets, and other Public Passages and Places leading from the Stones End, Blackman Street, to the Fishmongers Almshouses Newington, and from thence, and from Stones End aforesaid, towards Blackfriars, Waterloo, and Westminster Bridges, and the Parts adjacent or near thereto, within the Parish of Saint George the Martyr in Southwark in the County of Surrey. (Repealed by London Government (Borough of Southwark) Order in Council 1901 (SR&O 1901/275))
Lambeth Improvement Act 1829 (repealed)	10 Geo. 4. c. cxxix	19 June 1829
An Act for watching, lighting, cleansing, and otherwise improving the Roads, Streets, and other Public Passages and Places within the District left as belonging to the original Parish Church of Saint Mary Lambeth in the County of Surrey, and the Ecclesiastical District called the Waterloo District, in the same Parish. (Repealed by London Government (Borough of Lambeth) Order in Council 1901 (SR&O 1901/219))
City Canal Act 1829 (repealed)	10 Geo. 4. c. cxxx	19 June 1829
An Act for the Sale of the City Canal, and for other Purposes relating thereto. (Repealed by West India Docks Act 1831 (1 & 2 Will. 4. c. lii))
St. Mary Rotherhithe Rates Act 1829 (repealed)	10 Geo. 4. c. cxxxi	19 June 1829
An Act for better assessing and collecting the Poor and other Parochial Rates within the Parish of Saint Mary Rotherhithe in the County of Surrey. (Repealed by London Government (Borough of Bermondsey) Order in Council 1901 (SR&O 1901/264))
Caithness and Orkney Commons Act 1829	10 Geo. 4. c. cxxxii	19 June 1829
An Act for authorizing a Division of certain Commons in the County of Caithness and Stewartry of Orkney, in which His Majesty has an Interest.
Road from Reading to Hatfield Act 1829 (repealed)	10 Geo. 4. c. cxxxiii	19 June 1829
An Act for more effectually repairing and improving the Road from Reading in the County of Berks to Hatfield in the County of Hertford, and also the Road leading out of the said Road at Marlow to or near the Thirty Mile Stone in the Turnpike Road from Maidenhead to Reading. (Repealed by Reading and Hatfield Turnpike Roads Act 1859 (22 & 23 Vict. c. xi))
Road from Milford through Stainton (Pembrokeshire) Act 1829 (repealed)	10 Geo. 4. c. cxxxiv	19 June 1829
An Act for improving and maintaining the Road from Milford, through Stainton, to Merlin's Bridget and from thence to Cartlet Bridge, in the County of Pembroke. (Repealed by Turnpike Trusts in South Wales Act 1844 (7 & 8 Vict. c. 91))
Langton's Profits (Wood Seasoning Invention) Act 1829	10 Geo. 4. c. cxxxv	19 June 1829
An Act for vesting and securing to John Stephen Langton of the Parish of Langton juxta Partney, in the County of Lincoln, Esquire, his Executors, Administrators, and Assigns, certain Profits and Emoluments for a limited Time.
London Bridge Approaches Act 1829	10 Geo. 4. c. cxxxvi	24 June 1829
An Act for improving the Approaches to London Bridge.

=== Private acts ===
Short title	Citation	Royal assent
Long title
Sculthorpe Inclosure Act 1829	10 Geo. 4. c. 1 Pr.	23 March 1829
An Act for dividing, allotting, and inclosing Lands in the Parish of Scunthorpe in the County of Norfolk.
Bleddington Inclosure Act 1829	10 Geo. 4. c. 2 Pr.	13 April 1829
An Act for inclosing the Farr Heath and Cow Common in the Parish of Bleddington in the County of Gloucester.
Great Hamlet Inclosure Act 1829	10 Geo. 4. c. 3 Pr.	13 April 1829
An Act for dividing, allotting, and inclosing the Commons or Waste Lands in Great Hamlet in the Parish of Glossop in the County of Derby.
Didmarton and Oldbury-on-the-Hill Inclosure Act 1829	10 Geo. 4. c. 4 Pr.	13 April 1829
An Act for inclosing Lands in the Manors Manors and Parishes of Didmarton and Oldbury-on-the-Hill in the County of Gloucester.
North Elmham Inclosure Act 1829	10 Geo. 4. c. 5 Pr.	13 April 1829
An Act for inclosing Lands in the Parish of North Elmham in the County of Norfolk.
Assisting repairs and improvements to Lambeth Palace (Surrey) and extensions and improvements to Addington mansion house.	10 Geo. 4. c. 6 Pr.	13 April 1829
An Act for assisting the repairing, altering, and improving Lambeth Palace, belonging to the See of Canterbury, and the taking down and rebuilding some Parts thereof, and the making Additions to and altering and improving the Mansion House at Addington belonging to the same See.
St. Paul's Cathedral and John Pedley's Estates Act 1829	10 Geo. 4. c. 7 Pr.	13 April 1829
An Act for effecting an Exchange between the Dean and Chapter of the Cathedral Church of Saint Paul in London and John Pedley Esquire.
Lubberly Mead (All Saints, Southampton) Act 1829	10 Geo. 4. c. 8 Pr.	13 April 1829
An Act for empowering the Owners of the settled Shares of a Piece of Land called Lubberly Mead, in the Parish of All Saints, Southampton, late the Estate of Mr. John Fox, to grant Building leases thereof.
Duke of Rutland's Mausoleum (Knipton) Act 1829	10 Geo. 4. c. 9 Pr.	13 April 1829
An Act for making the Site of a Mausoleum erected by the Duke of Rutland in the Parish of Knipton in the County of Leicester, and the Inclosure of Land surrounding it, Parcel of the Extra-parochial Precinct of Belvoir in the same County.
Broadclist Inclosure Act 1829	10 Geo. 4. c. 10 Pr.	14 May 1829
An Act for inclosing Lands in the Parish of Broadclist in the County of Devon.
Brackley Inclosure Act 1829	10 Geo. 4. c. 11 Pr.	14 May 1829
An Act for inclosing Lands in the Parishes of Saint Peter and Saint James Brackley in the County of Northampton.
Sherborne St. John Inclosure Act 1829	10 Geo. 4. c. 12 Pr.	14 May 1829
An Act for inclosing Lands in the Parish of Sherborne Saint John in the County of Southampton.
Monksherborne Inclosure Act 1829	10 Geo. 4. c. 13 Pr.	14 May 1829
An Act for inclosing Lands in the Parish of Monksherborne in the County of Southampton.
St. Lawrence Wootton Inclosure Act 1829	10 Geo. 4. c. 14 Pr.	14 May 1829
An Act for inclosing certain Commonable and Waste Lands in the Parish of Saint Lawrence Wootton in the County of Southampton.
St. Giles, Oxford (Oxfordshire) Allotment Act 1829	10 Geo. 4. c. 15 Pr.	22 May 1829
An Act for dividing, allotting, and laying in Severalty, Lands in the Parish of Saint Giles, in the Suburbs of the City of Oxford, in the County of Oxford.
Milbrook Inclosure Act 1829	10 Geo. 4. c. 16 Pr.	22 May 1829
An Act for inclosing Lands within the Tithing of Hill and Shirley in the Parish of Milbrook in the County of Southampton.
Headingley-cum-Burley Inclosure Act 1829	10 Geo. 4. c. 17 Pr.	22 May 1829
An Act for inclosing Lands in the Manor and Township of Headingley cum Burley in the Parish of Leeds in the West Riding of the County of York.
Elworthy Inclosure Act 1829	10 Geo. 4. c. 18 Pr.	22 May 1829
An Act for inclosing Lands in the Parish of Elworthy in the County of Somerset.
Gunthorpe (Norfolk) Inclosure Act 1829	10 Geo. 4. c. 19 Pr.	22 May 1829
894 19 An Act for inclosing Lands within the Parish of Gunthorpe in the County of Norfolk.
Crondall Inclosure Act 1829	10 Geo. 4. c. 20 Pr.	22 May 1829
An Act for improving Lands within the several Tithings of Crookham and Ewshott in the Parish of Crondall in the County of Southampton.
Corby (Northamptonshire) Inclosure Act 1829	10 Geo. 4. c. 21 Pr.	22 May 1829
An Act for inclosing and discharging from Tithes, Lands in the Parish of Corby in the County of Northampton.
Rose Castle (Cumberland) Act 1829	10 Geo. 4. c. 22 Pr.	1 June 1829
An Act for repairing and improving Rose Castle in the County of Cumberland, belonging to the See of Carlisle.
See of Chichester's Estate Act 1829	10 Geo. 4. c. 23 Pr.	1 June 1829
An Act for enabling the Lord Bishop of Chichester to grant Building Leases of certain Estates belonging to the said See.
Wentworth Inclosure Act 1829	10 Geo. 4. c. 24 Pr.	1 June 1829
An Act for inclosing Lands within the Parish of Wentworth in the Isle of Ely in the County of Cambridge.
Halesowen Inclosure Act 1829	10 Geo. 4. c. 25 Pr.	1 June 1829
An Act for inclosing Lands in the Manor of Oldbury in the Parish of Halesowen in the County of Salop.
Marquis and Marchioness of Londonderry's Estate Act 1829	10 Geo. 4. c. 26 Pr.	4 June 1829
An Act to extend the Power of granting Leases of Parts of the Estates of The Most Honourable Charles William Vane Marquis of Londonderry, and Frances Anne Vane Marchioness of Londonderry, his Wife.
Callan, Coolagh and Knocktopher Inclosure Act 1829	10 Geo. 4. c. 27 Pr.	4 June 1829
An Act for inclosing Lands in the Parishes of Callan, Coolagh, and Knocktopher, in the County of Kilkenny.
York Buildings Company (Dissolution) Act 1829	10 Geo. 4. c. 28 Pr.	19 June 1829
An Act for dissolving the Corporation of The Governor and Company of Undertakers for raising Thames Water in York Buildings; and for vesting the Property of the Company in Trustees, to sell and divide the Proceeds amongst the Stockholders of the Company.
Edward Mynors's Estate Act 1829	10 Geo. 4. c. 29 Pr.	19 June 1829
An Act for vesting the Estates of the late Edward Mynors Esquire, not comprised in an Act of the Fourth Year of His present Majesty, (Note: Edward Mynors's Estate Act 1823 (4 Geo. 4. c. 29 Pr.)) in Trustees, upon Trust to complete a Sale made to the Earl of Chesterfield of Part of such Estates, and to sell the Remainder; and for laying out the Monies arising from the Sale of the same Estates, and also from the Sale of the Estates comprised in the said Act, in the Purchase of other Estates, to be settled to the same Uses.
Reverend John Newport's Estate Act 1829	10 Geo. 4. c. 30 Pr.	19 June 1829
An Act for enabling the Committee of the Estate of the Reverend John Newport to sell Estates at Grantham and Spittlegate in the County of Lincoln.
Aberdour (Fife) Entailed Estates Act 1829	10 Geo. 4. c. 31 Pr.	19 June 1829
An Act for vesting certain Parts of the Entailed Lands of Aberdour in the County of Fife in Trustees, to sell the same, and to apply the Price arising therefrom in the Purchase of other Lands near the Mansion House of Dalmahoy and Estates in the County of Edinburgh entailed by James Earl of Morton, deceased.
William Wheatley Estates Act 1829	10 Geo. 4. c. 32 Pr.	19 June 1829
An Act to authorize the Persons beneficially entitled to the Manors and Hereditaments devised and settled by the Will of William Wheatley Esquire, deceased, to grant Building and Repairing Leases thereof; and to authorize the Trustees therein named to sell certain Parts of the said Manors and Hereditaments, and apply the Money arising therefrom in Manner therein mentioned.
Marianne Lockhart's Estate Act 1829	10 Geo. 4. c. 33 Pr.	19 June 1829
An Act to confirm the Sale of certain Lands in the Parish of Linton and County of Peebles, made by Mistress Marianne Lockhart, for the Redemption of the Land Tax of her entailed Estates, under the Authority of an Act passed in the Forty-second Year of the Reign of His late Majesty George the Third. (Note: Land Tax Redemption Act 1802 (42 Geo. 3. c. 116))
Robert Wynne's Estate Act 1829	10 Geo. 4. c. 34 Pr.	19 June 1829
An Act to enable the Trustees named and appointed in and by or acting under and in Execution of an Act passed in the last Session of Parliament, intituled "An Act for enabling Trustees to sell, under the Authority of the High Court of Chancery, the Real Estates devised by the Will of Robert Watkin Wynne Esquire, deceased, or a sufficient Part thereof, for the Purpose if raising Monies to discharge the several Principal Sums and Interest remaining due on the Mortgages, Debts, and Legacies affecting the same Estates," (Note: Robert Wynne's Estate Act 1828 (9 Geo. 4. c. 37 Pr.)) to sell the Real Estates thereby directed and authorized to be sold, freed, released, and discharged from all and every the Estates, Rights, Title, Interest, Possibility, Claim, and Demand of any Daughter or Daughters of John Wynne Esquire by any future Wife, and the Heirs of their respective Bodies, of, in, to, or out of the same Real Estates, or any Part or Parts thereof, under the Will of the said Robert Watkin Wynne deceased.
Lord Calthorpe's Estate Act 1829	10 Geo. 4. c. 35 Pr.	19 June 1829
An Act for confirming certain Building Leases granted by the Right Honourable George Lord Calthorpe, of Land in the Parish of Saint Pancras in the County of Middlesex.
Moncrieffe's Estate Act 1829	10 Geo. 4. c. 36 Pr.	19 June 1829
An Act for vesting in Trustees the Pier or Wharf of Friarton, and Piece of Land adjacent thereto, in the Parish and County of Perth, and the Lands and Estate of Cappeldrae in the Shire of Fife, belonging to Sir David Moncreiffe Baronet, contained in Two Deeds of Entail executed by Sir Thomas Moncreiffe and David Stewart Moncreiffe, to sell the same, and to apply the Prices arising therefrom in the Purchase of other Lands near the Mansion House of Moncreiffe; and also for amending an Act of the Fifty-ninth Year of the Reign of His late Majesty, (Note: David Moncreiffe's Estate Act 1819 (59 Geo. 3. c. 27 Pr.)) granting Power to feu certain Parts of the said entailed Estates; and to grant further Powers of feuing.
Lyon's Estate Act 1829	10 Geo. 4. c. 37 Pr.	19 June 1829
An Act for enabling the Trustees of the Will of the Honourable Mary Lyon Widow, deceased, to sell the Inheritance of certain Estates in the County of Durham, thereby devised, to raise Money to discharge the Incumbrances affecting the same.
Richard's Estate Act 1829	10 Geo. 4. c. 38 Pr.	19 June 1829
An Act for vesting the Real Estates of Henry Richards the Elder, deceased, in Trustees Sale, for the Payment of his Debts, and for investing the surplus Proceeds of such Sale for the Benefit of his infant Grandson and Heir at Law Henry Hyde Richards.
Randall's Estate Act 1829	10 Geo. 4. c. 39 Pr.	19 June 1829
An Act for repealing certain Parts of an Act passed in the Ninth Year of the Reign of His present Majesty, intituled "An Act for enabling the Trustees under the Will of William Randall Esquire, deceased, to grant Building Leases of Part of the Freehold, Copyhold, and Leasehold Estates thereby devised, and Leases of certain Houses situate in the Parishes of Lambeth, Battersea, Christchurch, and Saint George the Martyr, in the County of Surrey; of Woolwich in the County of Kent; and of Clewer t» the County of Berks; or elsewhere in England." (Note: William Randall's Estate Act 1828 (9 Geo. 4. c. 33 Pr.))
Discharging a covenant entered into between John Weston and Samuel Jackson, and empowering the trustees of the Maze estate to complete certain sales.	10 Geo. 4. c. 40 Pr.	19 June 1829
An Act for discharging a Covenant entered into by John Webbe Weston Esquire with Samuel Jackson Esquire, since deceased; and for empowering the Trustees of the Maze Estate, late of the said Jon Webbe Weston, to complete certain Sales.
John Wilson's Estate Act 1829	10 Geo. 4. c. 41 Pr.	19 June 1829
An Act for authorizing the Sale of certain Estates, devised by the Will of Sir Thomas Maryon Wilson Baronet, deceased, to Uses under which John Maryon Wilson Esquire is first Tenant for Life; and for laying out the Purchase Monies in the Purchase of other Estates, to be settled to the same Uses.
Robert Ferguson's Estate Act 1829	10 Geo. 4. c. 42 Pr.	19 June 1829
An Act for vesting the entailed Estates of Raith and others in the Counties of Fife and Edinburgh, belonging to Robert Ferguson Esquire, in Trustees, to sell the same, or so much thereof as may be necessary, and to apply the Price arising therefrom in the Payment of the Debts affecting or that may be made to affect the said Lands and Estates.
Estate of the London Workhouse Act 1829	10 Geo. 4. c. 43 Pr.	19 June 1829
An Act for enabling the President and Governors of the London Workhouse to sell or grant Leases of the Workhouse and other Hereditaments vested in them, and to purchase other Estates for the Education and apprenticing of Poor Children.
St. John the Baptist's Hospital Winchester Estate Act 1829	10 Geo. 4. c. 44 Pr.	24 June 1829
An Act to enable the Mayor, Bailiffs, and Commonalty of the City of Winchester to convey certain Estates, the Possessions of the Hospital of Saint John the Baptist in Winchester, to Trustees to be appointed by the Court of Chancery; and to enable such Trustees to exercise certain Powers over the said Estates; and to authorize the Major, Burgesses, and Commonalty of the City of Bristol to convey to the said Trustees a certain Sum payable every Twenty-fourth Year under a Grant of Sir Thomas White, and for other Purposes.
St. Paul's Cathedral Estate Act 1829	10 Geo. 4. c. 45 Pr.	24 June 1829
An Act for enabling the Dean and Chapter of the Cathedral Church of Saint Paul in London to grant Building Leases, pursuant to an Agreement entered into with John Ambler for that Purpose.
St. Paul's Cathedral (Barnes) Estate Act 1829	10 Geo. 4. c. 46 Pr.	24 June 1829
An Act for enabling the Dean and Chapter of the Cathedral Church of Saint Paul in London to grant Building Leases of certain Land of the said Dean and Chapter at Barnes in the County of Surrey.
Earl of Jersey's, Vicar of Chesterton's and New College, Oxford's Estates Act 1829	10 Geo. 4. c. 47 Pr.	24 June 1829
An Act for confirming Exchanges of Lands in the Parish of Chesterton in the County of Oxford, made between the Trustees of the Earl and Countess of Jersey and the Vicar of Chesterton, and between the said Trustees and the Warden and Scholars of New College, Oxford.
Hugh Owen's Estate Act 1829	10 Geo. 4. c. 48 Pr.	24 June 1829
An Act to enable the Trustees under the Will of Hugh Owen, otherwise Hugh Bulkeley Owen Esquire, deceased, to sell and convey, under the Direction of the Court of Exchequer, the Fee Simple of the Real Estates thereby charged with the Payment of his Debts.
Rectory of St. Mary, Newington Butts (Surrey) Act 1829	10 Geo. 4. c. 49 Pr.	24 June 1829
An Act for enabling the Rector for the Time being of Saint Mary, Newington Butts, in the County of Surrey, to make certain Confirmations, Leases and Assurances of certain Parts of the Glebe Lands belonging to his Rectory.
Player's Estate Act 1829	10 Geo. 4. c. 50 Pr.	24 June 1829
An Act for authorizing a Settlement of the Freehold and Copyhold Estates, late of Thomas Gregory Player Esquire, deceased, at Aldenham in the County of Hertford, under the Direction of the High Court of Chancery.
Campbell's Naturalization Act 1829 (Note: This act was not printed by the King's Printer.)	10 Geo. 4. c. 51 Pr.	5 February 1829 (Note: Start of session)
An Act for naturalizing Ferdinand Stewart Campbell.
Keighly's Divorce Act 1829	10 Geo. 4. c. 52 Pr.	5 February 1829
An Act to dissolve the Marriage of Henry Peach Keighly, a Captain in the Service of the East India Company on their Madras Establishment, and Judge Advocate General of the Army on their said Establishment, with Anne, his now Wife, and to enable him to marry again; and for other Purposes therein mentioned.
Haynes's Divorce Act 1829	10 Geo. 4. c. 53 Pr.	5 February 1829
An Act to dissolve the Marriage of Daniel Franco Haynes Esquire with Mary his now Wife, and to enable him to marry again; and for other Purposes therein mentioned.
Du Thou's Naturalization Act 1829	10 Geo. 4. c. 54 Pr.	5 February 1829
An Act for naturalizing Antoine Beat Albert du Thou and his Two Infant Children therein mentioned.
Tyrell's Divorce Act 1829	10 Geo. 4. c. 55 Pr.	5 February 1829
An Act to dissolve the Marriage of John Tyssen Tyrell Esquire with Elizabeth Anne his now Wife, and to enable him to marry again; and for other Purposes therein mentioned.
Chappé's Naturalization Act 1829	10 Geo. 4. c. 56 Pr.	5 February 1829
An Act for naturalizing Jean Baptiste Paul Chappé.
Dumas's Naturalization Act 1829	10 Geo. 4. c. 57 Pr.	5 February 1829
An Act for naturalizing Henry Dumas.
Fernandez's Naturalization Act 1829	10 Geo. 4. c. 58 Pr.	5 February 1829
An Act for naturalizing Bernardino Antonio Fernandez.
Campbell's Naturalization Act 1829	10 Geo. 4. c. 59 Pr.	5 February 1829
An Act for naturalising Ferdinand Campbell and Samuel Griffin Campbell, the Infant Sons of Ferdinand Stewart Campbell Esquire.
Ower Moigne Inclosure Act 1829	10 Geo. 4. c. 60 Pr.	5 February 1829
An Act for inclosing Lands in the Tithing of Ower Moigne, within the Parish of Ower Moigne, in the County of Dorset.
Watermillock Inclosure Act 1829	10 Geo. 4. c. 61 Pr.	5 February 1829
An Act for inclosing Lands in the Manor of Watermillock in the Parish of Greystoke, in the County of Cumberland.
Bardwell Inclosure Act 1829	10 Geo. 4. c. 62 Pr.	5 February 1829
An Act for inclosing Lands in the Parish of Bardwell in the County of Suffolk.
Ardleigh Inclosure Act 1829	10 Geo. 4. c. 63 Pr.	5 February 1829
An Act for inclosing Lands in the Parish of Ardleigh in the County of Essex.
Garlick's Name Act 1829	10 Geo. 4. c. 64 Pr.	5 February 1829
An Act to enable John Barber to take and use the Surname of Garlick, pursuant to the Provisions of the Will of John Garlick deceased, late of Moulton in the County of Northampton.
Lindam's Divorce Act 1829	10 Geo. 4. c. 65 Pr.	5 February 1829
An Act to dissolve the Marriage of James Oliver Lindam Esquire with Harriott his now Wife, and to enable him to marry again; and for other Purposes therein contained.
Cazalet's Divorce Act 1829	10 Geo. 4. c. 66 Pr.	5 February 1829
An Act to dissolve the Marriage of Peter Reade Cazalet Esquire with Caroline Wahab his now Wife, and to enable him to marry again; and for other Purposes therein mentioned.
Meyer's Naturalization Act 1829	10 Geo. 4. c. 67 Pr.	5 February 1829
An Act for naturalizing Philip James Meyer.
Stock's Divorce Act 1829	10 Geo. 4. c. 68 Pr.	5 February 1829
An Act to dissolve the Marriage of Arthur Stock with Mary Beauman, otherwise Wahab, and to enable him to marry again; and for other Purposes.
Thorndike's Divorce Act 1829	10 Geo. 4. c. 69 Pr.	5 February 1829
An Act to dissolve the Marriage of Daniel Thorndike with Frances Christiana his Wife, and to enable him to marry again; and for other Purposes therein mentioned.

=== Sources ===
- Simons, N., ed. (1829). "10° Georgii IV". The Statutes of the United Kingdom of Great Britain and Ireland. Vol. The Eleventh. From A.D. 1827, 7 & 8 George IV to A.D. 1829, 10 George IV. London: Eyre and Strahan. pp. 669–896 – via Internet Archive.
- Simons, N., ed. (1829). "10° Georgii IV". The Statutes of the United Kingdom of Great Britain and Ireland. Vol. The Eleventh. From A.D. 1827, 7 & 8 George IV to A.D. 1829, 10 George IV. London: Eyre and Strahan. pp. 669–896 – via Google Books.
- The Statutes of the United Kingdom of Great Britain and Ireland, 10 George IV. 1829. London: His Majesty's Statute and Law Printers. 1829 – via Internet Archive.
- Journal of the House of Commons. Vol. 84. London: His Majesty's Stationery Office. pp. 3–416.

== See also ==
- List of acts of the Parliament of the United Kingdom
