= List of acts of the Parliament of the United Kingdom from 1865 =

This is a complete list of acts of the Parliament of the United Kingdom for the year 1865.

Note that the first parliament of the United Kingdom was held in 1801; parliaments between 1707 and 1800 were either parliaments of Great Britain or of Ireland). For acts passed up until 1707, see the list of acts of the Parliament of England and the list of acts of the Parliament of Scotland. For acts passed from 1707 to 1800, see the list of acts of the Parliament of Great Britain. See also the list of acts of the Parliament of Ireland.

For acts of the devolved parliaments and assemblies in the United Kingdom, see the list of acts of the Scottish Parliament, the list of acts of the Northern Ireland Assembly, and the list of acts and measures of Senedd Cymru; see also the list of acts of the Parliament of Northern Ireland.

The number shown after each act's title is its chapter number. Acts passed before 1963 are cited using this number, preceded by the year(s) of the reign during which the relevant parliamentary session was held; thus the Union with Ireland Act 1800 is cited as "39 & 40 Geo. 3 c. 67", meaning the 67th act passed during the session that started in the 39th year of the reign of George III and which finished in the 40th year of that reign. Note that the modern convention is to use Arabic numerals in citations (thus "41 Geo. 3" rather than "41 Geo. III"). Acts of the last session of the Parliament of Great Britain and the first session of the Parliament of the United Kingdom are both cited as "41 Geo. 3".

Some of these acts have a short title. Some of these acts have never had a short title. Some of these acts have a short title given to them by later acts, such as by the Short Titles Act 1896.

== 28 & 29 Vict. ==
The seventh session of the 18th Parliament of the United Kingdom, which met from 7 February 1865 until 6 July 1865.

=== Public general acts ===
Short title	Citation	Royal assent
Long title
Civil Bill Court (Ireland) Act 1865 (repealed)	28 & 29 Vict. c. 1	3 March 1865
An Act to amend certain clerical Errors in the Civil Bill Courts Procedure Amendment Act (Ireland), 1864. (Note: Civil Bill Courts Procedure Amendment Act (Ireland) 1864 (27 & 28 Vict. c. 99)) (Repealed by Statute Law Revision Act 1893 (56 & 57 Vict. c. 14) and County Courts Act (Northern Ireland) 1959 (c. 25 (N.I.)))
Dublin, Sale of Game Act 1865 (repealed)	28 & 29 Vict. c. 2	27 March 1865
An Act to extend the Powers now vested in Justices of the Peace to grant Licences to deal in Game to the Divisional Magistrates within the Police District of Dublin Metropolis. (Repealed by Statute Law (Repeals) Act 1993 (c. 50))
Industrial Exhibitions Act 1865 (repealed)	28 & 29 Vict. c. 3	27 March 1865
An Act for the Protection of Inventions and Designs exhibited at certain Industrial Exhibitions in the United Kingdom. (Repealed by Patents, Designs, and Trade Marks Act 1883 (46 & 47 Vict. c. 57))
Consolidated Fund (£175,650) Act or the Supply Act 1865 (repealed)	28 & 29 Vict. c. 4	27 March 1865
An Act to apply the Sum of One hundred and seventy-five thousand six hundred and fifty Pounds out of the Consolidated Fund to the Service of the Year ending the Thirty-first Day of March One thousand eight hundred and sixty-five. (Repealed by Statute Law Revision Act 1875 (38 & 39 Vict. c. 66))
British Kaffraria Act 1865 (repealed)	28 & 29 Vict. c. 5	27 March 1865
An Act for the Incorporation of the Territories of British Kaffraria with the Colony of the Cape of Good Hope. (Repealed by Statute Law Revision Act 1893 (56 & 57 Vict. c. 14))
Protection of Inventions and Designs Amendment Act 1865 (repealed)	28 & 29 Vict. c. 6	27 March 1865
An Act for the Protection of Inventions and Designs exhibited at the Dublin International Exhibition for the Year One thousand eight hundred and sixty-five. (Repealed by Statute Law Revision Act 1875 (38 & 39 Vict. c. 66))
General Police and Improvement (Scotland) Supplemental Act 1865 or the General Police and Improvement (Scotland) Act 1865 (repealed)	28 & 29 Vict. c. 7	7 April 1865
An Act to confirm a Provisional Order under "The General Police and Improvement (Scotland) Act, 1862," (Note: General Police and Improvement (Scotland) Act 1862 (25 & 26 Vict. c. 101)) relating to the Burgh of Perth. (Repealed by Statute Law (Repeals) Act 1977 (c. 18))
	Perth.	
Election Petitions Act 1865 (repealed)	28 & 29 Vict. c. 8	7 April 1865
An Act to amend "The Election Petitions Act, 1848," (Note: Election Petitions Act 1848 (11 & 12 Vict. c. 98)) in certain Particulars. (Repealed by Parliamentary Elections Act 1868 (31 & 32 Vict. c. 125))
Affirmations (Scotland) Act 1865 (repealed)	28 & 29 Vict. c. 9	7 April 1865
An Act to allow Affirmations or Declarations to be made instead of Oaths in all Civil and Criminal Proceedings in Scotland. (Repealed by Oaths Act 1888 (51 & 52 Vict. c. 46))
Consolidated Fund (£15,000,000) Act or the Supply (No. 2) Act 1865 (repealed)	28 & 29 Vict. c. 10	7 April 1865
An Act to apply the Sum of Fifteen Millions out of the Consolidated Fund to the Service of the Year One thousand eight hundred and sixty-five. (Repealed by Statute Law Revision Act 1875 (38 & 39 Vict. c. 66))
Mutiny Act 1865 (repealed)	28 & 29 Vict. c. 11	7 April 1865
An Act for punishing Mutiny and Desertion, and for the better Payment of the Army and their Quarters. (Repealed by Statute Law Revision Act 1875 (38 & 39 Vict. c. 66))
Marine Mutiny Act 1865 (repealed)	28 & 29 Vict. c. 12	7 April 1865
An Act for the Regulation of Her Majesty's Royal Marine Forces while on shore. (Repealed by Statute Law Revision Act 1875 (38 & 39 Vict. c. 66))
Drainage and Improvement of Lands Supplemental Act, Ireland 1865 or the Drainage and Improvement of Lands Supplemental (Ireland) Act 1865	28 & 29 Vict. c. 13	7 April 1865
An Act to confirm certain Provisional Orders under "The Drainage and Improvement of Lands Act (Ireland), 1863," (Note: Drainage and Improvement of Lands Act (Ireland) 1863 (26 & 27 Vict. c. 88)) and the Act (Note: Drainage and Improvement of Lands (Ireland) Act 1864 (27 & 28 Vict. c. 72)) amending the same.
	In the Matter of Rathdowney Drainage District, Queen's County.	
	In the Matter of The Silver River Drainage District in the King's County and County of Westmeath.	
	In the Matter of Ballynacarrig Drainage District, in the King's County and Queen's County.	
	In the Matter of the Six Mile Bridge Drainage District, County of Clare.	
Colonial Naval Defence Act 1865 (repealed)	28 & 29 Vict. c. 14	7 April 1865
An Act to make better Provision for the Naval Defence of the Colonies. (Repealed by Colonial Naval Defence Act 1931 (21 & 22 Geo. 5. c. 9))
Indian High Courts Act 1865 (repealed)	28 & 29 Vict. c. 15	7 April 1865
An Act to extend the Term for granting fresh Letters Patent for the High Courts in India, and to make further Provision respecting the Territorial Jurisdiction of the said Courts. (Repealed by Government of India Act 1915 (5 & 6 Geo. 5. c. 61))
Bank of Ireland Act 1865 (repealed)	28 & 29 Vict. c. 16	7 April 1865
An Act to make further Provision for the Management of the Unredeemed Public Debt in Ireland, and for the Reduction of the Interest payable on certain Sums advanced by the Bank of Ireland for the Public Service. (Repealed by Bank Act 1892 (55 & 56 Vict. c. 48))
Government of India Act 1865 (repealed)	28 & 29 Vict. c. 17	9 May 1865
An Act to enlarge the Powers of the Governor General of India in Council at Meetings for making Laws and Regulations, and to amend the Law respecting the Territorial Limits of the several Presidencies and Lieutenant Governorships in India. (Repealed by Government of India Act 1915 (5 & 6 Geo. 5. c. 61))
Criminal Procedure Act 1865 or Denman's Act	28 & 29 Vict. c. 18	9 May 1865
An Act for amending the Law of Evidence and Practice on Criminal Trials.
Metropolitan Main Drainage Extension Act 1865 (repealed)	28 & 29 Vict. c. 19	9 May 1865
An Act to extend the Period for borrowing the Sum authorized to be raised under the Metropolitan Main Drainage Extension Act, 1863. (Note: Metropolitan Main Drainage Extension Act 1863 (26 & 27 Vict. c. 68)) (Repealed by Metropolitan Board of Works (Loans) Act 1869 (32 & 33 Vict. c. 102))
Annual Inclosure Act 1865	28 & 29 Vict. c. 20	9 May 1865
An Act to authorize the Inclosure of certain Lands in pursuance of a Report of the Inclosure Commissioners for England and Wales.
Irish Bankrupt and Insolvent Amendment Act 1865 (repealed)	28 & 29 Vict. c. 21	9 May 1865
An Act to amend the Irish Bankrupt and Insolvent Act, 1857. (Note: Irish Bankrupt and Insolvent Act 1857 (20 & 21 Vict. c. 60)) (Repealed by Bankruptcy Amendment (Northern Ireland) Order 1980 (SI 1980/561 (N.I. 4)))
Herring Fisheries (Scotland) Act 1865 (repealed)	28 & 29 Vict. c. 22	9 May 1865
An Act to amend the Acts relating to the Scottish Herring Fisheries. (Repealed by Statute Law Revision Act 1963 (c. 30))
Land Drainage Supplemental Act 1865	28 & 29 Vict. c. 23	9 May 1865
An Act to confirm a Provisional Order under "The Land Drainage Act, 1861." (Note: Land Drainage Act 1861 (24 & 25 Vict. c. 133))
	In the Matter of Chedzoy Improvement, situate in the several Parishes of Westonzoyland, Chedzoy, Bridgwater, Woolavington, North Petherton, and Middlezoy, in the County of Somerset.	
Local Government Supplemental Act 1865	28 & 29 Vict. c. 24	9 May 1865
An Act to confirm certain Provisional Orders under "The Local Government Act, 1858," (Note: Local Government Act 1858 (21 & 22 Vict. c. 98)) relating to the Districts of Bridlington, Brighouse, Burnley, Henley, Shipley, Wallingford, Llangollen, Ormskirk, Swansea, Tormoham, and Lockwood.
	Provisional Order putting in force the Lands Clauses Consolidation Act, 1845, (Note: Lands Clauses Consolidation Act 1845 (8 & 9 Vict. c. 18)) and the Lands Clauses Consolidation Acts Amendment Act, 1860, (Note: Lands Clauses Consolidation Acts Amendment Act 1860 (23 & 24 Vict. c. 106)) within the District of the Local Board of the Township of Bridlington, with respect to the Purchase and taking of Lands and Houses otherwise than by Agreement.	
	Provisional Order repealing and altering Parts of a Local Act (Note: Brighouse Improvement Act 1846 (9 & 10 Vict. c. ccclxxxv)) in force within the District of the Brighouse Local Board.	
	Provisional Order altering a Local Act (Note: Burnley Improvement Act 1854 (17 & 18 Vict. c. lxvii)) in force within the District of Burnley in the County of Lancaster.	
	Provisional Order partially repealing and altering a Local Act (Note: Henley Bridge Act 1781 (21 Geo. 3. c. 33)) in force within the District of Henley-upon-Thames in the County of Oxford.	
	Provisional Order partially repealing and altering a Local Act (Note: Shipley Waterworks and Police Act 1854 (17 & 18 Vict. c. lxxvii)) in force within the District of Shipley, Yorkshire, and to extend the Borrowing Powers of the Local Board for that District.	
	Provisional Order repealing a Local Act (Note: Wallingford Improvement Act 1795 (35 Geo. 3. 75)) in force within the District of the Wallingford Local Board.	
	Provisional Order for extending the Borrowing Powers of the Llangollen Local Board.	
	Provisional Order for extending the Borrowing Powers of the Ormskirk Local Board of Health.	
	Provisional Order for extending the Borrowing Powers of the Swansea Local Board of Health.	
	Provisional Order for extending the Borrowing Powers of the Tormoham Local Board of Health.	
	Provisional Order for altering the Boundaries of the District of Lockwood, in the Parish of Almondbury, in the West Riding of the County of York, under the Local Government Act, 1858.	
Local Government Supplemental Act 1865 (No. 2) or the Local Government Supplemental (No. 2) Act 1865	28 & 29 Vict. c. 25	9 May 1865
An Act to confirm certain Provisional Orders under "The Local Government Act, 1858," relating to the Districts of Derby, Ramsgate, Oswestry, Bury, Heap, Cockermouth, Matlock Bath, and Bromsgrove.
	Provisional Order putting in force the Lands Clauses Consolidation Act, 1845, within the District of Derby in the County of Derby, for the Purchase of Lands by the Local Board of Health for the aforesaid District for Street Improvements.	
	Provisional Order putting in force the Lands Clauses Consolidation Act, 1845, within the District of Ramsgate in the County of Kent, for the Purchase of Lands by the Local Board of the aforesaid District for Street Improvements and other Works.	
	Provisional Order putting in force the Lands Clauses Consolidation Act, 1845, within the District of Oswestry in the County of Salop, for the Purchase of Lands by the Local Board of the aforesaid District for Drainage and other Works.	
	Provisional Order putting in force the Lands Clauses Consolidation Act, 1845, within the District of Bury in the County of Lancaster, for the Purchase of Lands by the Local Board of the aforesaid District for Street Improvements.	
	Provisional Order putting in force the Lands Clauses Consolidation Act, 1845, within the District of the Middle Division of Heap in the County of Lancaster, for the Purchase of Lands by the Local Board of the aforesaid District for Street Improvements therein.	
	Provisional Order putting in force the Lands Clauses Consolidation Act, 1845, within the Cockermouth Local Board District, for the Purchase and taking of Lands by the said Board otherwise than by Agreement	
	Provisional Order for extending the Borrowing Powers of the Cockermouth Local Board.	
	Provisional Order for altering the Boundaries of the District of Matlock in the County of Derby under the Provisions of the Local Government Act, 1858.	
	Provisional Order for altering the Boundaries of the District of Bromsgrove in the County of Worcester, as constituted for the Purposes of the Local Government Act, 1858.	
Union Officers Superannuation (Ireland) Act 1865	28 & 29 Vict. c. 26	26 May 1865
An Act to provide for Superannuation Allowances to Officers of Unions in Ireland.
Parliamentary Costs Act 1865 (repealed)	28 & 29 Vict. c. 27	26 May 1865
An Act for awarding Costs in certain Cases of Private Bills. (Repealed by Parliamentary Costs Act 2006 (c. 37))
Isle of Man Disafforestation (Compensation Payment) Act 1865 (repealed)	28 & 29 Vict. c. 28	26 May 1865
An Act to authorise certain payments out of the land revenues of the Crown to provide compensation for certain claims in the Isle of Man. (Repealed by Statute Law (Repeals) Act 1973 (c. 39))
Exchequer Bonds Act 1865 (repealed)	28 & 29 Vict. c. 29	26 May 1865
An Act for raising the Sum of One Million Pounds by Exchequer Bonds for the Service of the Year One thousand eight hundred and sixty-five. (Repealed by Statute Law Revision Act 1875 (38 & 39 Vict. c. 66))
Revenue Act 1865 or the Customs and Inland Revenue Act 1865 (repealed)	28 & 29 Vict. c. 30	26 May 1865
An Act to grant certain Duties of Customs and Inland Revenue. (Repealed by Statute Law Revision Act 1875 (38 & 39 Vict. c. 66), Customs Consolidation Act 1876 (39 & 40 Vict. c. 36), Taxes Management Act 1880 (43 & 44 Vict. c. 19), Stamp Act 1891 (54 & 55 Vict. c. 39) and Finance Act 1907 (7 Edw. 7. c. 13))
Public Offices Act 1865	28 & 29 Vict. c. 31	2 June 1865
An Act to enable the Commissioners of Her Majesty's Works and Public Buildings to acquire additional Lands for improving the Site of the new Public Offices in Downing Street and the Approaches thereto.
India Office Site and Approaches Act 1865	28 & 29 Vict. c. 32	2 June 1865
An Act to enable the Secretary of State in Council of India to acquire additional Lands for improving the Site of the India Office and the Approaches thereto.
Vagrancy, Ireland, Amendment Act (1865) or the Vagrancy (Ireland) Amendment Act 1865 (repealed)	28 & 29 Vict. c. 33	2 June 1865
An Act to repeal the Act of the Parliament of Ireland of the Sixth Year of Anne, Chapter Eleven, for explaining and amending the several Acts against Tories, Bobbers, and Rapparees. (Repealed by Statute Law Revision Act 1893 (56 & 57 Vict. c. 14))
Metropolitan Houseless Poor Act 1865 (repealed)	28 & 29 Vict. c. 34	2 June 1865
An Act to make the Metropolitan Houseless Poor Act (Note: Metropolitan Houseless Poor Act 1864 (27 & 28 Vict. c. 116)) perpetual. (Repealed by Poor Law Act 1927 (17 & 18 Geo. 5. c. 14))
Police Superannuation Act 1865 (repealed)	28 & 29 Vict. c. 35	2 June 1865
An Act to amend the Law relating to the Police Superannuation Funds in Counties and Boroughs. (Repealed by Police Pensions Act 1948 (11 & 12 Geo. 6. c. 24))
County Voters Registration Act 1865 (repealed)	28 & 29 Vict. c. 36	2 June 1865
An Act to amend the Law relating to the Registration of County Voters, and to the Powers and Duties of Revising Barristers in certain Cases. (Repealed by Registration Act 1885 (48 & 49 Vict. c. 15), Statute Law Revision Act 1893 (56 & 57 Vict. c. 14), Statute Law Revision (No. 2) Act 1893 (56 & 57 Vict. c. 54) and Representation of the People Act 1918 (7 & 8 Geo. 5. c. 64))
County of Sussex Act 1865 (repealed)	28 & 29 Vict. c. 37	2 June 1865
An Act to make better Provision respecting the Transaction of County Business and the Administration of Justice at Quarter Scions in the County of Sussex; and to confirm certain Proceedings of the Justices of the said County. (Repealed by Statute Law Revision Act 1875 (38 & 39 Vict. c. 66), Statute Law Revision (No. 2) Act 1893 (56 & 57 Vict. c. 54), Justices of the Peace Act 1949 (12, 13 & 14 Geo. 6. c. 101), Statute Law Revision Act 1950 (14 Geo. 6. c. 6) and Criminal Law Act 1967 (c. 58))
Commissioners of Supply Meetings (Scotland) Act 1865 (repealed)	28 & 29 Vict. c. 38	19 June 1865
An Act to authorize the Alteration of the Time for holding Statutory Meetings of Commissioners of Supply in Scotland. (Repealed by Statute Law Revision Act 1893 (56 & 57 Vict. c. 14))
Second Annual Inclosure Act 1865	28 & 29 Vict. c. 39	19 June 1865
An Act to authorize the Inclosure of certain Lands in pursuance of a Report of the Inclosure Commissioners for England and Wales.
Lancaster Palatine Court Act 1865 (repealed)	28 & 29 Vict. c. 40	19 June 1865
An Act to extend to the Court of Chancery of the County Palatine of Lancaster certain of the Provisions of an Act passed in the Session holden in the Twenty-third and Twenty-fourth Years of Her present Majesty, intituled "An Act to give to Trustees, Mortgagees, and others certain Powers now commonly inserted in Settlements, Mortgages, and Wills." (Note: Powers of Trustees, Mortgagees, etc. Act 1860 (23 & 24 Vict. c. 145)) (Repealed by Statute Law Revision Act 1950 (14 Geo. 6. c. 6))
Local Government Supplemental Act 1865 (No. 3) or the Local Government Supplemental (No. 3) Act 1865	28 & 29 Vict. c. 41	19 June 1865
An Act to confirm certain Provisional Orders under "The Local Government Act, 1858," relating to the Districts of Sheffield, Bradford, and Gloucester.
	Provisional Order repealing a Local Act (Note: Sheffield Improvement Act 1818 (58 Geo. 3. c. liv)) in force within the District of the Sheffield Local Board.	
	Provisional Order putting in force the Lands Clauses Consolidation Act, 1845, within the District of Bradford, for the Purchase of Lands by the Local Board of Health of the aforesaid District for Street Improvements.	
	Provisional Order repealing and altering Parts of Local Acts in force within the District of the Gloucester Board of Health.	
District Church Tithes Act 1865 (repealed)	28 & 29 Vict. c. 42	19 June 1865
An Act for facilitating the Annexation of Tithes to District Churches. (Repealed by Pastoral Measure 1968 (No. 1) and Statute Law (Repeals) Act 1974 (c. 22))
Married Women's Property (Ireland) Act 1865 (repealed)	28 & 29 Vict. c. 43	19 June 1865
An Act to provide for the Security of Property of Married Women separated from their Husbands in Ireland. (Repealed by Matrimonial Causes (Northern Ireland) Order 1978 (SI 1978/1045 (N.I. 15)))
(Tyne) Pilotage Order Confirmation Act 1865 (repealed)	28 & 29 Vict. c. 44	19 June 1865
An Act for confirming a Provisional Order made by the Board of Trade under The Merchant Shipping Act Amendment Act, 1862, (Note: Merchant Shipping Act Amendment Act 1862 (25 & 26 Vict. c. 63)) relating to the Pilotage of tho River Tyne. (Repealed by Pilotage Orders Confirmation (No. 2) Act 1922 (12 & 13 Geo. 5. c. xiii))
	Amended Order referred to and confirmed by the foregoing Act.	
Common Law Courts (Fees) Act 1865 (repealed)	28 & 29 Vict. c. 45	19 June 1865
An Act to provide for the Collection by means of Stamps of Fees payable in the Superior Courts of Law at Westminster, and in the Offices belonging thereto. (Repealed by Supreme Court of Judicature (Officers) Act 1879 (42 & 43 Vict. c. 78))
Militia (Ballot Suspension) Act 1865 (repealed)	28 & 29 Vict. c. 46	19 June 1865
An Act to suspend the making of Lists and the Ballots for the Militia of the United Kingdom. (Repealed by Territorial Army and Militia Act 1921 (11 & 12 Geo. 5. c. 37))
Militia Pay Act 1865 (repealed)	28 & 29 Vict. c. 47	19 June 1865
An Act to defray the Charge of the Pay, Clothing, and contingent and other Expenses of the Disembodied Militia in Great Britain and Ireland; to grant Allowances in certain Cases to Subaltern Officers, Adjutants, Paymasters, Quartermasters, Surgeons, Assistant Surgeons, and Surgeons Mates of the Militia; and to authorize the Employment of the Non-commissioned Officers. (Repealed by Statute Law Revision Act 1875 (38 & 39 Vict. c. 66))
Courts of Justice Building Act 1865 (repealed)	28 & 29 Vict. c. 48	19 June 1865
An Act to supply Means towards defraying the Expenses of providing Courts of Justice and the various Offices belonging thereto; and for other Purposes. (Repealed by Statute Law (Repeals) Act 1971 (c. 52))
Courts of Justice Concentration (Site) Act 1865 (repealed)	28 & 29 Vict. c. 49	19 June 1865
An Act to enable the Commissioners of Her Majesty's Works and Public Buildings to acquire a Site for the Erection and Concentration of Courts of Justice, and of the various Offices belonging to the same. (Repealed by Administration of Justice Act 1965 (c. 2) and Statute Law (Repeals) Act 1977 (c. 18))
Dogs Regulation (Ireland) Act 1865 (repealed)	28 & 29 Vict. c. 50	19 June 1865
An Act for regulating the keeping of Dogs, and for the Protection of Sheep and other Property from Dogs, in Ireland. (Repealed by Dogs (Northern Ireland) Order 1983 (SI 1983/764 (N.I. 8)))
Dockyard Extensions Act 1865	28 & 29 Vict. c. 51	29 June 1865
An Act to enable the Admiralty to contract for certain Works in connexion with the Extension of Her Majesty's Dockyards.
Drainage and Improvement of Lands Amendment Act (Ireland) 1865 or the Drainage and Improvement of Lands Amendment (Ireland) Act 1865 (repealed)	28 & 29 Vict. c. 52	29 June 1865
An Act to amend "The Drainage and Improvement of Lands Acts {Ireland)," and to afford further Facilities for the Purposes thereof. (Repealed by Erne Drainage and Development Act (Northern Ireland) 1950 (c. 15 (N.I.)))
Drainage and Improvement of Lands Supplemental Act (No. 2. Ireland) 1865 or the Drainage and Improvement of Lands Supplemental (No. 2) (Ireland) Act 1865	28 & 29 Vict. c. 53	29 June 1865
An Act to confirm a Provisional Order under "The Drainage and Improvement of Lands (Ireland) Act, 1863," (Note: Drainage and Improvement of Lands Act (Ireland) 1863 (26 & 27 Vict. c. 88)) and the Act (Note: Drainage and Improvement of Lands (Ireland) Act 1864 (27 & 28 Vict. c. 72)) amending the same.
	In the Matter of Kilmastulla Drainage District in the County of Tipperary.	
Pheasants (Ireland) Act 1865 (repealed)	28 & 29 Vict. c. 54	29 June 1865
An Act to alter the Days between which Pheasants may not be killed in Ireland. (Repealed by Statute Law Revision Act 1875 (38 & 39 Vict. c. 66), Statute Law Revision Act 1893 (56 & 57 Vict. c. 14) and Game Law Amendment Act (Northern Ireland) 1951 (c. 4 (N.I.)))
Oxford University, Vinerian Foundation, Act 1865 or the Oxford University (Vinerian Foundation) Act 1865	28 & 29 Vict. c. 55	29 June 1865
An Act to empower the University of Oxford to make Statutes as to the Vinerian Foundation in that University.
Trespass (Scotland) Act 1865	28 & 29 Vict. c. 56	29 June 1865
An Act to provide for the better Prevention of Trespass in Scotland.
Ecclesiastical Leases Act 1865 (repealed)	28 & 29 Vict. c. 57	29 June 1865
An Act to amend certain Provisions in "The Ecclesiastical Leasing Act 1858." (Note: Ecclesiastical Leasing Act 1858 (21 & 22 Vict. c. 57)) (Repealed by Statute Law (Repeals) Measure 2018 (No. 1))
Pier and Harbour Orders Confirmation Act 1865	28 & 29 Vict. c. 58	29 June 1865
An Act for confirming, with Amendments, certain Provisional Orders made by the Board of Trade under The General Pier and Harbour Act, 1861, (Note: General Pier and Harbour Act 1861 (24 & 25 Vict. c. 45)) relating to Carrickfergus, Hastings, Maldon, Northam, and Shanklin.
	Carrickfergus Harbour Amendment Order 1865 Order for the Amendment of The Carrickfergus Harbour Order, 1862.	
	Hastings Harbour Amendment Order 1865 Order for the Amendment of The Hastings Pier and Harbour Order, 1862.	
	Maldon Harbour Order 1865 Order for the Improvement, Maintenance, and Regulation of the Harbour at Maldon in the County of Essex.	
	Northam Pier Order 1865 Order for the Construction, Maintenance, and Regulation of a Pier at Northam in the County of Devon.	
	Shanklin Pier Order 1865 Order for the Construction, Maintenance, and Regulation of a Pier at Shanklin in the Isle of Wight in the County of Southampton.	
(Sunderland) Pilotage Order Confirmation Act 1865 (repealed)	28 & 29 Vict. c. 59	29 June 1865
An Act for confirming, with Amendments, a Provisional Order made by the Board of Trade under "The Merchant Shipping Act Amendment Act, 1862," relating to the Pilotage of the Port of Sunderland. (Repealed by Pilotage Orders Confirmation (No. 2) Act 1922 (12 & 13 Geo. 5. c. xiii))
	Amended Order referred to and confirmed by the foregoing Act.	
Dogs Act 1865 (repealed)	28 & 29 Vict. c. 60	29 June 1865
An Act to render Owners of Dogs in England and Wales liable for Injuries to Cattle and Sheep. (Repealed by Dogs Act 1906 (6 Edw. 7. c. 32))
Fortifications, Royal Arsenals, etc. Act 1865 (repealed)	28 & 29 Vict. c. 61	29 June 1865
An Act for providing a further Sum towards defraying the Expenses of constructing Fortifications for the Protection of the Royal Arsenals and Dockyards and the Ports of Dover and Portland, and of creating a Central Arsenal. (Repealed by Revenue, Friendly Societies, and National Debt Act 1882 (45 & 46 Vict. c. 72))
Poor Rates (Scotland) Act 1865 (repealed)	28 & 29 Vict. c. 62	29 June 1865
An Act to provide for the Exemption of Churches and Chapels in Scotland from Poor Rates. (Repealed by Statute Law Revision Act 1875 (38 & 39 Vict. c. 66))
Colonial Laws Validity Act 1865	28 & 29 Vict. c. 63	29 June 1865
An Act to remove Doubts as to the Validity of Colonial Laws.
Colonial Marriages Act 1865	28 & 29 Vict. c. 64	29 June 1865
An Act to remove Doubts respecting the Validity of certain Marriages contracted in Her Majesty's Possessions abroad.
Defence Act 1865	28 & 29 Vict. c. 65	29 June 1865
An Act to explain "The Defence Act, 1860." (Note: Defence Act 1860 (23 & 24 Vict. c. 112))
Excise Duty on Malt Act 1865 (repealed)	28 & 29 Vict. c. 66	29 June 1865
An Act to allow the charging of the Excise Duty on Malt according to the Weight of the Grain used. (Repealed by Inland Revenue Act 1880 (43 & 44 Vict. c. 20))
Kingstown Harbour Act 1865 (repealed)	28 & 29 Vict. c. 67	29 June 1865
An Act to amend the Acts relating to the Harbour of Kingstown. (Note: Kingstown is now known as Dún Laoghaire.) (Repealed by Dublin Port and Docks Act 1869 (32 & 33 Vict. c. c))
Ecclesiastical Commissioners (Superannuation) Act 1865 (repealed)	28 & 29 Vict. c. 68	29 June 1865
An Act to enable the Ecclesiastical Commissioners for England to grant Superannuation Allowances to Persons employed in their Service. (Repealed by Statute Law (Repeals) Act 1971 (c. 52))
Parsonages Act 1865	28 & 29 Vict. c. 69	29 June 1865
An Act further to amend and render more effectual the Law for providing fit Houses for the Beneficed Clergy, and for other Purposes.
Constabulary (Ireland) Amendment Act 1865 (repealed)	28 & 29 Vict. c. 70	29 June 1865
An Act to alter the Distribution of the Constabulary Force in Ireland, and to make better Provision for the Police Force in the Borough of Belfast. (Repealed by Statute Law Revision Act 1875 (38 & 39 Vict. c. 66), Statute Law Revision Act 1893 (56 & 57 Vict. c. 14) and Statute Law Revision Act (Northern Ireland) 1954 (c. 35 (N.I.)))
National Gallery (Amendment) Act 1865 or the Dublin National Gallery Act 1865	28 & 29 Vict. c. 71	29 June 1865
An Act to amend the Acts for the Establishment of a National Gallery in Dublin.
Navy and Marines (Wills) Act 1865 (repealed)	28 & 29 Vict. c. 72	29 June 1865
An Act to make better Provision respecting Wills of Seamen and Marines of the Royal Navy and Marines. (Repealed by Navy and Marines (Wills) Act 1953 (1 & 2 Eliz. 2. c. 24))
Naval and Marine Pay and Pensions Act 1865	28 & 29 Vict. c. 73	29 June 1865
An Act for regulating the Payment of Naval and Marine Pay and Pensions.
War Department Tramway (Devon) Act 1865 (repealed)	28 & 29 Vict. c. 74	29 June 1865
An Act to enable Her Majesty's Secretary of State for the War Department to lay down and use a Tramway or temporary Railway across certain public Roads in the County of Devon. (Repealed by Statute Law (Repeals) Act 1975 (c. 10))
Sewage Utilization Act 1865 (repealed)	28 & 29 Vict. c. 75	29 June 1865
An Act for facilitating the more useful Application of Sewage in Great Britain and Ireland. (Repealed for Scotland by Public Health (Scotland) Act 1867 (30 & 31 Vict. c. 101), for England and Wales by Public Health Act 1875 (38 & 39 Vict. c. 55) and for Ireland by Public Health (Ireland) Act 1878 (41 & 42 Vict. c. 52))
Pier and Harbour Orders Confirmation Act 1865 (No. 3) or the Pier and Harbour Orders Confirmation (No. 3) Act 1865	28 & 29 Vict. c. 76	29 June 1865
An Act for confirming, with Amendments, certain Provisional Orders made by the Board of Trade under The General Pier and Harbour Act, 1861, relating to Girvan, Mevagissey, and Stomoway.
	Harbour of Girvan Improvement Order 1865 Order for the Improvement and Regulation of the Harbour of Girvan in the County of Ayr.	
	Mevagissey Harbour Order 1865 Order to enable the Trustees of the Pier and Harbour of Mevagissey in the County of Cornwall to construct new Piers and Wharves, and extend the Harbour, and for the Maintenance and Regulation of the Piers and Harbour.	
	Stomoway Harbour Order 1865 Order for the Improvement and Regulation of the Harbour of Stornoway in the Island of Lews and County of Ross.	
Public House Closing Act 1865 (repealed)	28 & 29 Vict. c. 77	29 June 1865
An Act to amend the Act of the Twenty-seventh and Twenty-eighth Victoria, Chapter Sixty-four, commonly called "The Public House Closing Act, 1864." (Note: Public House Closing Act 1864 (27 & 28 Vict. c. 64)) (Repealed by Licensing Act 1961 (9 & 10 Eliz. 2. c. 61))
Mortgage Debenture Act 1865 (repealed)	28 & 29 Vict. c. 78	29 June 1865
An Act to enable certain Companies to issue Mortgage Debentures founded on Securities upon or affecting Land, and to make Provision for the Registration of such Mortgage Debentures and Securities. (Repealed by Statute Law Revision Act 1958 (6 & 7 Eliz. 2. c. 46))
Union Chargeability Act 1865 (repealed)	28 & 29 Vict. c. 79	29 June 1865
An Act to provide for the better Distribution of the Charge for the Relief of the Poor in Unions. (Repealed by Poor Law Act 1927 (17 & 18 Geo. 5. c. 14))
Lunacy Act Amendment Act 1865 (repealed)	28 & 29 Vict. c. 80	29 June 1865
An Act to explain and amend "The Lunatic Asylum Act, 1853," (Note: Lunatic Asylums Act 1853 (16 & 17 Vict. c. 97)) and "The Lunacy Act Amendment Act, 1862," (Note: Lunacy Acts Amendment Act 1862 (25 & 26 Vict. c. 111)) with reference to Counties of Towns which have Courts of Quarter Sessions, but no Recorder. (Repealed by Lunacy Act 1890 (53 & 54 Vict. c. 5))
Marriages at St. James's Chapel, Eastbury Act 1865 (repealed)	28 & 29 Vict. c. 81	5 July 1865
An Act to render valid Marriages heretofore solemnized in the Chapel of Ease called Saint James-the-Greater Chapel, Eastbury, in the Parish of Lamborne in the County of Berks. (Repealed by Statute Law (Repeals) Act 1977 (c. 18))
Endowment and Augmentation of Small Benefices Act (Ireland) Amendment Act 1865	28 & 29 Vict. c. 82	5 July 1865
An Act to amend "The Endowment and Augmentation of Small Benefices (Ireland) Act, 1860." (Note: Endowment and Augmentation of Small Benefices Act (Ireland) 1860 (23 & 24 Vict. c. 72))
Locomotives Act 1865 or the Red Flag Act (repealed)	28 & 29 Vict. c. 83	5 July 1865
An Act for further regulating the use of Locomotives on Turnpike and other roads for Agricultural and other purposes. (Repealed for England and Wales and Scotland by Road Traffic Act 1930 (20 & 21 Geo. 5. c. 43) and for Northern Ireland by Statute Law Revision Act 1893 (56 & 57 Vict. c. 14), Public Roads (Ireland) Act 1911 (1 & 2 Geo. 5. c. 45), Motor Vehicles and Road Traffic Act (Northern Ireland) 1934 (24 & 25 Geo. 5. c. 15 (N.I.)), Statute Law Revision Act (Northern Ireland) 1954 (c. 35 (N.I.)) and Road Traffic Act (Northern Ireland) 1955 (c. 27 (N.I.)))
Prisons (Scotland) Act 1865 (repealed)	28 & 29 Vict. c. 84	5 July 1865
An Act to amend the Prisons (Scotland) Administration Act, 1860, (Note: Prisons (Scotland) Administration Act 1860 (23 & 24 Vict. c. 105)) and to explain the Fifty-second and Seventy-seventh Sections of the said Act. (Repealed by Prisons (Scotland) Act 1877 (40 & 41 Vict. c. 53))
Procurators (Scotland) Act 1865 (repealed)	28 & 29 Vict. c. 85	5 July 1865
An Act to amend the Laws relating to Procurators in Scotland. (Repealed by Law Agents (Scotland) Act 1873 (36 & 37 Vict. c. 63))
Law of Partnership Act 1865 (repealed)	28 & 29 Vict. c. 86	5 July 1865
An Act to amend the Law of Partnership. (Repealed by Partnership Act 1890 (53 & 54 Vict. c. 39))
Post Office Extension Act 1865	28 & 29 Vict. c. 87	5 July 1865
An Act to enable Her Majesty's Postmaster General to acquire a Site for the Extension of the General Post Office in St. Martin's-le-Grand in the City of London.
Record of Title Act (Ireland) 1865 or the Record of Title (Ireland) Act 1865 (repealed)	28 & 29 Vict. c. 88	5 July 1865
An Act for the recording of Titles to Land in Ireland. (Repealed by Land Registration Act (Northern Ireland) 1970 (c. 18 (N.I.)))
Greenwich Hospital Act 1865	28 & 29 Vict. c. 89	5 July 1865
An Act to provide for the better Government of Greenwich Hospital, and the more beneficial Application of the Revenues thereof.
Metropolitan Fire Brigade Act 1865	28 & 29 Vict. c. 90	5 July 1865
An Act for the Establishment of a Fire Brigade within the Metropolis.
Turnpikes, Provisional Orders Confirmation Act 1865 (repealed)	28 & 29 Vict. c. 91	5 July 1865
An Act to confirm certain Provisional Orders made under an Act of the Fifteenth Year of Her present Majesty, (Note: Turnpike Trusts (Making of Provisional Orders) Act 1851 (14 & 15 Vict. c. 38)) to facilitate Arrangements for the Relief of Turnpike Trusts. (Repealed by Statute Law (Repeals) Act 1981 (c. 19))
Parliamentary Elections (Scotland) Act 1865 (repealed)	28 & 29 Vict. c. 92	5 July 1865
An Act to shorten the Time for the Election of Members to serve in Parliament for the Ayr District of Burghs. (Repealed by Ballot Act 1872 (35 & 36 Vict. c. 33))
Comptroller of the Exchequer, etc. Act 1865 (repealed)	28 & 29 Vict. c. 93	5 July 1865
An Act to consolidate the Offices of Comptroller General of the Exchequer and Chairman of the Commissioners for auditing the Public Accounts; and for other Purposes. (Repealed by Exchequer and Audit Departments Act 1866 (29 & 30 Vict. c. 39))
Carriers Act Amendment Act 1865 (repealed)	28 & 29 Vict. c. 94	5 July 1865
An Act to amend the Carriers Act. (Note: Carriers Act 1830 (11 Geo. 4 & 1 Will. 4. c. 68)) (Repealed by Statute Law (Repeals) Act 2004 (c. 14))
Sugar Duties and Drawbacks Act 1865 or the Duties on Sugar Act 1865 (repealed)	28 & 29 Vict. c. 95	5 July 1865
An Act to amend the Law relating to the Duties on Sugar, and the Drawbacks on those Duties. (Repealed by Statute Law Revision Act 1875 (38 & 39 Vict. c. 66))
Revenue (No. 2) Act 1865 (repealed)	28 & 29 Vict. c. 96	5 July 1865
An Act to amend the Laws relating to the Inland Revenue. (Repealed by Customs and Excise Act 1952 (15 & 16 Geo. 6 & 1 Eliz. 2. c. 44))
Indemnity Act 1865 (repealed)	28 & 29 Vict. c. 97	5 July 1865
An Act to indemnify such Persons in the United Kingdom as have omitted to qualify themselves for Offices and Employments, and to extend the Time limited for those Purposes respectively. (Repealed by Promissory Oaths Act 1871 (34 & 35 Vict. c. 48))
Warehousing of British Compounded Spirits Act 1865 (repealed)	28 & 29 Vict. c. 98	5 July 1865
An Act to allow British Compounded Spirits to be warehoused upon Drawback. (Repealed by Spirits Act 1880 (43 & 44 Vict. c. 24) and Customs and Inland Revenue Act 1885 (48 & 49 Vict. c. 51))
County Courts Act 1865 or the County Courts Equity Jurisdiction Act 1865 (repealed)	28 & 29 Vict. c. 99	5 July 1865
An Act to confer on the County Courts a limited Jurisdiction in Equity. (Repealed by County Courts Act 1888 (51 & 52 Vict. c. 43))
Harbours Transfer Act 1865 or the Harbour Transfer Act 1865 (repealed)	28 & 29 Vict. c. 100	5 July 1865
An Act to transfer from the Admiralty to the Board of Trade Powers and Duties relative to certain Harbours. (Repealed by Statute Law (Repeals) Act 1986 (c. 12))
Land Debentures (Ireland) Act 1865 (repealed)	28 & 29 Vict. c. 101	5 July 1865
An Act for authorizing Transferable Debentures to be charged upon Land in Ireland. (Repealed by Landed Estates Court Act 1866 (29 & 30 Vict. c. 99), Statute Law Revision Act 1893 (56 & 57 Vict. c. 14) and Repeal of Unnecessary Laws Act (Northern Ireland) 1953 (c. 5 (N.I.)))
Smoke Nuisance (Scotland) Act 1865 (repealed)	28 & 29 Vict. c. 102	5 July 1865
An Act to amend an Act of the Twentieth and Twenty-first Years of Her Majesty, (Note: Smoke Nuisance (Scotland) Act 1857 (20 & 21 Vict. c. 73)) for the Abatement of the Nuisance arising from the Smoke of Furnaces in Scotland, and an Act of the Twenty-fourth Year of Her Majesty to amend the said Act. (Note: Smoke of Furnaces (Scotland) Act 1861 (24 & 25 Vict. c. 17)) (Repealed by Clean Air Act 1956 (4 & 5 Eliz. 2. c. 52))
Falmouth Gaol Discontinuance Act 1865 or the Falmouth Gaol Act 1865 (repealed)	28 & 29 Vict. c. 103	5 July 1865
An Act to provide for the Discontinuance of a separate Court of Quarter Sessions and a separate Gaol in the Borough of Falmouth. (Repealed by Justices of the Peace Act 1949 (12, 13 & 14 Geo. 6. c. 101))
Crown Suits, &c. Act 1865 (repealed)	28 & 29 Vict. c. 104	5 July 1865
An Act to amend the Procedure and Practice in Crown Suits in the Court of Exchequer at Westminster, and for other Purposes. (Repealed by Courts Act 1971 (c. 23))
Poor Law Board Continuance Act 1865 (repealed)	28 & 29 Vict. c. 105	5 July 1865
An Act to continue the Poor Law Board for a limited Period. (Repealed by Statute Law Revision Act 1875 (38 & 39 Vict. c. 66))
Colonial Docks Loans Act 1865 (repealed)	28 & 29 Vict. c. 106	5 July 1865
An Act to authorize Loans in aid of the Construction of Docks in British Possessions. (Repealed by Statute Law Revision Act 1958 (6 & 7 Eliz. 2. c. 46))
Annual Turnpike Acts Continuance Act 1865 (repealed)	28 & 29 Vict. c. 107	5 July 1865
An Act to continue certain Turnpike Acts in Great Britain. (Repealed by Highways Act 1959 (7 & 8 Eliz. 2. c. 25) and London Government Act 1963 (c. 33))
Local Government Supplemental Act 1865 (No. 5) or the Local Government Supplemental (No. 5) Act 1865	28 & 29 Vict. c. 108	5 July 1865
An Act to confirm certain Provisional Orders under "The Local Government Act, 1858," relating to the Districts of Nottingham, Rusholme, Plymouth, Redcar, Cardiff, Kingston-upon-Hull, Guildford, Ramsgate, Ryde, Workington, and Oxford, and for other Purposes relative to certain Districts under the said Act.
	Provisional Order putting in force the Lands Clauses Consolidation Act, 1845, within the District of the Local Board for the Borough of Nottingham, for the Purchase of Lands by the Local Board of Health for the aforesaid District for Street Improvements.	
	Provisional Order putting in force the Lands Clauses Consolidation Act, 1845, within the District of Rusholme in the County of Lancaster, for the Purchase of Lands by the Local Board of Health for the aforesaid District for Street Improvements.	
	Provisional Order putting in force the Lands Clauses Consolidation Act, 1845, within the District of Plymouth in the County of Devon, for the Purchase of Lands by the Local Board of Health for the aforesaid District for Street Improvements.	
	Provisional Order putting in force the Lands Clauses Consolidation Act, 1845, within the District of Redcar in the County of York, for the Purchase of Lands by the Local Board of Health for the aforesaid District for Street Improvements.	
	Provisional Order putting in force the Lands Clauses Consolidation Act, 1845, within the District of Cardiff in the County of Glamorgan, for the Purchase of Lands by the Local Board of Health for the aforesaid District for Street Improvements.	
	Provisional Order altering the Kingston-upon-Hull Improvement Act, 1854, (Note: Kingston-upon-Hull Improvement Act 1854 (17 & 18 Vict. c. ci)) in force within the Borough of Kingston-upon-Hull.	
	Provisional Order repealing a Local Act (Note: Guildford Improvement Act 1812 (52 Geo. 3. c. li)) in force within the District of the Guildford Local Board.	
	Provisional Order for the alteration and amendment of the Ramsgate Improvement Act, 1838, (Note: Ramsgate Improvement Act 1838 (1 & 2 Vict. c. lxx)) in force within the District of the Ramsgate Local Board.	
	Provisional Order for extending the borrowing Powers of the Ryde Commissioners acting as Local Board within the District of Ryde in the Isle of Wight.—Local Government Act, 1858.	
	Provisional Order for extending the borrowing Powers of the Workington Local Board.	
	Provisional Order repealing and altering Parts of Local Acts in force within the District of the Oxford Local Board.	
	Provisional Order for altering the Boundaries of the District of Oxford, under the Local Government Act, 1858.	
	Provisional Order for altering the Boundaries of the District of Oxford, under the Local Government Act, 1858.	
Ulster Canal Act 1865	28 & 29 Vict. c. 109	5 July 1865
An Act for transferring the Ulster Canal to the Commissioners of Public Works in Ireland.
Local Government Supplemental Act 1865 (No. 4) or the Local Government Supplemental (No. 4) Act 1865	28 & 29 Vict. c. 110	5 July 1865
An Act to confirm a certain Provisional Order under "The Local Government Act, 1858," relating to the Hastings District.
	Provisional Order putting in force the Lands Clauses Consolidation Act, 1845, within the District of the Hastings Local Board of Health, for the Purchase of Lands by the said Board for Street Improvements.	
Navy and Marines (Property of Deceased) Act 1865	28 & 29 Vict. c. 111	5 July 1865
An Act to regulate the Disposal of Money and Effects under the Control of the Admiralty, belonging to deceased Officers, Seamen, and Marines of the Royal Navy and Marines, and other Persons.
Admiralty, &c. Acts Repeal Act 1865 or the Admiralty Repeals Act 1865 (repealed)	28 & 29 Vict. c. 112	5 July 1865
An Act to repeal Enactments relating to Powers of the Commissioners of the Admiralty, and to various Matters under the Control of the Admiralty. (Repealed by Statute Law Revision Act 1950 (14 Geo. 6. c. 6))
Colonial Governors (Pensions) Act 1865 (repealed)	28 & 29 Vict. c. 113	5 July 1865
An Act to authorize the Payment of Retiring Pensions to Colonial Governors. (Repealed by Pensions (Governors of Dominions &c.) Act 1911 (1 & 2 Geo. 5. c. 24))
Pier and Harbour Orders Confirmation Act 1865 (No. 2)	28 & 29 Vict. c. 114	5 July 1865
An Act for confirming, with Amendments, certain Provisional Orders made by the Board of Trade under The General Pier and Harbour Act, 1861, relating to Eastbourne, Clevedon, Herne Bay, Llandrillo, and Pensarn.
	Eastbourne Pier Amendment Order 1865 Order for the Amendment of The Eastbourne Pier Order, 1864.	
	Clevedon Pier Order 1865 Order for the Amendment of The Clevedon Pier Order, 1864.	
	Herne Bay Pier Order 1865 Order for the Improvement, Maintenance, and Regulation of the Pier at Herne Bay in the Parish of Herne in the County of Kent.	
	Llandrillo Pier Order 1865 Order for the Construction, Maintenance, and Regulation of a Pier at Llandrillo in the County of Carnarvon.	
	Pensarn (Abergele) Pier Order 1865 Order for the Construction, Maintenance, and Regulation of a Pier at Pensarn (Abergele) in the County of Denbigh.	
Naval Discipline Act Amendment Act 1865 (repealed)	28 & 29 Vict. c. 115	5 July 1865
An Act to amend The Naval Discipline Act, 1864. (Note: Naval Discipline Act 1864 (27 & 28 Vict. c. 119)) (Repealed by Naval Discipline Act 1866 (29 & 30 Vict. c. 109))
Foreign Jurisdiction Act Amendment Act 1865 (repealed)	28 & 29 Vict. c. 116	5 July 1865
An Act to explain the Foreign Jurisdiction Act. (Note: Foreign Jurisdiction Act 1843 (6 & 7 Vict. c. 94)) (Repealed by Foreign Jurisdiction Act 1890 (53 & 54 Vict. c. 37))
Rochdale Vicarage Appointment Act 1865	28 & 29 Vict. c. 117	5 July 1865
An Act to regulate the Appointment of a Vicar or Incumbent to the Vicarage of the Parish Church of Rochdale in the County of Lancaster and in the Diocese of Manchester.
Peace Preservation (Ireland) Continuance Act 1865 (repealed)	28 & 29 Vict. c. 118	5 July 1865
An Act to continue and amend the Peace Preservation (Ireland) Act, 1856. (Note: Peace Preservation (Ireland) Act 1856 (19 & 20 Vict. c. 36)) (Repealed by Statute Law Revision Act 1893 (56 & 57 Vict. c. 14))
Expiring Laws Continuance Act 1865 (repealed)	28 & 29 Vict. c. 119	5 July 1865
An Act for continuing various expiring Acts. (Repealed by Statute Law Revision Act 1875 (38 & 39 Vict. c. 66))
Harwich Harbour Act 1865	28 & 29 Vict. c. 120	5 July 1865
An Act to amend the Acts relating to the Preservation and Improvement of Harwich Harbour.
Salmon Fishery Act 1865 (repealed)	28 & 29 Vict. c. 121	5 July 1865
An Act to amend "The Salmon Fishery Act, 1861." (Note: Salmon Fishery Act 1861 (24 & 25 Vict. c. 109)) (Repealed by Salmon and Freshwater Fisheries Act 1923 (13 & 14 Geo. 5. c. 16))
Clerical Subscription Act 1865	28 & 29 Vict. c. 122	5 July 1865
An Act to amend the Law as to the Subscriptions and Declarations to be made and Oaths to be taken by the Clergy of the Established Church of England and Ireland.
Appropriation Act 1865 (repealed)	28 & 29 Vict. c. 123	6 July 1865
An Act to apply a Sum out of the Consolidated Fund and the Surplus of Ways and Means to the Service of the Year ending Thirty-first March One thousand eight hundred and sixty-six, and to appropriate the Supplies granted in this Session of Parliament. (Repealed by Statute Law Revision Act 1875 (38 & 39 Vict. c. 66))
Admiralty Powers, &c. Act 1865 or the Admiralty Powers Act 1865 (repealed)	28 & 29 Vict. c. 124	6 July 1865
An Act for consolidating certain Enactments relating to the Admiralty. (Repealed by Statute Law (Repeals) Act 1981 (c. 19))
Dockyard Ports Regulation Act 1865	28 & 29 Vict. c. 125	6 July 1865
An Act for the Regulation of Dockyard Ports.
Prison Act 1865 or the Prisons Act 1865 (repealed)	28 & 29 Vict. c. 126	6 July 1865
An Act to consolidate and amend the Law relating to Prisons. (Repealed by Prison Act 1952 (15 & 16 Geo. 6 & 1 Eliz. 2. c. 52))
Small Penalties Act 1865 (repealed)	28 & 29 Vict. c. 127	6 July 1865
An Act to amend the Law relating to small Penalties. (Repealed by Summary Jurisdiction Act 1879 (42 & 43 Vict. c. 49))

=== Local acts ===
Short title	Citation	Royal assent
Long title
Colne Valley and Halstead Railway Act 1865	28 & 29 Vict. c. i	7 April 1865
An Act to enable the Coln Valley and Halstead Railway Company to increase their Capital.
Glasgow City and Suburban Gas Company's Act 1865 (repealed)	28 & 29 Vict. c. ii	7 April 1865
An Act to regulate the Mode of Valuation of the underground Pipes or Works in the City of Glasgow belonging to the City and Suburban Gas Company of Glasgow, for the Purpose of Assessment under "The Glasgow Police Act, 1862." (Note: Glasgow Police Act 1862 (25 & 26 Vict. c. cciv)) (Repealed by Glasgow Gas Act 1910 (10 Edw. 7 & 1 Geo. 5. c. cxxxi))
Whitechapel and Holborn Improvement Act 1865 (repealed)	28 & 29 Vict. c. iii	7 April 1865
An Act to enable the Metropolitan Board of Works to open a new Street in Whitechapel, and to remove Middle Row, Holborn, all in the County of Middlesex. (Repealed by Local Law (Greater London Council and Inner London Boroughs) Order 1965 (SI 1965/540))
Mistley, Thorpe and Walton Railway Act 1865	28 & 29 Vict. c. iv	9 May 1865
An Act to reduce the Capital and Borrowing Powers of the Mistley, Thorpe, and Walton Railway Company; and for other Purposes.
Brighton, Hove and Preston Constant Service Waterworks Amendment Act 1865 (repealed)	28 & 29 Vict. c. v	9 May 1865
An Act to confer further Powers upon the Brighton, Hove, and Preston Constant Service Waterworks Company. (Repealed by Brighton Corporation Act 1931 (21 & 22 Geo. 5. c. cix))
Rossendale Union Gas Company's Amendment Act 1865 (repealed)	28 & 29 Vict. c. vi	9 May 1865
An Act to enable the Bossendale Union Gas Company to raise additional Capital. (Repealed by County of Lancashire Act 1984 (c. xxi))
Leicester Lunatic Asylum and Improvement Act 1865 (repealed)	28 & 29 Vict. c. vii	9 May 1865
An Act to dissolve the Union subsisting between the Visitors of the Lunatic Asylum for the Counties of Leicester and Rutland and the Corporation of the Borough of Leicester, for the Admission of Lunatic Paupers from the said Borough into the said Asylum, and to empower the said Corporation to provide a separate Asylum; and to authorize the Corporation to establish a Market for the Sale of Hay and other Commodities, in lieu of the existing Market; and to extend the Powers of the said Corporation with respect to Streets in the said Borough; and for other Purposes. (Repealed by Leicestershire Act 1985 (c. xvii))
Limerick Improvement Amendment Act 1865	28 & 29 Vict. c. viii	9 May 1865
An Act for making an Embankment on the South Shore of the River Shannon near to the City of Limerick; and for other Purposes.
Oswestry Water and Sewerage Act 1865	28 & 29 Vict. c. ix	9 May 1865
An Act for authorizing the Local Board for the District of the Borough of Oswestry and the Liberties thereof to provide a better Supply of Water to the District, and to complete the Sewerage of the District, and to dispose of the Sewage for Irrigation; and for other Purposes.
Helston Turnpike Roads Act 1865	28 & 29 Vict. c. x	9 May 1865
An Act to repeal an Act for making, repairing, and improving certain Roads leading to and from Helston in the County of Cornwall, and to make other Provisions in lieu thereof; and for other Purposes.
Ramsbottom Gas Company's Amendment Act 1865	28 & 29 Vict. c. xi	9 May 1865
An Act to enable the Ramsbottom Gas Company to raise additional Capital.
Bolton Improvement Act 1865	28 & 29 Vict. c. xii	9 May 1865
An Act to authorize the Mayor, Aldermen, and Burgesses of the Borough of Bolton to construct an Aqueduct and other Works in connexion with the intended Wayoh Reservoir; and to make further Provisions for the Regulation of the Borough.
Redhill Gas Act 1865	28 & 29 Vict. c. xiii	26 May 1865
An Act for better supplying with Gas the Inhabitants of Redhill and of certain Places in the Neighbourhood thereof in the County of Surrey.
South Metropolitan Gaslight and Coke Company's Act 1865	28 & 29 Vict. c. xiv	26 May 1865
An Act to enable the South Metropolitan Gaslight and Coke Company to purchase additional Lands; to remove a Church in the Neighbourhood of their Works; and for other Purposes relating to the Company.
Folkestone Gas Act 1865	28 & 29 Vict. c. xv	26 May 1865
An Act for more effectually lighting Folkestone and its Neighbourhood with Gas.
Banbury Waterworks Act 1865	28 & 29 Vict. c. xvi	26 May 1865
An Act to incorporate the Banbury Water Company (Limited), and to make further Provision for the Supply of Water to the Town of Banbury and the Neighbourhood thereof.
Luton Water Act 1865	28 & 29 Vict. c. xvii	26 May 1865
An Act for better supplying with Water the Town of Luton in the County of Bedford.
Athenry and Ennis Junction Railway Act 1865	28 & 29 Vict. c. xviii	26 May 1865
An Act to enable the Athenry and Ennis Junction Railway Company to raise additional Capital, and for other Purposes.
Poole and Bournemouth Railway Act 1865	28 & 29 Vict. c. xix	26 May 1865
An Act to authorize the Construction of a Railway from Poole to Bournemouth.
Liverpool Improvement Act 1865 (repealed)	28 & 29 Vict. c. xx	26 May 1865
An Act to authorize the Construction of new and widening and altering of existing Streets and other Works and Improvements in the Borough of Liverpool; and for other Purposes. (Repealed by Liverpool Corporation Act 1921 (11 & 12 Geo. 5. c. lxxiv))
Lancashire and Yorkshire and Lancashire Union Railways Act 1865	28 & 29 Vict. c. xxi	26 May 1865
An Act to vest in the Lancashire and Yorkshire Railway Company and the Lancashire Union Railways Company jointly certain Portions of Railway near Blackburn.
Preston and Wyre Railway, Harbour and Dock Act 1865	28 & 29 Vict. c. xxii	26 May 1865
An Act to authorize the widening of the Blackpool Branch of the Preston and Wyre Railway; and for other Purposes.
Luddenden Valley Railway Act 1865 (repealed)	28 & 29 Vict. c. xxiii	26 May 1865
An Act to incorporate a Company for making a Railway to be called the Luddenden Valley Railway; to authorize working and other Arrangements with the Lancashire and Yorkshire Railway Company; to enable that Company to subscribe Capital; and for other Purposes. (Repealed by Statute Law (Repeals) Act 2013 (c. 2))
Fareham Gas Act 1865 (repealed)	28 & 29 Vict. c. xxiv	26 May 1865
An Act for incorporating the Fareham Gas and Coke Company; for the Increase and Regulation of their Capital; and for other Purposes. (Repealed by Gosport and District Gas Order 1924 (SR&O 1924/1442))
Bath Gas Act 1865	28 & 29 Vict. c. xxv	26 May 1865
An Act to extend the Limits within which the Bath Gaslight and Coke Company are authorized to supply Gas, and to enable the Company to construct a Railway or Tramway, to erect additional Works, to raise further Capital; and for other Purposes.
Bristol Waterworks Amendment Act 1865	28 & 29 Vict. c. xxvi	26 May 1865
An Act for granting further Powers to the Bristol Waterworks Company, and for the Amendment of their existing Act. (Note: Bristol Waterworks Act 1862 (25 & 26 Vict. c. xxx))
West Worthing Improvement Act 1865	28 & 29 Vict. c. xxvii	26 May 1865
An Act for the Improvement and Regulation of the proposed new Town of West Worthing in the Parish of Heene in the County of Sussex.
Exmouth Gas Act 1865	28 & 29 Vict. c. xxviii	26 May 1865
An Act to incorporate the Exmouth Gas, Coke, and Water Company (Limited), and to make further Provision for lighting the Town of Exmouth and certain neighbouring Places with Gas.
Shrewsbury and North Wales Railway Act 1865	28 & 29 Vict. c. xxix	26 May 1865
An Act to enable the Shrewsbury and North Wales Railway Company to raise further Sums, and to divide their Shares, and to make Deviations and Alterations in their authorized Line of Railway; and for other Purposes.
East and West India Docks Act 1865 (repealed)	28 & 29 Vict. c. xxx	26 May 1865
An Act to amend the Acts relating to the East and West India Dock Company. (Repealed by Port of London (Consolidation) Act 1920 (10 & 11 Geo. 5. c. clxxiii))
Metropolitan and St. John's Wood Railway (Extension to Hampstead) Act 1865	28 & 29 Vict. c. xxxi	26 May 1865
An Act to authorize the Metropolitan and Saint John's Wood Railway Company to extend their Railway to Hampstead; and for other Purposes.
Crystal Palace District Gas Company's Amendment Act 1865 (repealed)	28 & 29 Vict. c. xxxii	26 May 1865
An Act to enable "The Crystal Palace District Gas Company" to raise additional Capital. (Repealed by South Suburban Gas Act 1928 (18 & 19 Geo. 5. c. lxxx))
Bristol Dock Act 1865	28 & 29 Vict. c. xxxiii	26 May 1865
An Act to enable the Corporation of Bristol to improve the River Avon and the Docks of Bristol.
St. Albans Waterworks Act 1865	28 & 29 Vict. c. xxxiv	26 May 1865
An Act for better supplying with Water the Borough of Saint Alban and the Parishes and Places of Saint Albans, Saint Peter, Saint Michael, Saint Stephen, and Saundridge, all in the County of Hertford.
Tyldesley with Shakerley Local Board (Gas) Act 1865	28 & 29 Vict. c. xxxv	26 May 1865
An Act for enabling the Tyldesley with Shakerley Local Board to supply Gas in their District, and in adjoining Places; and for other Purposes.
Chesterfield Waterworks and Gaslight Company's Extension Act 1865 (repealed)	28 & 29 Vict. c. xxxvi	26 May 1865
An Act to confer further Powers upon the Chesterfield Waterworks and Gaslight Company. (Repealed by Chesterfield Corporation Act 1923 (13 & 14 Geo. 5. c. xcix))
Carmarthen and Cardigan Railway (Separation of Capital, &c.) Act 1865	28 & 29 Vict. c. xxxvii	26 May 1865
An Act to authorize the Carmarthen and Cardigan Railway Company to form into separate Capitals the Capitals authorized to be raised by the Carmarthen and Cardigan Railway Acts, 1862 (Note: Carmarthen and Cardigan Railway Act 1862 (25 & 26 Vict. c. clxxii)) and 1863; (Note: Carmarthen and Cardigan Railway Act 1863 (26 & 27 Vict. c. clxvi)) and to extend the Times granted by the said Acts for the Purchase of Lands and Execution of Works.
Winchester Water and Gas Act 1865	28 & 29 Vict. c. xxxviii	26 May 1865
An Act for the Supply of the City of Winchester and its Neighbourhood with Water and with Gas, and for incorporating into One Company The Winchester Waterworks Company (Limited) and The Winchester Gaslight and Coke Company.
Lostwithiel and Fowey Railway Act 1865	28 & 29 Vict. c. xxxix	26 May 1865
An Act for conferring further Powers on the Lostwithiel and Fowey Railway Company in relation to their Capital, and for other Purposes.
Midland Great Western Railway of Ireland Act 1865 (repealed)	28 & 29 Vict. c. xl	26 May 1865
An Act to define the Capital of the Midland Great Western Railway of Ireland Company; to enable the Company to create Preference Shares; and for other Purposes. (Repealed by Statute Law (Repeals) Act 2013 (c. 2))
Buckfastleigh, Totnes and South Devon Railway Act 1865	28 & 29 Vict. c. xli	26 May 1865
An Act for enabling the Buckfastleigh, Totnes, and South Devon Railway Company to extend their Railway to Ashburton; and for other Purposes.
Bristol and Exeter and Devon and Somerset Railways Act 1865	28 & 29 Vict. c. xlii	26 May 1865
An Act to confirm an Agreement between the Bristol and Exeter Railway Company and the Devon and Somerset Railway Company; and for other Purposes.
Great Southern and Western Railway Act 1865	28 & 29 Vict. c. xliii	26 May 1865
An Act to enable the Great Southern and Western Railway Company to create Debenture Stock.
Kington and Eardisley Railway Act 1865	28 & 29 Vict. c. xliv	26 May 1865
An Act to enable the Kington and Eardisley Railway Company to divide their Shares, and for other Purposes.
Stafford and Uttoxeter Railway Act 1865	28 & 29 Vict. c. xlv	26 May 1865
An Act to grant further Powers to the Stafford and Uttoxeter Railway Company.
Dublin Port (Tramways) Act 1865 (repealed)	28 & 29 Vict. c. xlvi	26 May 1865
An Act for enabling the Corporation for preserving and improving the Port of Dublin to lay down and maintain Tramways on the Quays and elsewhere at Dublin; for amending the Acts relating to the Corporation; and for other Purposes. (Repealed by Dublin Port and Docks Act 1869 (32 & 33 Vict. c. c))
Runcorn, Weston and Halton Waterworks Act 1865	28 & 29 Vict. c. xlvii	26 May 1865
An Act for better supplying with Water the Inhabitants of the Townships of Runcorn, Weston, and Halton, in the Parish of Runcorn in the County of Chester.
Glasgow and South Western Railway (City of Glasgow Union) Act 1865	28 & 29 Vict. c. xlviii	26 May 1865
An Act to empower the Glasgow and South-western Railway Company to contribute Funds towards and hold Shares in the Undertaking of the City of Glasgow Union Railway Company; and for other Purposes.
Rastrick Gas Act 1865 (repealed)	28 & 29 Vict. c. xlix	26 May 1865
An Act for incorporating the Rastrick Gas Company, Limited, and extending their Powers; and for other Purposes. (Repealed by West Yorkshire Act 1980 (c. xiv))
London, Brighton, and South Coast Railway (Saint Leonards Line) Act 1865	28 & 29 Vict. c. l	26 May 1865
An Act to enable the London, Brighton, and South Coast Railway Company to make new Railways from Saint Leonards to their Ouse Valley and Tunbridge Wells and Eastbourne Lines, and Deviations in those Lines; and for other Purposes.
East London Railway Act 1865	28 & 29 Vict. c. li	26 May 1865
An Act for the Construction of Railways to connect, by means of the Thames Tunnel, certain Railways on the Surrey Side of the River Thames with certain Railways on the Middlesex Side of the said River, to be called "The East London Railway;" and for other Purposes.
Birstal Gas Act 1865	28 & 29 Vict. c. lii	2 June 1865
An Act for incorporating and granting other Powers to "The Birstal Gaslight Company."
Bodmin Railway Act 1865 (repealed)	28 & 29 Vict. c. liii	2 June 1865
An Act to enable the Bodmin Railway Company to extend their Railway to the Bodmin and Wadebridge Railway; to raise further Monies; and for other Purposes. (Repealed by Statute Law (Repeals) Act 2013 (c. 2))
Littleborough Gas Act 1865	28 & 29 Vict. c. liv	2 June 1865
An Act to incorporate a Company for better supplying with Gas Littleborough in the Parish oi Rochdale in the County of Lancaster, and the Neighbourhood thereof; and for other Purposes.
Brierley Hill Gas Act 1865 (repealed)	28 & 29 Vict. c. lv	2 June 1865
An Act for better lighting with Gas the District of Brierley Hill, and certain Parishes and Places adjacent thereto, in the Counties of Stafford and Worcester. (Repealed by Dudley, Brierley Hill and District Gas Order 1931 (SR&O 1931/645))
Newport Pagnell Railway (Extension to Olney) Act 1865	28 & 29 Vict. c. lvi	2 June 1865
An Act to authorize the Newport Pagnell Railway Company to extend their Railway to Olney in the County of Bucks.
Preston Gas Act 1865	28 & 29 Vict. c. lvii	2 June 1865
An Act to re-constitute the Preston Gas Company; to authorize them to raise further Monies; and for other Purposes.
Church of St. John, Portsea, in the County of Southampton Act 1865	28 & 29 Vict. c. lviii	2 June 1865
An Act to amend an Act for building a new Chapel upon Portsmouth Common in the Parish of Portsea in the County of Southampton; and for other Purposes.
Galway Commissioners Waterworks Act Amendment Act 1865	28 & 29 Vict. c. lix	2 June 1865
An Act to amend the "Galway Commissioners Waterworks Act, 1863."
Dundee Roads and Streets Act 1865 (repealed)	28 & 29 Vict. c. lx	2 June 1865
An Act to transfer the Statute Labour Roads in the Burgh of Dundee to the Commissioners of Police of the said Burgh, and to provide for the Management and Maintenance of the said Roads. (Repealed by Dundee Police and Improvement Consolidation Act 1882 (45 & 46 Vict. c. clxxxv))
Forcett Railway Act 1865	28 & 29 Vict. c. lxi	2 June 1865
An Act to incorporate a Company for making a Railway from the Darlington and Barnard Castle Branch of the North-eastern Railway near Gainford in the County of Durham to Forcett in the North Riding of the County of York; to authorize Working and other Arrangements with the North-eastern Railway Company; and for other Purposes.
Great Eastern Railway (Ramsey Branch) Act 1865	28 & 29 Vict. c. lxii	2 June 1865
An Act to authorize the Great Eastern Railway Company to make a Railway from their Saint Ives and March Railway at Somersham to the Ramsey Railway at Ramsey in the County of Huntingdon.
Glasgow Markets and Slaughterhouses Act 1865 (repealed)	28 & 29 Vict. c. lxiii	2 June 1865
An Act for consolidating and amending the Acts relating to Markets and Slaughterhouses in Glasgow, and for other Purposes. (Repealed by Glasgow Corporation Consolidation (Water, Transport and Markets) Order Confirmation Act 1964 (c. xliii))
Gosport Gas Act 1865	28 & 29 Vict. c. lxiv	2 June 1865
An Act to incorporate the Gosport Gas and Coke Company, and to make further Provision for lighting with Gas the Town of Gosport and certain Parishes and Places in the Neighbourhood thereof; and for other Purposes.
Llanelly (Local Board) Waterworks Act 1865	28 & 29 Vict. c. lxv	2 June 1865
An Act to enable the Local Board of Health for the District of the Borough of Llanelly to construct Waterworks, and supply their District and adjoining Places with Water; and for other Purposes.
London, Brighton and South Coast Railway (Additional Powers) Act 1865	28 & 29 Vict. c. lxvi	2 June 1865
An Act to enable the London, Brighton, and South Coast Railway Company to make short Junction Railways to connect their existing and authorized Railways in the County of Surrey, and to acquire additional Lands; and for other Purposes.
Mersey Docks (Vyner's Exemption) Act 1865 (repealed)	28 & 29 Vict. c. lxvii	2 June 1865
An Act to restore the Exemption of Goods loaded or unloaded on the Lands or Docks of Robert Vyner Esquire, Part of and adjoining to the Great Float at Birkenhead, from the Payment of Dock Rates on Goods to the Mersey Docks and Harbour Board. (Repealed by Mersey Docks and Harbour Board Act 1950 (14 Geo. 6. c. xxi))
Whitehaven Junction Railway (Station Enlargement) Act 1865	28 & 29 Vict. c. lxviii	2 June 1865
An Act to enable the Whitehaven Junction Railway Company to enlarge their Station Accommodation at Whitehaven; to raise a further Sum of Money; and for other Purposes.
Glasgow Corporation Waterworks Amendment Act 1865	28 & 29 Vict. c. lxix	2 June 1865
An Act to authorize the Commissioners of the Glasgow Corporation Waterworks to construct a Bridge for carrying the Aqueduct from Loch Katrine to Glasgow over the River Endrick; to provide for the better Distribution of Water; and for other Purposes.
Sunderland Corporation Act 1865 (repealed)	28 & 29 Vict. c. lxx	2 June 1865
An Act to make better Provision respecting the Repayment of Money borrowed by the Corporation of Sunderland, and for other Purposes. (Repealed by Tyne and Wear Act 1980 (c. xliii))
Ilfracombe Railway Act 1865	28 & 29 Vict. c. lxxi	2 June 1865
An Act for authorizing the Acquisition by the London and South-western Railway Company and the Devon and Somerset Railway Company of the Undertaking and Property of the Ilfracombe Railway Company; and for other Purposes.
North London Railway Act 1865	28 & 29 Vict. c. lxxii	2 June 1865
An Act to grant various additional Powers to the North London Railway Company.
School for the Indigent Blind Act 1865 (repealed)	28 & 29 Vict. c. lxxiii	2 June 1865
An Act to enable the Corporation of "The President, Vice-Presidents, Treasurer, and Members of the School for the Indigent Blind" to sell and grant Leases of the Land belonging to them, and to purchase other Land, and for otherwise enabling them the better to carry out the Purposes of the said Corporation. (Repealed by Charities (The Royal School for the Blind) Order 1996 (SI 1996/1667))
Glasgow and South-western Railway (Kilmarnock Direct) Act 1865 or the Glasgow and South Western Railway (Kilmarnock Direct) Act 1865	28 & 29 Vict. c. lxxiv	2 June 1865
An Act to enable the Glasgow and South-western Railway Company to make new Railways between Kilmarnock and Glasgow, and for other Purposes.
Horsforth Waterworks Act 1865	28 & 29 Vict. c. lxxv	2 June 1865
An Act for better supplying the Township of Horsforth in the West Riding of the County of York with Water; and for other Purposes.
Drighlington and Gildersome Gas Act 1865 (repealed)	28 & 29 Vict. c. lxxvi	2 June 1865
An Act for incorporating and granting other Powers to "The Drighlington and Gildersome Gaslight Company." (Repealed by West Yorkshire Act 1980 (c. xiv))
Liverpool United Gaslight Company's Act 1865	28 & 29 Vict. c. lxxvii	19 June 1865
An Act to authorize the Liverpool United Gaslight Company to increase their Capital, and to purchase additional Lands; and for other Purposes.
Wexford Harbour Embankment Act 1865	28 & 29 Vict. c. lxxviii	19 June 1865
An Act to extend for a further Period the Powers of the Wexford Harbour Embankment Company for the Completion of their Undertaking; and to amend the Acts relating to the said Company; and for other Purposes.
Stourbridge Canal Act 1865	28 & 29 Vict. c. lxxix	19 June 1865
An Act to amend the Provisions of the Acts relating to the Company of Proprietors of the Stourbridge Navigation, and to confer further Powers on that Company; and for other Purposes.
Great Torrington Turnpike Roads Act 1865	28 & 29 Vict. c. lxxx	19 June 1865
An Act for more effectually maintaining and repairing several Roads adjoining or near to the Town of Great Torrington in the County of Devon; and for new Powers; and for other Purposes.
Corwen and Bala Railway Act 1865	28 & 29 Vict. c. lxxxi	19 June 1865
An Act for authorizing an Extension of the Corwen and Bala Railway; for abandoning Portions of the Corwen and Bala and Bala and Dolgelly Railways; and for other Purposes.
Weald of Kent Railway Act 1865 (repealed)	28 & 29 Vict. c. lxxxii	19 June 1865
An Act to enable the Weald of Kent Railway Company to make a Deviation of their authorized Line of Railway; and for other Purposes. (Repealed by Statute Law (Repeals) Act 2013 (c. 2))
Scottish North-eastern (Purchase of Carmyllie Railway) Act 1865 or the Scottish North Eastern (Purchase of Carmyllie Railway) Act 1865	28 & 29 Vict. c. lxxxiii	19 June 1865
An Act to vest the Carmyllie private Railway in the Scottish North-eastern Railway Company; Powers to that Company to take Tolls; raise additional Capital; and for other Purposes.
Maryport and Carlisle Railway Act 1865	28 & 29 Vict. c. lxxxiv	19 June 1865
An Act to enable the Maryport and Carlisle Railway Company to construct "The Derwent Branch Railway;" to enlarge the Bull Gill Station; to purchase additional Lands; to raise further Monies; and for other Purposes.
Port Talbot Company's Act 1865	28 & 29 Vict. c. lxxxv	19 June 1865
An Act to empower the Port Talbot Company to raise additional Capital; and for other Purposes.
Whitehaven, Cleator and Egremont Railway Act 1865	28 & 29 Vict. c. lxxxvi	19 June 1865
An Act to enable the Whitehaven, Cleator, and Egremont Railway Company to make Branches and other Works, and to extend their Railway to Bigrigg Moor in the County of Cumberland; to raise further Capital; and for other Purposes.
Hexham and Allendale Railway Act 1865	28 & 29 Vict. c. lxxxvii	19 June 1865
An Act for authorizing the Construction of Railways in the County of Northumberland, to be called "The Hexham and Allendale Railway;" and for other Purposes.
King's Lynn Docks and Railway Act 1865	28 & 29 Vict. c. lxxxviii	19 June 1865
An Act to authorize the Construction of Docks at King's Lynn, and for other Purposes relating to that Undertaking.
South-western, Kensington, and Richmond Railway Act 1865 or the South Western Railway (Kensington and Richmond) Act 1865	28 & 29 Vict. c. lxxxix	19 June 1865
An Act for authorizing "The London and South-western Railway Company" to abandon the making of Lines of Railway at Kensington and Hammersmith, and to make other Lines of Railway instead thereof, and to make the "Chiswick Curve;" and for other Purposes.
Manchester Improvement Act 1865	28 & 29 Vict. c. xc	19 June 1865
An Act for enabling the Mayor, Aldermen, and Citizens of the City of Manchester to construct new Streets, enlarge Markets, improve the Channel of the River Medlock, and to effect further Improvements in the said City; and for other Purposes.
Tees Valley Railway Act 1865	28 & 29 Vict. c. xci	19 June 1865
An Act to incorporate a Company for making a Railway from the South Durham and Lancashire Union Branch of the North-eastern Railway at Lartington to Middleton in Teesdale; Working Arrangements with the North-eastern Railway Company; Powers to that Company to subscribe; and for other Purposes.
Agra and Masterman's Bank (Limited) Act 1865	28 & 29 Vict. c. xcii	19 June 1865
An Act for enabling the Agra and Masterman's Bank (Limited) to divide the original Shares of One hundred Pounds in the Capital of the Company into Two Shares of Fifty Pounds each.
Aylesbury and Buckingham Railway Act 1865	28 & 29 Vict. c. xciii	19 June 1865
An Act to extend the Time for completing the Aylesbury and Buckingham Railway; to raise additional Capital; and for other Purposes.
Gomersal Gas Act 1865 (repealed)	28 & 29 Vict. c. xciv	19 June 1865
An Act to re-incorporate "The Gomersal Gaslight Company, Limited;" to authorize the raising of additional Capital; and for other Purposes. (Repealed by West Yorkshire Act 1980 (c. xiv))
Market Drayton Cattle Market Act 1865	28 & 29 Vict. c. xcv	19 June 1865
An Act for establishing a Cattle Market at Market Drayton in the County of Salop.
Belfast Gas Act 1865	28 & 29 Vict. c. xcvi	19 June 1865
An Act for granting further Powers to the Belfast Gaslight Company.
Bristol and Exeter Railway (Additional Powers) Act 1865	28 & 29 Vict. c. xcvii	19 June 1865
An Act to transfer to the Bristol and Exeter Railway Company the Powers of constructing and working the Cheddar Valley and Yatton Railway; to extend the Time for purchasing Lands; to authorize the Purchase of additional Lands; and for other Purposes.
Bristol Joint Station Act 1865	28 & 29 Vict. c. xcviii	19 June 1865
An Act for a Joint Station at Bristol for the Great Western, Bristol and Exeter, and Midland Railway Companies; and for other Purposes.
Carnarvon Waterworks Act 1865	28 & 29 Vict. c. xcix	19 June 1865
An Act for enabling the Local Board of the Borough of Carnarvon to supply their District with Water.
London and Blackwall Railway Lease Act 1865	28 & 29 Vict. c. c	19 June 1865
An Act to enable the London and Blackwall Railway Company to lease their Undertaking to the Great Eastern Railway Company; and for other Purposes.
Hammersmith and City Railway Act 1865	28 & 29 Vict. c. ci	19 June 1865
An Act to authorize the Hammersmith and City Railway Company to alter some of the Works connected with their Railway, and to purchase additional Lands, and to lease or transfer their Undertaking to the Great Western and Metropolitan Railway Companies; and for other Purposes.
South-Western Railway (Kingston further Extension) Act 1865 or the South Western Railway (Kingston Further Extension) Act 1865	28 & 29 Vict. c. cii	19 June 1865
An Act for authorizing the London and South-western Railway Company to make new Lines of Railway in Surrey, and for vesting in them Portions of Railways, and for authorising Agreements between them and other Railway Companies, and for the raising by them of further Monies; and for other Purposes.
South-western (Aldershot) Railway Act 1865 or the South Western Railway (Aldershot) Act 1865	28 & 29 Vict. c. ciii	19 June 1865
An Act for authorizing the London and South-western Railway Company to make and maintain a Railway from their Main Line of Railway at Pirbright by Aldershot to Farnham; and for other Purposes.
South-western (North Devon) Railway Act 1865 or the South Western Railway (North Devon) Act 1865	28 & 29 Vict. c. civ	19 June 1865
An Act for authorizing the London and South-western Railway Company to make and maintain a Railway from Bideford to Great Torrington, and for other Purposes.
Great Northern Railway (Hornsey to Hertford) Act 1865	28 & 29 Vict. c. cv	19 June 1865
An Act to authorize the Great Northern Railway Company to construct a Railway from Hornsey to their Hertford, Luton, and Dunstable Line near Hertford.
Kidderminster, Stourport and Bewdley Waterworks Act 1865	28 & 29 Vict. c. cvi	19 June 1865
An Act for better supplying with Water the Towns of Kidderminster, Stourport, and Bewdley, and certain Parishes and Places adjacent thereto, in the County of Worcester.
Ventnor Harbour (Capital) Act 1865	28 & 29 Vict. c. cvii	19 June 1865
An Act to empower the Ventnor Harbour Company to raise additional Capital.
Ross Improvement Act 1865	28 & 29 Vict. c. cviii	19 June 1865
An Act for more effectually paving, lighting, and improving the Town of Ross in the County of Hereford, for maintaining and providing Markets within such Town, and for supplying the same with Water; and other Purposes.
Rhyl District Waterworks Act 1865	28 & 29 Vict. c. cix	19 June 1865
An Act for better supplying the Town of Rhyl and Places in the surrounding District with Water; and for other Purposes.
Gainsborough Waterworks Act 1865	28 & 29 Vict. c. cx	19 June 1865
An Act for better supplying the Town of Gainsborough and the Neighbourhood thereof with Water; and for other Purposes.
North-eastern Railway Company's (Pelaw and other Branches) Act 1865 or the North Eastern Railway (Pelaw and Other Branches) Act 1865	28 & 29 Vict. c. cxi	19 June 1865
An Act to enable the North-eastern Railway Company to construct Branch Railways and other Works in the Counties of Durham and York; to acquire additional Lands; and for other Purposes.
Ayr Water Company's Act 1865	28 & 29 Vict. c. cxii	19 June 1865
An Act for supplying with Water the Burgh of Ayr and Places adjacent.
Enniskillen, Bundoran and Sligo Railway Act 1865	28 & 29 Vict. c. cxiii	19 June 1865
An Act to extend the Time for the Purchase of Lands for and Completion of the Sligo Extension of the Enniskillen, Bundoran, and Sligo Railway Company; and to enable the Company to raise further Money.
Dublin and Antrim Junction Railway Act 1865	28 & 29 Vict. c. cxiv	19 June 1865
An Act to enable the Dublin and Antrim Junction Railway Company to create Preference Shares in lieu of unissued, surrendered, and forfeited Shares; and for other Purposes.
Glossop Waterworks Act 1865	28 & 29 Vict. c. cxv	19 June 1865
An Act to authorize the Enlargement and Maintenance of existing Waterworks in the Township of Glossop in the Parish of Glossop in the County of Derby, and the Construction of new Waterworks, and to authorize the Sale of such Waterworks, and the Purchase thereof; and for other Purposes.
London, Blackwall and Millwall Extension Railway Act 1865	28 & 29 Vict. c. cxvi	19 June 1865
An Act to authorize the Construction by the London and Blackwall Railway Company of Railways in the Parishes of Stepney, Poplar, and Limehouse, to be called "The London, Blackwall, and Millwall Extension Railway;" to authorize Agreements with other Companies with reference thereto; and for other Purposes.
Metropolitan Railway Act 1865	28 & 29 Vict. c. cxvii	19 June 1865
An Act to confer further Powers upon the Metropolitan Railway Company with reference to certain Works and Lands, and to authorize the Lease or Transfer of the Undertaking of the Hammersmith and City Railway Company, and Arrangements with other Parties; and for other Purposes.
Great Eastern Railway (Additional Powers) Act 1865	28 & 29 Vict. c. cxviii	19 June 1865
An Act to authorize the Great Eastern Railway Company to make certain Railways in connexion with their Railways near the Metropolis, and to purchase Station Lands; and for other Purposes.
Hastings and St. Leonards Gas Act 1865	28 & 29 Vict. c. cxix	19 June 1865
An Act to authorize the Hastings and St Leonards Gas Company to raise a further Sum of Money; and for other Purposes.
Exeter Gas Act 1865	28 & 29 Vict. c. cxx	19 June 1865
An Act to repeal and consolidate the Acts relating to the Exeter Gaslight and Coke Company and the Exeter Commercial Gaslight and Coke Company; and to confer further Powers on the Exeter Gaslight and Coke Company; and for other Purposes.
Metropolis Sewage and Essex Reclamation Act 1865	28 & 29 Vict. c. cxxi	19 June 1865
An Act for reclaiming from the Sea certain Lands on and near the Eastern and South-eastern Coast of Essex; for making Conduits from the North London Main discharging Sewers to the Coast of Essex; for utilizing the Sewage of North London; and for other Purposes.
Brean Down Harbour Railways Act 1865 (repealed)	28 & 29 Vict. c. cxxii	19 June 1865
An Act for making a Railway to connect Brean Down Harbour with existing Railways in the County of Somerset; and for other Purposes. (Repealed by Brean Down Harbour and Railway Act 1889 (52 & 53 Vict. c. cciv))
Northern Assurance Act 1865 (repealed)	28 & 29 Vict. c. cxxiii	19 June 1865
An Act to vary, extend, and consolidate the Powers of the Northern Assurance Company; and for other Purposes relating thereto. (Repealed by Northern Assurance Act 1908 (8 Edw. 7. c. lxvi))
Witham Drainage Act 1865	28 & 29 Vict. c. cxxiv	19 June 1865
An Act for the further Improvement of the Drainage and Navigation by the River Witham in the County of Lincoln, and for amending the Acts relating thereto; and for other Purposes.
North British Railway (Lasswade Branches) Act 1865	28 & 29 Vict. c. cxxv	19 June 1865
An Act to authorize the North British Railway Company to make several Railways in the Parishes of Liberton, Lasswade, and elsewhere, in the County of Edinburgh; and to have Running Powers over the Esk Valley Railway; and for other Purposes.
City of Ripon Act 1865	28 & 29 Vict. c. cxxvi	19 June 1865
An Act to authorize the Mayor, Aldermen, and Burgesses of the City and Borough of Ripon to purchase the Gasworks of the Ripon Gaslight Company, and to supply Gas within the said City and Borough and the Neighbourhood thereof, in the West and North Ridings of the County of York; and to preclude Questions as to the Style of the City and Borough, and the Name of the Corporation; and for other Purposes.
West Sussex Junction Railway Deviation Act 1865 (repealed)	28 & 29 Vict. c. cxxvii	19 June 1865
An Act to empower the West Sussex Junction Railway Company to make a Deviation from the authorized Line of their Railway; and for other Purposes. (Repealed by Statute Law (Repeals) Act 2013 (c. 2))
Leamington Priors Gas Company's Act 1865	28 & 29 Vict. c. cxxviii	19 June 1865
An Act to repeal, and re-enact with Amendments, the Provisions of the Act relating to the Leamington Priors Gaslight and Coke Company; to extend the Limits of Supply thereby authorized; to authorize an Increase of Capital; and for other Purposes.
Assam Company's Act 1865	28 & 29 Vict. c. cxxix	19 June 1865
An Act for the Incorporation and better Regulation of the Affairs of the Assam Company.
Kilrush and Kilkee Railway Act 1865	28 & 29 Vict. c. cxxx	19 June 1865
An Act to extend the Kilrush and Kilkee Railway, and to grant further Time for Completion of the Works.
Plymouth and Dartmoor Railway Act 1865	28 & 29 Vict. c. cxxxi	19 June 1865
An Act to repeal the Acts relating to the Plymouth and Dartmoor Railway Company; to authorize the raising of additional Capital, and Arrangements with the South Devon Railway Company; and for other Purposes.
Tiverton and North Devon Railway Act 1865	28 & 29 Vict. c. cxxxii	19 June 1865
An Act for making a Railway from the Bristol and Exeter Railway at Tiverton to the Devon and Somerset Railway in the Parish of Morebath in the County of Devon, and for granting certain Powers to the Bristol and Exeter Railway Company with reference thereto.
Scottish Central and Dunblane, Doune and Callander Railways Amalgamation Act 1865	28 & 29 Vict. c. cxxxiii	29 June 1865
An Act to authorize the Amalgamation of the Dunblane, Doune, and Callander Railway Company with the Scottish Central Railway Company; and for other Purposes.
Scottish Central and Crieff Junction Railways Amalgamation Act 1865	28 & 29 Vict. c. cxxxiv	29 June 1865
An Act to authorize the Amalgamation of the Crieff Junction Railway Company with the Scottish Central Railway Company; and for other Purposes.
Caledonian Railway (Barrhead and Paisley Branch, &c.) Act 1865	28 & 29 Vict. c. cxxxv	29 June 1865
An Act for enabling the Caledonian Railway Company to make a Railway from Barrhead to Paisley, and to improve the Railway between Barrhead and Crofthead, all in the County of Renfrew; and for other Purposes.
Caledonian Railway (Shielhill Branch) Act 1865	28 & 29 Vict. c. cxxxvi	29 June 1865
An Act for enabling the Caledonian Railway Company to make a Branch Railway for connecting their Main Line near Dalmakeddar with the Dumfries, Lochmaben, and Lockerby Junction Railway near Shielhill in the County of Dumfries; and for other Purposes.
Edinburgh Merchant Company Act 1865 (repealed)	28 & 29 Vict. c. cxxxvii	29 June 1865
An Act to repeal, consolidate, and amend the Provisions of the Acts of Parliament relating to the Company of Merchants of the City of Edinburgh; and to enlarge the Powers of the said Company; to amend the Act (Note: Daniel Stewart's Hospital (Edinburgh) Act 1860 (23 & 24 Vict. c. 2 Pr.)) relating to Daniel Stewarts Hospital; and for other Purposes. (Repealed by Edinburgh Merchant Company Act 1898 (61 & 62 Vict. c. xxii))
Merthyr Tydfil Water Act 1865 or the Merthyr Tydfil Water and Town Hall, &c. Act 1865	28 & 29 Vict. c. cxxxviii	29 June 1865
An Act to extend the Limits for the Supply of Water, and to authorize the building of a Town Hall, by the Local Board of Health for the District of Merthyr Tydfil; and for other Purposes.
Crofthead and Kilmarnock Extension Railway Act 1865	28 & 29 Vict. c. cxxxix	29 June 1865
An Act for making a Railway from the Caledonian Railway at Crofthead to Kilmarnock, with a Branch to Beith, in the Counties of Renfrew and Ayr; and for other Purposes.
Halifax Extension and Improvement Act 1865 (repealed)	28 & 29 Vict. c. cxl	29 June 1865
An Act for the Extension of the Boundaries of the Municipal Borough and District of Halifax, and otherwise improving the said Borough; to amend and extend the several Powers of the Acts relating thereto; and for other Purposes. (Repealed by West Yorkshire Act 1980 (c. xiv))
Neath Water (Extension) Act 1865	28 & 29 Vict. c. cxli	29 June 1865
An Act to extend the Limits of Supply of the Neath Water Company, and to authorize them to construct additional Works; and for other Purposes.
Southampton Gas Act 1865	28 & 29 Vict. c. cxlii	29 June 1865
An Act to enable the Southampton Gaslight and Coke Company to extend their Limits for the Supply of Gas, and to raise additional Capital; and for other Purposes.
Whitehaven and Furness Junction Railway Act 1865	28 & 29 Vict. c. cxliii	29 June 1865
An Act to enable the Whitehaven and Furness Junction Railway Company to make Branches and other Works, and to extend their Railway from Millom in the County of Cumberland to join the Furness Railway in the Parish of Dalton in the County of Lancaster; to raise further Capital; and for other Purposes.
Cromford and Belper Turnpike Road Act 1865	28 & 29 Vict. c. cxliv	29 June 1865
An Act to extend the Term and amend the Provisions of the Act (Note: Road from Cromford to Belper Act 1843 (6 & 7 Vict. c. xcv)) relating to the Cromford and Belper Turnpike Road.
Manchester Corporation Waterworks Act 1865	28 & 29 Vict. c. cxlv	29 June 1865
An Act for enabling the Mayor, Aldermen, and Citizens of the City of Manchester to construct new Works in connexion with their Waterworks; and for other Purposes.
Heysham Pier Act 1865	28 & 29 Vict. c. cxlvi	29 June 1865
An Act to authorize the Construction of a Pier in Morecambe Bay.
Rickmansworth, Amersham, and Chesham Railway Amendment Act 1865 (repealed)	28 & 29 Vict. c. cxlvii	29 June 1865
An Act for extending the Powers of "The Rickmansworth, Amersham, and Chesham Railway Company." (Repealed by Statute Law (Repeals) Act 2013 (c. 2))
Ham Oyster Fishery Act 1865	28 & 29 Vict. c. cxlviii	29 June 1865
An Act for the Incorporation of the Ham Oyster Fishery Company, and for authorizing them to establish and maintain an Oyster Fishery near the North-east Coast of the Isle of Sheppey in the County of Kent; and for other Purposes.
Okehampton Railway (Extensions to Bude and Torrington) Act 1865	28 & 29 Vict. c. cxlix	29 June 1865
An Act for authorizing the Okehampton Railway Company to make and maintain Extensions of their Railway to Bude in the County of Cornwall and to Great Torrington in the County of Devon respectively, and to raise further Monies; and for other Purposes.
Great Eastern Railway (Bishop's Stortford Railway Purchase) Act 1865 (repealed)	28 & 29 Vict. c. cl	29 June 1865
An Act to authorize the vesting in the Great Eastern Railway Company of the Bishop Stortford, Dunmow, and Braintree Railway. (Repealed by Bishop's Stortford Railway Act 1868 (31 & 32 Vict. c. clxx))
Metropolitan District Railways Act Amendment Act 1865	28 & 29 Vict. c. cli	29 June 1865
An Act to confer further Powers upon "The Metropolitan District Railway Company."
North British Edinburgh Station and Market Act 1865	28 & 29 Vict. c. clii	29 June 1865
An Act to give Effect to an Agreement between the Lord Provost, Magistrates, and Council of the City of Edinburgh and the North British Railway Company with reference to the Fruit and Vegetable Market; and for the Enlargement of the North British Station at Edinburgh; and for other Purposes.
Fareham and Netley Railway Act 1865 (repealed)	28 & 29 Vict. c. cliii	29 June 1865
An Act to incorporate a Company for making "The Fareham and Netley Railway;" and for other Purposes. (Repealed by Statute Law (Repeals) Act 2013 (c. 2))
Teign Valley Railway Act 1865	28 & 29 Vict. c. cliv	29 June 1865
An Act for authorizing the Teign Valley Railway Company to raise further Monies; and for other Purposes.
Bristol Port Railway and Pier Act 1865	28 & 29 Vict. c. clv	29 June 1865
An Act for defining and consolidating the Undertaking and Mortgage Debt of "The Bristol Port Railway and Pier Company;" and for other Purposes.
Cork and Limerick Direct Railway Act 1865	28 & 29 Vict. c. clvi	29 June 1865
An Act to authorize the Cork and Limerick Direct Railway Company to issue Preference Shares in lieu of cancelled Shares, and to create Debenture Stock; and for other Purposes.
Isle of Wight Railway (Steamers) Act 1865	28 & 29 Vict. c. clvii	29 June 1865
An Act for authorizing the Isle of Wight Railway Company to provide and work Steam Vessels, and to provide Accommodation for Traffic thereby, and to raise further Monies; and for other Purposes.
Llanelly Railway and Dock (Capital) Act 1865	28 & 29 Vict. c. clviii	29 June 1865
An Act to authorize the Llanelly Railway and Dock Company to raise more Money.
Mid Wales Railway (Eastern Extension) Act 1865	28 & 29 Vict. c. clix	29 June 1865
An Act to enable the Mid-Wales Railway Company to make a Railway to join the Central Wales Railway; and for other Purposes.
West Bromwich Improvement Amendment Act 1865 (repealed)	28 & 29 Vict. c. clx	29 June 1865
An Act to amend the Provisions of the West Bromwich Improvement Act, 1854, (Note: West Bromwich Improvement Act 1854 (17 & 18 Vict. c. clxiii)) and the West Bromwich Improvement Amendment Act, 1855. (Note: West Bromwich Improvement Amendment Act 1855 (18 & 19 Vict. c. cxxxviii)) (Repealed by West Bromwich Corporation Act 1969 (c. lix))
Caledonian Railway (Balerno Branch) Act 1865	28 & 29 Vict. c. clxi	29 June 1865
An Act for enabling the Caledonian Railway Company to make a Branch Railway to Balerno in the County of Edinburgh; and for other Purposes.
Southampton Marsh and Markets Act 1865	28 & 29 Vict. c. clxii	29 June 1865
An Act for the better Management of the Marsh Estate of the Mayor, Aldermen, and Burgesses of the Borough of Southampton; and for authorizing them to establish and maintain new Markets, and to raise further Monies; and for other Purposes.
Barnstaple Turnpike Roads Act 1865	28 & 29 Vict. c. clxiii	29 June 1865
An Act to repeal an Act passed in the Fourth Year of the Reign of Her present Majesty Queen Victoria, intituled "An Act for repairing several Roads leading from the Town of Barnstaple in the County of Devon, and for making several new Lines of Road connected therewith," (Note: Barnstaple Roads Act 1841 (4 & 5 Vict. c. xxi)) and to grant more effectual Powers in lieu thereof; to convert into Turnpike Road Portions of existing Roads; and for other Purposes.
Belfast New Streets Act 1865	28 & 29 Vict. c. clxiv	29 June 1865
An Act to authorize the opening of certain new Streets in the Borough of Belfast, and to confer certain Powers upon a Company and the Mayor, Aldermen, and Burgesses of the Borough of Belfast for such Purposes.
Cheltenham Waterworks Act 1865	28 & 29 Vict. c. clxv	29 June 1865
An Act for empowering the Cheltenham Waterworks Company to extend their Works and Limits of Supply, and to raise a further Sum of Money; and for other Purposes.
Crays Gas Act 1865 (repealed)	28 & 29 Vict. c. clxvi	29 June 1865
An Act for granting certain Powers to the Crays Gaslight and Coke Company, Limited. (Repealed by South Suburban Gas Act 1928 (18 & 19 Geo. 5. c. lxxx))
Caledonian and General Terminus Railways Amalgamation Act 1865	28 & 29 Vict. c. clxvii	29 June 1865
An Act to authorize the Amalgamation of the General Terminus and Glasgow Harbour Railway Company with the Caledonian Railway Company; and for other Purposes.
Highland Railway Act 1865	28 & 29 Vict. c. clxviii	29 June 1865
An Act to authorize the Consolidation into One Undertaking of the Inverness and Perth Junction and the Inverness and Aberdeen Junction Railways, and the Union into One Company of the Two Companies to which the said Railways respectively belong; to consolidate and amend the Acts relating to the same Companies; and for other Purposes.
Sutherland Railway Act 1865	28 & 29 Vict. c. clxix	29 June 1865
An Act for making a Railway from Bonar Bridge Railway Station at Ardgay in the County of Ross to Brora in the County of Sutherland, to be called "The Sutherland Railway;" and for other Purposes.
Carmarthen and Cardigan Railway (Kidwelly Extension) Act 1865	28 & 29 Vict. c. clxx	29 June 1865
An Act to authorize the Carmarthen and Cardigan Railway Company to extend their Railway near Kidwelly in Carmarthenshire.
Winchcomb Roads Act 1865 (repealed)	28 & 29 Vict. c. clxxi	29 June 1865
An Act to continue the Winchcomb District of Turnpike Roads Trust in the County of Gloucester; and for other Purposes. (Repealed by Statute Law (Repeals) Act 2013 (c. 2))
Mold and Denbigh Junction Railway (Capital and Deviations, &c.) Act 1865	28 & 29 Vict. c. clxxii	29 June 1865
An Act to enable the Mold and Denbigh Junction Railway Company to raise further Sums, and to divide their Shares, and to make Deviations and Alterations in their authorized Line of Railway; and for other Purposes.
Bishop's Castle Railway (Further Powers) Act 1865	28 & 29 Vict. c. clxxiii	29 June 1865
An Act to authorize the Bishop's Castle Railway Company to extend their Railway to the Minsterley Branch of the Shrewsbury and Welshpool Railway in Shropshire; and for other Purposes.
Parliamentary Glasgow Road Act 1865	28 & 29 Vict. c. clxxiv	29 June 1865
An Act for transferring the New North Road or Parliamentary Road, Glasgow, to the Board of Police of Glasgow; and for other Purposes.
Carnarvonshire Railway Act 1865	28 & 29 Vict. c. clxxv	29 June 1865
An Act for extending the Time for the Purchase of Lands and the Completion of the Railway authorized by "The Carnarvonshire Railway Act, 1862." (Note: Carnarvonshire Railway Act 1862 (25 & 26 Vict. c. ccii))
Wrexham, Mold and Connah's Quay Railway (Dee Valley Branch) Act 1865	28 & 29 Vict. c. clxxvi	29 June 1865
An Act for the Extension of the Wrexham, Mold, and Connah's Quay Railway to Farndon; and for other Purposes.
Stonehouse and Nailsworth Railway Act 1865	28 & 29 Vict. c. clxxvii	29 June 1865
An Act to authorize the Stonehouse and Nailsworth Railway Company to extend their Railway from Dudbridge to the Great Western Railway at Stroud; and for other Purposes relating to the same Company.
Tottenham and Hampstead Junction Railway Act 1865	28 & 29 Vict. c. clxxviii	29 June 1865
An Act for authorizing the making by the Tottenham and Hampstead Junction Railway Company of Lines of Railway by way of Substitution for Lines of Railway already authorized to be made by them; and for authorizing Arrangements between them and the Great Eastern Railway Company and the Midland Railway Company; and for other Purposes.
Furness Railway Act 1865	28 & 29 Vict. c. clxxix	29 June 1865
An Act to enable the Furness Railway Company to construct new Lines of Railway, and to raise further Monies; and for other Purposes.
Dumfriesshire Roads Act 1865	28 & 29 Vict. c. clxxx	29 June 1865
An Act for maintaining, improving, and managing the public Roads and Bridges in the County of Dumfries.
Wolverhampton and Walsall Railway Act 1865	28 & 29 Vict. c. clxxxi	29 June 1865
An Act to authorize the Construction of a Railway from Wolverhampton to Walsall, all in the County of Stafford.
Great Northern Railway (Sleaford to Bourn) Act 1865	28 & 29 Vict. c. clxxxii	29 June 1865
An Act to authorize the Great Northern Railway Company to construct a Railway in Lincolnshire from Sleaford to Bourn.
County Antrim and Belfast Borough Act 1865	28 & 29 Vict. c. clxxxiii	29 June 1865
An Act for separating for certain Purposes the Borough of Belfast from the County of Antrim; and for making better Provision respecting Contribution by the Borough towards the Expenses of the County; and for amending the Provisions of certain of the Acts relating to the Borough; and for other Purposes.
Great Eastern Railway (Capital, &c.) Act 1865	28 & 29 Vict. c. clxxxiv	29 June 1865
An Act to authorize the Great Eastern Railway Company to raise a further Sum of Money, and to consolidate certain of their Preference Stocks, and to confer Powers upon the said Company with reference to Lowestoft Harbour; and for other Purposes.
Lugg Valley Railway Act 1865	28 & 29 Vict. c. clxxxv	29 June 1865
An Act for making a Railway from Presteign in the County of Radnor to join the Central Wales Railway in the Parish of Llangunllo, to be called "The Lugg Valley Railway;" and for other purposes.
Solway Junction Railway (Deviation) Act 1865	28 & 29 Vict. c. clxxxvi	29 June 1865
An Act to enable the Solway Junction Railway Company to make certain Deviations in their authorized Line; and for other Purposes.
Westminster Improvement and Incumbered Estate Act 1865	28 & 29 Vict. c. clxxxvii	29 June 1865
An Act to amend and enlarge the Powers and Provisions of "The Westminster Improvement and Incumbered Estate Act, 1861;" (Note: Westminster Improvement and Incumbered Estate Act 1861 (24 & 25 Vict. c. cxxvi)) for winding up the Affairs of the Commission; for the compulsory Purchase of Lands and the Completion of the Improvements; Borrowing Power; and for other Purposes.
Burnham Tidal Harbour Act 1865	28 & 29 Vict. c. clxxxviii	29 June 1865
An Act for amending and extending the "Burnham Tidal Harbour Act, 1860," (Note: Burnham Tidal Harbour Act 1860 (23 & 24 Vict. c. cxci)) and for enlarging the Powers of the Burnham Tidal Harbour Company; and for other Purposes.
Belfast Water Act 1865	28 & 29 Vict. c. clxxxix	29 June 1865
An Act for better supplying with Water the Town and Borough of Belfast and other Places, and for altering and amending the Constitution of the Corporation of the Belfast Water Commissioners; and for other Purposes.
Denbigh, Ruthin and Corwen Railway Act 1865	28 & 29 Vict. c. cxc	29 June 1865
An Act to enable the Denbigh, Ruthin, and Corwen Railway Company to raise additional Capital; and for other Purposes.
Edgware, Highgate and London (Junction) Railway Act 1865	28 & 29 Vict. c. cxci	29 June 1865
An Act to authorize the Edgware, Highgate, and London Railway Company to construct a short Line of Railway to connect their Railway with the Tottenham and Hampstead Junction Railway; and for other Purposes.
Fulham Railway Act 1865	28 & 29 Vict. c. cxcii	29 June 1865
An Act for making Railways from the Hammersmith and City Railway through Fulham to the North Shore of the River Thames; and for other Purposes.
Lancashire Union Railways Act 1865	28 & 29 Vict. c. cxciii	29 June 1865
An Act to empower the Lancashire Union Railways Company to construct an Extension Line to Saint Helens and other Branches in the County of Lancaster; and for other Purposes.
Lynn and Sutton Bridge Railway Act 1865	28 & 29 Vict. c. cxciv	29 June 1865
An Act to authorize the Lynn and Sutton Bridge Railway Company to execute certain Works at Sutton Bridge, and granting other Powers to the same Company.
Southport Improvement Act 1865 or the Second Southport Improvement Act	28 & 29 Vict. c. cxcv	29 June 1865
An Act for the Improvement of the Town of Southport and the Neighbourhood thereof; and for other Purposes.
Southwark Bridge Transfer Act 1865	28 & 29 Vict. c. cxcvi	29 June 1865
An Act authorizing the Sale or Transfer of Southwark Bridge.
Sunningdale and Cambridge Town Railway (Extensions) Act 1865 (repealed)	28 & 29 Vict. c. cxcvii	29 June 1865
An Act to authorize the Sunningdale and Cambridge Town Railway Company to make new Railways, and to use Part of the Railway of the South-eastern Railway Company; and for other Purposes. (Repealed by Statute Law (Repeals) Act 2013 (c. 2))
Belfast and County Down Railway (Holywood Branch Transfer) Act 1865	28 & 29 Vict. c. cxcviii	29 June 1865
An Act to authorize the Transfer to the Belfast, Holywood, and Bangor Railway Company of the Holywood Branch of the Belfast and County Down Railway; and for other Purposes relating to such Transfer.
Sevenoaks, Maidstone and Tunbridge Railway Act 1865 or the Sevenoaks, Maidstone and Tonbridge Railway Act 1865	28 & 29 Vict. c. cxcix	29 June 1865
An Act to extend the Time for the compulsory Purchase of Lands for Part of the Undertaking of the Sevenoaks, Maidstone, and Tunbridge Railway Company.
Edinburgh and Glasgow Railway (City Union) Act 1865	28 & 29 Vict. c. cc	29 June 1865
An Act to authorize the Edinburgh and Glasgow Railway Company to form a Station (Note: High Street (Glasgow) railway station.) on the College Lands at Glasgow, and to subscribe to and hold Shares in the City of Glasgow Union Railway Company; and for other Purposes.
Monkland Railways (Branches) Act 1865	28 & 29 Vict. c. cci	29 June 1865
An Act to authorise the Monkland Railways Company to make Branch Railways in the County of Lanark; and for other Purposes.
Caledonian Railway (Bangholm Junction) Act 1865	28 & 29 Vict. c. ccii	29 June 1865
An Act to enable the Caledonian Railway Company to make a Branch Railway for connecting their Railway with the North British Railway near Edinburgh; and for other Purposes.
Skipton and Wharfdale Railway Act 1865 (repealed)	28 & 29 Vict. c. cciii	5 July 1865
An Act to authorize the Construction of a Railway, to be called "The Skipton and Wharfdale Railway." (Repealed by Statute Law (Repeals) Act 2013 (c. 2))
Tunbridge Wells Water Act 1865	28 & 29 Vict. c. cciv	5 July 1865
An Act for a better Water Supply to Tunbridge Wells and Places near thereto; and for other Purposes.
Ogmore and Ely Railways (Amalgamation) Act 1865	28 & 29 Vict. c. ccv	5 July 1865
An Act for the Amalgamation of the Ogmore Valley Railways Company and the Ely Valley Extension Railway Company; and for other Purposes.
North British Railway (Carlisle Citadel Station Branches) Act 1865	28 & 29 Vict. c. ccvi	5 July 1865
An Act to authorize the Construction of Railways from the Port Carlisle Railway to the River Caldew, and thence to the Goods Lines on the Southern Side of the Carlisle Citadel Station; and for other Purposes.
Haddon and Bentley Road Act 1865	28 & 29 Vict. c. ccvii	5 July 1865
An Act for repairing the Road from the Guide Post below Haddon out of the Bakewell Turnpike Road into the Bentley and Ashbourne Turnpike Road, in the County of Derby; and for other Purposes.
Metropolitan Market Act 1865 (repealed)	28 & 29 Vict. c. ccviii	5 July 1865
An Act for amending the Metropolitan Market Act, 1857; (Note: Metropolitan Market Act 1857 (20 Vict. c. cxxxv)) and for other Purposes. (Repealed by City of London (Various Powers) Act 1963 (c. xxxiv))
Mansfield and Worksop Road Act 1865 (repealed)	28 & 29 Vict. c. ccix	5 July 1865
An Act for the Mansfield and Worksop Turnpike Road in the Counties of Nottingham and Derby. (Repealed by Annual Turnpike Acts Continuance Act 1876 (39 & 40 Vict. c. 39))
Midland Great Western Railway of Ireland (No. 2) Act 1865 (repealed)	28 & 29 Vict. c. ccx	5 July 1865
An Act to give Effect to an Arrangement concerning the Contribution payable under certain Enactments by certain Baronies in Roscommon and Galway and the County of the Town of Galway to the Midland Great Western Railway of Ireland Company. (Repealed by Statute Law (Repeals) Act 2013 (c. 2))
Swansea and Aberystwith Junction Railway Amendment Act 1865 or the Swansea and Aberystwyth Junction Railway Amendment Act 1865	28 & 29 Vict. c. ccxi	5 July 1865
An Act for conferring further Powers on the Swansea and Aberystwith Junction Railway Company.
Wigtownshire Roads Act 1865	28 & 29 Vict. c. ccxii	5 July 1865
An Act for maintaining the Public Roads and Bridges in the County of Wigtown.
North British and Edinburgh and Glasgow (Bridge of Forth) Railways Act 1865	28 & 29 Vict. c. ccxiii	5 July 1865
An Act to authorize the Construction of a Railway across the Firth of Forth in connexion with the Edinburgh and Glasgow and North British Railways, and in completion of the improved Railway Route between Edinburgh and Perth across the Firth; also other Railways and Works; and for other Purposes.
Blackpool Improvement Act 1865 or the Blackpool and Layton-with-Warbrick Improvement Act 1865	28 & 29 Vict. c. ccxiv	5 July 1865
An Act for the further improving of the Town of Blackpool and the rest of the Township of Layton with Warbrick in the County Palatine of Lancaster, and for other Purposes, and of which the Short Title is "Blackpool Improvement Act, 1865."
Chesterfield, Dunstone and High Moors Turnpike Act 1865	28 & 29 Vict. c. ccxv	5 July 1865
An Act for continuing the Term of the Turnpike Roads from Brimington and Chesterfield in the County of Derby to the High Moors in the Parish of Brampton in the said County; and for other Purposes.
Great Northern Railway (Junctions) Act 1865	28 & 29 Vict. c. ccxvi	5 July 1865
An Act to authorize the Great Northern Railway Company to construct certain short Lines of Railway at Newark, Spalding, Essendine, and Barkstone; and for other Purposes.
Edinburgh and Glasgow and Monkland Railways Amalgamation Act 1865	28 & 29 Vict. c. ccxvii	5 July 1865
An Act to amalgamate the Monkland Railways Company with the Edinburgh and Glasgow Railway Company.
Kidwelly and Burry Port Railway Act 1865	28 & 29 Vict. c. ccxviii	5 July 1865
An Act to authorize the Kidwelly and Llanelly Canal and Tramroad Company to stop up and discontinue the Use of their Canals, and to make a Railway from Burry Port in the Parish of Pembrey to join the Mountain Branch of the Llanelly Railway in the Parish of Llanarthney, Carmarthenshire, with Branches; to change the Name of the Company; and for other Purposes.
West Cornwall Railway Act 1865	28 & 29 Vict. c. ccxix	5 July 1865
An Act to authorize the West Cornwall Railway Company to enter into Working Arrangements with other Companies, and to lease or sell their Railway; and for other Purposes.
Belfast Central Railway Act 1865	28 & 29 Vict. c. ccxx	5 July 1865
An Act to empower the Belfast Central Railway Company to make a Line of Railway and a Tramway, and to empower the Belfast Harbour Commissioners to make a Tramway; and for other Purposes.
Dublin Trunk Connecting Railway (Deviation, &c.) Act 1865	28 & 29 Vict. c. ccxxi	5 July 1865
An Act to empower the Dublin Trunk Connecting Railway Company to make Junction and Deviation Railways; and for other Purposes.
Dublin, Wicklow and Wexford Railway Act 1865	28 & 29 Vict. c. ccxxii	5 July 1865
An Act to authorize the Construction by the Dublin, Wicklow, and Wexford Railway Company of a Railway connecting their Railway with the Dublin and Kingstown Railway; and for other Purposes.
Dingwall and Skye Railway Act 1865	28 & 29 Vict. c. ccxxiii	5 July 1865
An Act for making a Railway from Dingwall to Kyle of Lochalsh, to be called "The Dingwall and Skye Railway;" and for other Purposes.
Isle of Wight Railways (Extensions) Act 1865	28 & 29 Vict. c. ccxxiv	5 July 1865
An Act for authorizing the Isle of Wight Railway Company to make additional Railways, and to raise further Monies; and for other Purposes.
St. Clement Danes Improvement Act 1865 (repealed)	28 & 29 Vict. c. ccxxv	5 July 1865
An Act to enable the Saint Clement Danes Improvement Company to make certain Improvements in the Parish of Saint Clement Danes in the County of Middlesex; and for other Purposes. (Repealed by London Government (City of Westminster) Order in Council 1901 (SR&O 1901/278))
Stourbridge Railway Act 1865	28 & 29 Vict. c. ccxxvi	5 July 1865
An Act to authorize the Stourbridge Railway Company to construct a Branch Railway to Stourbridge, and to raise additional Sums of Money for their original Railway and Extension Railway; and for other Purposes.
Rochester Oyster Fishery Act 1865	28 & 29 Vict. c. ccxxvii	5 July 1865
An Act for the better Regulation of the Rochester Oyster Fishery; and for other Purposes.
Lymington River Act 1865	28 & 29 Vict. c. ccxxviii	5 July 1865
An Act for incorporating the Lymington River Company, and authorizing them to make Improvements of the lower Part of the Lymington River in connexion with the Lymington Docks, and to reclaim Mud Land opposite to the Docks; and for other Purposes.
Busby Railway (Kilbride Extension) Act 1865	28 & 29 Vict. c. ccxxix	5 July 1865
An Act for enabling the Busby Railway Company to extend their Railway to the Village of Kast Kilbride in the County of Lanark; and for other Purposes.
Burnley Market Act 1865 (repealed)	28 & 29 Vict. c. ccxxx	5 July 1865
An Act for the Incorporation of the Burnley Market Company; and for other Purposes. (Repealed by Burnley Borough Improvement Act 1871 (34 & 35 Vict. c. cliv))
River Fergus Navigation and Embankment Amendment Act 1865	28 & 29 Vict. c. ccxxxi	5 July 1865
An Act to revive and extend the Powers of the River Fergus Navigation and Embankment Company and for authorizing the Company to embank and reclaim from the Sea other Waste Lands on the Sides of the River Fergus in the County of Clare; and for other Purposes.
West Cork Railways Act 1865	28 & 29 Vict. c. ccxxxii	5 July 1865
An Act to enable the West Cork Railway Company to raise additional Capital; to maintain certain Portions of their Railway constructed beyond the authorized Limits; to extend the Time limited for Completion of Works; and for other Purposes.
Halesowen and Bromsgrove Branch Railways Act 1865	28 & 29 Vict. c. ccxxxiii	5 July 1865
An Act to incorporate a Company for making Railways in the County of Worcester, to be called the Halesowen and Bromsgrove Branch Railways; and for other Purposes.
Barry Railway Act 1865 (repealed)	28 & 29 Vict. c. ccxxxiv	5 July 1865
An Act to incorporate a Company for making and maintaining a Railway from the Peterston Station of the South Wales Railway to Cadoxton-juxta-Barry, with a Branch to Sully, all in the County of Glamorgan; and for other Purposes. (Repealed by Statute Law (Repeals) Act 2013 (c. 2))
Newtown Waterworks Act 1865	28 & 29 Vict. c. ccxxxv	5 July 1865
An Act for supplying with Water the Town and Neighbourhood of Newtown in the County of Montgomery.
Hoylake Railway (New Works) Act 1865	28 & 29 Vict. c. ccxxxvi	5 July 1865
An Act for the Extension of the Hoylake Railway to New Brighton; and for other Purposes.
Sidmouth Railway and Harbour Act 1865 (repealed)	28 & 29 Vict. c. ccxxxvii	5 July 1865
An Act to enable the Sidmouth Railway and Harbour Company to make and maintain a Branch from their authorized Railway in the Parish of Sidmouth; and for other Purposes. (Repealed by Statute Law (Repeals) Act 2013 (c. 2))
Spilsby and Firsby Railway Act 1865	28 & 29 Vict. c. ccxxxviii	5 July 1865
An Act for making a Railway, to be called "The Spilsby and Firsby Railway;" and for other Purposes.
Swansea Vale and Neath and Brecon Junction Railway Act 1865	28 & 29 Vict. c. ccxxxix	5 July 1865
An Act to enable the Swansea Vale and Neath and Brecon Junction Railway Company to construct a Branch to Abercrave; and for other Purposes.
Aberdeenshire Roads Act 1865	28 & 29 Vict. c. ccxl	5 July 1865
An Act for more effectually maintaining and keeping in repair the Roads, Highways, and Bridges in the County of Aberdeen; for making new Roads in the said County; and for other Purposes.
Bishop's Castle Railway (Extensions to Craven Arms, &c.) Act 1865	28 & 29 Vict. c. ccxli	5 July 1865
An Act to authorize the Bishop's Castle Railway Company to make Communications between their Railway and certain neighbouring Railways; and for other Purposes relating to their Undertaking.
Burton-upon-Trent Connexion Railways Act 1865	28 & 29 Vict. c. ccxlii	5 July 1865
An Act to abolish certain Restrictions as to the Use of the Connexion Railways of Messieurs Samuel Allsopp and Sons at Burton-upon-Trent, and to authorize them to construct additional Railways.
Burton-upon-Trent Railways Act 1865	28 & 29 Vict. c. ccxliii	5 July 1865
An Act to authorize the Construction of a Railway in the Town of Burton-upon-Trent; and for other Purposes.
Hawes and Melmerby Railway Act 1865	28 & 29 Vict. c. ccxliv	5 July 1865
An Act for incorporating a Company, and for making and maintaining the Hawes and Melmerby Railway; and for other Purposes.
Glasgow and South-western Railway (Additional Powers) Act 1865 or the Glasgow and South Western Railway (Additional Powers) Act 1865	28 & 29 Vict. c. ccxlv	5 July 1865
An Act to enable the Glasgow and South-western Railway Company to construct new Railways in connexion with their Railways and the Kirkcudbright and Bridge of Weir Railways; and for other Purposes.
Glasgow and South-western Railway (Ayrshire Lines) Act 1865 or the Glasgow and South Western Railway (Ayrshire Lines) Act 1865	28 & 29 Vict. c. ccxlvi	5 July 1865
An Act to enable the Glasgow and South-western Railway Company to make and maintain certain Railways in the County of Ayr; and for other Purposes.
City of Glasgow Union Railway Act 1865	28 & 29 Vict. c. ccxlvii	5 July 1865
An Act to enable the City of Glasgow Union Railway Company to make Deviations of their authorized Railway; to construct a Railway to the Harbour of Glasgow; and for other Purposes.
Manchester, Sheffield and Lincolnshire Railway (Purchase, &c.) Act 1865	28 & 29 Vict. c. ccxlviii	5 July 1865
An Act for amalgamating the Undertaking of the Marple New Mills and Hayfield Junction Railway Company with that of the Manchester, Sheffield, and Lincolnshire Railway Company; and for authorizing the last-mentioned Company to subscribe to the Undertaking of the Liverpool Central Station Railway Company; and for other Purposes.
Mellis and Eye Railway Act 1865	28 & 29 Vict. c. ccxlix	5 July 1865
An Act for authorizing the Construction of a Railway from the Great Eastern Railway at Mellis to Eye in the County of Suffolk; and for other Purposes.
Newcastle-upon-Tyne Improvement Act 1865	28 & 29 Vict. c. ccl	5 July 1865
An Act for the Improvement and better Government of the Borough of Newcastle-upon-Tyne; and for other Purposes.
North-eastern Railway (Leeds Extension) Act 1865 or the North Eastern Railway (Leeds Extension) Act 1865	28 & 29 Vict. c. ccli	5 July 1865
An Act to enable the North-eastern Railway Company to construct a Railway and Works in Leeds in the County of York; to raise additional Capital; and for other Purposes.
Perth General Station Act 1865	28 & 29 Vict. c. cclii	5 July 1865
An Act to incorporate the Committee for managing the General Station at Perth, and to vest in such Committee the whole of that Station and other Works to be made Part thereof; to alter the Division and Appropriation thereof; to authorize the Enlargement and Improvement of that Station and the Construction of new Works; to enable the Committee to recover the Expense of Enlargement from the Companies interested in such Station, and to confer Powers and impose Liabilities on those Companies; and for other Purposes.
Perth Station Hotel Act 1865	28 & 29 Vict. c. ccliii	5 July 1865
An Act to authorize the Joint Committee for managing the General Railway Station at Perth to lease or feu Part of the Ground within the Station Limits for an Hotel, or to erect an Hotel thereon; to enable the Companies interested in the said Station, or the Majority of them, to contribute to the Hotel; and for other Purposes.
Port-Glasgow Police Act 1865	28 & 29 Vict. c. ccliv	5 July 1865
An Act for regulating the Police, Lighting, Draining, and Improvement of the Burgh of Port-Glasgow; for supplying with Water the said Burgh and Places adjacent; and for other Purposes.
South Devon Railway Act 1865	28 & 29 Vict. c. cclv	5 July 1865
An Act to empower the South Devon Railway Company to make a Branch Railway at Exeter, and to confer upon them further Powers in relation to their own Undertaking and the Undertakings of other Companies; and for other Purposes.
South Northumberland Railway Act 1865	28 & 29 Vict. c. cclvi	5 July 1865
An Act for incorporating the South Northumberland Railway Company, and authorizing them to make and maintain the South Northumberland Railway; and for other Purposes.
Torquay Gas Act 1865	28 & 29 Vict. c. cclvii	5 July 1865
An Act to enable the Torquay Gas Company to increase their Capital and extend their Works; and for other Purposes.
Waterloo and Whitehall Railway Act 1865 (repealed)	28 & 29 Vict. c. cclviii	5 July 1865
An Act for making a Railway from near the Waterloo Station of the London and South-Western Railway to Whitehall; and for other Purposes. (Repealed by Statute Law (Repeals) Act 2013 (c. 2))
West Riding and Grimsby Railway Act 1865	28 & 29 Vict. c. cclix	5 July 1865
An Act to enable the West Riding and Grimsby Railway Company to raise further Sums of Money; to extend the Time limited in respect of One of their authorized Branches; and for other Purposes.
Wrexham and Minera Railway Act 1865	28 & 29 Vict. c. cclx	5 July 1865
An Act to enable the Wrexham and Minera Railway Company to make and maintain new Lines of Railway; and for other Purposes.
Wrexham, Mold and Connah's Quay Railway (Extension) Act 1865	28 & 29 Vict. c. cclxi	5 July 1865
An Act to enable the Wrexham, Mold, and Connah's Quay Railway Company to extend their Railway to Connah's Quay; and for other Purposes.
Hyde Park Gate Estate Act 1865	28 & 29 Vict. c. cclxii	5 July 1865
An Act to stop up Part of an existing Road called Gloucester Road, formerly called Hogmore Lane, in the Parish of Saint Mary Abbotts, Kensington, in the County of Middlesex, and to vest the Site thereof in the Owners of adjoining Lands, and to make a new Road of greater Width in lieu thereof; and for other Purposes.
Bude Canal and Launceston Junction Railway Act 1865 (repealed)	28 & 29 Vict. c. cclxiii	5 July 1865
An Act for incorporating the Bude Canal and Launceston Junction Railway Company, and authorizing them to make and maintain the Bude Canal and Launceston Junction Railway; and for other Purposes. (Repealed by Statute Law (Repeals) Act 2013 (c. 2))
Clonmel, Lismore and Dungarvan Railway Act 1865	28 & 29 Vict. c. cclxiv	5 July 1865
An Act to authorize the Construction of Railways from the Waterford and Limerick Railway at Clonmel to Lismore and Dungarvan; and for other Purposes.
Dublin, Rathmines, &c. Railway Act 1865	28 & 29 Vict. c. cclxv	5 July 1865
An Act to enable the Dublin, Bathmines, Bathgar, Boundtown, Bathfamham, and Bathcoole Railway Company to extend their Railway to Blesinton and in Dublin; and for other Purposes with relation to the same Railway.
Callander and Oban Railway Act 1865	28 & 29 Vict. c. cclxvi	5 July 1865
An Act for making a Railway from the Town of Oban in the County of Argyle to the Dunblane, Donne, and Callander Railway near Callander in the County of Perth, with a Tramway to the Harbour of Oban; and for other Purposes.
Leeds New Railway Station Act 1865	28 & 29 Vict. c. cclxvii	5 July 1865
An Act for making a new Railway Station at Leeds in the County of York; and for other Purposes.
Dover and South-western Companies Act 1865 or the Dover and South Western Railway Companies Act 1865	28 & 29 Vict. c. cclxviii	5 July 1865
An Act to provide for a Contribution by the London and South-western Railway Company to the Undertaking of the London, Chatham, and Dover Railway Company, and for the User by them of Part of that Undertaking; and for other Purposes.
London, Chatham and Dover Railway (Various Powers) Act 1865	28 & 29 Vict. c. cclxix	5 July 1865
An Act to authorize the London, Chatham, and Dover Railway Company to make connecting Railways, and to widen Parts of their existing Railways in Surrey, and to acquire additional Lands; to provide for the Abandonment of a Railway authorized by the "Crystal Palace and South London Junction Railway Act, 1862;" (Note: Crystal Palace and South London Junction Railway Act 1862 (25 & 26 Vict. c. cxliv)) and for other Purposes.
London, Worcester, and South Wales Railway Act 1865 (repealed)	28 & 29 Vict. c. cclxx	5 July 1865
An Act for making a Railway from Stratford-on-Avon to Worcester; and for other Purposes. (Repealed by Statute Law (Repeals) Act 2013 (c. 2))
Mold and Denbigh Junction Railway (Extensions) Act 1865	28 & 29 Vict. c. cclxxi	5 July 1865
An Act to enable the Mold and Denbigh Junction Railway Company to make certain new Lines of Railway, and to abandon a Portion of their authorized Railway; and for other Purposes.
Scarborough and Whitby Railway Act 1865	28 & 29 Vict. c. cclxxii	5 July 1865
An Act for making a Railway from Scarborough to Whitby.
Tooting, Merton, and Wimbledon Railway (South-western and Brighton) Act 1865 or the Tooting, Merton and Wimbledon Railway (South Western and Brighton) Act 1865	28 & 29 Vict. c. cclxxiii	5 July 1865
An Act for the Dissolution of the Tooting, Merton, and Wimbledon Railway Company, and for Testing their Undertaking, Railway, and Property in the London and South-western Railway Company and the London, Brighton, and South Coast Railway Company; and for authorizing the making and maintaining of a Junction Line of Railway at Wimbledon between the London and South-western Railway and the Tooting, Merton, and Wimbledon Railway; and for other Purposes.
Tyne Improvement Act 1865	28 & 29 Vict. c. cclxxiv	5 July 1865
An Act to enlarge the Powers of the Tyne Improvement Commissioners, and to facilitate the Construction of the Tynemouth Docks; and for other Purposes.
West Yorkshire Railway Act 1865	28 & 29 Vict. c. cclxxv	5 July 1865
An Act for enabling the West Yorkshire Railway Company to raise further Money; and for other Purposes.
Abergavenny and Monmouth Railway Act 1865	28 & 29 Vict. c. cclxxvi	5 July 1865
An Act for making a Railway from the West Midland Railway to the Coleford, Monmouth, Ush, and Pontypool Railway; and for other Purposes.
Cambrian Railways (Additional Powers) Act 1865	28 & 29 Vict. c. cclxxvii	5 July 1865
An Act to authorize the Abandonment of the Wem Branch of the Cambrian Railways Company, and a Transfer of the Company's Agreement to work the Aberystwith and Welsh Coast Railway to Thomas Savin, and a Lease of the Company's Undertaking to the said Thomas Savin.
Liverpool Gunpowder Regulation, &c. Act 1865 (repealed)	28 & 29 Vict. c. cclxxviii	5 July 1865
An Act to make further Provision for the Prevention of Accidents from Gunpowder in the River Mersey and in the Borough o( Liverpool; and for other Purposes. (Repealed by Liverpool Corporation Act 1921 (11 & 12 Geo. 5. c. lxxiv))
Aboyne and Braemar Railway Act 1865	28 & 29 Vict. c. cclxxix	5 July 1865
An Act for making a Railway from the Deeside Railway Extension at Charleston of Aboyne to the Bridge of Gairn, to be called "The Aboyne and Braemar Railway."
Bagenalstown and Wexford Railway (Sale in Bankruptcy) Act 1865	28 & 29 Vict. c. cclxxx	5 July 1865
An Act for authorizing the Sale by the Assignees in Bankruptcy of the Estate and Effects of the Bagenalstown and Wexford Railway Company of their Line of Railway and all other their Property, together with the Rights, Powers, Authorities, and Privileges of the said Company, and for the Dissolution of the said Company.
Monmouthshire Railway and Canal Act 1865	28 & 29 Vict. c. cclxxxi	5 July 1865
An Act for authorizing the Monmouthshire Railway and Canal Company to execute additional Works; to acquire the Brecon and Abergavenny Canal; to raise additional Capital; and for other Purposes relating to the same Company.
Sidmouth and Budleigh Salterton Railway Act 1865	28 & 29 Vict. c. cclxxxii	5 July 1865
An Act for authorizing the Sidmouth and Budleigh Salterton Railway Company to make and maintain a Deviation of their authorized Line in the County of Devon; and for other Purposes.
Aberystwith and Welsh Coast Railway (General) Act 1865 or the Aberystwyth and Welsh Coast Railway (General) Act 1865	28 & 29 Vict. c. cclxxxiii	5 July 1865
An Act to enable the Aberystwith and Welsh Coast Railway Company to deviate from some of its authorized Lines; to make certain Extensions at Portmadoc Harbour, Aberdovey, and Cerig-y-Penrhyn; and for other Purposes.
Brecon and Llandovery Junction Railway Act 1865	28 & 29 Vict. c. cclxxxiv	5 July 1865
An Act to empower the Brecon and Llandovery Junction Railway Company to make a Deviation of Part of their authorized Railway; and for other Purposes.
Brecon and Merthyr Railway (Various Powers) Act 1865	28 & 29 Vict. c. cclxxxv	5 July 1865
An Act for the Consolidation of the Capitals and Undertakings of the Brecon and Merthyr Tydfil Junction Railway Company; to enable them to raise more Money, and to construct new Lines to Ivor and Dowlais, and a Diversion of the Cyfarthfa Deviation; to extend the Time for the Completion of Parts of their Railways; and for other Purposes.
Bromley Gas Act 1865 (repealed)	28 & 29 Vict. c. cclxxxvi	5 July 1865
An Act for granting certain Powers to the Bromley Gas Consumers Company, Limited. (Repealed by South Suburban Gas Act 1928 (18 & 19 Geo. 5. c. lxxx))
Caledonian and Scottish Central Railways Amalgamation Act 1865	28 & 29 Vict. c. cclxxxvii	5 July 1865
An Act for the Amalgamation of the Scottish Central Railway Company with the Caledonian Railway Company; and for other Purposes.
Caledonian Railway (Additional Powers) Act 1865	28 & 29 Vict. c. cclxxxviii	5 July 1865
An Act to enable the Caledonian Railway Company to make and maintain certain Branch Railways, to supersede certain level Crossings, and to improve certain of their Stations and acquire additional Lands, in the Counties of Renfrew, Lanark, Edinburgh, Dumbarton, and Cumberland; and for other Purposes.
Caledonian Railway (Cleland and Mid Calder Railway and Branches) Act 1865	28 & 29 Vict. c. cclxxxix	5 July 1865
An Act for enabling the Caledonian Railway Company to make a Railway from their Line near Cleland in the County oi Lanark to their Line near Mid-Calder in the County of Edinburgh, with Branches to the Mineral Fields and Works in that District; and for other Purposes.
Caledonian Railway (Muirkirk Branch) Act 1865	28 & 29 Vict. c. ccxc	5 July 1865
An Act for enabling the Caledonian Railway Company to extend their Douglas Branch to Muirkirk in the Counties of Lanark and Ayr; and for other Purposes.
Cambrian and Coast Railways (Amalgamation) Act 1865	28 & 29 Vict. c. ccxci	5 July 1865
An Act to authorize the vesting of the Aberystwith and Welsh Coast Railway in the Cambrian Railways Company by Amalgamation.
Chester and West Cheshire Junction Railway Act 1865	28 & 29 Vict. c. ccxcii	5 July 1865
An Act for making and maintaining the Chester and West Cheshire Junction Railway; and for other Purposes.
Coventry and Great Western Junction Railway Act 1865 (repealed)	28 & 29 Vict. c. ccxciii	5 July 1865
An Act for making a Railway from Coventry to the Southam Railway; and for other Purposes. (Repealed by Statute Law (Repeals) Act 2013 (c. 2))
Crieff and Comrie Railway Act 1865	28 & 29 Vict. c. ccxciv	5 July 1865
An Act for making a Railway from the Town of Crieff to Comrie, with a Railway connecting said Railway with the authorized Crieff and Methven Junction Railway; and for other Purposes.
Croesor and Portmadoc Railway Act 1865	28 & 29 Vict. c. ccxcv	5 July 1865
An Act to incorporate a Company for maintaining an existing Railway from Carrey Hylldrem in the County of Merioneth to Portmadoc in the County of Carnarvon, and making an Extension thereof.
Deal and Dover Railway Act 1865 (repealed)	28 & 29 Vict. c. ccxcvi	5 July 1865
An Act to authorize the Construction of Railways to connect Deal and Walmer and Dover in the County of Kent; and for other Purposes. (Repealed by Statute Law (Repeals) Act 2013 (c. 2))
Caledonian and Dumfries, Lochmaben and Lockerby Junction Railways Amalgamation Act 1865	28 & 29 Vict. c. ccxcvii	5 July 1865
An Act to authorize the Amalgamation of the Dumfries, Lochmaben, and Lockerby Junction Railway Company with the Caledonian Railway Company; and for other Purposes.
Glasgow and South-western Railway (Amalgamations) Act 1865 or the Glasgow and South Western Railway (Amalgamations) Act 1865	28 & 29 Vict. c. ccxcviii	5 July 1865
An Act for the Amalgamation of divers Railway Companies with the Glasgow and South-western Railway Company; and for other Purposes.
Great Western Railway (Additional Powers) Act 1865	28 & 29 Vict. c. ccxcix	5 July 1865
An Act for conferring further Powers on the Great Western Railway Company for the Construction of Works and the Acquisition of Lands, and otherwise in relation to their own Undertaking and the Undertakings of other Companies and Persons; and for other Purposes.
Greenock Police and Improvement Act 1865	28 & 29 Vict. c. ccc	5 July 1865
An Act to consolidate and amend the Provisions relating to the Police of the Town of Greenock; to authorize certain Improvements in the said Town; and for various other Purposes.
Greenock and Ayrshire Railway Act 1865	28 & 29 Vict. c. ccci	5 July 1865
An Act for making Railways from Greenock to the Glasgow and South-western and Bridge of Weir Railways; and for other Purposes.
Highbridge Markets and Gas (Amendment) Act 1865	28 & 29 Vict. c. cccii	5 July 1865
An Act to amend the Highbridge Markets and Gas Act; and for other Purposes.
Ipswich and Felixstowe Railway Act 1865	28 & 29 Vict. c. ccciii	5 July 1865
An Act for making a Railway from the Westerfield Station near Ipswich of the Great Eastern Railway to Felixstow in the County of Suffolk; and for other Purposes.
South-western Railway (General) Act 1865 or the South Western Railway (General) Act 1865	28 & 29 Vict. c. ccciv	5 July 1865
An Act for authorizing the London and South-western Railway Company to make new Works; and for the Amalgamation with their Undertaking of the Undertakings of divers Railway Companies; and for authorizing Arrangements respecting divers Railways; and for regulating and increasing the Capital and Borrowing Powers of the London and South-western Railway Company; and for other Purposes.
Manchester and Milford Railway Act 1865	28 & 29 Vict. c. cccv	5 July 1865
An Act to authorize the Manchester and Milford Railway Company to make certain new Railways in substitution for Part of their authorized Railway and Aberystwith Branch; and to extend the Time for the Purchase of Lands and Completion of Part of their authorized Line; and to give various other Powers to the said Company and to other Railway Companies; and for other Purposes.
Mowddwy Railway Act 1865	28 & 29 Vict. c. cccvi	5 July 1865
An Act for making a Railway from the Cemmes Road Station (Note: Cemmes Road railway station.) on the Cambrian Railway to near the Town of Dinas Mowddwy; and for other Purposes.
Newry and Greenore Railway (Further Powers) Act 1865	28 & 29 Vict. c. cccvii	5 July 1865
An Act to enable the Newry and Greenore Railway Company to make certain Deviations in their authorized Line, and to construct certain new Works; and for other Purposes.
North British and Edinburgh and Glasgow Railways Amalgamation Act 1865	28 & 29 Vict. c. cccviii	5 July 1865
An Act to provide for a complete Union of the Undertakings of the North British and Edinburgh and Glasgow Railway Companies by Amalgamation; and for other Purposes.
North British Railway (Additional Powers) Act 1865 (repealed)	28 & 29 Vict. c. cccix	5 July 1865
An Act to authorize the Construction of a Pier at Burntisland and other Works by the North British Railway Company; and for other Purposes. (Repealed by Forth Ports Authority Order Confirmation Act 1969 (c. xxxiv))
North London, Highgate and Alexandra Park Railway Act 1865	28 & 29 Vict. c. cccx	5 July 1865
An Act for making Railways from the North London Railway to Alexandra Park, and to the Edgware, Highgate, and London Railway; and for other Purposes.
Oldham Borough Improvement Act 1865	28 & 29 Vict. c. cccxi	5 July 1865
An Act for defining and extending the Powers of the Corporation of Oldham in relation to the Improvement of Streets in the Borough, and to Police and other Matters of local Government, and to Gas and Water Supply; and for other Purposes.
Ross and Monmouth Railway Act 1865	28 & 29 Vict. c. cccxii	5 July 1865
An Act to authorize the Construction of a Railway between Ross and Monmouth; and for other Purposes.
Parish of St. Philip and Jacob Without Act 1865	28 & 29 Vict. c. cccxiii	5 July 1865
An Act for dividing the Parish of Saint Philip and Jacob in the City and County of Bristol; and for forming the Out-Parish of Saint Philip and Jacob into a distinct and separate Parish; for making further Provision as to the Election and Appointment of Overseers of the Poor for the said Out-Parish, and as to Churchwardens of the said Out-Parish; and for other Purposes.
Stapenhill Bridge Act 1865 (repealed)	28 & 29 Vict. c. cccxiv	5 July 1865
An Act for the making and maintaining of Stapenhill Bridge over the River Trent near to the Town of Burton-upon-Trent, with Approaches thereto, and for the discontinuing of Stapenhill Ferry across the River; and for other Purposes. (Repealed by Staffordshire Act 1983 (c. xviii))
Talyllyn Railway Act 1865	28 & 29 Vict. c. cccxv	5 July 1865
An Act for making a Railway from near the Aberystwith and Welsh Coast Railway in the Parish of Towyn in the County of Merioneth to the Township of Maestrefnant in the Direction of Talyllyn, to be called "The Talyllyn Railway;" and for other Purposes.
Vale of Neath Railway Act 1865	28 & 29 Vict. c. cccxvi	5 July 1865
An Act for authorizing the Vale of Neath Railway Company to raise further Monies; and for giving Effect to Agreements between them and the Aberdare Valley Railway Company and the London and North-western Railway Company respectively; and for other Purposes.
Minehead Railway Act 1865	28 & 29 Vict. c. cccxvii	5 July 1865
An Act to authorize the Construction of a Railway from Watchet to Minehead in the County of Somerset.
Wiltshire Railway Act 1865 (repealed)	28 & 29 Vict. c. cccxviii	5 July 1865
An Act for making Railways in Wiltshire from the London and South-western Railway to the Berks and Hants Railway at Pewsey and Woodborough; and for other Purposes. (Repealed by Statute Law (Repeals) Act 2013 (c. 2))
Worcester, Dean Forest, and Monmouth Railway Act 1865 (repealed)	28 & 29 Vict. c. cccxix	5 July 1865
An Act to authorize Deviations in the Line of the Gloucester Extension of the Worcester, Dean Forest, and Monmouth Railway Company; and to enable the Company to raise additional Capital; and for other Purposes. (Repealed by Statute Law (Repeals) Act 2013 (c. 2))
Acton and Brentford Railway Act 1865	28 & 29 Vict. c. cccxx	5 July 1865
An Act for authorizing the Construction of a Railway from Acton to Brentford; and for other Purposes.
West Riding and Grimsby Railway (Extension) Act 1865 (repealed)	28 & 29 Vict. c. cccxxi	5 July 1865
An Act to authorize the West Riding and Grimsby Railway Company to construct a Railway from the South Yorkshire Railway to Lincoln; and for other Purposes. (Repealed by West Riding and Grimsby Railway (Abandonment) Act 1868 (31 & 32 Vict. c. lv))
Beddgelert Railway Act 1865	28 & 29 Vict. c. cccxxii	5 July 1865
An Act for incorporating a Company for making a Railway from Portmadoc to Beddgelert in the Counties of Carnarvon and Merioneth; and for other Purposes.
Bishop's Castle Railway (Deviations) Act 1865	28 & 29 Vict. c. cccxxiii	5 July 1865
An Act to enable the Bishop's Castle Railway Company to make Deviations in their authorized Railway, and a new Line in connexion therewith; to alter the Levels of their authorized Railway; and for other Purposes.
Brecon and Merthyr Railway (Amalgamation) Act 1865	28 & 29 Vict. c. cccxxiv	5 July 1865
An Act for enabling the Brecon and Merthyr Tydfil Junction Railway Company to acquire the Hereford, Hay, and Brecon Railway; and for other Purposes.
Bute Docks Act 1865	28 & 29 Vict. c. cccxxv	5 July 1865
An Act for the better Regulation and Management of the Docks and other Works at and near to Cardiff of the Trustees and others claiming under the Will of the late Marquess of Bute; for authorizing Arrangements with Railway and other Companies; and for other Purposes.
Carnarvon and Llanberis Railway Extension Act 1865	28 & 29 Vict. c. cccxxvi	5 July 1865
An Act to confer further Powers upon the Carnarvon and Llanberis Railway Company; and for other Purposes.
Cheshire Lines Transfer Act 1865	28 & 29 Vict. c. cccxxvii	5 July 1865
An Act to vest in the Great Northern, the Manchester, Sheffield, and Lincolnshire, and the Midland Railway Companies, jointly, the Stockport and Woodley Junction, the Stockport, Timperley, and Altrincham Junction, the Cheshire Midland, the West Cheshire, and the Garston and Liverpool Railways; and for other Purposes with respect to the said Undertakings.
Edinburgh and Glasgow Railway (Coatbridge Branch) Act 1865	28 & 29 Vict. c. cccxxviii	5 July 1865
An Act to authorize the Edinburgh and Glasgow Railway Company to make a Railway from Glasgow to Coatbridge, and a Junction with the City of Glasgow Union Railway; and for other Purposes.
Furness and Lancaster and Carlisle Union Railway Act 1865	28 & 29 Vict. c. cccxxix	5 July 1865
An Act for incorporating a Company for making a Railway, to be called "The Furness and Lancaster and Carlisle Union Railway;" and for other Purposes.
Great Northern, and Leeds, Bradford and Halifax Junction Railways Amalgamation Act 1865	28 & 29 Vict. c. cccxxx	5 July 1865
An Act for the Amalgamation of the Leeds, Bradford, and Halifax Junction Railway Company with the Great Northern Railway Company.
Great Northern and West Yorkshire Railways Amalgamation Act 1865	28 & 29 Vict. c. cccxxxi	5 July 1865
An Act for the Amalgamation of the West Yorkshire Railway Company with the Great Northern Railway Company.
Lancashire and Yorkshire Railway (Ripponden and Stainland Branches, &c.) Act 1865	28 & 29 Vict. c. cccxxxii	5 July 1865
An Act for conferring Powers on the Lancashire and Yorkshire Railway Company for the Construction of Branch Railways and Works and the Acquisition of Lands; and for other Purposes.
London and North Western Railway (Additional Powers, England) Act 1865	28 & 29 Vict. c. cccxxxiii	5 July 1865
An Act for conferring additional Powers on the London and North-western Railway Company in relation to their own Undertaking and the Undertakings of other Companies in England; and for other Purposes.
London and North Western Railway (Additional Powers, Wales) Act 1865	28 & 29 Vict. c. cccxxxiv	5 July 1865
An Act for conferring additional Powers on the London and North-western Railway Company in relation to their own Undertaking and the Undertakings of other Companies in Wales; and for other Purposes.
Midland Railway (New Lines and Additional Powers) Act 1865	28 & 29 Vict. c. cccxxxv	5 July 1865
An Act for conferring additional Powers on the Midland Railway Company for the Construction of Works, and otherwise in relation to their own Undertaking and the Undertakings of other Companies; and for other Purposes.
Moses Gate and Ringley Road Act 1865	28 & 29 Vict. c. cccxxxvi	5 July 1865
An Act to repeal the Act relating to the Moses Gate and Ringley Branch Turnpike Roads, and to make other Provisions in lieu thereof; and to authorize new Works; and for other Purposes.
Nantlle Railway Act 1865	28 & 29 Vict. c. cccxxxvii	5 July 1865
An Act to authorize the Widening and Extension of the Nantlle Railway; and for other Purposes.
North and South Wiltshire Junction Railway Act 1865 (repealed)	28 & 29 Vict. c. cccxxxviii	5 July 1865
An Act for making a Railway from Christian Malford in the County of Wilts to Beachingstoke in the same County. (Repealed by Statute Law (Repeals) Act 2013 (c. 2))
North Staffordshire Railway (Potteries Loop Line) Act 1865	28 & 29 Vict. c. cccxxxix	5 July 1865
An Act to authorize the North Staffordshire Railway Company to construct certain Railways forming a Loop Line of Railway in the Staffordshire Potteries; and for other Purposes.
Peterborough, Wisbeach, and Sutton Railway Act 1865	28 & 29 Vict. c. cccxl	5 July 1865
An Act for authorizing the Peterborough, Wisbeach, and Sutton Railway Company to extend their Railway to Crowland; and for other Purposes.
Shrewsbury and Potteries Junction Railway Act 1865	28 & 29 Vict. c. cccxli	5 July 1865
An Act to authorize the Construction of Railways in the County of Salop, to be called "The Shrewsbury and Potteries Junction Railway;" and for other Purposes.
Sirhowy Railway Act 1865	28 & 29 Vict. c. cccxlii	5 July 1865
An Act for authorizing the Sirhowy Railway Company to construct a Railway in substitution for the authorized Extension of their Railway to the Merthyr, Tredegar, and Abergavenny Railway, and to deviate their authorized Railway in the Parish of Bedwellty, and to use Parts of the Merthyr, Tredegar, and Abergavenny Railway; and for confirming the Mode in which certain Roads have been crossed or diverted by the Company; and for suspending the Operation of certain Provisions of "The Sirhowy Railway Act, 1860," (Note: Sirhowy Railway Act 1860 (23 & 24 Vict. c. lxxi)) as to Passenger Trains to be run upon the Railways of the Company and the Monmouthshire Railway; and for other Purposes.
South Eastern Railway Act 1865	28 & 29 Vict. c. cccxliii	5 July 1865
An Act for authorizing "The South-eastern Railway Company" to make new Lines of Railway by way of Extensions of their Railway at Greenwich, Woolwich, and Cranbrook respectively; to acquire additional Lands; to raise further Monies; and for other Purposes.
South Essex Railway Act 1865 (repealed)	28 & 29 Vict. c. cccxliv	5 July 1865
An Act to authorize the Construction of a Railway in Essex, to be called the "South Essex Railway." (Repealed by Statute Law (Repeals) Act 2013 (c. 2))
Strathspey Railway (Extension) Act 1865	28 & 29 Vict. c. cccxlv	5 July 1865
An Act to authorize the Strathspey Railway Company to extend their Railway; and for other Purposes.
Ryde Pier Tramways Act 1865	28 & 29 Vict. c. cccxlvi	5 July 1865
An Act to authorize the Ryde Pier Company to construct certain Tramways at Ryde in the Isle of Wight; and for other Purposes.
London, Chatham and Dover Railway (Kent Lines) Act 1865	28 & 29 Vict. c. cccxlvii	5 July 1865
An Act to authorize the London, Chatham, and Dover Railway Company to make a short connecting Railway at Beckenham, and to abandon certain authorized Lines; to make Provisions as to the working of their Traffic and that of the South-eastern Railway Company; to confer further Powers with reference to the Kent Coast Railway, and Exemptions from Dues and Privileges at Broadstairs, Ramsgate, and Margate; and for other Purposes.
Bury St. Edmunds and Thetford Railway Act 1865	28 & 29 Vict. c. cccxlviii	5 July 1865
An Act for authorizing the Construction of Railways from Bury St. Edmunds in the County of Suffolk to Thetford in the County of Norfolk; and for other Purposes.
Llanelly Railway (Extension to Mumbles) Act 1865	28 & 29 Vict. c. cccxlix	5 July 1865
An Act to authorize the Llanelly Railway and Dock Company to extend their Railway to the Mumbles.
Navan and Kingscourt Railway Act 1865	28 & 29 Vict. c. cccl	5 July 1865
An Act for making a Railway from Navan in the County of Meath to Kingscourt in the County of Cavan.
Waterford, Lismore and Fermoy Railway Act 1865 (repealed)	28 & 29 Vict. c. cccli	5 July 1865
An Act to authorize the Construction of Railways from Waterford to Dungarvan in the County of Waterford, and from Lismore in the County of Waterford to Fermoy in the County of Cork; and for other Purposes. (Repealed by Statute Law (Repeals) Act 2013 (c. 2))
Carmarthenshire Railway Amendment Act 1865	28 & 29 Vict. c. ccclii	5 July 1865
An Act to confer further Powers upon the Carmarthenshire Railway Company; and for other Purposes.
Southern Railway Act 1865 (repealed)	28 & 29 Vict. c. cccliii	5 July 1865
An Act for making a Railway from the Great Southern and Western Railway at Thurles to Clonmel. (Repealed by Statute Law (Repeals) Act 2013 (c. 2))
Chichester and Midhurst Railway (Extension) Act 1865	28 & 29 Vict. c. cccliv	5 July 1865
An Act to enable the Chichester and Midhurst Railway Company to extend their Railway to the London and South-western Railway near Haslemere; and for other Purposes.
Bedford and Northampton Railway Act 1865	28 & 29 Vict. c. ccclv	5 July 1865
An Act for making and maintaining "The Bedford and Northampton Railway;" and for other Purposes.
Blane Valley Railway Extension Act 1865	28 & 29 Vict. c. ccclvi	5 July 1865
An Act for making an Extension of the Blane Valley Railway in the County of Stirling, and a Diversion of Part of the said Railway; and for other Purposes.
Drayton Junction Railway (Extensions) Act 1865	28 & 29 Vict. c. ccclvii	5 July 1865
An Act for the Extension of the Drayton Junction Railway to Bettisfield; and for other Purposes.
Girvan and Portpatrick Junction Railway Act 1865	28 & 29 Vict. c. ccclviii	5 July 1865
An Act for making a Railway from Girvan in the County of Ayr to East Challoch in the County of Wigtown; and for other Purposes.
Midland Railway (Mansfield, &c. Lines) Act 1865	28 & 29 Vict. c. ccclix	5 July 1865
An Act for enabling the Midland Railway Company to construct Railways from Mansfield to Southwell, and from Mansfield to Worksop, with a Branch to Staveley, and other Branches; and for other Purposes.
Newport and Usk Railway Act 1865	28 & 29 Vict. c. ccclx	5 July 1865
An Act to authorize the Construction of a Railway in the County of Monmouth, to be called the "Newport and Usk Railway;" and for other Purposes.
Northampton and Banbury Railway (Branch) Act 1865	28 & 29 Vict. c. ccclxi	5 July 1865
An Act to enable the Northampton and Banbury Junction Railway Company to make a Branch at Blisworth; to raise additional Capital; and for other Purposes.
Northampton and Banbury Railway (Extensions) Act 1865	28 & 29 Vict. c. ccclxii	5 July 1865
An Act to enable the Northampton and Banbury Junction Railway Company to extend their Railway to Chipping Norton and Blockey; and for other Purposes.
North Eastern and Cleveland Railways Act 1865	28 & 29 Vict. c. ccclxiii	5 July 1865
An Act to enable the North-Eastern Railway Company to construct Branch Railways in the North Riding of Yorkshire, and abandon Portions of Railway; and for other Purposes.
Pontypool, Caerleon and Newport Railway Act 1865	28 & 29 Vict. c. ccclxiv	5 July 1865
An Act for making Railways from the Newport, Abergavenny, and Hereford Line of the Great Western Railway Company at Pontypool to Caerleon, and to the Great Western Railway at or near Newport; and for other Purposes.
Regent's Canal (Limehouse Basin) Act 1865	28 & 29 Vict. c. ccclxv	5 July 1865
An Act for authorizing the Company of Proprietors of the Regent's Canal to improve their Limehouse Basin, and make a new Entrance thereto from the River Thames, and a Wharf on the Thames, and other Works, at Limehouse; for regulating their Capital, and authorizing them to raise further Monies; and for other Purposes.
Severn Junction Railway Act 1865	28 & 29 Vict. c. ccclxvi	5 July 1865
An Act for making Railways in Gloucestershire to connect certain Railways on the East with Railways on the West of the River Severn; and for other Purposes.
South Wales and Great Western Direct Railway Act 1865	28 & 29 Vict. c. ccclxvii	5 July 1865
An Act for incorporating a Company for making a Railway, to be called "The South Wales and Great Western Direct Railway;" and for other Purposes.
North Eastern, West Hartlepool and Cleveland Railways Amalgamation Act 1865	28 & 29 Vict. c. ccclxviii	5 July 1865
An Act for the Amalgamation of the Undertakings of the West Hartlepool Harbour and Railway Company and the Cleveland Railway Company with that of the North-eastern Railway Company; and for other Purposes.
Limerick and North Kerry Junction Railway Act 1865 (repealed)	28 & 29 Vict. c. ccclxix	5 July 1865
An Act to incorporate a Company for making the Limerick and North Kerry Junction Railway; and for other Purposes. (Repealed by Statute Law (Repeals) Act 2013 (c. 2))
Bodmin and Wadebridge Railway Act 1865	28 & 29 Vict. c. ccclxx	5 July 1865
An Act for authorizing the Bodmin and Wadebridge Railway Company to improve the Line of their Railway, and to abandon Portions thereof, and to raise further Monies; and for authorizing Arrangements between them and other Railway Companies; and for other Purposes.
Mid Wales Railway (Western Extensions) Act 1865	28 & 29 Vict. c. ccclxxi	5 July 1865
An Act to enable the Mid-Wales Railway Company to make Extensions to the Westward, and to abandon the Formation of the Llangurig Branch authorized to be made by "The Mid-Wales Railway (Llangurig Branch, &c.) Act, 1863;" (Note: Mid Wales Railway (Llangurig Branch, &c.) Act 1863 (26 & 27 Vict. c. lxxx)) and for other Purposes.
West London Wharves and Warehouses Act 1865	28 & 29 Vict. c. ccclxxii	5 July 1865
An Act for authorizing the West London Docks and Warehouses Company to extend their Limits of Deviation; to divert or stop up Roads; to alter and vary their Rates and Duties and Rates of Interest; to change their Name; to raise further Monies; and for other Purposes.
Saltash and Callington Railway Act 1865 (repealed)	28 & 29 Vict. c. ccclxxiii	6 July 1865
An Act for making a Railway from the Cornwall Railway near Saltash to the Tamar Kit Hill and Callington Railway at Callington in the County of Cornwall. (Repealed by Statute Law (Repeals) Act 2013 (c. 2))
Central Cornwall Railway Act 1865 (repealed)	28 & 29 Vict. c. ccclxxiv	6 July 1865
An Act for authorizing the Launceston, Bodmin, and Wadebridge Junction Railway Company to make an Extension Railway from the Bodmin and Wadebridge Junction Railway at Ruthern Bridge to the Cornwall Railway at Truro, and to raise further Monies; and for changing the Name of the Company; and for other Purposes. (Repealed by Statute Law (Repeals) Act 2013 (c. 2))
North Kent Railway Extension Railway Act 1865 (repealed)	28 & 29 Vict. c. ccclxxv	6 July 1865
An Act to authorize the Construction of a Railway from the North Kent Railway to the Medway, and of a Pier in that River; and for other Purposes. (Repealed by Statute Law (Repeals) Act 2013 (c. 2))
Afon Valley Railway Act 1865 (repealed)	28 & 29 Vict. c. ccclxxvi	6 July 1865
An Act to authorize the Construction of a Railway in the County of Glamorgan, to be called "The Afon Valley Railway;" and for other Purposes. (Repealed by Statute Law (Repeals) Act 2013 (c. 2))
Alexandra (Newport) Dock Act 1865	28 & 29 Vict. c. ccclxxvii	6 July 1865
An Act to authorize the Construction of a Dock and other Works at or near Newport on the Western Side of the River Ush, to be called "The Alexandra Dock," and of Railways to connect the same with neighbouring Railways; and for other Purposes.
Manchester, Sheffield and Lincolnshire Railway (Extension to Liverpool) Act 1865	28 & 29 Vict. c. ccclxxviii	6 July 1865
An Act for authorizing the Manchester, Sheffield, and Lincolnshire Railway Company to make a Railway to Liverpool; and for other Purposes.
Surrey and Sussex Junction Railway Act 1865	28 & 29 Vict. c. ccclxxix	6 July 1865
An Act for making certain Railways from the London, Brighton, and South Coast Railway to the East Grinstead, Groombridge, and Tunbridge Wells Railway, and to the Brighton, Uckfield, and Tunbridge Wells Railway; and for other Purposes.
Fishguard Railway and Harbour Act 1865	28 & 29 Vict. c. ccclxxx	6 July 1865
An Act to authorize the Construction of a Railway from the South Wales Railway to Fishguard Bay, and of a Harbour there; and for other Purposes.
Waterford and Passage Railway Act 1865	28 & 29 Vict. c. ccclxxxi	6 July 1865
An Act to extend the Time limited for the Purchase of Lands and Completion of Works by the Acts relating to the Waterford and Passage Railway Company.
Dublin Metropolitan Junction Railways Act 1865	28 & 29 Vict. c. ccclxxxii	6 July 1865
An Act to authorize the Construction of Railways in and near Dublin, to be called "The Dublin Metropolitan Junction Railways."

=== Private acts ===
Short title	Citation	Royal assent
Long title
Bridgewater Estates Act 1865	28 & 29 Vict. c. 1 Pr.	5 July 1865
An Act to enlarge and amend the Powers and Provisions relating to the Management and Improvement of the Property subject to the Trusts of the Will of the Most Noble Francis late Duke of Bridgewater.
Earl of Winchilsea's Estate Act 1865	28 & 29 Vict. c. 2 Pr.	5 July 1865
An Act for modifying the Trusts of the Settled Estates of the Right Honourable George James Earl of Winchilsea and Nottingham, declared by his Marriage Settlement, and to take effect during his Lifetime, and of which the Short Title is "Earl of Winchilsea's Estate Act, 1865."
Baroness Windsor's Estate Act 1865	28 & 29 Vict. c. 3 Pr.	5 July 1865
An Act for the better carrying into effect of "Baroness Windsor's Estate Act, 1857." (Note: Baroness Windsor's Estate Act 1857 (20 & 21 Vict. c. 7 Pr.))
Rolle Estate Act 1865	28 & 29 Vict. c. 4 Pr.	5 July 1865
An Act for amending, extending, and enlarging the Powers and modifying certain Conditions as to Residence contained in the Will and Codicils of the Right Honourable John Lord Rolle deceased.
Lord Tredegar's Estate Act 1865	28 & 29 Vict. c. 5 Pr.	5 July 1865
An Act for confirming an Agreement between the Right Honourable Charles Morgan Robinson Lord Tredegar and Promoters of the Alexandra Dock Company for the Conveyance to the Company of Lands forming Part of his Settled Estates, and the making by Trustees of the Settlement of the Estates out of Trust Monies subject to the Settlement of a Contribution towards the Capital of the Company; and for other Purposes; and of which the Short Title is "Lord Tredegar's Estate Act, 1865."
Wynne's Estate Act 1865	28 & 29 Vict. c. 6 Pr.	5 July 1865
An Act for confirming Sales of Parts of an Estate called Garthmeilio, belonging to John Wynne Esquire, who has been found a Lunatic by Inquisition, and for authorizing the Sale of further Parts of the same Estate for the Purpose of paying Costs incurred in the Matter of his Lunacy, and certain of his private Debts.
Eliott's Trust Estate Act 1865	28 & 29 Vict. c. 7 Pr.	5 July 1865
An Act for enabling the Testamentary Trustees of Sir William Francis Eliott of Stobs and Wells, Baronet, deceased, to sell the Trust Estates or Parts thereof for the Purpose of paying off or providing for the Payment of the Debts which affect or which may be made to affect the same, and for other Purposes in relation thereto.
Rattray's Estate Act 1865	28 & 29 Vict. c. 8 Pr.	5 July 1865
An Act to authorize the borrowing of Money on the Security of the Entailed Estate of Downie Park in the County of Forfar, or the Sale of a Portion of the Estate, for the Purpose of paying the Debts and Legacies affecting the same.
Trinity College, Dublin Act 1865	28 & 29 Vict. c. 9 Pr.	5 July 1865
An Act for authorizing Sales of Fisheries and Bights of Fishing and other Hereditaments by the Provost of the College of the Holy and Undivided Trinity of Queen Elizabeth near Dublin in his Corporate Capacity; and for other Purposes.
Edwards' Disabilities Removal Act 1865 (Note: This act was not printed by the Queen's Printer)	28 & 29 Vict. c. 10 Pr.	5 July 1865
An Act to enable Abraham Edwards Clerk to exercise his Office of a Priest, and to hold any Benefice or Preferment in the United Church of England and Ireland.

=== Sources ===
- Rickards, George Kettilby (1865). The Statutes of the United Kingdom of Great Britain and Ireland. Vol. 27 Part 1. 28 & 29 Vict.—1865. London: Eyre & Spottiswoode – via Google Books. =
- Rickards, George Kettilby (1865). The Statutes of the United Kingdom of Great Britain and Ireland, 28 & 29 Victoria, 1865. London: Eyre & Spottiswoode – via Internet Archive.
- A Collection of the Public General Statutes passed in the Twenty-eighth and Twenty-ninth Years of the Reign of Her Majesty Queen Victoria. London: Eyre & Spottiswoode. 1865 – via Internet Archive.
- Journal of the House of Commons. Vol. 120. London: His Majesty's Stationery Office. pp. 3–461.
- Chronological Table of and Index to the Statutes. Vol. 1: To the End of the Session 59 Vict. Sess. 2 (1895) (13th ed.). London: Her Majesty's Stationery Office. 1896. pp. 419–424 – via Google Books.

== See also ==
- List of acts of the Parliament of the United Kingdom
