= List of acts of the Parliament of the United Kingdom from 1882 =

This is a complete list of acts of the Parliament of the United Kingdom for the year 1882.

Note that the first parliament of the United Kingdom was held in 1801; parliaments between 1707 and 1800 were either parliaments of Great Britain or of Ireland). For acts passed up until 1707, see the list of acts of the Parliament of England and the list of acts of the Parliament of Scotland. For acts passed from 1707 to 1800, see the list of acts of the Parliament of Great Britain. See also the list of acts of the Parliament of Ireland.

For acts of the devolved parliaments and assemblies in the United Kingdom, see the list of acts of the Scottish Parliament, the list of acts of the Northern Ireland Assembly, and the list of acts and measures of Senedd Cymru; see also the list of acts of the Parliament of Northern Ireland.

The number shown after each act's title is its chapter number. Acts passed before 1963 are cited using this number, preceded by the year(s) of the reign during which the relevant parliamentary session was held; thus the Union with Ireland Act 1800 is cited as "39 & 40 Geo. 3 c. 67", meaning the 67th act passed during the session that started in the 39th year of the reign of George III and which finished in the 40th year of that reign. Note that the modern convention is to use Arabic numerals in citations (thus "41 Geo. 3" rather than "41 Geo. III"). Acts of the last session of the Parliament of Great Britain and the first session of the Parliament of the United Kingdom are both cited as "41 Geo. 3". Acts passed from 1963 onwards are simply cited by calendar year and chapter number.

All modern acts have a short title, e.g. the Local Government Act 2003. Some earlier acts also have a short title given to them by later acts, such as by the Short Titles Act 1896.

== 45 & 46 Vict. ==
The third session of the 22nd Parliament of the United Kingdom, which met from 7 February 1882 until 2 December 1882.

=== Public general acts ===
Short title	Citation	Royal assent
Long title
Consolidated Fund (No. 1) Act 1882 (repealed)	45 & 46 Vict. c. 1	13 March 1882
An Act to apply the sum of Three hundred and thirteen thousand two hundred and seventy pounds out of the Consolidated Fund to the service of the year ending on the thirty-first day of March one thousand eight hundred and eighty-two. (Repealed by Statute Law Revision Act 1898 (61 & 62 Vict. c. 22))
Post Office (Reply Post Cards) Act 1882 (repealed)	45 & 46 Vict. c. 2	13 March 1882
An Act to authorise the use of Reply Post Cards. (Repealed by Post Office Act 1908 (8 Edw. 7. c. 48))
Slate Mines (Gunpowder) Act 1882 (repealed)	45 & 46 Vict. c. 3	29 March 1882
An Act to amend the Law relating to the use of Gunpowder in Slate Mines. (Repealed for England and Wales and Scotland by Statute Law Revision Act 1950 (14 Geo. 6. c. 6) and for Northern Ireland by Mines Act (Northern Ireland) 1969 (c. 6 (N.I.)))
Consolidated Fund (No. 2) Act 1882 (repealed)	45 & 46 Vict. c. 4	29 March 1882
An Act to apply certain sums out of the Consolidated Fund to the service of the years ending on the thirty-first day of March one thousand eight hundred and eighty-one, one thousand eight hundred and eighty-two, and one thousand eight hundred and eighty-three. (Repealed by Statute Law Revision Act 1898 (61 & 62 Vict. c. 22))
Duke of Albany (Establishment) Act 1882 (repealed)	45 & 46 Vict. c. 5	21 April 1882
An Act to enable Her Majesty to provide for the Establishment of His Royal Highness the Duke of Albany and Her Serene Highness Princess Helen Frederica Augusta of Waldeck and Pyrmont, and to settle an Annuity on Her Serene Highness. (Repealed by Statute Law Revision Act 1953 (2 & 3 Eliz. 2. c. 5))
General Police and Improvement (Scotland) Act 1882 (repealed)	45 & 46 Vict. c. 6	28 April 1882
An Act to amend the law in regard to householders under the General Police and Improvement Acts in Scotland. (Repealed by Burgh Police (Scotland) Act 1892 (55 & 56 Vict. c. 55))
Army (Annual) Act 1882 (repealed)	45 & 46 Vict. c. 7	28 April 1882
An Act to provide, during twelve months, for the Discipline and Regulation of the Army. (Repealed by Statute Law Revision Act 1898 (61 & 62 Vict. c. 22) and Revision of the Army and Air Force Acts (Transitional Provisions) Act 1955 (3 & 4 Eliz. 2. c. 20))
Consolidated Fund (No. 3) Act 1882 (repealed)	45 & 46 Vict. c. 8	19 May 1882
An Act to apply the sum of nine million two hundred and eighty-two thousand four hundred and thirty-five pounds out of the Consolidated Fund to the service of the year ending on the thirty-first day of March one thousand eight hundred and eighty-three. (Repealed by Statute Law Revision Act 1898 (61 & 62 Vict. c. 22))
Documentary Evidence Act 1882	45 & 46 Vict. c. 9	19 June 1882
An Act to amend the Documentary Evidence Act 1868, and other enactments relating to the evidence of documents by means of copies printed by the Government Printers.
Military Manoeuvres Act 1882 (repealed)	45 & 46 Vict. c. 10	19 June 1882
An Act for making provision for facilitating the Manoeuvres of Troops to be assembled during the present Summer. (Repealed by Statute Law Revision Act 1898 (61 & 62 Vict. c. 22))
Public Health (Scotland) Act 1867 Amendment Act 1882 (repealed)	45 & 46 Vict. c. 11	19 June 1882
An Act to amend the Public Health (Scotland) Act, 1867. (Note: Public Health (Scotland) Act 1867 (30 & 31 Vict. c. 101)) (Repealed by Public Health (Scotland) Act 1897 (60 & 61 Vict. c. 38))
Militia Storehouses Act 1882 (repealed)	45 & 46 Vict. c. 12	19 June 1882
An Act to amend the Law relating to the application of moneys arising from the sale of Militia Storehouses. (Repealed by Reserve Forces Act 1980 (c. 9))
Arklow Harbour Act 1882	45 & 46 Vict. c. 13	19 June 1882
An Act for the Improvement of Arklow Harbour.
Metropolis Management and Building Acts (Amendment) Act 1882 (repealed)	45 & 46 Vict. c. 14	19 June 1882
An Act to confer further powers upon the Metropolitan Board of Works with respect to Streets and Buildings in the Metropolis. (Repealed by London Building Act 1894 (57 & 58 Vict. c. ccxiii))
Commonable Rights Compensation Act 1882	45 & 46 Vict. c. 15	19 June 1882
An Act to provide for the better application of Moneys paid by way of Compensation for the compulsory acquisition of Common Lands and extinguishment of Rights of Common.
Irish Reproductive Loan Fund Amendment Act 1882 (repealed)	45 & 46 Vict. c. 16	19 June 1882
An Act to amend the Irish Reproductive Loan Fund Act, 1874. (Note: Irish Reproductive Loan Fund Act 1874 (37 & 38 Vict. c. 86)) (Repealed by Statute Law Revision Act (Northern Ireland) 1954 (c. 35 (N.I.)))
Customs and Inland Revenue Buildings (Ireland) Act 1882	45 & 46 Vict. c. 17	3 July 1882
An Act for the transfer of Property in Ireland held for the Service of Her Majesty's Customs and of the Inland Revenue to the Commissioners of Public Works in Ireland; and for other purposes relating thereto.
Public Schools (Scotland) Teachers Act 1882 (repealed)	45 & 46 Vict. c. 18	3 July 1882
An Act to regulate the procedure of School Boards in Scotland in the dismissal of Teachers. (Repealed by Education (Scotland) Act 1918 (8 & 9 Geo. 5. c. 48))
Interments (felo de se) Act 1882 (repealed)	45 & 46 Vict. c. 19	3 July 1882
An Act to amend the law relating to the interment of any person found felo de se. (Repealed by Suicide Act 1961 (9 & 10 Eliz. 2. c. 60))
Poor Rate Assessment and Collection Act 1869 Amendment Act 1882 (repealed)	45 & 46 Vict. c. 20	3 July 1882
An Act to amend the Poor Rate Assessment and Collection Act, 1869. (Note: Poor Rate Assessment and Collection Act 1869 (32 & 33 Vict. c. 41)) (Repealed by Rating and Valuation Act 1925 (15 & 16 Geo. 5. c. 90), for the Isles of Scilly by Rating and Valuation Act (Repeals, etc.) Order 1927 (SR&O 1927/90) and for the County of London by London County Council (General Powers) Act 1949 (12, 13 & 14 Geo. 6. c. lv))
Places of Worship Sites Amendment Act 1882	45 & 46 Vict. c. 21	12 July 1882
An Act to amend the Places of Worship Sites Act, 1873. (Note: Places of Worship Sites Act 1873 (36 & 37 Vict. c. 50))
Boiler Explosions Act 1882 (repealed)	45 & 46 Vict. c. 22	12 July 1882
An Act to make better provision for Inquiries with regard to Boiler Explosions. (Repealed for England and Wales and Scotland by Notification of Accidents and Dangerous Occurrences Regulations 1980 (SI 1980/804) and for Northern Ireland by Notification of Accidents and Dangerous Occurrences Regulations (Northern Ireland) 1981 (SR 1981/339))
Public Health (Fruit Pickers Lodgings) Act 1882 (repealed)	45 & 46 Vict. c. 23	12 July 1882
An Act to extend the Public Health Act, 1875, (Note: Public Health Act 1875 (38 & 39 Vict. c. 55)) to the making of Byelaws for Fruit Pickers. (Repealed by Public Health Act 1936 (26 Geo. 5 & 1 Edw. 8. c. 49))
Petty Sessions (Ireland) Act 1882 (repealed)	45 & 46 Vict. c. 24	12 July 1882
An Act to amend the Petty Sessions (Ireland) Act, 1851. (Note: Petty Sessions (Ireland) Act 1851 (14 & 15 Vict. c. 93)) (Repealed by Magistrates' Courts Act (Northern Ireland) 1964 (c. 21 (N.I.)))
Prevention of Crime (Ireland) Act 1882 (repealed)	45 & 46 Vict. c. 25	12 July 1882
An Act for the prevention of Crime in Ireland. (Repealed by Statute Law Revision Act 1898 (61 & 62 Vict. c. 22))
Election of Representative Peers (Ireland) Act 1882 (repealed)	45 & 46 Vict. c. 26	12 July 1882
An Act to amend the Law relating to the Election of Lords Temporal to serve in Parliament for Ireland. (Repealed by Statute Law (Repeals) Act 1971 (c. 52))
Highway Rate Assessment and Expenditure Act 1882 (repealed)	45 & 46 Vict. c. 27	12 July 1882
An Act to extend certain Provisions of the Poor Rate Assessment and Collection Act, 1869, to the Highway Rate, and for other purposes. (Repealed by Statute Law (Repeals) Act 1973 (c. 39))
Consolidated Fund (No. 4) Act 1882 (repealed)	45 & 46 Vict. c. 28	24 July 1882
An Act to apply the sum of five million seven hundred and three thousand eight hundred and ninety-one pounds out of the Consolidated Fund to the service of the year ending on the thirty-first day of March one thousand eight hundred and eighty-three. (Repealed by Statute Law Revision Act 1898 (61 & 62 Vict. c. 22))
County Court Amendment (Ireland) Act 1882 (repealed)	45 & 46 Vict. c. 29	24 July 1882
An Act to amend the Acts relating to the County Courts in Ireland, and to make better provision for Appeals under the said Acts. (Repealed by Judicature (Northern Ireland) Act 1978 (c. 23))
Baths and Wash Houses Act 1882 (repealed)	45 & 46 Vict. c. 30	24 July 1882
An Act to amend the Baths and Wash Houses Acts. (Repealed by Public Health Act 1936 (26 Geo. 5 & 1 Edw. 8. c. 49), Public Health (London) Act 1936 (26 Geo. 5 & 1 Edw. 8. c. 50) and City of London (Various Powers) Act 1960 (8 & 9 Eliz. 2. c. xxxvi))
Inferior Courts Judgments Extension Act 1882 (repealed)	45 & 46 Vict. c. 31	24 July 1882
An Act to render Judgments obtained in certain Inferior Courts in England, Scotland, and Ireland respectively, effectual in any other part of the United Kingdom. (Repealed by Civil Jurisdiction and Judgments Act 1982 (c. 27))
Public Offices Site Act 1882	45 & 46 Vict. c. 32	24 July 1882
An Act for the acquisition of Property and the provision of new Buildings for the Admiralty and War Office.
Metropolitan Board of Works (Money) Act 1882 (repealed)	45 & 46 Vict. c. 33	10 August 1882
An Act further to amend the Acts relating to the raising of Money by the Metropolitan Board of Works; and for other purposes. (Repealed by London County Council (Finance Consolidation) Act 1912 (2 & 3 Geo. 5. c. cv))
Beer Dealers' Retail Licences (Amendment) Act 1882 (repealed)	45 & 46 Vict. c. 34	10 August 1882
An Act to amend "The Beer Dealers' Retail Licences Act, 1880." (Note: Beer Dealers' Retail Licences Act 1880 (43 Vict. c. 6)) (Repealed for England and Wales by Licensing Act 1902 (2 Edw. 7. c. 28) and for Northern Ireland by Statute Law Revision Act (Northern Ireland) 1954 (c. 35 (N.I.)))
Friendly Societies (Quinquennial Returns) Act 1882 (repealed)	45 & 46 Vict. c. 35	10 August 1882
An Act to amend so much of "The Friendly Societies Act, 1875," (Note: Friendly Societies Act 1875 (38 & 39 Vict. c. 60)) as relates to quinquennial returns of sickness and mortality. (Repealed by Friendly Societies Act 1887 (50 & 51 Vict. c. 56))
Casual Poor Act 1882 (repealed)	45 & 46 Vict. c. 36	10 August 1882
An Act to amend the Pauper Inmates Discharge and Regulation Act, 1871. (Note: Pauper Inmates Discharge and Regulation Act 1871 (34 & 35 Vict. c. 108)) (Repealed by Poor Law Act 1927 (17 & 18 Geo. 5. c. 14))
Corn Returns Act 1882 (repealed)	45 & 46 Vict. c. 37	10 August 1882
An Act to amend the Law respecting the obtaining of Corn Returns. (Repealed by Agriculture and Horticulture Development Board Order 2008 (SI 2008/576))
Settled Land Act 1882	45 & 46 Vict. c. 38	10 August 1882
An Act for facilitating sales, leases, and other dispositions of settled land, and for promoting the execution of improvements thereon. (Repealed for Scotland by Abolition of Feudal Tenure etc. (Scotland) Act 2000 (asp 5))
Conveyancing Act 1882	45 & 46 Vict. c. 39	10 August 1882
An Act for further improving the Practice of Conveyancing; and for other purposes. (Repealed for England and Wales by Law of Property Act 1925 (15 & 16 Geo. 5. c. 20))
Copyright (Musical Compositions) Act 1882 (repealed)	45 & 46 Vict. c. 40	10 August 1882
An Act to amend the law of Copyright relating to Musical Compositions. (Repealed by Copyright Act 1911 (1 & 2 Geo. 5. c. 46))
Customs and Inland Revenue Act 1882 (repealed)	45 & 46 Vict. c. 41	10 August 1882
An Act to grant certain Duties of Customs and Inland Revenue, to alter other Duties, and to amend the Laws relating to Customs and Inland Revenue. (Repealed by Statute Law Revision Act 1898 (61 & 62 Vict. c. 22), Finance Act 1946 (9 & 10 Geo. 6. c. 64) and Statute Law Revision Act 1953 (2 & 3 Eliz. 2. c. 5))
Civil Imprisonment (Scotland) Act 1882	45 & 46 Vict. c. 42	18 August 1882
An Act to amend the Law relating to Civil Imprisonment in Scotland.
Bills of Sale Act (1878) Amendment Act 1882 or the Bills of Sale Act 1882	45 & 46 Vict. c. 43	18 August 1882
An Act to amend the Bills of Sale Act, 1878. (Note: Bills of Sale Act 1878 (41 & 42 Vict. c. 31))
Pensions Commutation Act 1882	45 & 46 Vict. c. 44	18 August 1882
An Act to authorise the Commutation of a portion of a Pension in pursuance of the Pensions Commutation Act, 1871. (Note: Pensions Commutation Act 1871 (34 & 35 Vict. c. 36))
Bombay Civil Fund Act 1882 (repealed)	45 & 46 Vict. c. 45	18 August 1882
An Act to make provision for the transfer of the Assets and Liabilities of the Provident Branch of the Bombay Civil Fund and other funds to the Secretary of State for India in Council. (Repealed by Statute Law (Repeals) Act 1981 (c. 19))
Isle of Man (Officers) Act 1882 (repealed)	45 & 46 Vict. c. 46	18 August 1882
An Act to amend the Isle of Man (Officers) Act, 1876. (Note: Isle of Man (Officers) Act 1876 (39 & 40 Vict. c. 43)) (Repealed by Isle of Man Act 1958 (6 & 7 Eliz. 2. c. 11))
Arrears of Rent (Ireland) Act 1882 (repealed)	45 & 46 Vict. c. 47	18 August 1882
An Act to make provision respecting certain Arrears of Rent in Ireland. (Repealed by Statute Law Revision Act 1953 (2 & 3 Eliz. 2. c. 5))
Reserve Forces Act 1882 (repealed)	45 & 46 Vict. c. 48	18 August 1882
An Act to consolidate the Acts relating to the Reserve Forces. (Repealed by Statute Law Revision Act 1898 (61 & 62 Vict. c. 22), Reserve Forces Act 1900 (63 & 64 Vict. c. 42), Reserve Forces Act 1906 (6 Edw. 7. c. 11), Territorial Army and Militia Act 1921 (11 & 12 Geo. 5. c. 37), Statute Law Revision Act 1950 (14 Geo. 6. c. 6), Army Reserve Act 1950 (14 Geo. 6. c. 32) and Air Force Reserve Act 1950 (14 Geo. 6. c. 33))
Militia Act 1882 (repealed)	45 & 46 Vict. c. 49	18 August 1882
An Act to consolidate the Acts relating to the Militia. (Repealed by Reserve Forces Act 1980 (c. 9))
Municipal Corporations Act 1882	45 & 46 Vict. c. 50	18 August 1882
An Act for consolidating, with Amendments, enactments relating to Municipal Corporations in England and Wales. (Repealed for Northern Ireland by Local Government Act (Northern Ireland) 1972 (c. 9 (N.I.)))
Government Annuities Act 1882 (repealed)	45 & 46 Vict. c. 51	18 August 1882
An Act to extend the Acts relating to the purchase of small Government Annuities and to assuring payments of money on death. (Repealed by Government Annuities Act 1929 (19 & 20 Geo. 5. c. 29))
Annual Turnpike Acts Continuance Act 1882 (repealed)	45 & 46 Vict. c. 52	18 August 1882
An Act to continue certain Turnpike Acts, and to repeal certain other Turnpike Acts; and for other purposes connected therewith. (Repealed by Statute Law (Repeals) Act 1981 (c. 19))
Entail (Scotland) Act 1882 (repealed)	45 & 46 Vict. c. 53	18 August 1882
An Act to amend the Law of Entail in Scotland. (Repealed by Abolition of Feudal Tenure etc. (Scotland) Act 2000 (asp 5))
Artizans Dwellings Act 1882 or the Artisans Dwellings Amendment Act 1882 (repealed)	45 & 46 Vict. c. 54	18 August 1882
An Act to amend the Artizans and Labourers Dwellings Acts. (Repealed by Housing of the Working Classes Act 1890 (53 & 54 Vict. c. 70))
Merchant Shipping (Expenses) Act 1882 (repealed)	45 & 46 Vict. c. 55	18 August 1882
An Act to amend the Law with respect to the Charges on and Payments to the Mercantile Marine Fund, and to Expenses of Prosecutions for Offences committed at Sea. (Repealed by Merchant Shipping Act 1894 (57 & 58 Vict. c. 60) and Statute Law Revision Act 1950 (14 Geo. 6. c. 6))
Electric Lighting Act 1882 (repealed)	45 & 46 Vict. c. 56	18 August 1882
An Act to facilitate and regulate the supply of Electricity for Lighting and other purposes in Great Britain and Ireland. (Repealed by Electricity Act 1989 (c. 29))
County Courts (Costs and Salaries) Act 1882 (repealed)	45 & 46 Vict. c. 57	18 August 1882
An Act to amend the law relating to Costs and Salaries in County Courts. (Repealed by County Courts Act 1888 (51 & 52 Vict. c. 43))
Divided Parishes and Poor Law Amendment Act 1882 (repealed)	45 & 46 Vict. c. 58	18 August 1882
An Act to amend the Divided Parishes and Poor Law Amendment Act, 1876; (Note: Divided Parishes and Poor Law Amendment Act 1876 (39 & 40 Vict. c. 61)) and for other purposes. (Repealed by Local Government Act 1933 (23 & 24 Geo. 5. c. 51))
Educational Endowments (Scotland) Act 1882 (repealed)	45 & 46 Vict. c. 59	18 August 1882
An Act to reorganise the Educational Endowments of Scotland. (Repealed by Education (Scotland) Act 1945 (8 & 9 Geo. 6. c. 37) and Education (Scotland) Act 1946 (9 & 10 Geo. 6. c. 72))
Labourers Cottages and Allotments (Ireland) Act 1882 (repealed)	45 & 46 Vict. c. 60	18 August 1882
An Act to amend and extend the provisions of the Land Law (Ireland) Act, 1881, (Note: Land Law (Ireland) Act 1881 (44 & 45 Vict. c. 49)) relating to Labourers' Cottages and Allotments. (Repealed by Statute Law Revision Act 1953 (2 & 3 Eliz. 2. c. 5))
Bills of Exchange Act 1882	45 & 46 Vict. c. 61	18 August 1882
An Act to codify the law relating to Bills of Exchange, Cheques, and Promissory Notes.
Public Works Loans Act 1882 (repealed)	45 & 46 Vict. c. 62	18 August 1882
An Act to grant Money for the purpose of Loans by the Public Works Loan Commissioners and the Commissioners of Public Works in Ireland and the Irish Land Commission; and for other purposes relating to Loans by those Commissioners. (Repealed by Statute Law (Repeals) Act 2004 (c. 14))
Constabulary (Ireland) Amendment Act 1882 (repealed)	45 & 46 Vict. c. 63	18 August 1882
An Act to amend the Acts regulating the pay of certain officers of the Royal Irish Constabulary Force, and for other purposes connected therewith. (Repealed by Statute Law Revision Act (Northern Ireland) 1954 (c. 35 (N.I.)))
Expiring Laws Continuance Act 1882 (repealed)	45 & 46 Vict. c. 64	18 August 1882
An Act to continue various expiring Laws. (Repealed by Statute Law Revision Act 1898 (61 & 62 Vict. c. 22))
Prison Charities Act 1882 (repealed)	45 & 46 Vict. c. 65	18 August 1882
An Act to make provision respecting certain Prison Charities. (Repealed by Charities Act 1960 (8 & 9 Eliz. 2. c. 58))
Passenger Vessels Licences Amendment (Scotland) Act 1882 (repealed)	45 & 46 Vict. c. 66	18 August 1882
An Act to amend the Law relating to Licences to retail Intoxicating Liquors on Passenger Vessels in Scotland. (Repealed by Customs and Excise Act 1952 (15 & 16 Geo. 6 & 1 Eliz. 2. c. 44))
South Wales Turnpike Roads Amendment Act 1882 (repealed)	45 & 46 Vict. c. 67	18 August 1882
An Act to further amend the Law relating to Turnpike Roads in South Wales. (Repealed by Highways Act 1959 (7 & 8 Eliz. 2. c. 25))
Corrupt Practices (Suspension of Elections) Act 1882 (repealed)	45 & 46 Vict. c. 68	18 August 1882
An Act to suspend for a limited period, on account of Corrupt Practices, the holding of an Election of a Member or Members to serve in Parliament for certain cities and boroughs. (Repealed by Statute Law Revision Act 1898 (61 & 62 Vict. c. 22))
Intermediate Education (Ireland) Act 1882 (repealed)	45 & 46 Vict. c. 69	18 August 1882
An Act to amend the Intermediate Education (Ireland) Act, 1878. (Note: Intermediate Education (Ireland) Act 1878 (41 & 42 Vict. c. 66)) (Repealed by Education Act (Northern Ireland) 1923 (13 & 14 Geo. 5. c. 21 (N.I.)))
Supreme Court of Judicature (Ireland) Act 1882 (repealed)	45 & 46 Vict. c. 70	18 August 1882
An Act to amend the Supreme Court of Judicature Act (Ireland), 1877. (Note: Supreme Court of Judicature Act (Ireland) 1877 (40 & 41 Vict. c. 57)) (Repealed by Judicature (Northern Ireland) Act 1978 (c. 23))
Appropriation Act 1882 (repealed)	45 & 46 Vict. c. 71	18 August 1882
An Act to apply a sum out of the Consolidated Fund to the service of the year ending on the thirty-first day of March one thousand eight hundred and eighty-three, and to appropriate the Supplies granted in this Session of Parliament. (Repealed by Statute Law Revision Act 1898 (61 & 62 Vict. c. 22))
Revenue, Friendly Societies, and National Debt Act 1882	45 & 46 Vict. c. 72	18 August 1882
An Act for amending the Laws relating to Customs and Inland Revenue, and Postage and other Stamps, and for making further provision respecting the National Debt and charges payable out of the public revenue or by the Commissioners for the Reduction of the National Debt; and for other purposes.
Ancient Monuments Protection Act 1882 (repealed)	45 & 46 Vict. c. 73	18 August 1882
An Act for the better protection of Ancient Monuments. (Repealed for England and Wales and Scotland by Ancient Monuments Consolidation and Amendment Act 1913 (3 & 4 Geo. 5. c. 32) and Ancient Monuments and Archaeological Areas Act 1979 (c. 46) and for Northern Ireland by Ancient Monuments (Northern Ireland) Act 1926 (c. 12 (N.I.)))
Post Office (Parcels) Act 1882 (repealed)	45 & 46 Vict. c. 74	18 August 1882
An Act to amend the Post Office Acts with respect to the Conveyance of Parcels. (Repealed by Post Office Act 1953 (1 & 2 Eliz. 2. c. 36))
Married Women's Property Act 1882	45 & 46 Vict. c. 75	18 August 1882
An Act to consolidate and amend the Acts relating to the Property of Married Women.
Merchant Shipping (Colonial Inquiries) Act 1882 (repealed)	45 & 46 Vict. c. 76	18 August 1882
An Act to amend the Merchant Shipping Acts, 1854 to 1880, with respect to Colonial Courts of Inquiry. (Repealed by Merchant Shipping Act 1894 (57 & 58 Vict. c. 60))
Citation Amendment (Scotland) Act 1882	45 & 46 Vict. c. 77	18 August 1882
An Act to amend the law of Citation in Scotland.
Fishery Board (Scotland) Act 1882 (repealed)	45 & 46 Vict. c. 78	18 August 1882
An Act to establish a Fishery Board for Scotland. (Repealed by Salmon Act 1986 (c. 62))
India (Home Charges Arrears) Act 1882 (repealed)	45 & 46 Vict. c. 79	18 August 1882
An Act to make provision for the arrangement of Accounts between the Commissioners of Her Majesty's Treasury and the Secretary of State in Council of India in respect of certain Home Charges for Her Majesty’s Forces serving in India. (Repealed by Statute Law Revision Act 1898 (61 & 62 Vict. c. 22))
Allotments Extension Act 1882 (repealed)	45 & 46 Vict. c. 80	18 August 1882
An Act for the Extension of Allotments. (Repealed by Statute Law (Repeals) Act 1993 (c. 50))
Somersham Rectory Act 1882	45 & 46 Vict. c. 81	18 August 1882
An Act for disannexing the Rectory of Somersham from the office of Regius Professor of Divinity in the University of Cambridge, and for making better provision for the cure of Souls within the said Rectory; and for other purposes.
Lunacy Regulation Amendment Act 1882 (repealed)	45 & 46 Vict. c. 82	18 August 1882
An Act for amending the Lunacy Regulation Acts. (Repealed by Lunacy Act 1890 (53 & 54 Vict. c. 5))

=== Local acts ===
Short title	Citation	Royal assent
Long title
Tees Pilotage Order Confirmation Act 1882 (repealed)	45 & 46 Vict. c. i	29 March 1882
An Act to confirm a Provisional Order made by the Board of Trade under the Merchant Shipping Act Amendment Act, 1862, (Note: Merchant Shipping Act Amendment Act 1862 (25 & 26 Vict. c. 63)) relating to the pilotage of the River Tees. (Repealed by Pilotage Orders Confirmation (No. 2) Act 1922 (12 & 13 Geo. 5. c. xiii))
	Tees Pilotage Order 1881 (Note: Although passed in 1882, the short title is specified as the Tees Pilotage Order 1881.) Order for Constituting a Pilotage Commission for the River Tees, and for regulating their jurisdiction.	
London and Saint Katharine Docks Act 1882 (repealed)	45 & 46 Vict. c. ii	21 April 1882
An Act to enable the London and Saint Katharine Docks Company to raise further Money and to maintain their Railway from the North Woolwich Branch of the Great Eastern Railway to Galleons Reach and for other purposes. (Repealed by Port of London (Consolidation) Act 1920 (10 & 11 Geo. 5. c. clxxiii))
Drainage and Improvement of Lands Supplemental Act (Ireland) 1882 or the Drainage and Improvement of Lands Supplemental (Ireland) Act 1882	45 & 46 Vict. c. iii	28 April 1882
An Act to confirm a Provisional Order under the Drainage and Improvement of Lands (Ireland) Act, 1863, (Note: Drainage and Improvement of Lands (Ireland) Act 1863 (26 & 27 Vict. c. 88)) and the Acts amending the same relating to Cahermone District.
	Cahermone Order 1882 In the matter of the Cahermone Drainage District, in the county of Cork.	
Metropolitan Commons Supplemental Act 1882	45 & 46 Vict. c. iv	28 April 1882
An Act to confirm Schemes under the Metropolitan Commons Act, 1866, (Note: Metropolitan Commons Act 1866 (29 & 30 Vict. c. 122)) and the Metropolitan Commons Amendment Act, 1869, (Note: Metropolitan Commons Amendment Act 1869 (32 & 33 Vict. c. 107)) relating respectively to Acton Commons, Chiswick and Turnham Green Commons, and Tottenham Commons.
	Scheme with respect to Acton Commons.	
	Scheme with respect to Chiswick and Turnham Green Commons.	
	Scheme with respect to Tottenham Commons.	
London, Brighton, and South Coast Railway (Capital) Act 1882	45 & 46 Vict. c. v	28 April 1882
An Act to enable the London Brighton and South Coast Railway Company to raise further Capital.
Maidstone Waterworks Act 1882	45 & 46 Vict. c. vi	28 April 1882
An Act for granting further powers to the Maidstone Waterworks Company.
Caledonian Railway (Additional Capital) Act 1882	45 & 46 Vict. c. vii	19 May 1882
An Act for enabling the Caledonian Railway Company to raise additional Money.
Bristol Port and Channel Dock Company (Extension of Time) Act 1882	45 & 46 Vict. c. viii	19 May 1882
An Act to revive the powers and extend the period for the compulsory purchase of lands and to extend the period for the completion of the Works authorised by the Bristol Port and Channel Dock Act 1877 (Note: Bristol Port and Channel Dock Act 1877 (40 & 41 Vict. c. lxv)) and for other purposes.
City of London Court Act 1882	45 & 46 Vict. c. ix	19 May 1882
An Act for enabling the mayor and commonalty and citizens of the City of London to take lands with a view to the enlargement and improvement of the court house of the City of London Court and for other purposes.
Saint Philip's Church (Liverpool) Act 1882	45 & 46 Vict. c. x	19 May 1882
An Act to authorise the sale of the existing Church of Saint Philip (Note: St Philip's Church, Hardman Street, Liverpool.) in the City of Liverpool and of the site thereof and purchase of a site for and the erection of a new church and to provide for the appointment of Trustees and other relative matters.
Fulwood and Whittingham Water Act 1882 (repealed)	45 & 46 Vict. c. xi	19 May 1882
An Act to transfer to the Local Board for the District of Fulwood in the County Palatine of Lancaster the Powers conferred by the Lancashire County Justices Act 1880 (Note: Lancashire County Justices Act 1880 (43 & 44 Vict. c. xxi)) for constructing Waterworks and supplying Water to the Whittingham County Lunatic Asylum, and to authorise the Local Board to supply Water within their District and other Places, and to make further provisions in that behalf, (Repealed by County of Lancashire Act 1984 (c. xxi))
Abbotsbury Railway Act 1882	45 & 46 Vict. c. xii	19 May 1882
An Act to confer further powers on the Abbotsbury Railway Company; to revive the powers and extend the period for the compulsory purchase of lands; for the construction of portions of the railway authorised by the Abbotsbury Railway Act, 1877; (Note: Abbotsbury Railway Act 1877 (40 & 41 Vict. c. ccxi)) for making a diversion of part of their authorised line and for other purposes.
King's College London Act 1882 (repealed)	45 & 46 Vict. c. xiii	19 May 1882
An Act to amend the Constitution of King's College London and for other purposes relating thereto. (Repealed by King's College London Act 1978 (c. xii))
Birkenhead Borough (Quarter Sessions) Act 1882	45 & 46 Vict. c. xiv	19 May 1882
An Act to continue the Liability of the borough of Birkenhead to contribute to the Expenses of the Local Authority of the county of Chester under the Contagious Diseases (Animals) Acts in the event of a grant of a separate Court of Quarter Sessions to the said borough.
Limavady and Dungiven Railway Act 1882	45 & 46 Vict. c. xv	19 May 1882
An Act to authorise the Limavady and Dungiven Railway Company to acquire additional lands to confirm an agreement with the Skinners' Company to attach a preference to certain shares to authorise the Belfast and Northern Counties Railway Company to subscribe and lend further sums and to raise further capital and for other purposes.
Merionethshire Railway (Extension of Time) Act 1882 (repealed)	45 & 46 Vict. c. xvi	19 May 1882
An Act to further extend the Time for the Completion of the Merionethshire Railway. (Repealed by Merionethshire Railway (Abandonment) Act 1887 (50 & 51 Vict. c. cviii))
Great North of Scotland Railway (Consolidation and Conversion of Stocks) Act 1882	45 & 46 Vict. c. xvii	19 May 1882
An Act to consolidate and convert certain of the Shares and Stocks in the Capital of the Great North of Scotland Railway Company; and for other purposes.
Great North of Scotland Railway (Various Powers) Act 1882	45 & 46 Vict. c. xviii	19 May 1882
An Act to confer further powers on the Great North of Scotland Railway Company.
Glasgow Corporation and Police Act 1882 (repealed)	45 & 46 Vict. c. xix	19 May 1882
An Act to confer further powers on the Lord Provost, magistrates and council of the city and royal burgh of Glasgow; and for other purposes. (Repealed by Statute Law (Repeals) Act 1995 (c. 44))
Teign Valley Railway Act 1882	45 & 46 Vict. c. xx	19 May 1882
An Act to confer further powers on the Teign Valley Railway Company; and for other purposes.
Shardlow (Cavendish) and Sawley (Harrington) Bridges Act 1882	45 & 46 Vict. c. xxi	19 May 1882
An Act for vesting the bridge at Sawley across the River Trent in the counties of Derby and Leicester commonly known as Harrington Bridge in the Trustees of the bridge at Shardlow across the said river in the said counties commonly known as Cavendish Bridge and for suspending the taking of toll upon the same and for other purposes.
North-eastern Railway Company's (Alnwick and Cornhill Branch) Act 1882	45 & 46 Vict. c. xxii	19 May 1882
An Act for enabling the North-eastern Railway Company to construct a Railway from Alnwick to Cornhill in the county of Northumberland; and for other purposes.
Alnwick Corporation Act 1882	45 & 46 Vict. c. xxiii	19 May 1882
An Act for enlarging the Powers of the Corporation of the Borough of Alnwick and for vesting in the Corporation the Forest of Aydon otherwise Haydon or Alnwick Moor in the County of Northumberland and for other purposes.
Horncastle Water Act 1882	45 & 46 Vict. c. xxiv	19 May 1882
An Act for incorporating the Horncastle Water Company, and for better supplying with Water the Town of Horncastle, in the County of Lincoln, and the several places adjacent thereto; and for other purposes.
Agricultural Company of Mauritius Act 1882	45 & 46 Vict. c. xxv	19 May 1882
An Act to extend the objects of the Agricultural Company of Mauritius, Limited, and its powers for the transaction of its business and investment of its moneys.
Local Government Board's Provisional Order Confirmation (Highways) Act 1882	45 & 46 Vict. c. xxvi	19 June 1882
An Act to confirm a Provisional Order of the Local Government Board under the Highways and Locomotives (Amendment) Act, 1878, (Note: Highways and Locomotives (Amendment) Act 1878 (41 & 42 Vict. c. 77)) relating to the county of Kent.
	Kent Order 1882 County of Kent. Provisional Order as to a certain Disturnpiked Road.	
Commons Regulation (Crosby Garrett and Stivichall Commons) Provisional Order Confirmation Act 1882	45 & 46 Vict. c. xxvii	19 June 1882
An Act to confirm the Provisional Orders for the regulation of certain lands known as Crosby Garrett Common, in the parish of Crosby Garrett, in the county of Westmoreland; and for the regulation of certain lands known as Stivichall Common, in the parish of St. Michael, Coventry, in the county of Warwick.
	Crosby Garrett Order 1882 Crosby Garrett. Provisional Order for the Inclosure of a Common.	
	Stivichall Common Order 1882 Stivichall. Provisional Order for the Inclosure of a Common.	
Inclosure (Arkleside) Provisional Order Confirmation Act 1882	45 & 46 Vict. c. xxviii	19 June 1882
An Act to confirm the Provisional Order for the inclosure of certain lands known as Arkleside Common, situate in the Parish of Coverham, in the North Riding of Yorkshire, in pursuance of a Report of the Inclosure Commissioners for England and Wales.
	Arkleside Common Order 1882 Provisional Order for the Inclosure of a Common.	
Inclosure (Bettws Disserth) Provisional Order Confirmation Act 1882	45 & 46 Vict. c. xxix	19 June 1882
An Act to confirm the Provisional Order for the inclosure of certain lands known as Bettws Disserth Common, situate in the Parish of Bettws Disserth, in the County of Radnor, in pursuance of a Report of the Inclosure Commissioners for England and Wales.
	Bettws Disserth Common Order 1882 Provisional Order for the Inclosure of a Common.	
Inclosure (Cefn Drawen) Provisional Order Confirmation Act 1882	45 & 46 Vict. c. xxx	19 June 1882
An Act to confirm the Provisional Order for the inclosure of certain lands known as Cefh Drawen Common, situate in the Parish of Glascwm, in the County of Radnor, in pursuance of a Report of the Inclosure Commissioners for England and Wales.
	Cefn Drawen Order 1882 Provisional Order for the Inclosure of a Common.	
Local Government Board (Ireland) (Bangor Gas) Provisional Order Confirmation Act 1882	45 & 46 Vict. c. xxxi	19 June 1882
An Act to confirm a Provisional Order of the Local Government Board for Ireland relating to the Bangor Gas Undertaking.
	Bangor Gas Order 1882 Bangor Gas Undertaking. Provisional Order. Purchase of existing Gasworks, &c. under the Gas and Water Facilities Acts, 1870 (Note: Gas and Water Works Facilities Act 1870 (33 & 34 Vict. c. 70)) and 1873, (Note: Gas and Water Works Facilities Act 1870 Amendment Act 1873 (36 & 37 Vict. c. 89)) and the Public Health (Ireland) Acts, 1878 (Note: Public Health (Ireland) Act 1878 (41 & 42 Vict. c. 52)) and 1879. (Note: Public Health (Ireland) Amendment Act 1879 (42 & 43 Vict. c. 57))	
Local Government Board (Ireland) Provisional Orders Confirmation (Ballymena, &c.) Act 1882	45 & 46 Vict. c. xxxii	19 June 1882
An Act to confirm certain Provisional Orders of the Local Government Board for Ireland relating to the towns of Ballymena, Clonmel, Fermoy, and Letterkenny.
	Ballymena Town Provisional Order 1882 Town of Ballymena. Provisional Order.	
	Clonmel Provisional Order 1882 Borough of Clonmel. Provisional Order	
	Fermoy Waterworks Provisional Order 1882 Fermoy Waterworks. Provisional Order.	
	Letterkenny Town Provisional Order 1882 Town of Letterkenny. Provisional Order.	
Local Government Board's Provisional Orders Confirmation Act 1882	45 & 46 Vict. c. xxxiii	19 June 1882
An Act to confirm certain Provisional Orders of the Local Government Board relating to the City and County of Bristol, the Local Government District of Bromley, the Port of Cardiff, the Rural Sanitary District of the Glendale Union, the Borough of Hastings, the Local Government District of Merthyr Tydfil, the Boroughs of Newport (Monmouthshire) and Portsmouth, the Local Government District of Sandal Magna, and the Rural Sanitary District of the Ware Union.
	Bristol Order 1882 Provisional Order for altering and amending a Confirming Act. (Note: Local Government Supplemental Act 1869 (32 & 33 Vict. c. cxxiv))	
	Bromley Order 1882 Provisional Order to enable the Sanitary Authority for the Urban Sanitary District of Bromley to put in force the Compulsory Clauses of the Lands Clauses Consolidation Acts, 1845, (Note: Lands Clauses Consolidation Act 1845 (8 & 9 Vict. c. 18)) 1860, (Note: Lands Clauses Consolidation Acts Amendment Act 1860 (23 & 24 Vict. c. 106)) and 1869. (Note: Lands Clauses Consolidation Act 1869 (32 & 33 Vict. c. 18))	
	Cardiff Order 1882 Provisional Order for permanently constituting a Port Sanitary Authority, and for other purposes.	
	Glendale Union Order 1882 Provisional Order to enable the Sanitary Authority for the Rural Sanitary District of the Glendale Union to put in force the Compulsory Clauses of the Lands Clauses Consolidation Acts, 1845, 1860, and 1869.	
	Hastings Order 1882 Provisional Order to enable the Urban Sanitary Authority for the Borough of Hastings to put in force the Compulsory Clauses of the Lands Clauses Consolidation Acts, 1845, 1860, and 1869.	
	Merthyr Tydfil Order 1882 Provisional Order to enable the Sanitary Authority for the Urban Sanitary District of Merthyr Tydfil to put in force the Compulsory Clauses of the Lands Clauses Consolidation Acts, 1845, 1860, and 1869.	
	Newport (Mon.) Order 1882 Provisional Order to enable the Urban Sanitary Authority for the Borough of Newport to put in force the Compulsory Clauses of the Lands Clauses Consolidation Acts, 1845, 1860, and 1869.	
	Portsmouth Order 1882 Provisional Order to enable the Urban Sanitary Authority for the Borough of Portsmouth to put in force the Compulsory Clauses of the Lands Clauses Consolidation Acts, 1845, 1860, and 1869.	
	Sandal Magna Order 1882 Provisional Order to enable the Sanitary Authority for the Urban Sanitary District of Sandal Magna to put in force the Compulsory Clauses of the Lands Clauses Consolidation Acts, 1845, 1860, and 1869.	
	Ware Union Order 1882 Provisional Order to enable the Sanitary Authority for the Rural Sanitary District of the Ware Union, to put in force the Compulsory Clauses of the Lands Clauses Consolidation Acts, 1845, 1860, and 1869.	
Local Government Board's Provisional Orders Confirmation (Poor Law) Act 1882	45 & 46 Vict. c. xxxiv	19 June 1882
An Act to confirm certain Orders of the Local Government Board under the provisions of the Divided Parishes and Poor Law Amendment Act, 1876, (Note: Divided Parishes and Poor Law Amendment Act 1876 (39 & 40 Vict. c. 61)) as amended and extended by the Poor Law Act, 1879, (Note: Poor Law Act 1879 (42 & 43 Vict. c. 54)) relating to the Parishes of Barmbrough, Burghwallis, Coleshill, Conisbrough, Forrest Hill, Hickleton, Inglesham, Kirk Bramwith, Kirk Sandall and Trumfleet, Shotover, and Shotover Hill Place, and to the Townships of Adwick-le-Street, Askern, Barnby-upon-Don or Barnby Dunn, Campsall, Dalton, Ecclesfield, Helmington Row, Langthwaite-with-Tilts, Mexbrough, Moss, Owston, Thorpe-in-Balne, and Willington.
	Townships of Helmington Row and Willington Order 1882 Auckland and Durham Unions.	
	Parishes of Barmbrough, Burghwallis, Conisbrough, Hickleton, Kirk Bramwith and Kirk Sandall and Trumfleet, and Townships of Adwick-le-Street, Askern, Barnby-upon-Don or Barnby Dunn, Campsall, Langthwaite-with-Tilts, Mexbrough, Moss, Owston, and Thorpe-in Balne Order 1882; Doncaster Union.	
	Parishes of Coleshill and Inglesham Order 1882 Faringdon and Highworth and Swindon Unions.	
	Parishes of Forrest Hill, Shotover and Shotover Hill Place Order 1882 Headington Union.	
	Townships of Dalton and Ecclesfield Order 1882 Rotherham and Wortley Unions.	
Glasgow and South Western Railway Act 1882	45 & 46 Vict. c. xxxv	19 June 1882
An Act for conferring further powers on the Glasgow and South-western Railway Company for the construction of works the acquisition of lands and the raising of money and for other purposes.
Millwall Dock Act 1882 (repealed)	45 & 46 Vict. c. xxxvi	19 June 1882
An Act for conferring further powers on the Millwall Dock Company and for other purposes. (Repealed by Port of London (Consolidation) Act 1920 (10 & 11 Geo. 5. c. clxxiii))
West Ham Local Board Extension of Powers Act 1882 (repealed)	45 & 46 Vict. c. xxxvii	19 June 1882
An Act for enabling the Local Board for the district of West Ham, in the county of Essex, to require payment of fees by persons constructing or altering buildings within their district, and extending the powers of the Board as to making byelaws with respect to pollution of water in dwelling-houses and factories, and as to ventilating and protecting dwellings from fire, and for other purposes. (Repealed by Local Law (London Borough of Newham) Order 1965 (SI 1965/509))
South Metropolitan Gas Act 1882	45 & 46 Vict. c. xxxviii	19 June 1882
An Act to authorise the South Metropolitan Gas Company to purchase additional lands construct additional works enlarge their borrowing powers and amend their Acts.
Portsoy Harbour Act 1882 (repealed)	45 & 46 Vict. c. xxxix	19 June 1882
An Act for providing for the Transfer of the Harbour of Portsoy by the Earl of Seafield for constructing new Harbour Works and for providing for the application of Alexander Rainy's Bequest towards the said Harbour and for other purposes. (Repealed by Grampian Regional Council (Harbours) Order Confirmation Act 1987 (c. x))
Bromsgrove Gas Act 1882	45 & 46 Vict. c. xl	19 June 1882
An Act for incorporating and conferring powers on the Bromsgrove Gas Company and for other purposes.
Welshpool and Llanfair Railway (Abandonment) Act 1882 (repealed)	45 & 46 Vict. c. xli	19 June 1882
An Act for the abandonment of the Welshpool and Llanfair Railway the repayment of the money deposited for securing its completion and the dissolution of the Welshpool and Llanfair Railway Company. (Repealed by Statute Law (Repeals) Act 2013 (c. 2))
William Harris Endowment and Dundee Education Act 1882	45 & 46 Vict. c. xlii	19 June 1882
An Act for extending and amending the Constitution of the High School of Dundee; authorising the establishment, within the burgh of Dundee, of an additional Public School, under the management of the School Board of Dundee; and for confirming an Agreement between William Harris, Esquire, the High School Corporation and the School Board; and for other purposes.
Dundee Water Act 1882 (repealed)	45 & 46 Vict. c. xliii	19 June 1882
An Act for enabling the Dundee Water Commissioners to construct additional Works, and to create and issue Debenture Stock, and for other purposes. (Repealed by Dundee Corporation (Water, Transport, Finance, &c.) Order Confirmation Act 1954 (2 & 3 Eliz. 2. c. ix))
Callander and Oban Railway Act 1882	45 & 46 Vict. c. xliv	19 June 1882
An Act for authorising the Callander and Oban Railway Company to raise additional capital; and for other purposes.
South Essex Waterworks Act 1882	45 & 46 Vict. c. xlv	19 June 1882
An Act for extending the limits of supply of the South Essex Waterworks Company and for authorising that Company to construct further works and to raise further money and for other purposes.
Lower Thames Valley Main Sewerage Board Act 1882	45 & 46 Vict. c. xlvi	19 June 1882
An Act to authorise the Lower Thames Valley Main Sewerage Board to defray expenses incurred by them in relation to the promotion of a certain Bill in Parliament in the session of 1879.
Dublin, Wicklow, and Wexford Railway Act 1882	45 & 46 Vict. c. xlvii	19 June 1882
An Act to enable the Dublin Wicklow and Wexford Railway Company to construct certain diversion railways of their authorised line and to confer further powers on the Company with reference to their undertaking and for other purposes.
Moffat Railway Act 1882	45 & 46 Vict. c. xlviii	19 June 1882
An Act to enable the Moffat Railway Company to construct a railway to the Beattock Station of the Caledonian Railway Company and for other purposes.
Golden Valley Railway Act 1882	45 & 46 Vict. c. xlix	19 June 1882
An Act to extend the time for the completion of the railway authorised by the Golden Valley Railway (Extension to Hay) Act, 1877; (Note: Golden Valley Railway (Extension to Hay) Act 1877 (40 & 41 Vict. c. clxxvii)) to authorise the Golden Valley Railway Company to issue preference shares and to borrow money for payment of debts.
North Eastern Railway (Additional Powers) Act 1882	45 & 46 Vict. c. l	19 June 1882
An Act for enabling the North-eastern Railway Company to make new Railways and for conferring additional Powers on the Company in relation to their Undertaking and for vesting in them the Undertaking of the Tees Valley Railway Company; and for other purposes.
Ipswich Tramways Act 1882	45 & 46 Vict. c. li	19 June 1882
An Act for conferring further powers upon the Ipswich Tramways Company.
North British and Mercantile Insurance Company's Act 1882 (repealed)	45 & 46 Vict. c. lii	19 June 1882
An Act for regulating the capital and making further provision for the management of the North British and Mercantile Insurance Company. (Repealed by North British and Mercantile Insurance Company's Act 1920 (10 & 11 Geo. 5. c. cxxxii))
Caledonian Railway (Further Powers) Act 1882	45 & 46 Vict. c. liii	19 June 1882
An Act for enabling the Caledonian Railway Company to make railways and other works, and abandon authorised and existing works, in and near the city of Glasgow, to divert a road at Lochmaben, and to acquire lands and works in the counties of Stirling, Perth, and Renfrew; and for other purposes.
Blyth Harbour Act 1882	45 & 46 Vict. c. liv	19 June 1882
An Act to constitute and incorporate Commissioners for the management of Blyth Harbour in the county of Northumberland and to vest the harbour undertaking in them and empower them to construct additional works; and for other purposes.
Liverpool Improvement Act 1882 (repealed)	45 & 46 Vict. c. lv	19 June 1882
An Act for authorising the Corporation of the city of Liverpool to execute certain street improvements and to acquire and appropriate land for the University College Liverpool; for amending various Local Acts in force in the city; and for conferring on the Corporation further powers in relation to the grant of superannuation allowances to their officers and other matters. (Repealed by County of Merseyside Act 1980 (c. x))
Metropolitan Board of Works (Various Powers) Act 1882	45 & 46 Vict. c. lvi	19 June 1882
An Act to confer various powers on the Metropolitan Board of Works and to amend certain Acts relating to that Board.
Walton-on-the-Hill Vicarage Act 1882	45 & 46 Vict. c. lvii	19 June 1882
An Act to authorise the Trustees of the Liverpool Bishopric Endowment Fund to acquire the Advowson of the Vicarage of Walton-on-the-Hill in the county of Lancaster and for other purposes.
Pier and Harbour Orders Confirmation (No. 2) Act 1882	45 & 46 Vict. c. lviii	3 July 1882
An Act to confirm certain Provisional Orders made by the Board of Trade under the General Pier and Harbour Act, 1861, (Note: General Pier and Harbour Act 1861 (24 & 25 Vict. c. 45)) relating to Eyemouth, Greenock, and Rothesay.
	Eyemouth Harbour Order 1882 Order for repealing the Act (Note: Eyemouth Harbour Act 1839 (2 & 3 Vict. c. xxxvi)) with respect to the harbour of Eyemouth, in the county of Berwick, and the Eyemouth Harbour Order, 1874, and for making further provision for the construction of works and the maintenance and regulation of the harbour.	
	Greenock Harbour Order 1882 Order for amending the Greenock Harbour Acts, 1866, (Note: Greenock Port and Harbour Act 1866 (29 & 30 Vict. c. clvi)) 1867, (Note: Greenock Port and Harbours Act 1867 (30 & 31 Vict. c. xxxv)) 1872, (Note: Greenock Harbour Act 1872 (35 & 36 Vict. c. lxxi)) and 1880, (Note: Greenock Harbour Act 1880 (43 & 44 Vict. c. clxx)) and conferring further powers on the Trustees of the Port and Harbours of Greenock.	
	Rothesay Harbour Order 1882 Order for amending the Act (Note: Rothesay Harbour and Burgh Offices and Bute County Offices Act 1831 (1 & 2 Will. 4. c. xxxiv)) and Order relating to the Harbour of Rothesay and for conferring further powers on the Trustees of that Harbour.	
Local Government Board's Provisional Order Confirmation (Artizans and Labourers Dwellings) Act 1882 (repealed)	45 & 46 Vict. c. lix	3 July 1882
An Act to confirm a Provisional Order of the Local Government Board under the provisions of the Artizans and Labourers Dwellings Improvement Act, 1875, (Note: Artisans' and Labourers' Dwellings Improvement Act 1875 (38 & 39 Vict. c. 36)) relating to the Borough of Nottingham. (Repealed by Statute Law (Repeals) Act 1995 (c. 44))
	Nottingham (Artizans) Order 1882 Provisional Order for confirming an Improvement Scheme under the Artizans and Labourers Dwellings Improvement Act, 1875.	
Local Government Board's Provisional Orders Confirmation (No. 2) Act 1882	45 & 46 Vict. c. lx	3 July 1882
An Act to confirm certain Provisional Orders of the Local Government Board relating to the City and Borough of Bath, the Local Government District of Brierley Hill, the Borough of Burton-upon-Trent, the Rural Sanitary District of the Keighley Union, the Boroughs of Margate, Newbury, and Preston, the Town of Ramsgate, the Borough of Saint Helens, and the Rural Sanitary District of the Settle Union.
	Bath Order 1882 Provisional Order to enable the Urban Sanitary Authority for the City and Borough of Bath to put in force the Compulsory Clauses of the Lands Clauses Consolidation Acts, 1845, 1860, and 1869.	
	Brierley Hill Order 1882 Provisional Order to enable the Sanitary Authority for the Urban Sanitary District of Brierley Hill to put in force the Compulsory Clauses of the Lands Clauses Consolidation Acts, 1845, 1860, and 1869.	
	Burton-upon-Trent Order 1882 Provisional Order to enable the Urban Sanitary Authority for the Borough of Burton-upon-Trent to put in force the Compulsory Clauses of the Lands Clauses Consolidation Acts, 1845, 1860, and 1869.	
	Keighley Union Order 1882 Provisional Order to enable the Sanitary Authority for the Rural Sanitary District of the Keighley Union to put in force the Compulsory Clauses of the Lands Clauses Consolidation Acts, 1845, 1860, and 1869.	
	Margate Order 1882 Provisional Order to enable the Urban Sanitary Authority for the Borough of Margate, to put in force the Compulsory Clauses of the Lands Clauses Consolidation Acts, 1845, 1860, and 1869.	
	Newbury Order 1882 Provisional Order to enable the Urban Sanitary Authority for the Borough of Newbury to put in force the Compulsory Clauses of the Lands Clauses Consolidation Acts, 1845, 1860, and 1869.	
	Preston Order 1882 Provisional Order to enable the Urban Sanitary Authority for the Borough of Preston to put in force the Compulsory Clauses of the Lands Clauses Consolidation Acts, 1845, 1860, and 1869.	
	Ramsgate Order 1882 Provisional Order to enable the Sanitary Authority for the Urban Sanitary District of Ramsgate to put in force the Compulsory Clauses of the Lands Clauses Consolidation Acts, 1845, 1860, and 1869.	
	Saint Helens Order 1882 Provisional Order to enable the Urban Sanitary Authority for the Borough of Saint Helens to put in force the Compulsory Člauses of the Lands Clauses Consolidation Acts, 1845, 1860, and 1869.	
	Settle Union Order 1882 Provisional Order to enable the Sanitary Authority for the Rural Sanitary District of the Settle Union to put in force the Compulsory Clauses of the Lands Clauses Consolidation Acts, 1845, 1860, and 1869.	
Local Government Board's Provisional Orders Confirmation (No. 3) Act 1882	45 & 46 Vict. c. lxi	3 July 1882
An Act to confirm certain Provisional Orders of the Local Government Board relating to the Borough of Birmingham (two), the Local Government Districts of Gainsborough, Smethwick, and South Blyth, the Borough of Stafford, the Staines Joint Hospital District, the Improvement Act District of Surbiton, the Uxbridge Joint Hospital District, the Local Government District of Watford, and the Borough of Wigan.
	Birmingham Order (1) 1882 Provisional Order for altering and amending certain Confirming Acts. (Note: Local Government Board's Provisional Orders Confirmation (Bethesda, &c.) Act 1880 (43 & 44 Vict. c. clxxviii)) (Note: Local Government Board's Provisional Order Confirmation (Birmingham) Act 1881 (44 & 45 Vict. c. lxviii))	
	Birmingham Order (2) 1882 Provisional Order for altering the Birmingham Improvement Act, 1851. (Note: Birmingham Improvement Act 1851 (14 & 15 Vict. c. xciii))	
	Gainsborough Order 1882 Provisional Order for altering Confirming Acts. (Note: First Public Health Supplemental Act 1852 (15 & 16 Vict. c. 42)) (Note: Local Government Supplemental Act 1867 (30 & 31 Vict. c. 21)) (Note: Local Government Act 1868 (No. 6) (31 & 32 Vict. c. cliii))	
	Smethwick Order 1882 Provisional Order for altering the Smethwick Local Board (Gas) Act, 1876. (Note: Smethwick Local Board (Gas) Act 1876 (39 & 40 Vict. c. clxxi))	
	South Blyth Order 1882 Provisional Order for extending the Local Government District of South Blyth and for other purposes.	
	Stafford Order 1882 Provisional Order for altering the Stafford Corporation Act, 1876. (Note: Stafford Corporation Act 1876 (39 & 40 Vict. c. cxcvi))	
	Staines Joint Hospital Order 1882 Provisional Order for forming a United District under Sect. 279 of the Public Health Act, 1875. (Note: Public Health Act 1875 (38 & 39 Vict. c. 55))	
	Surbiton Order 1882 Provisional Order for partially repealing and altering the Surbiton Improvement Act 1855. (Note: Surbiton Improvement Act 1855 (18 & 19 Vict. c. xxxvi))	
	Uxbridge Joint Hospital Order 1882 Provisional Order for forming a United District under Sect. 279 of the Public Health Act, 1875.	
	Watford Order 1882 Provisional Order for extending the Local Government District of Watford.	
	Wigan Order 1882 Provisional Order for altering and amending certain Local Acts. (Note: Wigan Gas Act 1861 (24 & 25 Vict. c. clxx)) (Note: Wigan Improvement Act 1874 (37 & 38 Vict. c. cxxiv)) (Note: Wigan Improvement Act 1880 (43 & 44 Vict. c. cxxvii))	
Local Government Board's Provisional Orders Confirmation (No. 4) Act 1882	45 & 46 Vict. c. lxii	3 July 1882
An Act to confirm certain Provisional Orders of the Local Government Board relating to the Rural Sanitary District of the Billericay Union, the City and County of Bristol, the Local Government District of Compton Gifford, the Rural Sanitary District of the Farnham Union, the Local Government Districts of Hendon and Madron, the Borough of Nottingham, the Local Government Districts of Rusholme and Torquay, the Borough of Walsall, the Improvement Act District of West Bromwich, and the Local Government District of Worthing.
	Billericay Union Order 1882 Provisional Order to enable the Sanitary Authority for the Rural Sanitary District of the Billericay Union to put in force the Compulsory Clauses of the Lands Clauses Consolidation Acts, 1845, 1860, and 1869.	
	Bristol Order (2) 1882 Provisional Order to enable the Urban Sanitary Authority for the City and County of Bristol to put in force the Compulsory Clauses of the Lands Clauses Consolidation Acts, 1845, 1860, and 1869.	
	Compton Gifford Order 1882 Provisional Order to enable the Sanitary Authority for the Urban Sanitary District of Compton Gifford to put in force the Compulsory Clauses of the Lands Clauses Consolidation Acts, 1845, 1860, and 1869.	
	Farnham Union Order 1882 Provisional Order to enable the Sanitary Authority for the Rural Sanitary District of the Farnham Union to put in force the Compulsory Clauses of the Lands Clauses Consolidation Acts, 1845, 1860, and 1869.	
	Hendon Order 1882 Provisional Order to enable the.Sanitary Authority for the Urban Sanitary District of Hendon to put in force the Compulsory Clauses of the Lands Clauses Consolidation Acts, 1845, 1860, and 1869.	
	Madron Order 1882 Provisional Order to enable the Sanitary Authority for the Urban Sanitary District of Madron to put in force the Compulsory Clauses of the Lands Clauses Consolidation Acts, 1845, 1860, and 1869.	
	Nottingham Order 1882 Provisional Order to enable the Urban Sanitary Authority for the Borough of Nottingham to put in force the Compulsory Clauses of the Lands Clauses Consolidation Acts, 1845, 1860, and 1869.	
	Rusholme Order 1882 Provisional Order to enable the Sanitary Authority for the Urban Sanitary District of Rusholme to put in force the Compulsory Clauses of the Lands Clauses Consolidation Acts, 1845, 1860, and 1869.	
	Torquay Order 1882 Provisional Order for altering and amending a Confirming Act. (Note: Public Health Supplemental Act 1850 (No. 3) (13 & 14 Vict. c. 108))	
	Walsall Corporation (Loans) Order 1882 Provisional Order for partially repealing and altering a Local Act. (Note: Walsall Gas Purchase and Borough Extension Act 1876 (39 & 40 Vict. c. cxix))	
	West Bromwich Order 1882 Provisional Order for partially repealing and altering certain Local Acts. (Note: West Bromwich Improvement Act 1854 (17 & 18 Vict. c. clxiii)) (Note: West Bromwich Improvement Amendment Act 1865 (28 & 29 Vict. c. clx)) (Note: West Bromwich Improvement (Gas) Act 1876 (39 & 40 Vict. c. cxlix))	
	Worthing Order 1882 Provisional Order for partially repealing and amending certain Local Acts (Note: Worthing Improvement Act 1821 (1 & 2 Geo. 4. c. lix)) (Note: Worthing and Lancing Turnpike Road and Sea Defences Act 1826 (7 Geo. 4. c. x)) and a confirming Act.	
Local Government Board's Provisional Orders Confirmation (No. 6) Act 1882	45 & 46 Vict. c. lxiii	3 July 1882
An Act to confirm certain Provisional Orders of the Local Government Board relating to the Borough of Ashton-under-Lyne, the Improvement Act District of Bethesda, the Local Government District of Heckmondwike, the Borough of Lewes, the Improvement Act District of Lytham, the Local Government District of Pemberton, the Borough of Rochdale, and the Local Government District of Sowerby Bridge.
	Ashton-under-Lyne Order 1882 Provisional Order for partially repealing, altering, and amending certain Local Acts. (Note: Ashton-under-Lyne, Stalybridge and Dukinfield (District) Waterworks Act 1870 (33 & 34 Vict. c. cxxxi)) (Note: Ashton-under-Lyne, Stalybridge and Dukinfield (District) Waterworks Act 1875 (38 & 39 Vict. c. lxvii)) (Note: Ashton-under-Lyne Improvement Act 1877 (40 & 41 Vict. c. clxxi))	
	Bethesda Order 1882 Provisional Order for partially repealing, altering, and amending the Bethesda Improvement Act, 1854, (Note: Bethesda Improvement Act 1854 (17 & 18 Vict. c. cxi)) and for altering a Confirming Act.	
	Heckmondwike Order 1882 Provisional Order for partially repealing and amending certain Local Acts. (Note: Dewsbury, Batley and Heckmondwike Waterworks Act 1856 (19 & 20 Vict. c. xxxvi)) (Note: Dewsbury, Batley and Heckmondwike Waterworks Amendment Act 1861 (24 & 25 Vict. c. xxxiii)) (Note: Dewsbury, Batley and Heckmondwike Waterworks Amendment Act 1867 (30 & 31 Vict. c. lxii)) (Note: Batley Corporation Waterworks Act 1871 (34 & 35 Vict. c. xl))	
	Lewes Order 1882 Provisional Order under Section 304 of the Public Health Act, 1875.	
	Lytham Order 1882 Provisional Order amending a Local Act, (Note: Lytham Improvement Act 1847 (10 & 11 Vict. c. ccli)) and a Confirming Act. (Note: Local Government Board's Provisional Orders Confirmation (Belper Union, &c.) Act 1878 (41 & 42 Vict. c. cix))	
	Pemberton Order 1882 Provisional Order for altering and amending certain Local Acts. (Note: Pemberton Local Board Water Act 1875 (38 & 39 Vict. c. xlii)) (Note: Pemberton Local Board Water Act 1879 (42 & 43 Vict. c. xxvi))	
	Rochdale Order 1882 Provisional Order for partially repealing, altering, and amending certain Local Acts (Note: Rochdale Improvement Act 1853 (16 & 17 Vict. c. ccxx)) (Note: Rochdale Waterworks Act 1866 (29 & 30 Vict. c. clii)) (Note: Rochdale Improvement Act 1872 (35 & 36 Vict. c. cxlix)) (Note: Rochdale Improvement Act 1875 (38 & 39 Vict. c. xciv)) and Confirming Acts.	
	Sowerby Bridge Order 1882 Provisional Order for partially repealing, altering, and amending the Sowerby Bridge Local Board Act, 1863. (Note: Sowerby Bridge Local Board Act 1863 (26 & 27 Vict. c. lii))	
Local Government Board's Provisional Orders Confirmation (No. 7) Act 1882	45 & 46 Vict. c. lxiv	3 July 1882
An Act to confirm certain Provisional Orders of the Local Government Board relating to the Local Government Districts of Ealing, Edmonton, and Crompton, the Ports of Newcastle, North Shields, and South Shields, the Port of Plymouth, and the Local Government Districts of West Cowes and Woodford.
	Ealing Order 1882 Provisional Order ta enable the Sanitary Authority for the Urban Sanitary District of Ealing to put in force the Compulsory Clauses of the Lands Clauses Consolidation Acts, 1845, 1860, and 1869.	
	Edmonton Order 1882 Provisional Order to enable the Sanitary Authority for the Urban Sanitary District of Edmonton to put in force the Compulsory Clauses of the Lands Clauses Consolidation Acts, 1845, 1860, and 1869.	
	Crompton Order 1882 Provisional Order to enable the Sanitary Authority for the Urban Sanitary District of Crompton to put in force the Compulsory Clauses of the Lands Clauses Consolidation Acts 1845, 1860, and 1869.	
	River Tyne (Port) Order 1882 Provisional Order for permanently constituting a Port Sanitary Authority, and for other purposes.	
	Plymouth Order 1882 Provisional Order for permanently constituting a Port Sanitary Authority, and for other purposes.	
	West Cowes Order 1882 Provisional Order for extending the Local Government District of West Cowes.	
	Woodford Order 1882 Provisional Order to enable the Sanitary Authority for the Urban Sanitary District of Woodford to put in force the Compulsory Clauses of the Lands Clauses Consolidation Acts, 1845, 1860, and 1869.	
Local Government Board (Ireland) Provisional Orders Confirmation (Ballina and Lurgan) Act 1882	45 & 46 Vict. c. lxv	3 July 1882
An Act to confirm Provisional Orders of the Local Government Board for Ireland relating to the towns of Ballina and Lurgan.
	Ballina Waterworks Provisional Order 1882 Ballina Waterworks. Provisional Order.	
	Lurgan Town Provisional Order 1882 Town of Lurgan. Provisional Order.	
Local Government Board (Ireland) (Dublin, &c.) Provisional Orders Confirmation Act 1882	45 & 46 Vict. c. lxvi	3 July 1882
An Act to confirm certain Provisional Orders of the Local Government Board for Ireland relating to the City of Dublin and the Poor Law Union of Ballymoney.
	City of Dublin (New Street) Provisional Order 1882 City of Dublin (New Street). Provisional Order.	
	Ballymoney Waterworks Provisional Order 1882 Ballymoney Waterworks. Provisional Order.	
Land Drainage Supplemental Act 1882 (repealed)	45 & 46 Vict. c. lxvii	3 July 1882
An Act to confirm a Provisional Order under the Land Drainage Act, 1861, (Note: Land Drainage Act 1861 (24 & 25 Vict. c. 133)) relating to Fenstanton Improvements, situate in the parish of Fenstanton, in the county of Huntingdon. (Repealed by Statute Law (Repeals) Act 1993 (c. 50))
	In the matter of Fenstanton Improvements, situate in the parish of Fenstanton, in the county of Huntingdon.	
Artillery Ranges Act 1882	45 & 46 Vict. c. lxviii	3 July 1882
An Act to extend the Artillery Ranges Act, 1862. (Note: Artillery Ranges Act 1862 (25 & 26 Vict. c. 36))
Local Government Board's Provisional Order Confirmation (No. 10) Act 1882	45 & 46 Vict. c. lxix	3 July 1882
An Act to confirm a Provisional Order of the Local Government Board relating to the Borough of Ryde.
	Ryde Order 1882 Provisional Order for altering and amending a Confirming Act. (Note: Local Government Board's Provisional Orders Confirmation (Bristol, &c.) Act 1876 (39 & 40 Vict. c. xcvii))	
Tramways Orders Confirmation (No. 2) Act 1882	45 & 46 Vict. c. lxx	3 July 1882
An Act to confirm certain Provisional Orders made by the Board of Trade under the Tramways Act, 1870, (Note: Tramways Act 1870 (33 & 34 Vict. c. 78)) relating to Great Yarmouth Tramways, Highgate Hill Tramways, Isle of Axholme and Marshland Tramways, North Shields and District Tramways Extension, Pontypridd and Rhondda Valley Tramways, Staffordshire Tramways (Extension), Sunderland Tramways (Extension), and Weston-super-Mare Tramways.
	Great Yarmouth Tramways Order 1882 Order authorising the construction of Tramways in the Borough of Great Yarmouth in the county of Norfolk.	
	Highgate Hill Tramways Order 1882 Order authorising the construction of Tramways along Highgate Hill, in the county of Middlesex.	
	Isle of Axholme and Marshland Tramways Order 1882 Order authorising the construction of Tramways in the Parts of Lindsey, in the county of Lincoln.	
	North Shields and District Tramways (Extension) Order 1882 Order authorising the construction of additional Street Tramways in the parish of Tynemouth in the county of Northumberland, and amending the Tynemouth and District Tramways Order, 1879.	
	Pontypridd and Rhondda Valley Tramways Order 1882 Order authorising the Construction of Tramways in the respective Parishes of Llanwonno, Llantrisant and Ystradyfodwg, all in the County of Glamorgan.	
	Staffordshire Tramways (Extension) Order 1882 Order authorising the construction of Tramways in the Parishes of Darlaston, Wednesbury, and Walsall, all in the county of Stafford, and amending the Staffordshire Tramways Order, 1879.	
	Sunderland Tramways (Extension) Order 1882 Order authorising the construction of Tramways in the Borough of Sunderland, in the County of Durham.	
	Weston-super-Mare Tramways Order 1882 Order authorising the construction of Tramways in the parish of Weston-super-Mare, in the county of Somerset.	
Local Government Board (Ireland) Provisional Orders Confirmation (Banbridge, &c.) Act 1882	45 & 46 Vict. c. lxxi	3 July 1882
An Act to confirm certain Provisional Orders of the Local Government Board for Ireland relating to Banbridge, Ennis, Lame, and Londonderry.
	Banbridge Burial Ground Provisional Order 1882 Banbridge Burial Ground United District. Provisional Order.	
	Drumcliffe Burial Ground Provisional Order 1882 Drumcliffe Burial Ground. Provisional Order.	
	Larne Waterworks Provisional Order 1882 Larne Waterworks. Provisional Order.	
	Londonderry Waterworks Provisional Order 1882 Londonderry Waterworks. Provisional Order.	
Edinburgh Roads Act 1882	45 & 46 Vict. c. lxxii	3 July 1882
An Act to confirm a Provisional Order of one of Her Majesty's Principal Secretaries of State for providing that the Roads and Bridges (Scotland) Act, 1878, (Note: Roads and Bridges (Scotland) Act 1878 (41 & 42 Vict. c. 51)) shall come into force in the county of Edinburgh on the 1st day of September 1882 subject to certain conditions.
North British Railway Act 1882	45 & 46 Vict. c. lxxiii	3 July 1882
An Act for shortening and improving the Railway Route from the authorised Forth Bridge Railway at Inverkeithing to the Edinburgh Perth and Dundee Railway near the Bridge of Earn Station; to transfer to the North British Railway Company the powers of the Forth Bridge Railway Company for making a Railway to Burntisland; to authorise an abandonment of part of that Railway and of another Railway and an extension of time for the compulsory purchase of land and completion of works; and for other purposes.
Northampton Waterworks Act 1882 (repealed)	45 & 46 Vict. c. lxxiv	3 July 1882
An Act to extend the Powers of the Northampton Waterworks Company. (Repealed by Northampton Act 1988 (c. xxix) (Note: Incorrectly cited as "Northampton 1988 (c.lxxiv)" in the Chronological Table of Local Acts.))
Scottish Widows' Fund and Life Assurance Society's Act 1882 (repealed)	45 & 46 Vict. c. lxxv	3 July 1882
An Act to consolidate and amend the Constitution and Articles and Regulations of the Scottish Widows' Fund and Life Assurance Society; to confer further powers on that Society; and for other purposes. (Repealed by Scottish Widows' Fund and Life Assurance Society's Act 1926 (16 & 17 Geo. 5. c. lxxviii))
Belfast and Northern Counties Railway Act 1882	45 & 46 Vict. c. lxxvi	3 July 1882
An Act to authorise the Belfast and Northern Counties Railway Company to construct railways in substitution for portions of those authorised by the Belfast and Northern Counties Railway Act 1881; (Note: Belfast and Northern Counties Railway Act 1881 (44 & 45 Vict. c. ccxvii)) to abandon so much of the railways authorised by that Act as will be rendered unnecessary by reason of the construction of the substituted railways; to raise further capital; and for other purposes.
Carrickfergus Harbour Junction Railway Act 1882	45 & 46 Vict. c. lxxvii	3 July 1882
An Act for making a railway to connect the Belfast and Northern Counties Railway with the Harbour of Carrickfergus; and for other purposes.
Newhaven Harbour Amendment Act 1882	45 & 46 Vict. c. lxxviii	3 July 1882
An Act to amend the Newhaven Harbour Improvement Act 1878. (Note: Newhaven Harbour Improvement Act 1878 (41 & 42 Vict. c. lxxi))
Lough Swilly Railway (Further Powers) Act 1882	45 & 46 Vict. c. lxxix	3 July 1882
An Act to enable the Londonderry and Lough Swilly Railway Company to raise additional capital to confer further powers upon them in reference to their undertaking and for other purposes.
Bristol Corporation of the Poor Act 1882 (repealed)	45 & 46 Vict. c. lxxx	3 July 1882
An Act to amend the law with respect to the rates to be levied within the ancient limits of the City of Bristol and the liberties thereof; and for other purposes. (Repealed by Bristol Corporation Act 1897 (60 & 61 Vict. c. ccxxx))
Stroud Water Act 1882	45 & 46 Vict. c. lxxxi	3 July 1882
An Act for incorporating the Stroud Water Company and for conferring powers on that Company and for other purposes.
Glasgow Court Houses Amendment Act 1882	45 & 46 Vict. c. lxxxii	3 July 1882
An Act to amend the Acts relating to the Court Houses in the City of Glasgow.
Northwich Gas Act 1882	45 & 46 Vict. c. lxxxiii	3 July 1882
An Act for incorporating and conferring powers on the Northwich Gas Company.
Lecky and Smyth's Patent Act 1882	45 & 46 Vict. c. lxxxiv	3 July 1882
An Act for reviving and rendering valid certain Letters Patent, granted to Francis Boyce Lecky and William Hugh Smyth, for improvements in the manufacture of soles, and in the machinery or apparatus employed therefor.
West Lancashire Railway Act 1882	45 & 46 Vict. c. lxxxv	3 July 1882
An Act to extend the time for the completion of the railway authorised by the West Lancashire Railway Act 1871 (Note: West Lancashire Railway Act 1871 (34 & 35 Vict. c. cc)) and for other purposes.
Rugby Gas Act 1882	45 & 46 Vict. c. lxxxvi	3 July 1882
An Act to re-incorporate with further powers the Rugby Gaslight and Coke Company Limited.
Glasgow Corporation Waterworks Amendment Act 1882	45 & 46 Vict. c. lxxxvii	3 July 1882
An Act to authorise the Commissioners of the Glasgow Corporation Waterworks to construct an additional Service Reservoir and other Works; and for other purposes.
London and North-western Railway (Ordsall Lane) Act 1882	45 & 46 Vict. c. lxxxviii	3 July 1882
An Act for empowering the London and North-western Railway Company to construct a new Railway at Ordsall Lane in Manchester and for other purposes.
Brighton District Tramways Act 1882	45 & 46 Vict. c. lxxxix	3 July 1882
An Act to authorise the construction of Street Tramways between Shoreham and Hove in the county of Sussex; and for other purposes.
East and West India Dock Company's Extension Act 1882 (repealed)	45 & 46 Vict. c. xc	3 July 1882
An Act to authorise the East and West India Dock Company to extend their Dock system by constructing and maintaining a new Dock and other Works in connexion therewith in the parishes of Grays Thurrock, Little Thurrock, and Chadwell, all in the County of Essex. (Repealed by Port of London (Consolidation) Act 1920 (10 & 11 Geo. 5. c. clxxiii))
Edinburgh Street Tramways Act 1882 (repealed)	45 & 46 Vict. c. xci	3 July 1882
An Act to enable the Edinburgh Street Tramways Company to make and maintain additional Tramways and to confer other powers upon the said Company. (Repealed by Edinburgh Corporation Order Confirmation Act 1932 (22 & 23 Geo. 5. c. vii))
Liverpool Tramways Act 1882 (repealed)	45 & 46 Vict. c. xcii	3 July 1882
An Act to authorise the Liverpool United Tramways and Omnibus Company to construct new Tramways and to confer further powers on them with reference to other Tramways in the neighbourhood of Liverpool; and for other purposes. (Repealed by Liverpool Corporation Act 1921 (11 & 12 Geo. 5. c. lxxiv))
London Brighton and South Coast Railway (Various Powers) Act 1882	45 & 46 Vict. c. xciii	3 July 1882
An Act to confer further Powers on the London Brighton and South Coast Railway Company and for other purposes.
Metropolitan Railway Act 1882	45 & 46 Vict. c. xciv	3 July 1882
An Act to authorise the Metropolitan Railway Company to purchase certain Lands in the Parishes of Hammersmith and Kensington to make further Provision with reference to the completion of the Inner Circle Railway to vest outstanding Shares in the Metropolitan and Saint Johns Wood Company in the Company to raise additional capital and for other purposes.
Liverpool United Gaslight Company's Act 1882	45 & 46 Vict. c. xcv	3 July 1882
An Act to enable the Liverpool United Gaslight Company to purchase additional land and to erect gasworks thereon; to raise further money; and for other purposes.
Exmouth Gas Act 1882	45 & 46 Vict. c. xcvi	3 July 1882
An Act for conferring additional powers upon the Exmouth Gas Company; and for other purposes.
Local Government Board's Provisional Order Confirmation (No. 8) Act 1882	45 & 46 Vict. c. xcvii	12 July 1882
An Act to confirm a Provisional Order of the Local Government Board relating to the Borough of Salford.
	Salford Order 1882 Provisional Order for altering certain Local Acts. (Note: Salford Improvement Act 1862 (25 & 26 Vict. c. ccv)) (Note: Salford Improvement Act 1867 (30 & 31 Vict. c. lviii)) (Note: Salford Improvement Act 1870 (33 & 34 Vict. c. cxxix)) (Note: Salford Tramways and Improvement Act 1875 (38 & 39 Vict. c. ci))	
Local Government Board's Provisional Order Confirmation (No. 11) Act 1882 (repealed)	45 & 46 Vict. c. xcviii	12 July 1882
An Act to confirm a Provisional Order of the Local Government Board relating to the Local Government District of Workington. (Repealed by Cumbria Act 1982 (c. xv))
	Workington Order 1882 Provisional Order for extending the Local Government District of Workington, and for altering and extending the provisions of a Local Act, (Note: Workington Improvement Act 1840 (3 & 4 Vict. c. xlv)) and for other purposes.	
Gas Orders Confirmation Act 1882	45 & 46 Vict. c. xcix	12 July 1882
An Act to confirm certain Provisional Orders made by the Board of Trade under the Gas and Water Works Facilities Act, 1870, (Note: Gas and Water Works Facilities Act 1870 (33 & 34 Vict. c. 70)) relating to Brecon Gas, High Wycombe Gas, Kettering Gas, Portsea Gas, Redditch Gas, Salisbury Gas, and Sheffield Gas.
	Brecon Gas Order 1882 Order empowering the Brecon Gas Company to raise Additional Capital.	
	High Wycombe Gas Order 1882 Order empowering the High Wycombe Gaslight and Coke Company, Limited, to maintain and continue Gasworks, and to make and supply Gas, in the borough and parish of High Wycombe and parish of West Wycombe, in the county of Buckingham.	
	Kettering Gas Order 1882 Order empowering the Kettering Gas Company (Limited) to maintain and continue Gasworks, and to make and supply Gas in the parish of Kettering, in the county of Northampton.	
	Portsea Gas Order 1882 Order empowering the Portsea Island Gaslight Company to extend their limits of supply to the parishes of Porchester, Wymering, Widley, and Farlington, in the county of Southampton, to construct and maintain Additional Works at Cosham, in the parish of Widley aforesaid, and to increase their Capital.	
	Redditch Gas Order 1882 Order empowering the Redditch Town and District Gas Company (Limited) to raise additional capital and amending the Redditch Gas Order, 1873.	
	Salisbury Gas Order 1882 Order empowering the Salisbury Gas Light and Coke Company to raise additional Capital.	
	Sheffield Gas Order 1882 Order empowering the Sheffield United Gaslight Company to acquire additional Lands, and to construct new Works.	
Water Orders Confirmation Act 1882	45 & 46 Vict. c. c	12 July 1882
An Act to confirm certain Provisional Orders made by the Board of Trade under the Gas and Water Works Facilities Act, 1870, relating to Caine Water, Cromer Water, Denbigh Water, and Kenilworth Water.
	Calne Water Order 1882 Order authorising the construction and maintenance of Waterworks and the supply of Water in the Town and Parish of Calne, and in the scveral Parishes of Blackland and Calstone Wellington, in the County of Wilts.	
	Cromer Water Order 1882 Order authorising the maintenance and continuance of Waterworks and the supply of Water to the Parishes of Cromer, Overstrand, Northrepps, and Runton, all in the county of Norfolk.	
	Denbigh Water Order 1882 Order empowering the Denbigh Water Company to raise additional Capital.	
	Kenilworth Water Order 1882 Order authorising the Construction of Waterworks and the Supply of Water in the Town and Parish of Kenilworth, in the County of Warwick.	
Tramways Orders Confirmation (No. 3) Act 1882	45 & 46 Vict. c. ci	12 July 1882
An Act to confirm certain Provisional Orders made by the Board of Trade under the Tramways Act, 1870, relating to Birmingham and Aston Tramways, Birmingham and Suburban Tramways, Birmingham and Western Districts Tramways, Manchester, Bury, and Rochdale Tramways (Extensions), and Walsall and District Tramways.
	Birmingham and Aston Tramways Order 1882 Order authorising the Birmingham and Aston Tramways Company, Limited, to construct additional Street Tramways in the parish of Birmingham, in the county of Warwick, and amending the Birmingham and Aston Tramways Order, 1880.	
	Birmingham and Suburban Tramways Order 1882 Order authorising the Construction of Tramways in the Parishes of Birmingham, Aston, Handsworth, Yardley, and King's Norton, in the Counties of Warwick, Worcester, and Stafford.	
	Birmingham and Western Districts Tramways Order 1882 Order authorising the construction of Tramways in the Parishes or Places of Balsall Heath, Moseley, King's Norton, Rowley Regis, Tipton, and Coseley, in the Counties of Worcester and Stafford.	
	Manchester, Bury and Rochdale Tramways (Extensions) Order 1882 Order authorising the construction of Tramways in the boroughs of Bury, Rochdale, and Heywood, the local board districts of Royton, Castleton, Wuerdle and Wardle, Littleborough, Whitworth, Bacup, and Rawtenstall, and the townships of Tottington-Lower-End, in the parish of Bury, and Newchurch, in the parish of Whalley, all in the county of Lancaster, and amending the Bury and District Tramways Order, 1881, and the Rochdale Tramways Order, 1881.	
	Walsall and District Tramways Order 1882 Order authorising the Construction of Extension Tramways in the Borough of Walsall and Parish of Wednesbury, in the County of Stafford, and amending the Walsall and District Tramways Order, 1880.	
Education Department Provisional Order Confirmation (West Ham, &c.) Act 1882	45 & 46 Vict. c. cii	12 July 1882
An Act to confirm certain Provisional Orders made by the Education Department under the Elementary Education Act, 1870, (Note: Elementary Education Act 1870 (33 & 34 Vict. c. 75)) to enable the School Boards for West Ham (Essex) and Terrington St. John (Norfolk) to put in force the Lands Clauses Consolidation Act, 1845, and the Acts amending the same.
	West Ham Order 1882 Provisional Order for putting in force the Lands Clauses Consolidation Act, 1845.	
	Terrington St. John Order 1882 Provisional Order for putting in force the Lands Clauses Consolidation Act, 1845.	
Local Government Board's Provisional Orders Confirmation (No. 9) Act 1882	45 & 46 Vict. c. ciii	12 July 1882
An Act to confirm certain Provisional Orders of the Local Government Board relating to the Improvement Act Districts of Fleetwood and Rhyl and the City of York.
	Fleetwood Order 1882 Provisional Order for altering a Local Act. (Note: Fleetwood Improvement Act 1842 (5 & 6 Vict. c. xlix)	
	Rhyl Order 1882 Provisional Order for partially repealing and altering certain Local Acts. (Note: Rhyl Improvement Act 1852 (15 & 16 Vict. c. xxxii)) (Note: Rhyl Improvement Act 1872 (35 & 36 Vict. c. civ))	
	City of York Order 1882 Provisional Order for altering and amending certain Local Acts. (Note: York Improvement and Markets Act 1833 (3 & 4 Will. 4. c. lxii)) (Note: York Drainage and Sanitary Improvement Act 1853 (16 & 17 Vict. c. lvi))	
Metropolitan Markets (Fish, &c.) Act 1882	45 & 46 Vict. c. civ	12 July 1882
An Act for empowering the Mayor and Commonalty and Citizens of the City of London to convert their authorised London Central Fruit Vegetable and Flower Market into an Inland Fish Market and to continue Farringdon Market and for other purposes.
Tottenham and Edmonton Gas Act 1882	45 & 46 Vict. c. cv	12 July 1882
An Act to enable the Tottenham and Edmonton Gas Light and Coke Company to acquire lands for purposes of their undertaking to raise Additional Capital and for other purposes.
Milford Docks (Further Powers) Act 1882 (repealed)	45 & 46 Vict. c. cvi	12 July 1882
An Act for conferring powers on the Milford Docks Company for raising additional capital and to extend the time for completion of their Undertaking and for other purposes. (Repealed by Milford Docks Act 1953 (1 & 2 Eliz. 2. c. x))
Newquay and District Water Act 1882	45 & 46 Vict. c. cvii	12 July 1882
An Act for incorporating the Newquay and District Water Company and for conferring powers on that Company and for other purposes.
Seacombe, Hoylake, and Dee Side Railway Act 1882	45 & 46 Vict. c. cviii	12 July 1882
An Act to authorise the Seacombe Hoylake and Dee Side Railway Company to extend their Railway to New Brighton and for other purposes.
Padiham Local Board Act 1882 (repealed)	45 & 46 Vict. c. cix	12 July 1882
An Act to empower the Local Board for the District of Padiham and Hapton in the County of Lancaster to construct and maintain additional Waterworks and for other purposes. (Repealed by County of Lancashire Act 1984 (c. xxi))
Northampton Street Tramways Extension Act 1882 (repealed)	45 & 46 Vict. c. cx	12 July 1882
An Act to authorise the Northampton Street Tramways Company to construct additional Tramways; to abandon parts of their authorised Tramways; and for other purposes. (Repealed by Northampton Act 1988 (c. xxix))
Liskeard and Caradon Railway Act 1882	45 & 46 Vict. c. cxi	12 July 1882
An Act to authorise the Liskeard and Caradon Railway Company to make certain Railways and Works for the improvement and extension of their existing Railway and for other purposes.
Carnarvon (Morfa Seiont Common) Act 1882	45 & 46 Vict. c. cxii	12 July 1882
An Act for empowering the Mayor Aldermen and Burgesses of the Borough of Carnarvon to acquire Morfa Seiont Common in the Borough and to lay out a public park and for other purposes.
Greenwich and Millwall Subway Act 1882	45 & 46 Vict. c. cxiii	12 July 1882
An Act to revive and extend the powers of the Greenwich and Millwall Subway Company.
Forth Bridge Railway Act 1882	45 & 46 Vict. c. cxiv	12 July 1882
An Act to enable the Forth Bridge Railway Company to construct a substituted Railway across the Firth of Forth to amend the Acts relating to the Company and for other purposes.
Hull Extension and Improvement Act 1882	45 & 46 Vict. c. cxv	12 July 1882
An Act for extending the boundaries of the borough of Kingston-upon-Hull for consolidating and amending various provisions of the Local Acts in force within the borough and for other purposes.
Manchester, Sheffield, and Lincolnshire Railway and Cheshire Lines Act 1882	45 & 46 Vict. c. cxvi	12 July 1882
An Act for conferring additional powers on the Manchester Sheffield and Lincolnshire Railway Company and on the Cheshire Lines Committee and for other purposes.
Oswaldtwistle Local Board Act 1882 (repealed)	45 & 46 Vict. c. cxvii	12 July 1882
An Act to confirm an arrangement for the settlement of disputed claims between the Local Board for the district of Oswaldtwistle and certain persons with respect to moneys paid to and fraudulently appropriated by a former Clerk to the Board and to provide for carrying such arrangement into effect. (Repealed by County of Lancashire Act 1984 (c. xxi))
Accrington Corporation Tramways Act 1882 (repealed)	45 & 46 Vict. c. cxviii	12 July 1882
An Act to empower the Mayor Aldermen and Burgesses of the Borough of Accrington to make Tramways in and near the borough and for other purposes. (Repealed by County of Lancashire Act 1984 (c. xxi))
Westgate and Birchington Gas Act 1882	45 & 46 Vict. c. cxix	12 July 1882
An Act for conferring further powers on the Westgate and Birchington Gas Company for the purchase of land the construction of works the raising of money and otherwise in relation to their undertaking.
Coventry and District Tramways Act 1882 (repealed)	45 & 46 Vict. c. cxx	12 July 1882
An Act for empowering the Coventry and District Tramways Company to construct an additional Tramway in the city of Coventry and to deviate in constructing a part of their authorised Tramways to extend the time for constructing their undertaking; and for other purposes. (Repealed by West Midlands County Council Act 1980 (c. xi))
Cheadle Railway (Abandonment) Act 1882 (repealed)	45 & 46 Vict. c. cxxi	12 July 1882
An Act for the abandonment of the Cheadle Railway. (Repealed by Statute Law (Repeals) Act 2013 (c. 2))
Rothwell Gas Act 1882	45 & 46 Vict. c. cxxii	12 July 1882
An Act for incorporating and conferring powers on the Rothwell Gaslight Company.
Bury and Tottington District Railway Act 1882	45 & 46 Vict. c. cxxiii	12 July 1882
An Act to authorise the Bury and Tottington District Railway Company to raise additional Capital.
Highland Railway Act 1882	45 & 46 Vict. c. cxxiv	12 July 1882
An Act to authorise the Highland Railway Company to construct a railway from Keith to Buckie; and for other purposes.
Maidstone and Ashford Railway Act 1882	45 & 46 Vict. c. cxxv	12 July 1882
An Act to confer further powers on the Maidstone and Ashford Railway Company; and for other purposes.
Great North of Scotland (Buckie Extension) Railway Act 1882	45 & 46 Vict. c. cxxvi	12 July 1882
An Act to authorise the construction of a Railway from the Great North of Scotland Railway at Portsoy to Elgin; and for other purposes.
Oxford Gas Act 1882	45 & 46 Vict. c. cxxvii	12 July 1882
An Act for the granting of further powers to the Oxford Gaslight and Coke Company.
Swansea Tramways Act 1882 (repealed)	45 & 46 Vict. c. cxxviii	12 July 1882
An Act to confer further powers upon the Swansea Improvements and Tramways Company with respect to their Tramway Undertaking; and for other purposes. (Repealed by Swansea and District Transport Act 1936 (26 Geo. 5 & 1 Edw. 8. c. xxxix))
London and North-western Railway Act 1882	45 & 46 Vict. c. cxxix	12 July 1882
An Act for conferring further powers upon the London and North-western Railway Company in connexion with their own undertaking and upon that Company and the Lancashire and Yorkshire Railway Company and the Great Western Railway Company in respect of other undertakings in which they are jointly interested; and for other purposes.
Midland Railway (Additional Powers) Act 1882	45 & 46 Vict. c. cxxx	12 July 1882
An Act for conferring additional powers upon the Midland Railway Company for the construction of railways and other works and the acquisition of lands; for vesting in the Company the undertaking of the Evesham and Redditch Railway Company; for raising further Capital; and for other purposes.
South Staffordshire Mines Drainage Act 1882	45 & 46 Vict. c. cxxxi	12 July 1882
An Act to vary and amend the provisions of the South Staffordshire Mines Drainage Acts 1873 (Note: South Staffordshire Mines Drainage Act 1873 (36 & 37 Vict. c. cl)) and 1878. (Note: South Staffordshire Mines Drainage Act 1878 (41 & 42 Vict. c. lxxxi))
Cranbrook and Paddock Wood Railway Act 1882	45 & 46 Vict. c. cxxxii	12 July 1882
An Act to authorise the Cranbrook and Paddock Wood Railway Company to extend their Railway to Hawkhurst in the county of Kent; to raise further Money; and for other purposes.
Whitehaven Harbour and Dock Act 1882	45 & 46 Vict. c. cxxxiii	12 July 1882
An Act to enable the Trustees of the Port Harbour and Town of Whitehaven to raise a further sum of money for the purposes of their harbour and dock.
Edinburgh Street Tramways (Mechanical Power) Act 1882 (repealed)	45 & 46 Vict. c. cxxxiv	12 July 1882
An Act to enable the Edinburgh Street Tramways Company to use steam or other mechanical power on their tramways and to confer other powers upon the said Company. (Repealed by Edinburgh Corporation Order Confirmation Act 1932 (c.vii))
Taff Vale Railway Act 1882	45 & 46 Vict. c. cxxxv	12 July 1882
An Act to confer further powers on the Taff Yale Railway Company with reference to the construction of new and authorised railways the acquisition of lands and the raising of capital and for other purposes.
North Metropolitan Tramways Act 1882	45 & 46 Vict. c. cxxxvi	12 July 1882
An Act for empowering the North Metropolitan Tramways Company to extend their tramways along the Green Lanes and for other purposes.
Queenstown Waterworks Act 1882	45 & 46 Vict. c. cxxxvii	12 July 1882
An Act for incorporating and conferring powers on the Queenstown Waterworks Company.
Tramways Orders Confirmation (No. 1) Act 1882	45 & 46 Vict. c. cxxxviii	24 July 1882
An Act to confirm certain Provisional Orders made by the Board of Trade under the Tramways Act, 1870, relating to Aldershot and Farnborough Tramways Amendment, Birkdale and Southport Tramways (Use of Mechanical Power), Bristol Tramways (Extensions), Burnley and District Tramways Extension, Leamington and Warwick Tramways, Manchester Carriage and Tramways Company, North Staffordshire Tramways, and Oldham Borough Tramways (Extensions).
	Aldershot and Farnborough Tramways (Amendment) Order 1882 Order amending the Aldershot and Farnborough Tramways Order, 1878.	
	Birkdale and Southport Tramways (Mechanical Power) Order 1882 Order authorising the use of steam power or any mechanical power on the tramways of the Birkdale and Southport Tramways Company (Limited).	
	Bristol Tramways (Extensions) Order 1882 Order authorising the Bristol Tramways Company (Limited) to construct additional Tramways in the city and county of Bristol.	
	Burnley and District Tramways Extension Order 1882 Order authorising the construction of an Extension Tramway between Manchester Road Nelson and Barrowford Bridge, in Lancashire, and amending the Burnley and District Tramways Order, 1879.	
	Leamington and Warwick Tramways (Amendment) Order 1882 Order amending the Leamington and Warwick Tramways Order, 1879.	
	Manchester Carriage and Tramways Company's Order 1882 Order authorising the Manchester Carriage and Tramways Company to construct Tramways in Denton.	
	North Staffordshire Tramways Order 1882 Order authorising use of Steam or any Mechanical Power on certain portions of the authorised Tramways of the North Staffordshire Tramways Company, Limited.	
	Oldham Borough Tramways (Extensions) Order 1882 Order authorising the Mayor, Aldermen, and Burgesses of the Borough of Oldham, in the County Palatine of Lancaster, to construct certain Tramways in the said Borough.	
Education Department Provisional Orders Confirmation (Finchley, &c.) Act 1882	45 & 46 Vict. c. cxxxix	24 July 1882
An Act to confirm certain Provisional Orders made by the Education Department under the Elementary Education Act, 1870, to enable the School Boards for Finchley, Llanarth, and Upper Dylais to put in force the Lands Clauses Consolidation Act, 1845, and the Acts amending the same.
	Finchley Order 1882 The School Board for Finchley, County of Middlesex. Provisional Order for putting in force the Lands Clauses Consolidation Act, 1845.	
	Llanarth Order 1882 The School Board for Llanarth, U.D., County of Cardigan. Provisional Order for putting in force the Lands Clauses Consolidation Act, 1845.	
	Upper Dylais Order 1882 The School Board for Upper Dylais, County of Glamorgan. Provisional Order for putting in force the Lands Clauses Consolidation Act, 1845.	
Local Government Board (Ireland) Provisional Order Confirmation (Queenstown Waterworks) Act 1882	45 & 46 Vict. c. cxl	24 July 1882
An Act to confirm a Provisional Order of the Local Government Board for Ireland relating to Waterworks in the town of Queenstown.
	Queenstown Waterworks Provisional Order 1882 Queenstown Waterworks. Provisional Order.	
Education Department Provisional Order Confirmation (London) Act 1882	45 & 46 Vict. c. cxli	24 July 1882
An Act to confirm a Provisional Order made by the Education Department under the Elementary Education Act, 1870, to enable the School Board for London to put in force the Lands Clauses Consolidation Act, 1845, and the Acts amending the same.
	London Order 1882 The School Board for London. Provisional Order for putting in force the Lands Clauses Consolidation Act, 1845.	
Londonderry Port and Harbour Act 1882	45 & 46 Vict. c. cxlii	24 July 1882
An Act for empowering the Londonderry Port and Harbour Commissioners to construct quays and other works; for conferring further powers on those Commissioners, and for other purposes.
London Tilbury and Southend Railway Act 1882	45 & 46 Vict. c. cxliii	24 July 1882
An Act to enable the London Tilbury and Southend Railway Company to construct additional railways and for other purposes.
South London (Elephant and Castle) Market Act 1882 (repealed)	45 & 46 Vict. c. cxliv	24 July 1882
An Act for the Establishment and Regulation of a Market in South London (near the Elephant and Castle Tavern) in the parish of Saint Mary Newington in the county of Surrey and for other purposes. (Repealed by Statute Law (Repeals) Act 2013 (c. 2))
Gateshead and District Tramways Act 1882	45 & 46 Vict. c. cxlv	24 July 1882
An Act for authorising the Gateshead and District Tramways Company to abandon the construction of a portion of their authorised Undertaking and to reduce their Capital for extending the Time for constructing the remainder of their Undertaking; and for other purposes.
London Riverside Fish-market Act 1882 (repealed)	45 & 46 Vict. c. cxlvi	24 July 1882
An Act for the establishment and regulation of a Fish Market in the parish of St. Paul Shadwell and borough of Tower Hamlets in the county of Middlesex and the formation of a New Street and the widening and improvement of existing streets and landing stairs near to the market and for other purposes. (Repealed by Statute Law (Repeals) Act 2013 (c. 2))
Edinburgh Suburban and Southside Junction Railway Act 1882	45 & 46 Vict. c. cxlvii	24 July 1882
An Act to authorise the Edinburgh Suburban and Southside Junction Railway Company to construct new Railways and to abandon part of their authorised Railways and for other purposes.
Great Western Railway (No. 2) Act 1882	45 & 46 Vict. c. cxlviii	24 July 1882
An Act for conferring upon the Great Western Railway Company further powers for the construction of New Railways and other works and the taking of lands in the county of Glamorgan; for vesting in the Company the Undertaking of the Torbay and Brixham Railway Company; and for other purposes.
Saint Helens (Corporation) Water Act 1882	45 & 46 Vict. c. cxlix	24 July 1882
An Act to empower the Mayor, Aldermen, and Burgesses of the town of Saint Helens in the county of Lancaster to make and maintain additional Waterworks and to borrow Money and for other purposes.
Driffield Water Act 1882	45 & 46 Vict. c. cl	24 July 1882
An Act for better supplying with Water Great Driffield and the adjoining district in the East Riding of the county of York.
Ascot District Gas Act 1882	45 & 46 Vict. c. cli	24 July 1882
An Act for incorporating the Ascot District Gas Company and for other purposes.
City of Glasgow Bank (Liquidation) Act 1882	45 & 46 Vict. c. clii	24 July 1882
An Act to facilitate the winding-up of the City of Glasgow Bank, to transfer from the Liquidators to a Company the remaining Assets of the Bank; and for other purposes.
Gravesend Railway Act 1882	45 & 46 Vict. c. cliii	24 July 1882
An Act to authorise the Gravesend Railway Company to extend their Railway in Gravesend to make a Pier or Wharf in connexion therewith and for other purposes.
Greenock Burgh Extension Act 1882 (repealed)	45 & 46 Vict. c. cliv	24 July 1882
An Act for extending the boundaries of the burgh of Greenock; to increase the number of the Town Council; to alter the constitution of the Board of Police of Greenock, and to confer further powers on that Board with respect to their Gas undertaking; to make further provisions with respect to the Harbour Trust of Greenock, and the Water Trust of Greenock, and the Municipal Government of the Burgh; and for other purposes. (Repealed by Greenock Corporation Act 1909 (9 Edw. 7. c. cxxix))
Lydd Railway (Extensions) Act 1882	45 & 46 Vict. c. clv	24 July 1882
An Act to authorise the Lydd Railway Company to extend their railway to Headcorn and New Romney in the county of Kent to raise further money; and for other purposes.
Norwood District Tramways Act 1882	45 & 46 Vict. c. clvi	24 July 1882
An Act to authorise the construction of the Norwood District Tramways in the county of Surrey; and for other purposes.
Metropolitan and District Railways (City Lines and Extensions) Act 1882	45 & 46 Vict. c. clvii	24 July 1882
An Act to extend the time for purchasing lands and completing the Metropolitan and District Railways (City Lines and Extensions) and for other purposes.
Maryport Improvement (Harbour) Act 1882 (repealed)	45 & 46 Vict. c. clviii	24 July 1882
An Act to enable the Trustees for the district and harbour of Maryport to raise a further sum of money for the purposes of their works for the improvement of the harbour of Maryport. (Repealed by Maryport Harbour Revision Order 2007 (SI 2007/3463))
Plymouth, Devonport, and District Tramways Act 1882 (repealed)	45 & 46 Vict. c. clix	24 July 1882
An Act for making tramways in the county of Devon to be called "the Plymouth Devonport and District Tramways" and for other purposes. (Repealed by Plymouth City Council Act 1987 (c. iv) (Note: Incorrectly cited as "Plymouth City Council 1987 (c.clix)" in the Chronological Table of Local Acts.))
Kingsbridge and Salcombe Railway Act 1882	45 & 46 Vict. c. clx	24 July 1882
An Act for authorising the construction of a railway from the Brent Station of the Great Western Railway Company to Kingsbridge and Salcombe; and for other purposes.
Edinburgh Municipal and Police Extension Act 1882 (repealed)	45 & 46 Vict. c. clxi	24 July 1882
An Act for extending the municipal and police boundaries of the city of Edinburgh, including the royal burgh thereof, and for amendment of the Edinburgh Municipal and Police Act, 1879, (Note: Edinburgh Municipal and Police Act 1879 (42 & 43 Vict. c. cxxxii)) and application thereof to the districts annexed, and for other purposes. (Repealed by Edinburgh Corporation Order Confirmation Act 1933 (24 & 25 Geo. 5. c. v))
Lancashire and Yorkshire Railway Act 1882	45 & 46 Vict. c. clxii	24 July 1882
An Act for conferring further powers on the Lancashire and Yorkshire Railway Company with relation to their own undertaking and undertakings in which they are jointly interested and for other purposes.
London Street Tramways (Extensions) Act 1882	45 & 46 Vict. c. clxiii	24 July 1882
An Act to authorise the London Street Tramways Company to construct additional tramways and for other purposes.
Southampton Harbour Act 1882	45 & 46 Vict. c. clxiv	24 July 1882
An Act for conferring further powers on the Southampton Harbour Board with reference to the construction of works the levying of rates and tolls and the raising of money and for other purposes.
Todmorden Waterworks Act 1882	45 & 46 Vict. c. clxv	24 July 1882
An Act for incorporating the Todmorden Waterworks Company and for conferring powers on that Company; and for other purposes.
Great Eastern Railway Act 1882	45 & 46 Vict. c. clxvi	24 July 1882
An Act to authorise the Great Eastern Railway Company to construct additional Railways in the counties of Middlesex Hertford and Cambridge; to improve parts of their existing Railways and of the March and Spalding Railway; to construct Tramways at Wisbech and to execute other works and to confer upon them other powers in relation to their undertaking; to authorise a diversion of the Hertford Branch Railway; and for other purposes,
Belfast Presbyterian College Act 1882 (repealed)	45 & 46 Vict. c. clxvii	24 July 1882
An Act for incorporating the Trustees of the Belfast Presbyterian College and authorising them to take conveyances and transfers of the said College and other property and for providing for the management of the same by the said Trustees subject to the control of the General Assembly of the Presbyterian Church in Ireland and for other purposes. (Repealed by Union Theological College of the Presbyterian Church in Ireland Act 1978 (c. v))
Pier and Harbour Orders Confirmation (No. 1) Act 1882	45 & 46 Vict. c. clxviii	10 August 1882
An Act to confirm certain Provisional Orders made by the Board of Trade under the General Pier and Harbour Act, 1861, relating to Bridlington, Broadstairs, Camlough, Holywood, Johnshaven, Kettletoft, Penmaenmawr, Plymouth, Seabrook, Southend, Stonehaven, Weymouth, and Worthing (West).
	Bridlington Promenade Pier Order 1882 Order for the construction, maintenance, and regulation of a pier at Bridlington, in the East Riding of the county of York.	
	Broadstairs Pier Order 1882 Order for the improvement and regulation of Broadstairs Pier and the construction of new works.	
	Carnlough Pier and Harbour Order 1882 Order for amending the Carnlough Pier and Harbour Order, 1875.	
	Holywood Pier and Quay Order 1882 Order for the Maintenance and Regulation of the Pier and Works at Holywood, in the county of Down.	
	Johnshaven Harbour Order 1882 Order for the further improvement and regulation of the Harbour of Johnshaven, in the county of Kincardinе.	
	Kettletoft Pier Order 1882 Order for the enlargement, maintenance and regulation of the Pier at Kettletoft, in the Island of Sanday.	
	Penmaenmawr Pier Order 1882 Order for the construction, maintenance, and regulation of a Pier at Penmaenmawr, in the county of Carnarvon.	
	Plymouth Pier Order 1882 Order for the amendment of the Plymouth Pier Order, 1878.	
	Seabrook Pier Order 1882 Order for the Construction, Maintenance, and Regulation of a Pier or Jetty, in the parish of Newington, in the borough of Hythe, in the county of Kent.	
	Southend Piers Order 1882 Order for reviving and amending the Southend Piers Order, 1878.	
	Stonehaven Harbour Order 1882 Order for amending the Act (Note: Stonehaven Harbour Act 1825 (6 Geo. 4. c. liv)) relating to the Harbour of Stonehaven, in the county of Kincardine, and for conferring further powers on the Harbour Commissioners.	
	Weymouth Pier Order 1882 Order for the extension of Pier and other works at Weymouth in the County of Dorset.	
	West Worthing Pier Order 1882 Order for the construction, maintenance, and regulation of a Pier at West Worthing, in the county of Sussex.	
Local Government Board's (Gas) Provisional Order Confirmation Act 1882	45 & 46 Vict. c. clxix	10 August 1882
Ah Act to confirm a Provisional Order of the Local Government Board under the provisions of the Gas and Water Works Facilities Act, 1870, and the Public Health Act, 1875, relating to the Local Government District of Upper Sedgley.
	Upper Sedgley (Gas) Order 1882 Provisional Order under the Gas and Water Works Facilities Act, 1870.	
Local Government Board's Provisional Orders Confirmation (No. 5) Act 1882	45 & 46 Vict. c. clxx	10 August 1882
An Act to confirm certain Provisional Orders of the Local Government Board relating to the Borough of Bury (two), the Godalming Main Sewerage District, and the Local Government Districts of Marsden and Northwich.
	Bury Order (1) 1882 Provisional Order to enable the Urban Sanitary Authority for the Borough of Bury to put in force the Compulsory Clauses of the Lands Clauses Consolidation Acts, 1845, 1860, and 1869.	
	Bury Order (2) 1882 Provisional Order for partially repealing, altering, and amending certain Local Acts. (Note: Bury Improvement Act 1846 (9 & 10 Vict. c. ccxciii)) (Note: Bury Gas Act 1866 (29 & 30 Vict. c. xlii)) (Note: Bury Improvement Act 1872 (35 & 36 Vict. c. cxlvi))	
	Godalming Order 1882 Provisional Order for forming a United District under Sect. 279 of the Public Health Act, 1875.	
	Marsden Order 1882 Provisional Order for extending a Local Government District, and for other purposes.	
	Northwich Order 1882 Provisional Order to enable the Sanitary Authority for the Urban Sanitary District of Northwich, to put in force the Compulsory Clauses of the Lands Clauses Consolidation Acts, 1845, 1860, and 1869.	
Belfast Harbour Act 1882	45 & 46 Vict. c. clxxi	10 August 1882
An Act to authorise the Construction of Additional Docks and other Works at Belfast; to extend the Powers of the Belfast Harbour Commissioners; and for other purposes.
Newcastle-upon-Tyne Improvement Act 1882	45 & 46 Vict. c. clxxii	10 August 1882
An Act to enable the Mayor Aldermen and Citizens of the City of Newcastle-upon-Tyne to construct New Streets Roads and Street and Road Improvements Tramways and other Works and to make further provision for the good government of the City and for other purposes.
Accrington Improvement Act 1882	45 & 46 Vict. c. clxxiii	10 August 1882
An Act to confer further powers upon the Corporation of the Borough of Accrington for the Improvement of that Borough.
Sutton Bridge Dock Act 1882	45 & 46 Vict. c. clxxiv	10 August 1882
An Act for conferring further powers on the Sutton Bridge Dock Company in relation to their undertaking and for other purposes.
Bristol Waterworks Act 1882	45 & 46 Vict. c. clxxv	10 August 1882
An Act to enable the Bristol Waterworks Company to construct Additional Works and raise Additional Capital; and for other purposes.
Glamorganshire Canal Act 1882 (repealed)	45 & 46 Vict. c. clxxvi	10 August 1882
An Act to empower the Company of Proprietors of the Glamorganshire Canal Navigation to make and maintain a Railway and other Works at Cardiff and to raise further moneys and for other purposes. (Repealed by Mid Glamorgan County Council Act 1987 (c. vii))
Railway Working and Management Company Act 1882	45 & 46 Vict. c. clxxvii	10 August 1882
An Act to incorporate a company for the purpose of undertaking the working and management of railways; and for other purposes.
Waterford, Dungarvan and Lismore Railway Act 1882	45 & 46 Vict. c. clxxviii	10 August 1882
An Act to confer further powers on the Waterford, Dungarvan, and Lismore Railway Company, to make provision with reference to traffic on the Railway of that Company and on the Railway of the Great Western Railway Company; and for other purposes.
Lynn and Fakenham Railway Act 1882	45 & 46 Vict. c. clxxix	10 August 1882
An Act to authorise the Lynn and Fakenham Railway Company to construct railways and other works and for other purposes.
Tredegar Water and Gas Act 1882	45 & 46 Vict. c. clxxx	10 August 1882
An Act to authorise the Tredegar Water and Gas Company to sell and the Local Board for the District of Tredegar to purchase the undertaking of the Company.
East London Railway Act 1882	45 & 46 Vict. c. clxxxi	10 August 1882
An Act to empower the East London Railway Company to construct a new Railway and to abandon an authorised Railway and to lease their undertaking and for other purposes.
Moore Street Market and North Dublin City Improvement Act 1882	45 & 46 Vict. c. clxxxii	10 August 1882
An Act to incorporate a Company for the establishment regulation and maintenance of a general market and for making new streets and improvements in connexion therewith in the parishes of St. Thomas and St. Mary on the north side of the City of Dublin and for other purposes.
Alford and Sutton Tramways Act 1882	45 & 46 Vict. c. clxxxiii	10 August 1882
An Act for extending the time for the completion of the Alford and Sutton tramways.
Dundee Gas (Debenture Stock) Act 1882 (repealed)	45 & 46 Vict. c. clxxxiv	10 August 1882
An Act to authorise the Dundee Gas Commissioners to create and issue Debenture Stock; and for other purposes. (Repealed by Dundee Corporation (Consolidated Powers) Order Confirmation Act 1957 (6 & 7 Eliz. 2. c. iv))
Dundee Police and Improvement Consolidation Act 1882 (repealed)	45 & 46 Vict. c. clxxxv	10 August 1882
An Act to amend and consolidate the Dundee Police and other Acts; to enable the Dundee Police Commissioners to create and issue Debenture Stock; and for other purposes. (Repealed by Dundee Corporation (Consolidated Powers) Order Confirmation Act 1957 (6 & 7 Eliz. 2. c. iv))
Kilsyth and Bonnybridge Railway Act 1882	45 & 46 Vict. c. clxxxvi	10 August 1882
An Act for making a Railway from the Kelvin Valley Railway to the Denny Branch of the Caledonian Railway and for other purposes.
Plymouth and Dartmoor Railway Act 1882	45 & 46 Vict. c. clxxxvii	10 August 1882
An Act for conferring further powers on the Plymouth and Dartmoor Railway Company for the construction of works the raising of Money and otherwise in relation to their undertaking and for other purposes.
Solway Junction Railway Act 1882	45 & 46 Vict. c. clxxxviii	10 August 1882
An Act for conferring further powers on the Solway Junction Railway Company; and for other purposes.
South Kerry Waste Lands Consolidation Act 1882	45 & 46 Vict. c. clxxxix	10 August 1882
An Act for embanking and reclaiming certain Waste or Slob Lands in South Kerry in the County of Kerry.
Glasgow Corporation Gas Act 1882 (repealed)	45 & 46 Vict. c. cxc	10 August 1882
An Act to confer further powers on the Corporation of Glasgow in relation to their Gas undertaking by the construction of connecting Railways between their Dalmarnock Works and the Caledonian Railway; the construction of a new street; and for other purposes. (Repealed by Glasgow Gas Act 1910 (10 Edw. 7 & 1 Geo. 5. c. cxxxi))
Great Northern Railway Act 1882	45 & 46 Vict. c. cxci	10 August 1882
An Act to confer further powers upon the Great Northern Railway Company to enable them to acquire the undertaking of the Louth and Lincoln Railway Company and for other purposes.
South London Tramways Act 1882	45 & 46 Vict. c. cxcii	10 August 1882
An Act to authorise the South London Tramways Company to construct additional Tramways to confer further powers on that Company and for other purposes.
Ramsgate and Margate Tramways Act 1882	45 & 46 Vict. c. cxciii	10 August 1882
An Act for authorising the Ramsgate and Margate Tramways Company to abandon the construction of a portion of their authorised undertaking to extend the time for constructing the remainder of their Undertaking and for other purposes.
North London Tramways Act 1882	45 & 46 Vict. c. cxciv	10 August 1882
An Act for dissolving the North London Suburban Tramway Company Limited and re-incorporating them under the name of the North London Tramways Company and to confer upon them powers to construct and maintain additional Tramways and for other purposes.
Swindon, Marlborough and Andover Railway Act 1882	45 & 46 Vict. c. cxcv	10 August 1882
An Act for granting further powers to the Swindon Marlborough and Andover Railway Company, and for other purposes.
Guardians of the Poor of the Parish of Saint Pancras Act 1882	45 & 46 Vict. c. cxcvi	10 August 1882
An Act to enable the guardians of the poor of the parish of Saint Pancras Middlesex to acquire lands and hereditaments adjacent to their workhouse for the extension thereof; and for other purposes.
Didcot, Newbury and Southampton Junction Railway Act 1882	45 & 46 Vict. c. cxcvii	10 August 1882
An Act to confer further powers on the Didcot Newbury and Southampton Junction Railway Company; to enable them to extend their Railway to Southampton and Aldermaston; and for other purposes.
Oswestry and Llangynog Railway Act 1882 (repealed)	45 & 46 Vict. c. cxcviii	10 August 1882
An Act for making Railways in the Counties of Salop Denbigh and Montgomery to be called the Oswestry and Llangynog Railway and for other purposes. (Repealed by Oswestry and Llangynog Railway (Abandonment) Act 1889 (52 & 53 Vict. c. lxxxi))
Pontypridd, Caerphilly and Newport Railway Act 1882	45 & 46 Vict. c. cxcix	10 August 1882
An Act for conferring upon the Pontypridd Caerphilly and Newport Railway Company further powers in connexion with their own undertaking and the undertakings of the Rhymney and Brecon and Merthyr Tydfil Junction Railway Companies, and for other purposes.
Dartmouth Harbour Improvement Act 1882 (repealed)	45 & 46 Vict. c. cc	10 August 1882
An Act for the construction of a quay and other works within the Harbour of Dartmouth for amending the Dartmouth Harbour Orders 1863 and 1870 and for other purposes. (Repealed by Dartmouth Harbour Act 1951 (14 & 15 Geo. 6. c. xxxiii))
Rhondda and Swansea Bay Railway Act 1882	45 & 46 Vict. c. cci	10 August 1882
An Act for incorporating the Rhondda and Swansea Bay Railway Company and for other purposes.
Llangammarch and Neath and Brecon Junction Railway Act 1882 (repealed)	45 & 46 Vict. c. ccii	10 August 1882
An Act for making a Railway from the central Wales Extension Line of the London and North-western Railway Company at Llangammarch to the Neath and Brecon Railway at Devynock in the county of Brecon and for other purposes. (Repealed by Llangammarch and Neath and Brecon Junction Railway (Abandonment) Act 1890 (53 & 54 Vict. c. xxvi))
Manchester Corporation Act 1882	45 & 46 Vict. c. cciii	10 August 1882
An Act to enable the Mayor Aldermen and Citizens of the City of Manchester in the county of Lancaster to acquire and maintain an Art Gallery and for the regulation thereof to execute works for the purposes of their Waterworks to amend and extend the provisions of the Local Acts relating to the City of Manchester and for other purposes.
Mersey Docks and Harbour Board (Overhead Railways) Act 1882 (repealed)	45 & 46 Vict. c. cciv	10 August 1882
An Act to repeal "The Mersey Docks and Harbour Board (Overhead Railways) Act 1878" (Note: Mersey Docks and Harbour Board (Over-Head Railways) Act 1878 (41 & 42 Vict. c. cxcviii)) and to confer new and further powers upon the Board for the construction of overhead or high level Railways in connexion with their Docks on the Liverpool side of the River Mersey; and for other purposes relating to the Board and their Docks. (Repealed by Liverpool Overhead Railway Act 1956 (4 & 5 Eliz. 2. c. lxxxii))
West Metropolitan Tramways Act 1882	45 & 46 Vict. c. ccv	10 August 1882
An Act to incorporate the West Metropolitan Tramways Company, to empower them to construct new Tramways, and acquire existing Tramways, and for other purposes.
Severn Bridge and Forest of Dean Central Railway Act 1882 (repealed)	45 & 46 Vict. c. ccvi	10 August 1882
An Act to authorise an Extension of Time to the Severn Bridge and Forest of Dean Central Railway Company for completing their Undertaking. (Repealed by Statute Law (Repeals) Act 2013 (c. 2))
Limehouse Subway Act 1882	45 & 46 Vict. c. ccvii	10 August 1882
An Act to extend the time for the completion of the Limehouse Subway and for other purposes.
Workington Dock and Harbour Act 1882 (repealed)	45 & 46 Vict. c. ccviii	10 August 1882
An Act to empower the Trustees of the Will of the late William Earl of Lonsdale to construct a new Dock and other works in connexion with the existing Workington Harbour, and to raise money for that purpose, and to authorise a sale or transfer by the said Trustees of the Workington Harbour undertaking (being part of the estates settled by the will of the said Earl) and for other purposes. (Repealed by Workington Harbour and Dock (Transfer) Act 1957 (5 & 6 Eliz. 2. c. xxxii))
Stratford-upon-Avon, Towcester, and Midland Junction Railway Act 1882	45 & 46 Vict. c. ccix	10 August 1882
An Act to confer further powers on the Easton Neston Mineral and Towcester, Roade and Olney Junction Railway Company, to change the name of the Company, and for other purposes.
Busby Water Act 1882	45 & 46 Vict. c. ccx	10 August 1882
An Act to extend the Limits of Supply of the Busby Water Company; to authorise the Company to construct new works and raise additional Capital; and for other purposes.
South-western Railway Act 1882	45 & 46 Vict. c. ccxi	10 August 1882
An Act for authorising the London and South-western Railway Company to make new Railways and other works and to purchase additional lands, and for conferring other powers upon them in relation to their own and other undertakings; for the widening of the Somerset and Dorset Railway; for empowering the Company and the London Brighton and South Coast Railway Company to acquire additional lands; for the sale or lease of part of the Plymouth and Dartmoor Railway to the Company; for authorising agreements between the Company and other Corporations bodies and Companies; and for other purposes.
Northampton Corporation Act 1882 (repealed)	45 & 46 Vict. c. ccxii	10 August 1882
An Act to vest in the Corporation of the borough of Northampton the Race Ground or Freemen’s Commons; to extinguish the Freemen's rights of pasturage in certain other lands of the Corporation; to empower the Corporation to form public Parks, and to make New Street Improvements; and for other purposes. (Repealed by Northampton Act 1988 (c. xxix))
Peckham and East Dulwich Tramways Act 1882	45 & 46 Vict. c. ccxiii	10 August 1882
An Act for making Tramways in the parish of Camberwell in the county of Surrey and for other purposes.
Great Western Railway (No. 1) Act 1882	45 & 46 Vict. c. ccxiv	10 August 1882
An Act for conferring upon the Great Western Railway Company further powers in connexion with their own and other undertakings, and for conferring upon other Companies further powers in connexion with undertakings in which they are jointly interested with that Company; for reviving the Powers of constructing portions of the Coleford Railway and taking Lands for the same; for vesting in the Great Western Railway Company the Undertakings of the Swindon and Highworth Light Railway Company and the Berks and Hants Extension Railway Company; and for other purposes.
Whitland, Cronware, and Pendine Railway Act 1882 (repealed)	45 & 46 Vict. c. ccxv	10 August 1882
An Act for conferring further powers on the Whitland, Cronware, and Pendine Railway Company in relation to their undertaking, and for other purposes. (Repealed by Whitland, Cronware and Pendine Railway (Abandonment) Act 1892 (55 & 56 Vict. c. cxxvi))
Glasgow City and District Railway Act 1882	45 & 46 Vict. c. ccxvi	10 August 1882
An Act for making Railways from the Stobcross Branch of the North British Railway to the Glasgow and Coatbridge Branch and the Helensburgh Branch of that Railway, and for other purposes.
Nottingham Corporation Act 1882	45 & 46 Vict. c. ccxvii	10 August 1882
An Act to vest in the Corporation of Nottingham the Nottingham Freemen's Estate; to confer further powers on the Corporation relating to drainage, streets, and other matters of local government, and the borrowing of money; and for other purposes.
Rotherham and Bawtry Railway Act 1882 (repealed)	45 & 46 Vict. c. ccxviii	10 August 1882
An Act to empower the Rotherham and Bawtry Railway Company to make new Railways at Rotherham to abandon part of their authorised Railway and to raise further capital; and for other purposes. (Repealed by Rotherham and Bawtry Railway (Abandonment) Act 1888 (51 & 52 Vict. c. cc))
South-eastern Railway (Various Powers) Act 1882	45 & 46 Vict. c. ccxix	10 August 1882
An Act for conferring on the South-eastern Railway Company various powers with reference to their own undertakings and the undertakings of other Companies and for other purposes.
Tilbury and Gravesend Tunnel Junction Railway Act 1882 (repealed)	45 & 46 Vict. c. ccxx	10 August 1882
An Act for incorporating the Tilbury and Gravesend Tunnel Junction Railway Company; for authorising the construction of Railways; and for other purposes. (Repealed by Tilbury and Gravesend Tunnel Junction Railway (Abandonment) Act 1885 (48 & 49 Vict. c. xxi))
Wellesley Bridge (Limerick) Act 1882	45 & 46 Vict. c. ccxxi	18 August 1882
An Act to amend the Limerick Harbour (Composition of Debt) Act, 1867, (Note: Limerick Harbour (Composition of Debt) Act 1867 (30 & 31 Vict. c. 53)) in relation to Wellesley Bridge.
Metropolitan Street Improvements Act 1877 (Amendment) Act 1882 (repealed)	45 & 46 Vict. c. ccxxii	18 August 1882
An Act for amending the Metropolitan Street Improvements Act 1877. (Note: Metropolitan Street Improvements Act 1877 (40 & 41 Vict. c. ccxxxv)) (Repealed by Local Law (Greater London Council and Inner London Boroughs) Order 1965 (SI 1965/540))
Church Fenton, Cawood, and Wistow Railway Act 1882 (repealed)	45 & 46 Vict. c. ccxxiii	18 August 1882
An Act to enable the Church Fenton, Cawood, and Wistow Railway Company to construct a Railway to join the Hull, Barnsley and West Riding Junction Railway, and to extend the time for the completion of their authorised Railway; and for other purposes. (Repealed by Selby and Mid-Yorkshire Union Railway (Abandonment) Act 1890 (53 & 54 Vict. c. xii))
Chadderton Improvement Act 1882	45 & 46 Vict. c. ccxxiv	18 August 1882
An Act for conferring upon the Local Board for the District of Chadderton in the county of Lancaster powers for the acquisition of Lands and the construction of Works and for extending and defining the powers of the Local Board in relation to Streets Buildings and the Improvement and good Government of the district and for other purposes.
Ballymena and Portglenone Railway Act 1882 (repealed)	45 & 46 Vict. c. ccxxv	18 August 1882
An Act to alter and amend the Ballymena and Portglenone Railway Act, 1879. (Note: Ballymena and Portglenone Railway Act 1879 (42 & 43 Vict. c. ccx)) (Repealed by Ballymena and Portglenone Railway and Ballymena and Ahoghill Tramways (Abandonment) Act 1886 (49 & 50 Vict. c. xlvi))
Peckham, Lewisham and Catford Bridge Road Act 1882	45 & 46 Vict. c. ccxxvi	18 August 1882
An Act to authorise the construction of a new Road between Peckham in the county of Surrey and Lewisham in the county of Kent.
Eastern and Midlands Railway (Amalgamation) Act 1882	45 & 46 Vict. c. ccxxvii	18 August 1882
An Act to amalgamate the Lynn and Fakenham the Yarmouth and North Norfolk (Light) the Yarmouth Union the Midland and Eastern and the Peterborough Wisbeach and Sutton Railway Companies.
Devon and Cornwall Central Railway Act 1882	45 & 46 Vict. c. ccxxviii	18 August 1882
An Act for incorporating the Devon and Cornwall Central Railway Company and for other purposes.
Girvan and Portpatrick Junction Railway (Arrangement) Act 1882	45 & 46 Vict. c. ccxxix	18 August 1882
An Act to enable the Girvan and Portpatrick Junction Railway Company to raise further moneys, to arrange with their creditors, and to authorise in certain events the sale of the Undertaking.
East Warwickshire Waterworks Act 1882	45 & 46 Vict. c. ccxxx	18 August 1882
An Act for incorporating and conferring powers on the East Warwickshire Waterworks Company.
Ross District Water Act 1882 (repealed)	45 & 46 Vict. c. ccxxxi	18 August 1882
An Act for incorporating and conferring powers on the Ross District Water Company. (Repealed by Statute Law (Repeals) Act 1998 (c. 43))
Wrexham Mold and Connah's Quay Railway Act 1882	45 & 46 Vict. c. ccxxxii	18 August 1882
An Act to enable the Wrexham Mold and Connah's Quay Railway Company to make new Branch Railways Roads Streets and other Works to raise further Capital and for other purposes.
Essex County Loans Act 1882	45 & 46 Vict. c. ccxxxiii	18 August 1882
An Act to empower the Justices of the Peace for the county of Essex to consolidate the County Debt, and to create and issue County Stock.
Halifax Corporation Act 1882 (repealed)	45 & 46 Vict. c. ccxxxiv	18 August 1882
An Act to define and extend the Limits of Gas Supply of the Corporation of Halifax and to make further Provision for the Borrowing of Money by the Corporation and for other purposes. (Repealed by West Yorkshire Act 1980 (c. xiv))
Newcastle-upon-Tyne Corporation Loans Act 1882 (repealed)	45 & 46 Vict. c. ccxxxv	18 August 1882
An Act to make further provision respecting the borrowing of Money by the Corporation of Newcastle-upon-Tyne and for other purposes. (Repealed by Newcastle-upon-Tyne Corporation (General Powers) Act 1935 (25 & 26 Geo. 5. c. cxxiv))
Huddersfield Corporation Act 1882	45 & 46 Vict. c. ccxxxvi	18 August 1882
An Act to enable the Mayor Aldermen and Burgesses of the Borough of Huddersfield to construct Additional Tramways Street and Road Improve¬ ments Waterworks and other Works and to make further provision for the good Government of the Borough and for other purposes.
Rotherham Corporation Act 1882 (repealed)	45 & 46 Vict. c. ccxxxvii	18 August 1882
An Act to make further provision respecting the borrowing of Money by the Corporation of Rotherham to authorise the raising of further Sums the extension of time for construction of Dalton Reservoir and for other purposes. (Repealed by Statute Law (Repeals) Act 1989 (c. 43))
Swansea Corporation Loans Act 1882	45 & 46 Vict. c. ccxxxviii	18 August 1882
An Act for making further provisions respecting the issue and management of Swansea Corporation Stock and for altering the Swansea Corporation Loans Act, 1881 (Note: Swansea Corporation Loans Act 1881 (44 & 45 Vict. c. cvii)) so far as necessary for that purpose.
Tynemouth Corporation Loans Act 1882 (repealed)	45 & 46 Vict. c. ccxxxix	18 August 1882
An Act for making further provision respecting the Borrowing of Money by the Corporation of Tynemouth and for other purposes. (Repealed by Tyne and Wear Act 1980 (c.xliii))
Wolverhampton Corporation Loans Act 1882 (repealed)	45 & 46 Vict. c. ccxl	18 August 1882
An Act to make further provision respecting the borrowing of Money by the Corporation of Wolverhampton, and for other purposes. (Repealed by Wolverhampton Corporation Act 1969 (c. lx))
Ionian Bank Act 1882	45 & 46 Vict. c. ccxli	18 August 1882
An Act to extend the powers of the Ionian Bank, and for other purposes.
Bute Docks Act 1882	45 & 46 Vict. c. ccxlii	18 August 1882
An Act for conferring on the trustees and others claiming under the Will of the late Marquis of Bute power to extend their Docks and Railways at Cardiff and for other purposes.
Blackburn Improvement Act 1882	45 & 46 Vict. c. ccxliii	18 August 1882
An Act to consolidate and amend the Acts relating to the borough of Blackburn, and to make further provision for its local government and improvement; to authorise the construction of Tramways; and for other purposes.
Bolton Improvement Act 1882	45 & 46 Vict. c. ccxliv	18 August 1882
An Act to enable the Mayor Aldermen and Burgesses of the Borough of Bolton to make new streets and street improvements and to construct additional gasworks and waterworks to extend the limits of gas and water supply and to make further provision for the improvement and government of the borough and for other purposes.
Derby Corporation Act 1882 (repealed)	45 & 46 Vict. c. ccxlv	18 August 1882
An Act to enable the Corporation of Derby to acquire Little Chester Green to make a new Recreation Ground to vest the Arboretum in the Corporation and to maintain and regulate the same and Bass's Recreation Ground and Baths to make further provision respecting the borrowing of money by the Corporation and for other purposes. (Repealed by Derbyshire Act 1981 (c. xxxiv))
Hull, Barnsley, and West Riding Junction Railway and Dock (New Works) Act 1882	45 & 46 Vict. c. ccxlvi	18 August 1882
An Act to authorise the Hull Barnsley and West Riding Junction Railway and Dock Company to make and maintain new Railways and a new Dock and other works and to raise further money and for other purposes.
Latimer Road and Acton Railway Act 1882 (repealed)	45 & 46 Vict. c. ccxlvii	18 August 1882
An Act for making a Railway in the county of Middlesex to be called the Latimer Road and Acton Railway, and for other purposes. (Repealed by Latimer Road and Acton Railway Act 1900 (63 & 64 Vict. c. xcv))
London and South-western and Metropolitan District Railway Companies (Kingston and London Railway) Act 1882	45 & 46 Vict. c. ccxlviii	18 August 1882
An Act for the transfer of the Undertaking of the Kingston and London Railway Company to the London and South-western and Metropolitan District Railway Companies; for authorising deviations in the Kingston and London Railway; and for other purposes.
Macclesfield Corporation Act 1882	45 & 46 Vict. c. ccxlix	18 August 1882
An Act to make better provision for the Health, Local Government and Improvement of the Borough of Macclesfield, and to make further provision in relation to the existing and future loans of the Corporation, and for other purposes.
Wimbledon and West Metropolitan Junction Railway Act 1882	45 & 46 Vict. c. ccl	18 August 1882
An Act for making a Railway between Wimbledon and Putney in the county of Surrey.
Alexandra (Newport and South Wales) Docks and Railway Act 1882	45 & 46 Vict. c. ccli	18 August 1882
An Act for empowering the Alexandra (Newport and South Wales) Docks and Railway Company to make a New Dock and other Works in Extension of the Company’s Works in the Borough of Newport in the County of Monmouth and for other purposes.
Bawtry and Trent Railway and Dock Act 1882 (repealed)	45 & 46 Vict. c. cclii	18 August 1882
An Act for incorporating a Company for the construction of a Railway between Bawtry and Scrooby and West Stockwith and of a Dock at West Stockwith. (Repealed by Bawtry and Trent Railway and Dock (Abandonment) Act 1885 (48 & 49 Vict. c. cliii))
Bridgwater Railway Act 1882	45 & 46 Vict. c. ccliii	18 August 1882
An Act for incorporating the Bridgewater Railway Company and authorising them to make and maintain the Bridgewater Railway and for authorising arrangements between them and the London and South-western Railway Company and for other purposes.
North Cornwall Railway Act 1882	45 & 46 Vict. c. ccliv	18 August 1882
An Act for incorporating the North Cornwall Railway Company and authorising them to make and maintain the North Cornwall Railway and for authorising arrangements between them and the London and South-western Railway Company and for other purposes.
Charing Cross and Waterloo Electric Railway Act 1882 (repealed)	45 & 46 Vict. c. cclv	18 August 1882
An Act for making a Railway from Charing Cross to the Waterloo Station of the London and South-western Railway to be called the Charing Cross and Waterloo Electric Railway and for other purposes. (Repealed by Charing Cross and Waterloo Electric Railway (Abandonment) Act 1885 (48 & 49 Vict. c. lxxi))
Dover Harbour Act 1882 (repealed)	45 & 46 Vict. c. cclvi	18 August 1882
An Act for forming a Deep Water Harbour at Dover; and for other purposes. (Repealed by Dover Harbour Act 1891 (54 & 55 Vict. c. cxxv))
London Southern Tramways Act 1882	45 & 46 Vict. c. cclvii	18 August 1882
An Act for incorporating the London Southern Tramways Company and empowering them to construct Tramways in the parishes of Lambeth and Camberwell in the County of Surrey and for other purposes.
Mersey Railway Act 1882	45 & 46 Vict. c. cclviii	18 August 1882
An Act to authorise the Mersey Railway Company to divert a portion of their authorised line in Birkenhead, and to extend it to the central station in Liverpool, and for other purposes.
Metropolitan District Railway Act 1882	45 & 46 Vict. c. cclix	18 August 1882
An Act to confer further powers on the Metropolitan District Railway Company with respect to their own and to joint undertakings.
Rhymney Railway Act 1882	45 & 46 Vict. c. cclx	18 August 1882
An Act to authorise the Rhymney Railway Company to make new Railways in the parish of Merthyr Tydfil in the County of Glamorgan; and for other purposes.
Southport and Cheshire Lines Extension Railway Act 1882	45 & 46 Vict. c. cclxi	18 August 1882
An Act to authorise the Southport and Cheshire Lines Extension Railway Company to extend their Railway into the Borough of Southport to divert a portion of their authorised Railway and for other purposes.
Regent's Canal, City, and Docks Railway Act 1882	45 & 46 Vict. c. cclxii	18 August 1882
An Act for incorporating the Regent's Canal City and Docks Railway Company; for the transfer to them of the undertaking of the Regents Canal Company; for authorising the construction of Railways from the Great Western Railway at Paddington to the City and to the Royal Albert Dock of the London and Saint Katharine Docks Company; and of street improvements and other works; and for other purposes.
South-eastern Railway (New Lines and Widenings) Act 1882	45 & 46 Vict. c. cclxiii	18 August 1882
An Act for authorising the South-eastern Railway Company to make new lines and widen their existing lines in the City of London and in the Counties of Middlesex Surrey and Kent and for other purposes.
Metropolitan Outer Circle Railway Act 1882 (repealed)	45 & 46 Vict. c. cclxiv	18 August 1882
An Act for making Railways in the Counties of Middlesex and Essex, to be called "The Metropolitan Outer Circle Railway," and for other purposes. (Repealed by Metropolitan Outer Circle Railway (Abandonment) Act 1885 (48 & 49 Vict. c. clxiii))
Radstock Wrington and Congresbury Junction Railway Act 1882 (repealed)	45 & 46 Vict. c. cclxv	18 August 1882
An Act for making a Railway from near Radstock to Congresbury in the County of Somerset and for other purposes. (Repealed by Radstock, Wrington and Congresbury Junction Railway (Abandonment) Act 1886 (49 & 50 Vict. c. xxix))
Beaconsfield, Uxbridge, and Harrow Railway Act 1882 (repealed)	45 & 46 Vict. c. cclxvi	18 August 1882
An Act for making a Railway from Beaconsfield in the County of Buckingham to Harrow in the County of Middlesex and for other purposes. (Repealed by Beaconsfield, Uxbridge and Harrow Railway (Abandonment) Act 1886 (49 & 50 Vict. c. iii))

=== Private and personal acts ===
Short title	Citation	Royal assent
Long title
Cyfarthfa Works and Property Act 1882	45 & 46 Vict. c. 1 Pr.	28 July 1882
An Act for confirming certain arrangements made between the co-partnership of Crawshay Brothers and their landlords respecting the lease of Cyfarthfa works and property in the parish of Merthyr Tydfil in the county of Glamorgan; and for other purposes.
Corbett Estate Act 1882	45 & 46 Vict. c. 2 Pr.	10 August 1882
An Act to provide for the subsistence of the trust for accumulation contained in the will of Thomas George Corbett Esquire deceased an annual sum for maintenance of the person of full age entitled in immediate expectancy and to enable the grant of jointures by persons entitled in expectancy and for other purposes.
Earl of Aylesford's Estate Act 1882	45 & 46 Vict. c. 3 Pr.	10 August 1882
An Act to enable the Trustees of the Earl of Aylesford's Settled Estates to raise money for payment of his Debts, and for vesting in such Trustees his Life Interest in the Settled Estates and for other purposes.
The Maharajah Duleep Singh's Estate Act 1882	45 & 46 Vict. c. 4 Pr.	10 August 1882
An Act for carrying into effect an arrangement respecting the estates of His Highness the Maharajah Duleep Singh.
Stourhead Settled Estates Act 1882	45 & 46 Vict. c. 5 Pr.	18 August 1882
An Act to give to the Trustees of the will of Sir Richard Colt Hoare Baronet deceased power to sell property settled by the Testator.

=== Sources ===
- The Public General Statutes, Volume 18: 45 & 46 Victoria – 1882 – via Internet Archive.
- The Public General Acts: 45 & 46 Victoria – 1882 – via Internet Archive.

== See also ==
- List of acts of the Parliament of the United Kingdom
