= Sunderland District Electric Tramways =

Tramway operator in England

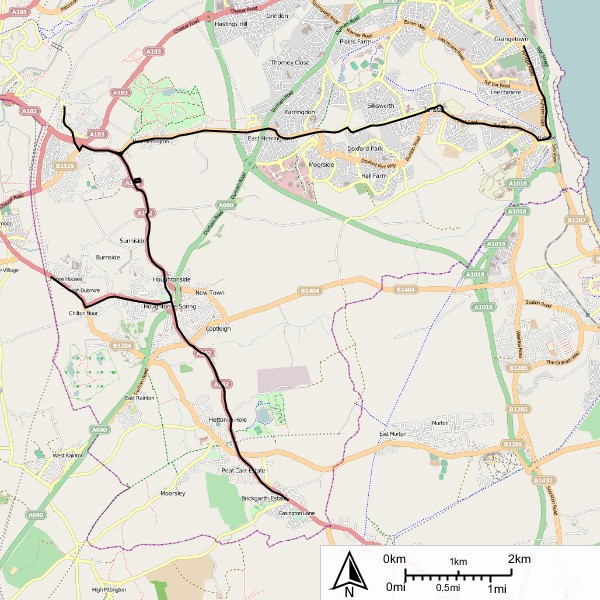
- Map of the route of the Sunderland District Electric Tramways

Operation
- Locale: Grangetown, Ryhope, Philadelphia, Hetton-le-Hole
- Open: 10 Jun 1905
- Close: 12 Jul 1925
- Status: Closed

Infrastructure
- Track gauge: 4 ft 8 1/2 in (1,435 mm) standard gauge
- Propulsion system: Electric
- Depot: Philadelphia

Statistics
- Route length: 14.28 miles (22.98 km)

The Sunderland District Electric Tramways operated an electric tramway service from Grangetown to Easington Lane between 1905 and 1925.

== History ==
The company was registered on 5 November 1903. Construction took nearly 18 months and the system was ready for opening on 10 June 1905. The main route of the tramway ran from Grangetown via Herrington to Easington Lane, with branches to Fencehouses and Penshaw.

The Newcastle upon Tyne Electricity Supply Company built a power plant at Philadelphia, behind the Lambton, Hetton & Joicey Collieries power station. The tram depot was located next to it and could house eighteen trams.

On 3 January 1921 through running started between the Sunderland Corporation Tramways system at Grangetown.

== Fleet ==
- 1-15 Brush Electrical Engineering Company 1905
- 16-30 Arbel (French company) 1905
- 31 Track sweeper/snow broom 1906
- 32-34 Brush Electrical Engineering Company 1908
- 34-38 Brush Electrical Engineering Company 1920

== Closure ==
The company disposed of some trams in 1924 to Bolton Corporation Tramways. The remaining trams were sold in 1925, sixteen to Grimsby Corporation Tramways and others to Manchester Corporation Tramways. The tramway system closed on 15 July 1925 and the company was renamed as the Sunderland District Omnibus Company, running a fleet of blue buses.
