= Bolton Corporation Tramways =

Tramway service in Bolton, England

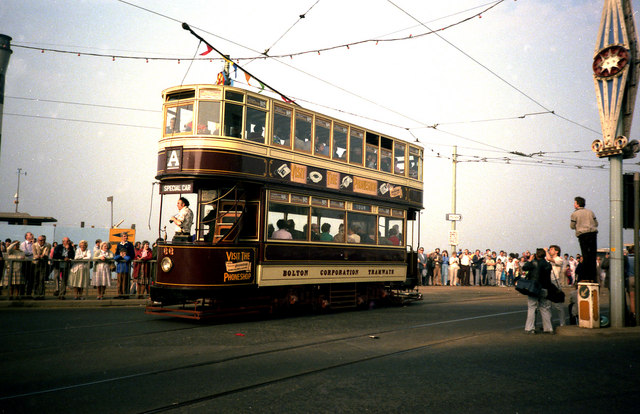
- Bolton car No 66 preserved on the Blackpool Tramway

Operation
- Locale: Bolton
- Open: June 1899
- Close: 29 March 1947
- Status: Closed

Infrastructure
- Track gauge: 1,435 mm (4 ft 8 1/2 in)
- Propulsion system: Electricity

Statistics
- Route length: 32.36 miles (52.08 km)

Bolton Corporation Tramways operated a tramway service in Bolton between 1899 and 1947.

At the peak of Britain’s first-generation tramways, it was possible to travel by tram all the way from Pier Head at Liverpool to the Pennines in Rochdale by tram.

== History ==
The corporation took over the Bolton Horse Tramways and the tramway assets of Edmund Holden and Company in June 1899, and undertook a programme of modernisation and electrification.

The first electric services ran on routes to Great Lever, Toothill Bridge and Tonge Moor 9 December 1899. On 2 January 1900 electric services started on routes to Halliwell, Dunscar, Moses Gate, Daubhill, Deane, Lostock and Doffcocker. The depot was located on Shifnall Street at SD 71993 08964.

Extensions took place as follows:

- 13 April 1900 - Moses Gate route was extended to Farnworth (Black Horse), the Lostock route to Horwich and the Deane route to Hulton Lane.
- 19 May 1900 - Lee Lane section in Horwich
- 21 December 1900 - Deane route extended to Chip Hill Road.
- 19 July 1904- Daubhill service extended to Four Lane Ends.
- 18 March 1905 - Toothill Bridge line extended to Breightmet
- 6 May 1910 - the Darcy Lever tramway
- 4 May 1911 - Brownlow Fold section
- 8 June 1923 - Chorley Old Road service extended from Doffcocker to Montserrat
- 26 October 1923 - Swan Lane extension.
- 11 April 1924 – Brownlow Fold route extension from Elgin Street to Church Road
- 19 December 1924 Deane service extended to Westhoughton.

The service to Leigh via Atherton was withdrawn in 1933.

== Fleet ==
- 1-40 Electric Railway and Tramway Carriage Works 1899
- 41-49 Electric Railway and Tramway Carriage Works 1900
- 50-59 Electric Railway and Tramway Carriage Works 1901
- 60-81 Electric Railway and Tramway Carriage Works 1902
- 82-86 Electric Railway and Tramway Carriage Works 1903
- 87-96 Brush Electrical Engineering Company 1906
- 97-103 Brush Electrical Engineering Company 1910
- 104-106 United Electric Car Company 1911
- 107-112 United Electric Car Company 1912
- 113-120 English Electric 1919
- 121-130 English Electric 1923
- 131-138 Brush Electrical Engineering Company 1906 (second hand from Sunderland Corporation Tramways)

== Closure ==
The final tram service operated on 29 March 1947. Car 66 survives and is preserved on the Blackpool Tramway.
