= Sunderland Tramways Company =

Tramway operator in England

Operation
- Locale: Sunderland, Tyne and Wear
- Open: 28 April 1879
- Close: 10 February 1901
- Status: Closed

Infrastructure
- Track gauge: 1,435 mm (4 ft 8 1/2 in)
- Propulsion system: Horse

Statistics
- Route length: 6.41 miles (10.32 km)

The Sunderland Tramways Company operated a tramway service in Sunderland, Tyne and Wear between 1879 and 1901.

== History ==
Horse-drawn tramway services started on 28 April 1879, running from Monkwearmouth to Roker. Additional lines south of the river were completed by June 1879. In 1880 an experiment was made with steam locomotives, but this came to nothing, and horse power remained until the company terminated services in 1901.

During the lifetime of the company, the tramcar fleet reached a maximum of 33 vehicles.

== Closure ==
The corporation purchased the company in 1900 for the sum of £35,000, and commenced a programme of modernisation and electrification. The tramway re-opened as Sunderland Corporation Tramways.
