= Sunderland Corporation Tramways =

Tramway operator in England

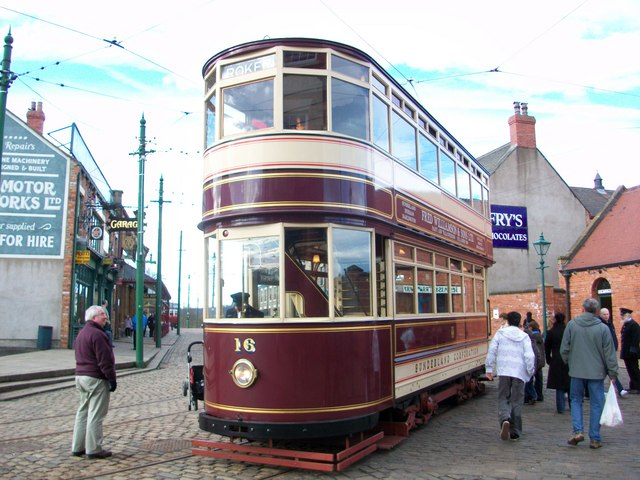
- Tram 16 at Beamish Museum

Operation
- Locale: Sunderland, Co. Durham
- Open: 30 March 1900
- Close: 1 October 1954
- Status: Closed
- Owner: Sunderland Corporation

Infrastructure
- Track gauge: 4 ft 8 1/2 in (1,435 mm) standard gauge
- Propulsion system: Electric

Statistics
- Route length: 12.24 miles (19.70 km)

Sunderland Corporation Tramways operated a tramway service in Sunderland (then part of County Durham) between 1900 and 1954.

== History ==
=== Beginning ===
In 1900 Sunderland Corporation bought the Sunderland Tramways Company which had operated a horse-drawn tramway in the town since 1879. Electrification of the service took place rapidly with the first converted service opening from Roker to Christ Church on 15 August 1900. The remaining services were upgraded by 1904.

=== First World War ===
During the First World War Sunderland, like many other local authorities, employed women on the tramcars as conductresses. There were ten employed by 1915, although on lower wages than their male counterparts – 6s to 10s per week, compared with 11s to 15s per week for the men. In April 1916, the town was attacked by a Zeppelin, and tram no. 10 was badly damaged, along with the tramway offices. By 1920 the conductresses had retired, as the men who had returned from the war returned to their previous employment.

=== Inter-war years ===
On 3 January 1921 the company started a joint service with the Sunderland District Electric Tramways to Houghton-le-Spring. On 2 December 1925 a new route was opened along Durham Road to Barnes Park, and then further extended four years later to Humbledon Hill. Twelve years later, the route along Fulwell Lane was extended on 10 May 1937 along Dykelands Road to Seaburn. In 1932 two tramcars were obtained from the Mansfield and District Light Railways.

=== Post-war period ===
In 1948 the Durham Road line was extended to Grindon Lane, and in 1949 on to Thorney Close Road. In the 1950s tram services began to close, beginning with the Villette Road route on 5 November 1950. On 1 October 1954 a final procession of trams left the town hall for Seaburn. By 1959 the last of the tram lines had been taken up. The system was closed on 1 October 1954.

=== Surviving trams ===
Car 16 was withdrawn in 1954 and spent some time at a football ground and then as farm accommodation. It was purchased for restoration in 1989 and was restored in 2003. It is operational at the Beamish Museum.

== Lines and depots ==
=== Lines ===
The Sunderland Corporation Tramways had a network of eight electric tram lines at its peak, connecting areas north and south of the River Wear. Three lines were north of the Wear, and five were south of it. The routes north and south of the river were linked by the Wearmouth Bridge.

The lines were:

- North of the Wear
  - Monkwearmouth to Southwick
  - To Fulwell then Seaburn
  - To Roker then Seaburn
- South of the Wear
  - along Bridge Street and Fawcett Street to Borough Road
  - from Borough Road to the south along Burdon Road to Grangetown
  - from Borough Road to the east, clockwise until joining the Grangetown line
  - from Borough Road to the east, clockwise until joining the Bridge Street line (this line was known as 'The Circle').
  - a branch off 'The Circle' at Southill Crescent, going south-west to Thorney Close Road

=== Depots ===
There were two depots. The main tramshed and offices were at the Wheatsheaf depot in Monkwearmouth. Workshops were located at the Hylton Road depot.

== General managers ==
- Harry England 1900 - 1903
- Archibald Dayson 1903 - 1928
- Charles Albert Hopkins 1929 - 1948
- Harry Snowball 1948 - 1952
- Norman Morton 1952 – 1954 (General Manager of Sunderland Corporation Transport until 1969)
