= Distress for Rates Act 1960 =

Act of the Parliament of the United Kingdom

Distress for Rates Act 1960 (Note: Section 16(1).)
- Act of Parliament
- Parliament of the United Kingdom
- Long title: An Act to consolidate, with corrections and improvements made under the Consolidation of Enactments (Procedure) Act 1949, (Note: 12, 13 & 14 Geo. 6. c. 33.) certain enactments relating to the recovery of rates.
- Citation: 8 & 9 Eliz. 2. c. 12
- Territorial extent: England and Wales (Note: Section 16(2).)

Dates
- Royal assent: 22 March 1960
- Commencement: 1 April 1960 (Note: Section 16(3).)
- Repealed: 1 April 1968
Other legislation
| Amends | See § Repealed enactments |
| Repeals/revokes | See § Repealed enactments |
| Repealed by | General Rate Act 1967 |

Status: Repealed

Text of statute as originally enacted

The Distress for Rates Act 1960 (8 & 9 Eliz. 2. c. 12) was an act of the Parliament of the United Kingdom that consolidated enactments relating to the recovery of rates in England and Wales.

== Provisions ==
=== Repealed enactments ===
Section 15(1) of the act repealed 17 enactments, listed in the second schedule to the act.

| Citation | Short title | Extent of repeal |
|---|---|---|
| 43 Eliz. 1. c. 2 | Poor Relief Act 1601 | Sections two and seven. |
| 17 Geo. 2. c. 38 | Poor Relief Act 1743 | Sections seven and eight. |
| 54 Geo. 3. c. 170 | Poor Relief Act 1814 | In section twelve the words "rate for the relief of the poor" and the words "or highway cess". |
| 2 & 3 Vict. c. 71 | Metropolitan Police Courts Act 1839 | Section fifty-one so far as it relates to rates within the meaning of this Act. |
| 11 & 12 Vict. c. clxiii | City of London Sewers Act 1848 | Sections one hundred and ninety-four and one hundred and ninety-six. |
| 12 & 13 Vict. c. 14 | Distress for Rates Act 1849 | The whole act. |
| 12 & 13 Vict. c. 64 | Poor Law (Justices Jurisdiction) Act 1849 | The whole act. |
| 13 & 14 Vict. c. 57 | Vestries Act 1850 | In section seven, except as it applies to church rates, the words from "To prepare and issue the necessary process" to "such arrears". |
| 15 & 16 Vict. c. 38 | Justices Jurisdiction Act 1852 | The whole act. |
| 25 & 26 Vict. c. 102 | Metropolis Management Amendment Act 1862 | Section eighteen. |
| 39 & 40 Vict. c. 61 | Divided Parishes and Poor Law Amendment Act 1876 | Sections thirty-one, forty-four and forty-five. |
| 15 & 16 Geo. 5. c. 90 | Rating and Valuation Act 1925 | Section fifty-nine so far as it relates to any document required or authorised to be sent or served under or for the purposes of this Act. |
| 25 & 26 Geo. 5. c. 46 | Money Payments (Justices Procedure) Act 1935 | Sections ten and eleven. In subsection (4) of section sixteen the words "(except subsection (2) of section eleven thereof)". |
| 11 & 12 Geo. 6. c. 26 | Local Government Act 1948 | Subsection (1) of section sixty-three so far as it relates to any document required or authorised to be sent or served under or for the purposes of this Act. |
| 15 & 16 Geo. 6 & 1 Eliz. 2. c. 55 | Magistrates' Courts Act 1952 | In section one hundred and two, subsection (2) so far as it applies to warrants of distress and warrants of commitment for rates within the meaning of this Act. |
| 15 & 16 Geo. 6 & 1 Eliz. 2. c. 55 | Magistrates' Courts Act 1952 | In section one hundred and twenty-eight, subsections (1) and (2) so far as they relate to proceedings for the recovery of rates within the meaning of this Act. |
| 15 & 16 Geo. 6 & 1 Eliz. 2. c. 55 | Magistrates' Courts Act 1952 | In the Fifth Schedule the amendment of the Money Payments (Justices Procedure) Act 1935. |
| 4 & 5 Eliz. 2. c. 9 | Rating and Valuation (Miscellaneous Provisions) Act 1955 | In section thirteen, subsections (1), (2) and (3) and in subsection (4) the words "on the coming into operation of an order under this section" and the words from "and in section one" to the end of the section. |
| 7 & 8 Eliz. 2. c. xlix | City of London (Various Powers) Act 1959 | Sections eleven to sixteen. The Schedule. |

== Subsequent developments ==
The whole act was repealed by section 117(1) of, and part I of the schedule 14 to, the General Rate Act 1967, which came into force on 1 April 1968.
