= Poor Law Act 1927 =

Act of the Parliament of the United Kingdom

Poor Law Act 1927 (Note: Section 246(1).)
- Act of Parliament
- Parliament of the United Kingdom
- Long title: An Act to consolidate the enactments relating to the Relief of the Poor in England and Wales.
- Citation: 17 & 18 Geo. 5. c. 14
- Territorial extent: England and Wales (Note: Section 246(3).)

Dates
- Royal assent: 29 July 1927
- Commencement: 1 October 1927 (Note: Section 246(2).)
- Repealed: 1 January 1940
Other legislation
Amends	See § Repealed enactments
Repeals/revokes	See § Repealed enactments
Repealed by	Local Government Act 1929; Poor Law Act 1930; Local Government Act 1933; London Government Act 1939

Status: Repealed

Text of statute as originally enacted

The Poor Law Act 1927 (17 & 18 Geo. 5. c. 14) was an act of the Parliament of the United Kingdom that consolidated enactments relating to English poor law.

== Provisions ==
=== Short title, commencement and extent ===
Section 246(1) of the act provided that the act may be cited as the Poor Law Act, 1927.

Section 246(2) of the act provided that the act would come into force on 1 October 1927.

Section 246(3) of the act provided that the act would not extend to Scotland or Northern Ireland.

=== Repealed enactments ===
Section 245 of the act repealed 99 enactments, listed in the eleventh schedule to the act.

Citation	Short title	Description	Extent of repeal
43 Eliz. c. 2	Poor Relief Act 1601	The Poor Relief Act, 1601	Section one, except so far as it relates to the raising of taxes. Sections three, four, six and seventeen.
14 Car. 2 c.12	Poor Relief Act 1662	The Poor Relief Act, 1662	The whole act, except sections twenty-one, twenty-two and twenty-four.
3 Will. & Mar. c. 11	Poor Relief Act 1691	The Poor Relief Act, 1691	The whole act.
8 & 9 Will. 3. c. 30	Relief of the Poor Act 1696	An Act for supplying some Defects in the Laws for the Relief of the Poor of this Kingdom	The whole act.
9 Geo. 1. c. 7	Poor Relief Act 1722	The Poor Relief Act, 1722	The whole act except section three.
31 Geo. 2. c. 11	Apprentices (Settlement) Act 1767	The Apprentices (Settlement) Act, 1767	The whole act.
9 Geo. 3. c. 37	Poor Relief Act 1769	The Poor Relief Act, 1769	The whole act.
13 Geo. 3. c. 82	Lying-in Hospitals Act 1773	The Lying-in Hospitals Act, 1773	The whole act, except sections three, ten and eleven.
18 Geo. 3. c. 47	Parish Apprentices Act 1778	The Parish Apprentices Act, 1778	The whole act.
30 Geo. 3. c. 49	Workhouses Act 1790	The Workhouses Act, 1790	The whole act.
32 Geo. 3. c. 57	Parish Apprentices Act 1792	The Parish Apprentices Act, 1792	The whole act.
35 Geo. 3. c. 101	Poor Removal Act 1795	The Poor Removal Act, 1795	The whole act.
36 Geo. 3. c. 10	Poor Relief Act 1795	The Poor Relief Act, 1795	The whole act.
42 Geo. 3. c. 46	Parish Apprentices Act 1802	The Parish Apprentices Act, 1802	The whole act.
49 Geo. 3. c. 124	Poor (Settlement and Removal) Act 1809	The Poor (Settlement and Removal) Act, 1809	The whole act.
50 Geo. 3. c. 49	Poor Rate Act 1810	The Poor Rate Act, 1810	The whole act.
54 Geo. 3. c. 170	Poor Relief Act 1814	The Poor Relief Act, 1814	The whole act, except sections eleven and twelve.
55 Geo. 3. c. 137	Poor Relief Act 1815	The Poor Relief Act, 1815	The whole act.
56 Geo. 3. c. 129	Workhouse Act 1816	The Workhouse Act, 1816	The whole act.
56 Geo. 3. c. 139	Parish Apprentices Act 1816	The Parish Apprentices Act, 1816	The whole act.
59 Geo. 3. c. 12	Poor Relief Act 1819	The Poor Relief Act, 1819	Sections eleven to twenty-four, twenty-five and twenty-eight.
5 Geo. 4. c. 83	Vagrancy Act 1824	The Vagrancy Act, 1824	Section twenty.
6 Geo. 4. c. 57	Poor Relief (Settlement) Act 1825	The Poor Relief (Settlement) Act, 1825	The whole act.
1 Will. 4. c. 18	Poor Relief (Settlement) Act 1831	The Poor Relief (Settlement) Act, 1831	The whole act.
1 & 2 Will. 4. c. 42	Poor Relief Act 1831	The Poor Relief Act, 1831	The whole act.
1 & 2 Will. 4. c. 59	Crown Lands Allotments Act 1831	The Crown Lands Allotments Act, 1831	The whole act.
3 & 4 Will. 4. c. 63	Apprentices Act 1833	The Apprentices Act, 1833	The whole act.
4 & 5 Will. 4. c. 76	Poor Law Amendment Act 1834	The Poor Law Amendment Act, 1834	The whole act, except sections forty, eighty-five, eighty-six and one hundred and nine.
5 & 6 Will. 4. c. 69	Union and Parish Property Act 1835	The Union and Parish Property Act, 1835	The whole act, except section three so far as it relates to the disposal of parish property, and section nine.
7 Will. 4 & 1 Vict. c. 50	Union and Parish Property Act 1837	The Union and Parish Property Act, 1837	The whole act.
1 & 2 Vict. c. 25	Poor Relief (Loans) Act 1838	The Poor Relief (Loans) Act, 1838	The whole act.
5 & 6 Vict. c. 7	Parish Apprentices Act 1842	The Parish Apprentices Act, 1842	The whole act.
5 & 6 Vict. c. 18	Parish Property and Parish Debts Act 1842	The Parish Property and Parish Debts Act, 1842	The whole act, except sections two, three and nine.
5 & 6 Vict. c. 57	Poor Law Amendment Act 1842	The Poor Law Amendment Act, 1842	The whole act, except section eighteen.
7 & 8 Vict. c. 101	Poor Law Amendment Act 1844	The Poor Law Amendment Act, 1844	The whole act, except sections four, five, six, seven, eight, fourteen, fifteen, sixteen, twenty-two, sixty, sixty-one, sixty-two, sixty-three, seventy-four and seventy-five, and except section fifty-six so far as it relates to the registration of births and deaths.
9 & 10 Vict. c. 66	Poor Removal Act 1846	The Poor Removal Act, 1846	The whole act.
10 & 11 Vict. c. 109	Poor Law Board Act 184	The Poor Law Board Act, 1847	The whole act.
11 & 12 Vict. c. 31	Poor Law Procedure Act 1848	The Poor Law Procedure Act, 1848	The whole act.
11 & 12 Vict. c. 82	Poor Law (Schools) Act 1848	The Poor Law (Schools) Act, 1848	The whole act.
11 & 12 Vict. c. 91	Poor Law Audit Act 184	The Poor Law Audit Act, 1848	The whole act, except sections one, two, six, eleven and thirteen.
11 & 12 Vict. c. 110	Poor Law Amendment Act 1848	The Poor Law Amendment Act, 1848.	The whole act, except sections seven and twelve.
11 & 12 Vict. c. 111	Poor Removal Act 1848	The Poor Removal Act, 1848	The whole act.
12 & 13 Vict. c. 13	Poor Relief Act 1849	The Poor Relief Act, 1849	The whole act.
12 & 13 Vict. c. 103	Poor Law Amendment Act 1849	The Poor Law Amendment Act, 1849	The whole act, except sections three, six, fifteen, twenty-one and twenty-two.
13 & 14 Vict. c. 101	Poor Law Amendment Act 1850	The Poor Law Amendment Act, 1850	The whole act, except sections six, seven, eleven and twelve.
14 & 15 Vict. c. 11	Poor Law (Apprentices) Act 1851	The Poor Law (Apprentices) Act, 1851	The whole act.
14 & 15 Vict. c. 105	Poor Law Amendment Act 1851	The Poor Law Amendment Act, 1851	The whole act, except sections nine, nineteen and twenty.
18 & 19 Vict. c. 79	Poor (Burials) Act 1855	The Poor (Burials) Act, 1855	The whole act.
22 & 23 Vict. c. 49	Poor Law (Payment of Debts) Act 1859	The Poor Law (Payment of Debts) Act, 1859	The whole act.
24 & 25 Vict. c. 55	Poor Removal Act 1861	The Poor Removal Act, 1861	The whole act.
25 & 26 Vict. c. 43	Poor Law (Certified Schools) Act 1862	The Poor Law (Certified Schools) Act, 1862	The whole act.
27 & 28 Vict. c. 105	Poor Removal Act 1864	The Poor Removal Act, 1864	The whole act.
27 & 28 Vict. c. 116	Metropolitan Houseless Poor Act 1864	The Metropolitan Houseless Poor Act, 1864	The whole act.
28 & 29 Vict. c. 34	Metropolitan Houseless Poor Act 1865	The Metropolitan Houseless Poor Act, 1865	The whole act.
28 & 29 Vict. c. 79	Union Chargeability Act 1865	The Union Chargeability Act, 1865	The whole act.
29 & 30 Vict. c. 113	Poor Law Amendment Act 1866	The Poor Law Amendment Act, 1866	The whole act, except sections eleven, twelve, thirteen and eighteen.
30 & 31 Vict. c. 6	Metropolitan Poor Act 1867	The Metropolitan Poor Act, 1867	The whole act, except so much of section twenty-four as relates to the registration of births and deaths.
30 & 31 Vict. c. 106	Poor Law Amendment Act 1867	The Poor Law Amendment Act, 1867	The whole act, except sections seven, eight, ten, eleven, twenty-three and twenty-eight to thirty.
31 & 32 Vict. c. 122	Poor Law Amendment Act 1868	The Poor Law Amendment Act, 1868	The whole act, except sections five, seven, seven to thirty-two, thirty-eight to forty, forty-five and forty-six.
32 & 33 Vict. c. 45	Union Loans Act 1869	The Union Loans Act, 1869	The whole act.
32 & 33 Vict. c. 63	Metropolitan Poor Amendment Act 1869	The Metropolitan Poor Amendment Act, 1869	The whole act, except sections eight, twenty-four and twenty-five.
33 & 34 Vict. c. 2	Dissolved Boards of Management and Guardians Act 1870	The Dissolved Boards of Management and Guardians Act, 1870	The whole act.
33 & 34 Vict. c. 18	Metropolitan Poor Amendment Act 1870	The Metropolitan Poor Amendment Act, 1870	The whole act.
33 & 34 Vict. c. 48	Pauper Conveyance (Expenses) Act 1870	The Pauper Conveyance (Expenses) Act, 1870	The whole act.
34 & 35 Vict. c. 11	Poor Law Loans Act 187	The Poor Law Loans Act, 1871	The whole act.
34 & 35 Vict. c. 15	Metropolitan Poor Act 1871	The Metropolitan Poor Act, 1871	The whole act.
34 & 35 Vict. c. 108	Pauper Inmates Discharge and Regulation Act 1871	The Pauper Inmates Discharge and Regulation Act, 1871	The whole act.
35 & 36 Vict. c. 2	Poor Law Loans Act 187	The Poor Law Loans Act, 1872	The whole act.
38 & 39 Vict. c. 55	Public Health Act 1875	The Public Health Act, 1875	So much of Part III. of the Fifth Schedule as re-enacts 35 & 36 Vict. c. 79. s. 43. (Note: Public Health Act 1872)
39 & 40 Vict. c. 61	Divided Parishes and Poor Law Amendment Act 1876	The Divided Parishes and Poor Law Amendment Act, 1876	The whole act, except sections one to nine, twenty-four, twenty-nine, thirty-one, thirty-seven, thirty-nine, forty-two and forty-five, and except section nineteen from the beginning of the section to the words "to the contrary notwithstanding," and except the first paragraph of section twenty-one and of section twenty-four.
42 & 43 Vict. c. 12	Poor Law Amendment Act 1879	The Poor Law Amendment Act, 1879	The whole act.
42 & 43 Vict. c. 19	Habitual Drunkards Act 1879	The Habitual Drunkards Act, 1879	Section thirty-two.
42 & 43 Vict. c. 54	Poor Law Act 1879	The Poor Law Act, 1879	Sections eight, nine, ten, thirteen and fourteen.
45 & 46 Vict. c. 36	Casual Poor Act 1882	The Casual Poor Act, 1882	The whole act.
45 & 46 Vict. c. 58	Divided Parishes and Poor Law Amendment Act 1882	The Divided Parishes and Poor Law Amendment Act, 1882	Sections eight, twelve, thirteen and fourteen.
45 & 46 Vict. c. 75	Married Women's Property Act 1882	The Married Women's Property Act, 1882	Section twenty from the beginning of the section to the words "if she becomes chargeable to any union or parish," and section twenty-one.
46 & 47 Vict. c. 11	Poor Law Conferences Act 1883	The Poor Law Conferences Act, 1883	The whole act.
47 & 48 Vict. c. 43	Summary Jurisdiction Act 1884	The Summary Jurisdiction Act, 1884	Section eleven.
51 & 52 Vict. c. 41	Local Government Act 1888	The Local Government Act, 1888	Section fifty-eight.
52 & 53 Vict. c. 56	Poor Law Act 188	The Poor Law Act, 1889	The whole act, except sections eight, nine and ten.
56 & 57 Vict. c. 73	Local Government Act 1894	The Local Government Act, 1894	Section twenty; subsection (3) of section twenty-five; section thirty; section forty-six so far as it relates to boards of guardians; section forty-eight so far as it relates to the election of boards of guardians and so far as they relate to guardians, subsections (1) and (2) of section fifty-nine; sections sixty and sixty-one.
57 & 58 Vict. c. 25	Outdoor Relief Friendly Societies Act 1894	The Outdoor Relief Friendly Societies Act, 1894	The whole act.
59 & 60 Vict. c. 1	Local Government (Elections) Act 1896	The Local Government (Elections) Act, 1896	The whole act so far as it relates to boards of guardians.
60 & 61 Vict. c. 29	Poor Law Act 1897	The Poor Law Act, 1897	The whole act.
61 & 62 Vict. c. 19	Poor Law Unions Association (Expenses) Act 1898	The Poor Law Unions Association (Expenses) Act, 1898	The whole act.
61 & 62 Vict. c. 45	Metropolitan Poor Act 1898	The Metropolitan Poor Act, 1898	The whole act.
61 & 62 Vict. c. 60	Inebriates Act 1898	The Inebriates Act, 1898	Section twenty-two.
62 & 63 Vict. c. 37	Poor Law Act 1899	The Poor Law Act, 1899 -	The whole act.
63 & 64 Vict. c. 16	District Councillors and Guardians (Term of Office) Act 1900	The District Councillors and Guardians (Term of Office) Act, 1900.	The whole act so far as it relates to boards of guardians.
3 Edw. 7. c. 19	Poor Law (Dissolution of School Districts and Adjustment) Act 1903	The Poor Law (Dissolution of School Districts and Adjustment) Act, 1903	The whole act.
4 Edw. 7. c. 20	Poor Law Authorities (Transfer of Property) Act 1904	The Poor Law Authorities (Transfer of Property) Act, 1904	The whole act.
4 Edw. 7. c. 32	Outdoor Relief Friendly Societies Act 1904	The Outdoor Relief Friendly Societies Act, 1904	The whole act.
7 Edw. 7. c. 14	Released Persons (Poor Law Relief) Act 1907	The Released Persons (Poor Law Relief) Act, 1907	The whole act.
8 Edw. 7. c. 27	Married Women's Property Act 1908	The Married Women's Property Act, 1908	The whole act.
8 Edw. 7. c. 67	Children Act 1908	The Children Act, 1908	Sections thirty-six, thirty-nine and one hundred and twenty-six.
3 & 4 Geo. 5. c. 28	Mental Deficiency Act 1913	The Mental Deficiency Act, 1913	Section sixty-nine.
12 & 13 Geo. 5. c. 51	Allotments Act 1922	The Allotments Act, 1922	Subsection (4) of section twenty-one.
14 & 15 Geo. 5. c. 38	National Health Insurance Act 1924	The National Health Insurance Act, 1924.	Subsection (1) of section one hundred and five.
16 & 17 Geo. 5. c. 20	Boards of Guardians (Default) Act 1926	The Boards of Guardians (Default) Act, 1926	The whole act.

== Subsequent developments ==
The whole act was repealed by section 207 of, and the eighth schedule to, the London Government Act 1939 (2 & 3 Geo. 6. c. 40), which came into force on 1 January 1940.
