= Local Government Act 1933 =

Act of the Parliament of the United Kingdom

Local Government Act 1933 (Note: Section 308(1).)
- Act of Parliament
- Parliament of the United Kingdom
- Long title: An Act to consolidate with amendments the enactments relating to authorities for the purposes of local government in England and Wales exclusive (except in relation to certain matters) of London.
- Citation: 23 & 24 Geo. 5. c. 51
- Territorial extent: England and Wales (Note: Section 308(2).)

Dates
- Royal assent: 17 November 1933
- Commencement: 1 June 1934 (Note: Section 308(1).)
- Repealed: 1 April 1974
Other legislation
Amends	Towns Improvement Clauses Act 1847
Repeals/revokes	County Rates Act 1815
Amended by	Public Health Act 1936; Food and Drugs Act 1938; Local Government (Boundary Commission) Act 1945; Town and Country Planning Act 1947; Electricity Act 1947; Local Government Act 1948; National Assistance Act 1948; Representation of the People Act 1948; Representation of the People Act 1949; Local Government Boundary Commission (Dissolution) Act 1949; Justices of the Peace Act 1949; Local Government Act 1958; Charities Act 1960; Public Bodies (Admission to Meetings) Act 1960; London Government Act 1963; Police Act 1964; Local Government Act 1966; General Rate Act 1967; Theft Act 1968; Justices of the Peace Act 1968; Courts Act 1971
Repealed by	Local Government Act 1972
Relates to	London Government Act 1939

Status: Repealed

Text of statute as originally enacted

The Local Government Act 1933 (23 & 24 Geo. 5. c. 51) was an act of the Parliament of the United Kingdom that consolidated and revised existing legislation that regulated local government in England (except the County of London) and Wales. It remained the principal legislation regulating local government until the Local Government Act 1972 took effect in 1974.

== Powers of local authorities ==
Although local authorities acquired few new powers or duties, the act did include a few innovations:

- One section dealt with custody of records, and led to the establishment of county record offices
- It became easier for local authorities to form joint committees where they had a common interest
- A council could acquire land outside of its area in order to perform its functions
- County councils could agree to exchange areas of land to form more efficient boundaries
- Rural and urban district councils, previously elected annually by thirds, could opt for elections of the whole council, triennially.

== Administrative areas and local authorities ==
Although the act did not create new local government areas, it repealed most of the Local Government Act 1888 (51 & 52 Vict. c. 41) and Local Government Act 1894 (56 & 57 Vict. c. 73), and parts of the Municipal Corporations Act 1882 (45 & 46 Vict. c. 50), and re-established the existing councils and administrative areas.

Section 1 of the act stated:

(1) For the purposes of local government, England and Wales (exclusive of London) shall be divided into administrative counties and county boroughs, and administrative counties shall be divided into county districts, being either non-county boroughs, urban districts or rural districts, and county boroughs and county districts shall consist of one or more parishes.
(2) Subject to any alteration of boundaries or the constitution of new authorities which may take effect after the passing of this Act--

(a) the administrative counties shall be the administrative counties which are named in Part I of the First Schedule to this Act;
(b) the county boroughs shall be the boroughs which are named in Part II of the First Schedule to this Act;
(c) the non-county boroughs shall be the boroughs which are named in Part III of the First Schedule to this Act;
(d) the urban districts shall be the urban districts other than boroughs existing at the passing of this Act;
(e) the rural districts shall be the rural districts existing at the passing of this Act; and
(f) the parishes shall be the urban parishes which at the passing of this Act are comprised in boroughs or urban districts, and the rural parishes which at the passing of this Act are comprised in rural districts.

(3) Every county borough shall, with respect to the functions which the council of the borough discharge, form a separate administrative area.

The term "non-county boroughs" was introduced in preference to "municipal borough" as county boroughs were also legally municipal boroughs. The councils for each of these various areas were to be known by the generic term of "local authorities" in this and subsequent legislation.

The actual titles of the councils remained the same:

- X county council (or council of the county of X) for administrative counties
- The mayor, aldermen and burgesses of the borough of Y (or (lord) mayor, aldermen and citizens of the city of Z) for boroughs
- W urban district council (or urban district council of W)
- V rural district council (or rural district council of V)

Rural parishes were governed by parish councils or parish meetings.

=== Local government areas listed in the act ===
Administrative counties

(a) England (exclusive of London)

- Bedford
- Berks
- Buckingham
- Cambridge
- Chester
- Cornwall
- Cumberland
- Derby
- Devon
- Durham
- Essex
- Gloucester
- Hereford
- Hertford
- Huntingdon
- Isle of Ely
- Isle of Wight
- Kent
- Lancaster
- Leicester
- Lincoln, Parts of Holland
- Lincoln, Parts of Kesteven
- Lincoln, Parts of Lindsey
- Middlesex
- Monmouth
- Norfolk
- Northampton
- Northumberland
- Nottingham
- Oxford
- Rutland
- Salop
- Soke of Peterborough
- Somerset
- Southampton
- Stafford
- Suffolk, East
- Suffolk, West
- Surrey
- Sussex, East
- Sussex, West
- Warwick
- Westmorland
- Wilts
- Worcester
- York, East Riding
- York, North Riding
- York, West Riding

(b) Wales

- Anglesey
- Brecknock
- Caernarvon
- Cardigan
- Carmarthen
- Denbigh
- Flint
- Glamorgan
- Merioneth
- Montgomery
- Pembroke
- Radnor

County boroughs

(a) England

- Barnsley
- Barrow-in-Furness
- Bath
- Birkenhead
- Birmingham
- Blackburn
- Blackpool
- Bolton
- Bootle
- Bournemouth
- Bradford
- Brighton
- Bristol
- Burnley
- Burton upon Trent
- Bury
- Canterbury
- Carlisle
- Chester
- Coventry
- Croydon
- Darlington
- Derby
- Dewsbury
- Doncaster
- Dudley
- Eastbourne
- East Ham
- Exeter
- Gateshead
- Gloucester
- Great Yarmouth
- Grimsby
- Halifax
- Hastings
- Huddersfield
- Ipswich
- Kingston-upon-Hull
- Leeds
- Leicester
- Lincoln
- Liverpool
- Manchester
- Middlesbrough
- Newcastle-upon-Tyne
- Newport
- Northampton
- Norwich
- Nottingham
- Oldham
- Oxford
- Plymouth
- Portsmouth
- Preston
- Reading
- Rochdale
- Rotherham
- Saint Helens
- Salford
- Sheffield
- Smethwick
- Southampton
- Southend-on-Sea
- Southport
- South Shields
- Stockport
- Stoke-on-Trent
- Sunderland
- Tynemouth
- Wakefield
- Wallasey
- Walsall
- Warrington
- West Bromwich
- West Ham
- West Hartlepool
- Wigan
- Wolverhampton
- Worcester
- York

(b) Wales

- Cardiff
- Merthyr Tydfil
- Swansea

Non-county boroughs

(a) England

Administrative county	Non-county boroughs
Bedford	Bedford, Dunstable, Luton
Berks	Abingdon, Maidenhead, Newbury, New Windsor, Wallingford, Wokingham
Buckingham	Aylesbury, Buckling, Chepping Wycombe
Cambridge	Cambridge
Chester	Congleton, Crewe, Dukinfield, Hyde, Macclesfield, Stalybridge
Cornwall	Bodmin, Dunheved otherwise Launceston, Falmouth, Fowey, Helston, Liskeard, Lostwithiel, Penryn, Penzance, Saint Ives, Saltash, Truro
Cumberland	Whitehaven, Workington
Derby	Buxton, Chesterfield, Glossop, Ilkeston
Devon	Barnstaple, Bideford, Clifton Dartmouth Hardness, Great Torrington, Honiton, Okehampton, South Molton, Tiverton, Totnes
Dorset	Bridport, Dorchester, Lyme Regis, Poole, Shaftesbury, Wareham, Weymouth and Melcombe Regis
Durham	Durham, Hartlepool, Jarrow, Stockton-on-Tees
Essex	Barking, Chelmsford, Colchester, Harwich, Ilford, Leyton, Maldon, Saffron Walden, Walthamstow
Gloucester	Cheltenham, Tewkesbury
Hereford	Hereford, Leominster
Hertford	Hemel Hempstead, Hertford, Saint Alban, Watford
Huntingdon	Godmanchester, Huntingdon, Saint Ives
Isle of Ely	Wisbech
Isle of Wight	Newport, Ryde
Kent	Bromley, Chatham, Dartford, Deal, Dover, Faversham, Folkestone, Gillingham, Gravesend, Hythe, Lydd, Maidstone, Margate, New Romney, Queenborough, Ramsgate, Rochester, Sandwich, Tenterden, Royal Tunbridge Wells
Lancaster	Accrington, Ashton-under-Lyne, Bacup, Chorley, Clitheroe, Colne, Darwen, Eccles, Fleetwood, Haslingden, Heywood, Lancaster, Lytham Saint Anne's, Middleton, Morecambe and Heysham, Mossley, Nelson, Rawtenstall, Stretford, Widnes
Leicester	Loughborough
Lincoln, Parts of Holland	Boston
Lincoln, Parts of Kesteven	Grantham, Stamford
Lincoln, Parts of Lindsey	Louth
Middlesex	Acton, Brentford and Chiswick, Ealing, Finchley, Hendon, Heston and Isleworth, Hornsey, Southgate, Twickenham, Willesden, Wood Green
Monmouth	Abergavenny, Monmouth
Norfolk	King's Lynn, Thetford
Northampton	Brackley, Daventry, Higham Ferrers
Northumberland	Berwick-upon-Tweed, Blyth, Morpeth, Wallsend
Nottingham	East Retford, Mansfield, Newark, Worksop
Oxford	Banbury, Chipping Norton, Henley-upon-Thames, Woodstock
Salop	Bishop's Castle, Bridgnorth, Ludlow, Oswestry, Shrewsbury, Wenlock
Soke of Peterborough	Peterborough
Somerset	Bridgwater, Chard, Glastonbury, Taunton, Wells, Yeovil
Southampton	Aldershot, Andover, Basingstoke, Christchurch, Gosport, Lymington, Romsey, Winchester
Stafford	Bilston, Lichfield, Newcastle-under-Lyme, Rowley Regis, Stafford, Tamworth, Wednesbury
Suffolk, East	Aldeburgh, Beccles, Eye, Lowestoft, Southwold
Suffolk, West	Bury Saint Edmunds, Sudbury
Surrey	Barnes, Godalming, Guildford, Kingston upon Thames, Reigate, Richmond, Wimbledon
Sussex, East	Bexhill, Hove, Lewes, Rye
Sussex, West	Arundel, Chichester, Worthing
Warwick	Nuneaton, Royal Leamington Spa, Rugby, Stratford-upon-Avon, Sutton Coldfield, Warwick
Westmorland	Appleby, Kendal
Wilts	Calne, Chippenham, Devizes, Malmesbury, Marlborough, New Sarum, Swindon, Wilton
Worcester	Bewdley, Droitwich, Evesham, Kidderminster, Stourbridge
York, East Riding	Beverley, Bridlington, Hedon
York, North Riding	Redcar, Richmond, Scarborough, Thornaby-on-Tees
York, West Riding	Batley, Brighouse, Goole, Harrogate, Keighley, Morley, Ossett, Pontefract, Pudsey, Ripon, Todmorden

(b) Wales

Administrative county	Non-county boroughs
Anglesey	Beaumaris
Brecknock	Brecknock
Caernarvon	Bangor, Caernarvon, Conway, Pwllheli
Cardigan	Aberystwith, Cardigan, Lampeter
Carmarthen	Carmarthen, Kidwelly, Llandovery, Llanelly
Denbigh	Denbigh, Ruthin, Wrexham
Flint	Flint
Glamorgan	Cowbridge, Neath, Port Talbot
Montgomery	Llanfyllin, Llanidloes, Montgomery, Welshpool
Pembroke	Haverfordwest, Pembroke, Tenby

=== Repealed enactments ===
Section 307(1)(a) of the act repealed the Public Health Act 1875 (38 & 39 Vict. c. 55), the Municipal Corporations Act 1882 (45 & 46 Vict. c. 50) and the Local Government Act 1888 (51 & 52 Vict. c. 41) to the extents specified in the first, second and third parts of the eleventh schedule to the act, respectively.

Section 307(1)(b) of the act repealed 223 enactments, listed in the fourth part of the eleventh schedule to the act.

Citation	Short title	Description	Extent of repeal
22 Hen. 8. c. 5	Bridges Act 1530	An Acte concernyng the amendment of Bridge in Highe Wayes	In section three, the words from "and that the same justices" to the end of the section. Section six.
9 Anne. c. 25 (Note: This is the citation in The Statutes of the Realm.)	Municipal Offices Act 1710	The Municipal Offices Act, 1710	The whole act so far as unrepealed.
12 Geo. 2. c. 29	County Rates Act 1738	The County Rates Act, 1738	In section six, the words from "such person or persons" to "appoint to be," and the words from "(which treasurer or treasurers" to "reposed in him or them." Sections seven to nine. Section eleven. In section fourteen, the words from "such contractor or contractors" to the end of the section.
17 Geo. 2. c. 38	Poor Relief Act 1743	The Poor Relief Act, 1743	Sections one and two.
43 Geo. 3. c. 59	Bridges Act 1803	The Bridges Act, 1803	In section one, the words from "appointed or to be appointed" to "such county."
55 Geo. 3. c. 51	County Rates Act 1815	The County Rates Act, 1815	Section seventeen.
55 Geo. 3. c. 143	Bridges Act 1815	The Bridges Act, 1815	In section one, the words from "to be appointed" to "for such county." In section five the words from "Provided nevertheless" to the end of the section.
58 Geo. 3. c. 69	Vestries Act 1818	The Vestries Act, 1818	Section six.
59 Geo. 3. c. 12	Poor Relief Act 1819	The Poor Relief Act, 1819	Section seventeen.
7 Geo. 4. c. 63	County Buildings Act 1826	The County Buildings Act, 1826	The whole act, except so far as relates to assize courts, sessions houses and judges lodgings.
3 & 4 Will. 4. c. 90	Lighting and Watching Act 1833	The Lighting and Watching Act, 1833	In section five, the words "less than ten days and not," and the words from "and that notification of the time" to the end of the section. In section six, the words from the beginning of the section to "such meetings, and". In section nine, the words from "Provided nevertheless" to the end of the section. Sections ten and eleven. In section twelve, the words from "carefully examine" to "manner hereafter prescribed," and the words from "Provided also" where they secondly occur to the end of the section. Section fourteen. In section seventeen, the words "by any ten persons qualified" "to vote on behalf of any such" "candidates," the words from "and in a book" to "the said office," and the words from "and if such poll" to the end of the section. Sections eighteen and nineteen so far as relates to parish councils. Sections twenty-two and twenty-three, so far as relates to parish councils. In section twenty-four, so far as relates to parish councils, the words "treasurer and other" in both places where those words occur, the words from "and to hire" to "transacting their business," the words from "and also to agree" to "house or room," and the words "and such rent." Sections twenty-five to twenty-seven, so far as relates to parish councils. Section twenty-eight. Sections thirty and thirty-one, so far as relates to parish councils. Sections fifty-seven to fifty-nine, so far as relates to parish councils.
5 & 6 Will. 4. c. 50	Highway Act 1835	The Highway Act, 1835	Section six to eighteen. Section forty-six. Section forty-eight.
7 Will. 4 & 1 Vict. c. 24	County Buildings Act 1837	The County Buildings Act, 1837	The whole act, except so far as relates to assize courts, sessions houses and judges lodgings.
7 Will. 4 & 1 Vict. c. 45	Parish Notices Act 1837	The Parish Notices Act, 1837	In section three, the words "or by an overseer of the poor of such parish."
7 Will. 4 & 1 Vict. c. 83	Parliamentary Documents Deposit Act 1837	The Parliamentary Documents Deposit Act, 1837	The whole act.
2 & 3 Vict. c. 84	Poor Rate Act 1839	The Poor Rate Act, 1839	Section three.
2 & 3 Vict. c. 93	County Police Act 1839	The County Police Act, 1839	In section twenty-three, the words from "and shall produce the same" to the end of the section.
3 & 4 Vict. c. 88	County Police Act 1840	The County Police Act, 1840	In section twelve, the words from "and for that purpose" to the end of the section. Section thirteen.
4 & 5 Vict. c. 38	School Sites Act 1841	The Schools Sites Act, 1841	In section six, the words from "Provided also, that the justices" to the end of the section.
5 & 6 Vict. c. 109	Parish Constables Act 1842	The Parish Constables Act, 1842	In section twenty-two, the words from "and for that purpose" to "such appropriation"; and the words from "and the expense" to "county rates."
7 & 8 Vict. c. 101	Poor Law Amendment Act 1844	The Poor Law Amendment Act, 1844	Section sixty-one.
8 & 9 Vict. c. 71	Highway Act 1845	The Highway Act, 1845	The whole act.
9 & 10 Vict. c. 74	Baths and Washhouses Act 1846	The Baths and Wash-houses Act, 1846	In section four, the words from "the income arising" to "thereof, and". In section five, the words from "after public notice" to "holding such vestry." Sections nine to eleven, except so far as relates to commissioners appointed under the Act. In section twelve, the words "a clerk and," the word "other," the word "clerk" where that word secondly occurs, and the words from "and when necessary" to the end of the section, except so far as relates to commissioners appointed under the Act. Section thirteen, except so far as relates to commissioners appointed under the Act. In section fourteen, the words from "and such books" to the end of the section, except so far as relates to commissioners appointed under the Act. Section fifteen, except so far as relates to commissioners appointed under the Act. In section twenty-one, the words from "at interest" to "of the parish," except so far as relates to commissioners appointed under the Act. In section twenty-three, the words from "with respect to the borrowing" to "provisions of the same Act" where those words secondly occur, except so far as relates to commissioners appointed under the Act. Section twenty-four, except so far as relates to commissioners appointed under the Act. Section twenty-six, except so far as relates to commissioners appointed under the Act. Section thirty-one, except so far as relates to commissioners appointed under the Act. Section thirty-nine.
10 & 11 Vict. c. 28	County Buildings Act 1847	The County Buildings Act, 1847	The whole act, except so far as relates to assize courts, sessions houses and judges lodgings.
10 & 11 Vict. c. 34	Towns Improvement Clauses Act 1847	The Towns Improvement Clauses Act, 1847	Sections seven to twelve.
10 & 11 Vict. c. 61	Baths and Washhouses Act 1847	The Baths and Wash-houses Act, 1847	In section four, the words "council and" and the word "respectively."
13 & 14 Vict. c. 57	Vestries Act 1850	The Vestries Act, 1850	The whole act.
13 & 14 Vict. c. 101	Poor Law Amendment Act 1850	The Poor Law Amendment Act, 1850	Section six.
15 & 16 Vict. c. 5	Municipal Corporations Act 1852	The Municipal Corporations Act, 1852	The whole act, so far as unrepealed.
15 & 16 Vict. c. 81	County Rates Act 1852	The County Rates Act, 1852	In section thirty-three, the words from "and every overseer" to the end of the section.
15 & 16 Vict. c. 85	Burial Act 1852	The Burial Act, 1852	Sections thirteen and fourteen, except so far as relates to burial boards appointed under the Burial Acts, 1852 to 1906. In section fifteen, the words "a clerk and," the word "other," the word "clerk" where it secondly occurs, and the words from "and, when necessary," to the end of the section, except so far as relates to burial boards appointed under the Burial Acts, 1852 to 1906. In section sixteen, the words from the beginning of the section to "contrary be proved; and," except so far as relates to burial boards appointed under the Burial Acts, 1852 to 1906. Sections seventeen to twenty, except so far as relates to burial boards appointed under the Burial Acts, 1852 to 1906. In section twenty-six, the words from "to contract for and purchase" to "think fit, or," except so far as relates to burial boards appointed under the Burial Acts, 1852 to 1906. Section twenty-eight, except so far as relates to burial boards appointed under the Burial Acts, 1852 to 1906. In section thirty-one, the words from "which contracts" to the end of the section, except so far as relates to burial boards appointed under the Burial Acts, 1852 to 1906.
17 & 18 Vict. c. 87	Burial Act 1854	The Burial Act, 1854	In section three the words from the beginning of the section to "construed accordingly; and," the words "money raised for defraying such expenses aforesaid, and of," and the words from "Provided always" to the end of the section. Sections four and five, except so far as relates to burial boards appointed under the Burial Acts, 1852 to 1906. Section six. Section eleven.
17 & 18 Vict. c. 112	Literary and Scientific Institutions Act 1854	The Literary and Scientific Institutions Act, 1854	In section six, the words "justices of the peace" and the word "justices" where that word secondly occurs. In section seven, the words from "and the justices" to the end of the section.
20 & 21 Vict. c. 81	Burial Act 1857	The Burial Act, 1857	Sections nineteen to twenty-one, except so far as relates to burial boards appointed under the Burial Acts, 1852 to 1906.
21 & 22 Vict. c. 90	Medical Act 1858	The Medical Act, 1858	In section thirty-six, the words "or as a medical officer of health."
23 & 24 Vict. c. 51	Local Taxation Returns Act 1860	The Local Taxation Returns Act, 1860	The whole act.
23 & 24 Vict. c. 64	Burial Act 1860	The Burial Act, 1860	Sections one to three.
23 & 24 Vict. c. 68	South Wales Highways Act 1860	The South Wales Highways Act, 1860	Section three. Sections fourteen to eighteen. Sections twenty-seven to thirty.
24 & 25 Vict. c. 125	Parochial Offices Act 1861	The Parochial Offices Act, 1861	The whole act.
25 & 26 Vict. c. 61	Highway Act 1862	The Highway Act, 1862	Sections twelve to fifteen. Section thirty-one.
25 & 26 Vict. c. 100	Burial Act 1862	The Burial Act, 1862	The whole act.
26 & 27 Vict. c. 13	Town Gardens Protection Act 1863	The Town Gardens Protection Act, 1863	In section three, the words from "and the expenses" to the end of the section.
27 & 28 Vict. c. 101	Highway Act 1864	The Highway Act, 1864	Section twenty. Section twenty-seven. Sections twenty-nine and thirty. Section thirty-two. Section thirty-six. Section forty-five. In section forty-seven, the words "with the approval of the justices in general or quarter sessions assembled" and the words from "Previously to applying" to the end of the section. Section fifty. Section fifty-three. First Schedule. Second Schedule.
28 & 29 Vict. c. 126	Prison Act 1865	The Prison Act, 1865	Section eight.
29 & 30 Vict. c. 113	Poor Law Amendment Act 1866	The Poor Law Amendment Act, 1866	Section thirteen.
30 & 31 Vict. c. 106	Poor Law Amendment Act 1867	The Poor Law Amendment Act, 1867	Section ten. Section twenty-eight.
31 & 32 Vict. c. 22	Petty Sessions and Lock-up House Act 1868	The Petty Sessions and Lock-up House Act, 1868	Section eleven.
31 & 32 Vict. c. 122	Poor Law Amendment Act 1868	The Poor Law Amendment Act, 1868	Section twenty-seven.
32 & 33 Vict. c. 49	Local Stamp Act 1869	The Local Stamp Act, 1869	Section seven.
33 & 34 Vict. c. 23	Forfeiture Act 1870	The Forfeiture Act, 1870	Section two, so far as relates to members of local authorities.
33 & 34 Vict. c. 78	Tramways Act 1870	The Tramways Act, 1870	In section twenty, the words "and take up at interest on the credit of such local rate," and the words from "and for the purpose of securing" to "the local authority." In section forty-three, the words "out of the like rate" and "on the security of the same." In section forty-four, the words from "may pay" to "for such purposes."
33 & 34 Vict. c. 91	Clerical Disabilities Act 1870	The Clerical Disabilities Act, 1870	In the First Schedule, paragraph (2).
34 & 35 Vict. c. 70	Local Government Board Act 1871	The Local Government Board Act, 1871	Section eight. In the Schedule, in Part I, the words "Returns. Local Taxation" in the first column, and the words "23 & 24 Vict. c. 51" in the second column.
35 & 36 Vict. c. 33	Ballot Act 1872	The Ballot Act, 1872	In section fourteen the words "municipal or." In section twenty-four, the words "and municipal" wherever those words occur, and the words "or at a municipal election." In section twenty-nine, paragraph (a) in the definition of the expression "the Municipal Corporations Acts," and paragraph (a) in the definition of the expression "municipal election." In the First Schedule, in Part II, paragraph 64.
35 & 36 Vict. c. 91	Borough Funds Act 1872	The Borough Funds Act, 1872	The whole act.
36 & 37 Vict. c. 19	Poor Allotments Management Act 1873	The Poor Allotments Management Act, 1873	Section fifteen.
37 & 38 Vict. c. 45	County of Hertford and Liberty of St. Alban Act 1874	The County of Hertford and Liberty of St. Alban Act, 1874	Sections twenty-one to twenty-six. Section forty-one.
38 & 39 Vict. c. 17	Explosives Act 1875	The Explosives Act, 1875	In section seventy-two, the words from "acquire any land" to "to them, and," and the words from "Such sums shall be applied" to "to include any right over land," except so far as relates to harbour authorities.
38 & 39 Vict. c. 83	Local Loans Act 1875	The Local Loans Act, 1875	In section eight, the words from the beginning of the section to "date of such loan," and the words "the priority of the loan and to", so far as relates to local authorities as defined in this Act. Section sixteen, so far as relates to local authorities as defined in this Act. Section thirty-six.
39 & 40 Vict. c. 36	Customs Consolidation Act 1876	The Customs Consolidation Act, 1876	In section nine, the words "mayor or".
39 & 40 Vict. c. 56	Commons Act 1876	The Commons Act, 1876	In section eight, the words from "The expenses incurred" to "provided for."
39 & 40 Vict. c. 61	Divided Parishes and Poor Law Amendment Act 1876	The Divided Parishes and Poor Law Amendment Act, 1876	Sections one to nine. Section thirty-seven.
39 & 40 Vict. c. 62	Sale of Exhausted Parish Lands Act 1876	The Sale of Exhausted Parish Lands Act, 1876	The whole act.
39 & 40 Vict. c. 75	Rivers Pollution Prevention Act 1876	The Rivers Pollution Prevention Act, 1876	In section eight, the words from "Any expenses incurred" to "1875". In section fourteen, the words from the beginning of the section to "such order and". Section fifteen.
40 & 41 Vict. c. 21	Prison Act 1877	The Prisons Act, 1877	Section forty-six.
40 & 41 Vict. c. 60	Canal Boats Act 1877	The Canal Boats Act, 1877	In section eight, in subsection (1), the words "an urban sanitary authority, a rural sanitary authority or" and the words from "Provided that" to "general expenses".
40 & 41 Vict. c. 66	Local Taxation Returns Act 1877	The Local Taxation Returns Act, 1877	The whole act.
40 & 41 Vict. c. 68	Destructive Insects Act 1877	The Destructive Insects Act, 1877	In section four, the words from "the expenses incurred" to "local rate".
41 & 42 Vict. c. 34	South Wales Highway Act Amendment Act 1878	The South Wales Highway Act Amendment Act, 1878	In section two, the words from "with the approval" to "are situate." Sections three to seven. Sections ten and eleven.
41 & 42 Vict. c. 77	Highways and Locomotives (Amendment) Act 1878	The Highways and Locomotives (Amendment) Act, 1878	In section five, subsection (3). Sections six to nine. In section eighteen the words from "and the accounts so kept" to "county authority may direct". Section twenty-five.
42 & 43 Vict. c. 6	District Auditors Act 1879	The District Auditors Act, 1879	The whole act.
42 & 43 Vict. c. 39	Highway Accounts Returns Act 1879	The Highway Accounts Returns Act, 1879	The whole act.
42 & 43 Vict. c. 54	Poor Law Act 1879	The Poor Law Act, 1879	Sections four to seven.
45 & 46 Vict. c. 30	Baths and Wash Houses Act 1882	The Baths and Washhouses Act, 1882	Section three, except so far as relates to commissioners appointed under the Baths and Washhouses Act, 1846.
45 & 46 Vict. c. 56	Electric Lighting Act 1882	The Electric Lighting Act, 1882	In section seven the words from "may be defrayed" to "provided that," and the words "such expenses" where they secondly occur. In section eight the words from "on such security" to the end of the section. In the Schedule, the entries in the fourth, fifth, sixth and seventh columns relating to urban sanitary districts and rural sanitary districts.
45 & 46 Vict. c. 58	Divided Parishes and Poor Law Amendment Act 1882	The Divided Parishes and Poor Law Amendment Act, 1882	The whole act.
45 & 46 Vict. c. 67	South Wales Turnpike Roads Amendment Act 1882	The South Wales Turnpike Roads Amendment Act, 1882	Section four.
46 & 47 Vict. c. 18	Municipal Corporations Act 1883	The Municipal Corporations Act, 1883	Section seven.
46 & 47 Vict. c. 52	Bankruptcy Act 1883	The Bankruptcy Act, 1883	In section thirty-two, in subsection (1), paragraph (d), and in paragraph (e) the words from "guardian of the poor" to "sanitary authority, or" and the words "school board, highway board." In section thirty-four, the words from "mayor" to "overseer, or" and the words "sanitary authority, school board, highway board."
47 & 48 Vict. c. 54	Yorkshire Registries Act 1884	The Yorkshire Registries Act, 1884	Section thirty-four. In section thirty-seven, sub-section (5) and (7). Sections forty-one and forty-two.
47 & 48 Vict. c. 70	Municipal Elections (Corrupt and Illegal Practices) Act 1884	The Municipal Elections (Corrupt and Illegal Practices) Act, 1884	In section thirty-six, subsection (1). First Schedule.
47 & 48 Vict. c. 74	Public Health (Officers) Act 1884	The Public Health (Officers) Act, 1884	The whole act.
47 & 48 Vict. c. 75	Canal Boats Act 1884	The Canal Boats Act, 1884	In section four, the words from "shall for the purpose" to "purposes of those Acts, and".
48 & 49 Vict. c. 10	Elections (Hours of Poll) Act 1885	The Election (Hours of Poll) Act, 1885	The whole act, except so far as relates to parliamentary elections.
48 & 49 Vict. c. 22	Public Health and Local Government Conferences Act 1885	The Public Health and Local Government Conferences Act, 1885	The whole act.
48 & 49 Vict. c. 29	Honorary Freedom of Boroughs Act 1885	The Honorary Freedom of Boroughs Act, 1885	The whole act.
48 & 49 Vict. c. 38	School Boards Act 1885	The School Boards Act, 1885	The whole act.
48 & 49 Vict. c. 53	Public Health (Members and Officers) Act 1885	The Public Health (Members and Officers) Act, 1885	The whole act.
48 & 49 Vict. c. 72	Housing of the Working Classes Act 1885	The Housing of the Working Classes Act, 1885	In section ten, in subsection (2), the words from "and sections two hundred and ninety-three" to the end of the subsection.
50 & 51 Vict. c. 72	Local Authorities (Expenses) Act 1887	The Local Authorities (Expenses) Act, 1887	The whole act.
51 & 52 Vict. c. 54	Sea Fisheries Regulation Act 1888	The Sea Fisheries Regulation Act, 1888	In section one, in subsection (3), the words from "in like manner" to the end of the subsection.
52 & 53 Vict. c. 32	Trust Investment Act 1889	The Trust Investment Act, 1889	The whole act.
52 & 53 Vict. c. 72	Infectious Disease (Notification) Act 1889	The Infectious Disease (Notification) Act, 1889	Section nine. In section eleven, the words from the beginning of the section to "or parochial office."
53 & 54 Vict. c. 5	Lunacy Act 1890	The Lunacy Act, 1890	Sections one hundred and seventy-four and one hundred and seventy-five. In section two hundred and twenty-four, in subsection (3), the words "under the Local Government Act, 1888." In section two hundred and forty, the words "respectively constituted under the Local Government Act, 1888." Section two hundred and fifty-six. In section two hundred and seventy-four, in subsection (1), the words from "with the consent of" to "applicable to the local authority," and the words from "on the security" to "part of the revenues."
53 & 54 Vict. c. 21	Inland Revenue Regulation Act 1890	The Inland Revenue Regulation Act, 1890	In section eight, the words "mayor or."
53 & 54 Vict. c. 34	Infectious Disease (Prevention) Act 1890	The Infectious Disease (Prevention) Act, 1890	Section twenty.
53 & 54 Vict. c. 59	Public Health Acts Amendment Act 1890	The Public Health Acts Amendment Act, 1890	Section four. Sections forty-eight and forty-nine. In section fifty, the words from "Section forty-eight" to the end of the section. Section fifty-two.
53 & 54 Vict. c. 71	Bankruptcy Act 1890	The Bankruptcy Act, 1890	In section nine, the words from "It is hereby declared" to the end of the section.
54 & 55 Vict. c. 22	Museums and Gymnasiums Act 1891	The Museums and Gymnasiums Act, 1891	In section nine, the words from "appoint and pay" to "and may." In section ten, subsection (2); in subsection (3), the words from "in like manner" to "said general expenses," and the words from "sections two hundred and thirty-three" to "(relating to borrowing) and"; and in subsection (4) the words from "and such accounts" to the end of the subsection. Section eleven.
54 & 55 Vict. c. 63	Highways and Bridges Act 1891	The Highways and Bridges Act, 1891	Section five.
54 & 55 Vict. c. 68	County Councils (Elections) Act 1891	The County Councils (Elections) Act, 1891	The whole act.
55 & 56 Vict. c. 15	Charity Inquiries (Expenses) Act 1892	The Charity Inquiries (Expenses) Act, 1892	In section one, subsection (2).
55 & 56 Vict. c. 18	Weights and Measures (Purchase) Act 1892	The Weights and Measures (Purchase) Act, 1892	In section one, in subsection (3), the words from "may borrow money" where those words first occur, to "1888," and the words "in accordance with the Public Health Act, 1875"; and subsection (4).
55 & 56 Vict. c. 43	Military Lands Act 1892	The Military Lands Act, 1892	Section four. Section six. In section eleven, in subsection (1), paragraphs (b) and (d).
55 & 56 Vict. c. 53	Public Libraries Act 1892	The Public Libraries Act, 1892	Section seven and eight, except so far as relates to commissioners appointed under the Act. In section fifteen, in subsection (2), the words "also appoint salaried officers and servants, and dismiss them and," except so far as relates to parish councils and to commissioners appointed under the Act; and subsection (3). In section eighteen, subsection (1). In section nineteen, in subsection (1) the words "on the security of any fund or rate applicable for those purposes," and subsection (2), except so far as relates to commissioners appointed under the Act. In section twenty, in subsection (1), the words from "and those accounts" to the end of the subsection; in subsection (2), the words from "in like manner" to the end of the subsection; and subsection (3), except so far as relates to commissioners appointed under the Act.
55 & 56 Vict. c. 57	Private Street Works Act 1892	The Private Street Works Act, 1892	In section fifteen, the words from "and may pay" to the end of the section. In section eighteen, the words from "on the security" to "are payable," and the words from "and the powers" to the end of the section. Section twenty-three.
56 & 57 Vict. c. 9	Municipal Corporations Act 1893	The Municipal Corporations Act, 1893	The whole act.
56 & 57 Vict. c. 32	Barbed Wire Act 1893	The Barbed Wire Act, 1893	Section five.
56 & 57 Vict. c. 68	Isolation Hospitals Act 1893	The Isolation Hospitals Act, 1893	In section four, in subsection (1), the words from "and any such application" to the end of the subsection. In section twenty-two, the words from "on the security" to "1888." In section twenty-four, the words "and five."
56 & 57 Vict. c. 73	Local Government Act 1894	The Local Government Act, 1894	Sections one to four. In section five in subsection (2), paragraph (c). In section six, in subsection (1), in paragraph (b), the words from "but inclusive" to the end of the paragraph, and in paragraph (c), the words "vestry room or parochial office, parish chest." In section eight, in subsection (1), paragraph (a), in paragraph (b), the words "for such buildings and"; and paragraph (h); and subsection (2). Section nine. Section eleven. Section twelve. Section fifteen. Sections seventeen and eighteen. In section nineteen, subsections (1) to (3), (6), (7), and (9) to (11). In section twenty-one, subsection (2); and in subsection (3), the words "and every other" except so far as they apply to any enactment passed before the commencement of this Act. Sections twenty-two to twenty-four. In section twenty-five, subsections (5) and (6). In section twenty-seven, in subsection (1), paragraphs (d) and (f). Sections twenty-eight and twenty-nine. Section thirty-three. Sections thirty-six to forty-two. Sections forty-five to forty-nine. Section fifty-one. In section fifty-two, subsection (3). Sections fifty-four to fifty-eight. Section fifty-nine. Sections sixty and sixty-one. Section sixty-four. Sections sixty-eight and sixty-nine. Sections seventy-one to seventy-four. Section seventy-eight. Section eighty. In section eighty-one, in subsection (1) the words from "and for the purposes" to the end of the subsection; subsection (2); in subsection (4) the words "vestry clerk and assistant overseer"; subsections (5) and (6); and in subsection (7) the words from "provided that" to the end of the subsection. Section eighty-three. Sections eighty-five to eighty-nine. First Schedule.
57 & 58 Vict. c. 57	Diseases of Animals Act 1894	The Diseases of Animals Act, 1894	In section thirty-three, subsection (2); and in subsection (3) the words from "provided that" to the end of the sub-section. In section forty, subsection (1); and in subsection (2), paragraphs (i) and (iii). In section forty-two, in subsection (1), the words "at interest on the credit of the local rate," and the words from "and may secure" to the end of the subsection; and subsections (2), (3) and (5).
58 & 59 Vict. c. 32	Local Government (Stock Transfer) Act 1895	The Local Government (Stock Transfer) Act, 1895	The whole act.
59 & 60 Vict. c. 1	Local Government (Elections) Act 1896	The Local Government (Elections) Act, 1896	The whole act.
59 & 60 Vict. c. 22	Chairmen of District Councils Act 1896	The Chairmen of District Councils Act, 1896	The whole act.
59 & 60 Vict. c. 48	Light Railways Act 1896	The Light Railways Act, 1896	In section sixteen, in subsection (2), the words "in manner authorised by the order"; and subsection (4). Section seventeen. Third Schedule.
60 & 61 Vict. c. 1	Local Government Act 1897	The Local Government Act, 1897	The whole act.
60 & 61 Vict. c. 31	Cleansing of Persons Act 1897	The Cleansing of Persons Act, 1897	In section one, the words from "and any expenses" to the end of the section.
60 & 61 Vict. c. 40	Local Government (Joint Committees) Act 1897	The Local Government (Joint Committees) Act, 1897	In section one, in subsection (1), paragraph (c).
62 & 63 Vict. c. 10	Parish Councillors (Tenure of Office) Act 1899	The Parish Councillors (Tenure of Office) Act, 1899	The whole act.
62 & 63 Vict. c. 14	London Government Act 1899	The London Government Act, 1899	In section eight, subsection (4). Section fourteen.
62 & 63 Vict. c. 30	Commons Act 1899	The Commons Act, 1899.	In section five, the words from "and the provisions" to the end of the section. In section seven, the words from "and the expenses" to the end of the section. In section eleven, subsection (2), and in subsection (3), the words from "in like manner" to the end of the subsection.
62 & 63 Vict. c. 38	Telegraph Act 1899	The Telegraph Act, 1899.	In section two, in subsection (1), the words from "defray the expenses" to "and may", and the words from "in accordance with" to "borough rate."
62 & 63 Vict. c. 44	Small Dwellings Acquisition Act 1899	The Small Dwellings Acquisition Act, 1899.	In section nine, in subsection (3), the words from the beginning of the subsection to "Public Health Acts; but"; and in subsection (5), the words from "in like manner" to the end of the subsection.
63 & 64 Vict. c. 13	County Councils (Elections) Amendment Act 1900	The County Councils (Elections) Amendment Act, 1900.	The whole act.
63 & 64 Vict. c. 16	District Councillors and Guardians (Term of Office) Act 1900	The District Councillors and Guardians (Term of Office) Act, 1900.	The whole act.
63 & 64 Vict. c. 46	Members of Local Authorities Relief Act 1900	The Members of Local Authorities Relief Act, 1900.	The whole act.
1 Edw. 7 c. 8	Isolation Hospitals Act 1901	The Isolation Hospitals Act, 1901.	In section two, in subsection (2), the words "in manner provided by section twenty-two of the principal Act."
1 Edw. 7 c. 22	Factory and Workshop Act 1901	The Factory and Workshop Act, 1901.	In section fourteen, in subsection (8), paragraph (a), and in paragraph (b), the words "incurred in the execution of the Public Health Act, 1875."
2 Edw. 7 c. 17	Midwives Act 1902	The Midwives Act, 1902.	In section eight, the words from "The local supervising authority may delegate," to the end of the section. Section fifteen.
2 Edw. 7 c. 41	Metropolis Water Act 1902	The Metropolis Water Act, 1902.	In section nineteen, the words from "and that the stamp duty" to the end of the section. In section twenty-one, subsection (2).
3 Edw. 7 c. 9	County Councils (Bills in Parliament) Act 1903	The County Councils (Bills in Parliament) Act, 1903.	The whole act.
3 Edw. 7 c. 14	Borough Funds Act 1903	The Borough Funds Act, 1903.	The whole act.
3 Edw. 7 c. 15	Local Government (Transfer of Powers) Act 1903	The Local Government (Transfer of Powers) Act, 1903.	The whole act.
6 Edw. 7 c. 12	Municipal Corporations Amendment Act 1906	The Municipal Corporations Amendment Act, 1906.	The whole act.
6 Edw. 7 c. 14	Alkali, &c. Works Regulation Act 1906	The Alkali, &c., Works Regulation Act, 1906.	Section twenty-four.
6 Edw. 7 c. 25	Open Spaces Act 1906	The Open Spaces Act, 1906.	In section seventeen, paragraphs (a) and (c); in paragraph (d), the words from "incurred in the execution" to the end of the paragraph; and paragraph (e). In section eighteen, the words "in the case of a county council as for the purposes of the Local Government Act, 1888"; and the words from "in the case of a municipal borough" to the end of the section.
6 Edw. 7 c. 33	Local Authorities (Treasury Powers) Act 1906	The Local Authorities (Treasury Powers) Act, 1906.	In section one, in subsection (1), the words "or any local or private Act."
7 Edw. 7 c. 27	Advertisements Regulation Act 1907	The Advertisements Regulation Act, 1907.	In section three, subsection (6). In section four, the words "in the case of a county out of the county fund," and the words from "in the case of a borough" to "Public Health Acts."
7 Edw. 7 c. 33	Qualification of Women (County and Borough Councils) Act 1907	The Qualification of Women (County and Borough Councils) Act, 1907.	The whole act.
7 Edw. 7 c. 40	Notification of Births Act 1907	The Notification of Births Act, 1907.	In section one, subsection (6).
7 Edw. 7 c. 53	Public Health Acts Amendment Act 1907	The Public Health Acts Amendment Act, 1907.	Section four. In section five, in subsection (1), the words from "and the inspectors" to the end of the subsection; subsection (2); and in subsection (3), the words from "The person holding" to the end of the subsection. In section ninety-five, the words from "and notwithstanding" to the end of the section.
8 Edw. 7 c. 13	Polling Districts (County Councils) Act 1908	The Polling Districts (County Councils) Act, 1908.	The whole act.
8 Edw. 7 c. 36	Small Holdings and Allotments Act 1908	The Small Holdings and Allotments Act, 1908.	In section thirty-five, subsection (4). In section fifty-two, in subsection (1), the words from "in accordance with" to the end of the subsection; and subsection (4). In section fifty-three, subsection (1); and in subsection (4), paragraphs (a) and (b).
8 Edw. 7 c. 48	Post Office Act 1908	The Post Office Act, 1908.	In section forty-three, the words "mayor or." In section forty-nine, subsection (4); in subsection (5) the words from "and shall be apportioned" to the end of the subsection; subsection (6); and in subsection (7) the words from "under section one hundred and six" to "amending the same," and the words from "in like manner" to the end of the subsection.
8 Edw. 7 c. 67	Children Act 1908	The Children Act, 1908.	In section ten, in subsection (2), paragraph (c).
9 Edw. 7 c. 30	Cinematograph Act 1909	The Cinematograph Act, 1909.	In section six, the words from "and the expenses" to the end of the section.
9 Edw. 7 c. 34	Electric Lighting Act 1909	The Electric Lighting Act, 1909.	Section twenty-one.
9 Edw. 7 c. 38	County Councils Mortgages Act 1909	The County Councils Mortgages Act, 1909.	The whole act.
9 Edw. 7 c. 44	Housing, Town Planning, etc. Act 1909	The Housing, Town Planning, &c., Act, 1909.	Sections sixty-eight and sixty-nine.
10 Edw. 7. & 1 Geo. 5 c. 19	Municipal Corporations Amendment Act 1910	The Municipal Corporations Amendment Act, 1910.	The whole act.
1 & 2 Geo. 5 c. 52	Rag Flock Act 1911	The Rag Flock Act, 1911.	In section one, in subsection (6), paragraph (c).
2 & 3 Geo. 5 c. 3	Shops Act 1912	The Shops Act, 1912.	In section thirteen, in subsection (3), the words from "in the case of the council of a borough" to "Public Health Acts."
2 & 3 Geo. 5 c. 19	Light Railways Act 1912	The Light Railways Act, 1912.	In section five, subsections (5) and (6).
3 & 4 Geo. 5 c. 17	Fabrics (Misdescription) Act 1913	The Fabrics (Misdescription) Act, 1913.	In section five, in subsection (3), the words from "in the case of the council of a borough" to "Public Health Acts."
3 & 4 Geo. 5 c. 19	Local Government (Adjustments) Act 1913	The Local Government (Adjustments) Act, 1913.	The whole act except so far as relates to alterations of areas or other changes which took effect before the first day of April, 1930.
3 & 4 Geo. 5 c. 23	Public Health (Prevention and Treatment of Disease) Act 1913	The Public Health (Prevention and Treatment of Disease) Act, 1913.	In section four, the words "in the case of a sanitary authority" and the words from "as part of the expenses" to "Acts, and."
3 & 4 Geo. 5 c. 28	Mental Deficiency Act 1913	The Mental Deficiency Act, 1913.	In section twenty-eight, subsection (3). In section thirty-three, in subsection (1), the words from the beginning of the subsection to "Provided that"; and in subsection (2), the words from "in the case of a county council" to the end of the subsection. In section thirty-eight, in subsection (3), the words "in the case of the council of a county under and in accordance with the Local Government Act, 1888, and."
3 & 4 Geo. 5 c. 32	Ancient Monuments Consolidation and Amendment Act 1913	The Ancient Monuments Consolidation and Amendment Act, 1913.	In section twenty-one, in subsection (2), the words from "in the case of any other county council" to "as a borough rate," and the words from "in the case of a county council" to the end of the subsection.
4 & 5 Geo. 5 c. 21	County and Borough Councils (Qualification) Act 1914	The County and Borough Councils (Qualification) Act, 1914.	The whole act.
4 & 5 Geo. 5 c. 31	Housing Act 1914	The Housing Act, 1914.	In section one, in subsection (2), the words from "Any expenses" to "1890;" and the words "the like," and the words "as they have for the purposes of that Part of that Act."
5 & 6 Geo. 5 c. 48	Fishery Harbours Act 1915	The Fishery Harbours Act, 1915.	In section three, in subsection (1), in paragraph (a), the words "out of the county fund"; and paragraphs (b) and (c); and in subsection (2), the words from "in the case of a county council" to the end of the subsection.
5 & 6 Geo. 5 c. 64	Notification of Births (Extension) Act 1915	The Notification of Births (Extension) Act, 1915.	In section two, subsection (2).
5 & 6 Geo. 5 c. 66	Milk and Dairies (Consolidation) Act 1915	The Milk and Dairies (Consolidation) Act, 1915.	In section fifteen, subsection (2). In section seventeen, in paragraph (a), the words "out of the county fund," and paragraph (d).
6 & 7 Geo. 5 c. 12	Local Government (Emergency Provisions) Act 1916	The Local Government (Emergency Provisions) Act, 1916.	In section thirteen, subsection (1). Section fourteen.
6 & 7 Geo. 5 c. 43	War Charities Act 1916	The War Charities Act, 1916.	In section two, in subsection (1), the words from "Provided that" to the end of the subsection; and subsection (7).
6 & 7 Geo. 5 c. 69	Public Authorities and Bodies (Loans) Act 1916	The Public Authorities and Bodies (Loans) Act, 1916.	The whole act.
7 & 8 Geo. 5 c. 64	Representation of the People Act 1918	The Representation of the People Act, 1918.	Section ten. In section fifteen, in subsection (1), the words "out of the county fund, and," and the words from "and in the case of the council of a borough" to the end of the subsection. In section sixteen, in subsection (1), the words "of the general district rate for the borough fund or borough rate." In section thirty-five, the words "The Local Government (Elections) Act, 1896."
8 & 9 Geo. 5 c. 29	Maternity and Child Welfare Act 1918	The Maternity and Child Welfare Act, 1918.	In section two, subsection (3).
9 & 10 Geo. 5 c. 59	Land Settlement (Facilities) Act 1919	The Land Settlement (Facilities) Act, 1919.	In section fourteen, subsection (4).
9 & 10 Geo. 5 c. 72	Rats and Mice (Destruction) Act 1919	The Rats and Mice (Destruction) Act, 1919.	In section five, subsection (3).
9 & 10 Geo. 5 c. 75	Ferries (Acquisition by Local Authorities) Act 1919	The Ferries (Acquisition by Local Authorities) Act, 1919.	In section one, subsection (7); and in subsection (8), the words "if a county council," and the words from "under section sixty-nine" to the end of the subsection.
9 & 10 Geo. 5 c. 93	Public Libraries Act 1919	The Public Libraries Act, 1919.	In section one, in subsection (3), the words from "as for the purposes" to the end of the subsection. In section four, subsection (3).
9 & 10 Geo. 5 c. 99	Housing (Additional Powers) Act 1919	The Housing (Additional Powers) Act, 1919.	Section eight.
10 & 11 Geo. 5 c. 49	Blind Persons Act 1920	The Blind Persons Act, 1920.	In section two, subsection (2); and in subsection (3), the words from "in the case of a county council" to the end of the subsection.
10 & 11 Geo. 5 c. 57	Unemployment (Relief Works) Act 1920	The Unemployment (Relief Works) Act, 1920.	In section three, in subsection (2), the words from "in the case of the council of a county" to "1888," and the words from "and in the case of any other council" to the end of the subsection.
10 & 11 Geo. 5. c. 80	Air Navigation Act 1920	The Air Navigation Act, 1920	In section eight, in subsection (3), the words from "in the case of a county council" to the end of the subsection; and in subsection (4) the words from "and in the case of a county council" to the end of the subsection.
11 & 12 Geo. 5. c. 12	Public Health (Tuberculosis) Act 1921	The Public Health (Tuberculosis) Act, 1921	In section eight, subsection (2).
11 & 12 Geo. 5. c. 23	Public Health (Officers) Act 1921	The Public Health (Officers) Act, 1921	The whole act except so far as relates to port sanitary authorities.
11 & 12 Geo. 5. c. 32	Finance Act 1921	The Finance Act, 1921	Section sixty-one.
11 & 12 Geo. 5. c. 51	Education Act 1921	The Education Act, 1921	In section four, in subsection (3), the words from "and the meetings" to the end of the subsection. In section ten, the words "The minutes of the proceedings of a local education authority, and." In section one hundred and twenty-three, subsection (1). Section one hundred and twenty-four. In section one hundred and thirty-two, the words from "in the case of a county council" to the end of the section. Section one hundred and forty-five. In section one hundred and fifty-seven, the words "and (5)." In the First Schedule, Parts II and III.
11 & 12 Geo. 5. c. 67	Local Authorities (Financial Provisions) Act 1921	The Local Authorities (Financial Provisions) Act, 1921	Section three, except the proviso to subsection (3), so far as relates to local authorities as defined in this Act. Section four, so far as relates to local authorities as defined in this Act. Section six, so far as relates to local authorities as defined in this Act.
12 & 13 Geo. 5. c. 12	Representation of the People Act 1922	The Representation of the People Act, 1922	Section two.
12 & 13 Geo. 5. c. 14	Audit (Local Authorities, &c.) Act 1922	The Audit (Local Authorities, etc.) Act, 1922	The whole act.
12 & 13 Geo. 5. c. 35	Celluloid and Cinematograph Film Act 1922	The Celluloid and Cinematograph Film Act, 1922	In section four, subsection (2).
12 & 13 Geo. 5. c. 46	Electricity (Supply) Act 1922	The Electricity (Supply) Act, 1922	In section two, the words "or by a local authority." In section five, in subsection (2), paragraphs (a) and (c) and the words from "Section twenty-one" to the end of the subsection.
12 & 13 Geo. 5. c. 51	Allotments Act 1922	The Allotments Act, 1922	In section eighteen, in subsection (1) the words from the beginning of the subsection to "eighty years, and," and subsection (2).
13 & 14 Geo. 5. c. 6	Local Authorities (Emergency Provisions) Act 1923	The Local Authorities (Emergency Provisions) Act, 1923	Section two.
13 & 14 Geo. 5. c. 13	Rent Restrictions (Notices of Increase) Act 1923	The Rent Restrictions (Notices of Increase) Act, 1923	In section three, subsection (6).
13 & 14 Geo. 5. c. 16	Salmon and Freshwater Fisheries Act 1923	The Salmon and Freshwater Fisheries Act, 1923	In section forty-one, the words "or county council," and the words from "and (b)" to the end of the section.
13 & 14 Geo. 5. c. 24	Housing, &c. Act 1923	The Housing, etc., Act, 1923	In section two, in subsection (6), the words "under Part III of the principal Act." Section sixteen. In section twenty-two, paragraph (f). Second Schedule.
13 & 14 Geo. 5. c. 32	Rent and Mortgage Interest Restrictions Act 1923	The Rent and Mortgage Interest Restrictions Act, 1923	In section eighteen, subsection (4).
14 & 15 Geo. 5. c. 29	Local Authorities (Emergency Provisions) Act 1924	The Local Authorities (Emergency Provisions) Act, 1924	The whole act.
14 & 15 Geo. 5. c. 38	National Health Insurance Act 1924	The National Health Insurance Act, 1924	In section eighty-five, in subsection (2), the words from "and in the case of the council of a county" to "as the case may be"; and in subsection (3), the words from "and any sums payable" to the end of the subsection.
15 & 16 Geo. 5. c. 11	Borough Councillors (Alteration of Number) Act 1925	The Borough Councillors (Alteration of Number) Act, 1925	Section one. In section three, the words from the beginning of the section to "this Act, and," and the words "or scheme."
15 & 16 Geo. 5. c. 14	Housing Act 1925	The Housing Act, 1925	In section fifty-seven, in subsection (3), the words "whether of contract or otherwise." In section eighty-one, in subsection (1), the words from "and in any other case" to the end of the subsection; and in subsection (2), the words from "The expenses incurred" to the end of the subsection. In section eighty-four, in subsection (2), paragraph (d) and proviso (i). In section eighty-five, in subsection (1), the words from "under and in accordance with" to the end of the subsection, except so far as relates to mental hospital boards. Section eighty-eight. In section ninety-five, subsection (2). In section one hundred and eleven, subsection (1). In section one hundred and sixteen, in subsection (1) the words from "and the costs" to the end of the subsection, and in subsection (2) the words "or any local inquiry which he may cause to be held." Section one hundred and twenty-five. In section one hundred and thirty, subsection (2).
15 & 16 Geo. 5. c. 50	Theatrical Employers Registration Act 1925	The Theatrical Employers Registration Act, 1925	In section twelve, in subsection (2), the words from "in the case of the council of a county borough" to the end of the subsection.
15 & 16 Geo. 5. c. 54	Ministers of Religion (Removal of Disqualifications) Act 1925	The Ministers of Religion (Removal of Disqualifications) Act, 1925	The whole act.
15 & 16 Geo. 5. c. 71	Public Health Act 1925	The Public Health Act, 1925	In section thirty-four, in subsection (3), the words "subject to and in accordance with the provisions of the Local Government Act, 1888." In section fifty-five, the words "subject to the provisions of the Public Health Acts, 1875 to 1907." In section sixty-nine, subsection (4). In section seventy, subsection (2). Section seventy-nine. In the Fourth Schedule, the words "Section 4—Expenses of local authority."
15 & 16 Geo. 5. c. 90	Rating and Valuation Act 1925	The Rating and Valuation Act, 1925	In section one, subsection (3), and in subsection (4) the words "in pursuance of this section." In section nine, in subsection (2), in paragraph (e), the words from "and, for the purpose" to the end of the paragraph. In section twelve, subsections (2) and (3). In section fifty-three, subsection (4). In section fifty-four, in subsection (1), the words from "in like manner" to the end of the subsection. In section fifty-five, subsections (2), (3) and (4). Section fifty-six. In section sixty, subsection (3). In section sixty-one, in subsection (1) the words from "and such inspectors" to the end of the subsection, and subsection (2).
16 & 17 Geo. 5. c. 10	Local Authorities (Emergency Provisions) Act 1926	The Local Authorities (Emergency Provisions) Act, 1926	The whole act.
16 & 17 Geo. 5. c. 31	Home Counties (Music and Dancing) Licensing Act 1926	The Home Counties (Music and Dancing) Licensing Act, 1926	In section four, subsection (1).
16 & 17 Geo. 5. c. 38	Local Government (County Boroughs and Adjustments) Act 1926	The Local Government (County Boroughs and Adjustments) Act, 1926	Sections one to four. Section five, except so far as relates to alterations of boundaries and other changes which took effect before the first day of April, 1930.
16 & 17 Geo. 5. c. 43	Public Health (Smoke Abatement) Act 1926	The Public Health (Smoke Abatement) Act, 1926	Section six.
16 & 17 Geo. 5. c. 52	Small Holdings and Allotments Act 1926	The Small Holdings and Allotments Act, 1926	In section fourteen, in subsection (4), the words "under section fifty-two of the principal Act."
16 & 17 Geo. 5. c. 54	Wireless Telegraphy (Blind Persons Facilities) Act 1926	The Wireless Telegraphy (Blind Persons Facilities) Act, 1926	In section two, in subsection (1), the words from "The expenses incurred" to "borough rate."
16 & 17 Geo. 5. c. 56	Housing (Rural Workers) Act 1926	The Housing (Rural Workers) Act, 1926	In section five, in subsection (3) the words "by the local authority," and the words from "and in the case of any other council" to "Public Health Acts," in subsection (4), the words from "in the case of the council of a county" to "1925," and subsection (5). Sections six and seven.
16 & 17 Geo. 5. c. 59	Coroners (Amendment) Act 1926	The Coroners (Amendment) Act, 1926	In section one, subsection (3).
17 & 18 Geo. 5. c. 14	Poor Law Act 1927	The Poor Law Act, 1927	The whole act, so far as unrepealed, except section two hundred and seven.
17 & 18 Geo. 5. c. 31	Audit (Local Authorities) Act 1927	The Audit (Local Authorities) Act, 1927	The whole act.
17 & 18 Geo. 5. c. 38	Nursing Homes Registration Act 1927	The Nursing Homes Registration Act, 1927	In section nine, in subsection (4), the words from the beginning of the subsection to "Provided that," and the words from "and the amount" to the end of the subsection.
18 & 19 Geo. 5. c. 9	Local Authorities (Emergency Provisions) Act 1928	The Local Authorities (Emergency Provisions) Act, 1928	The whole act.
19 & 20 Geo. 5. c. 17	Local Government Act 1929	The Local Government Act, 1929	In section nine, paragraph (a). Section ten. In section fourteen, in subsection (3), the words from the beginning of the subsection to “relating to public health.” Sections forty-seven to forty-nine. In section fifty-one, in subsection (1), the words from the beginning of the subsection to “of any district, and.” Sections fifty-two to fifty-six. Section fifty-eight. In section seventy-four, subsection (2). In section one hundred and eight, subsection (2). In section one hundred and fifteen, subsection (2), and in subsection (6) the words “and the Seventh Schedule to this Act.” In section one hundred and seventeen, in subsection (4) the words “under the Public Health Acts, 1875 to 1926.” In section one hundred and twenty-eight, in subsection (1) the words “or county borough,” the words “(a) in the case of a county council,” and the words from “(b) in the case of a county borough council” to the end of the subsection, and in subsection (3), the words from “and in the case of any other county council” to the end of the subsection. In section one hundred and twenty-nine, in subsection (1) the words from “and such inspectors” to the end of the subsection; in subsection (2) the words from “as if those purposes” to the end of the subsection; in subsection (3) the words from “as if those purposes” to the end of the subsection; and subsection (4). In the First Schedule, in Part I and in Part III the words “S. 176. So far as required for highway purposes and the purposes of S. 154.” In the Third Schedule, paragraph 3, except so far as relates to payments to port sanitary authorities. The Seventh Schedule. In the Ninth Schedule, in Part I, paragraph 2. In the Tenth Schedule, paragraphs 8, 9, 14, 21 so far as unrepealed, and 22, and in paragraph 26, sub-paragraph (b).
19 & 20 Geo. 5. c. 33	Bridges Act 1929	The Bridges Act, 1929	In section eight, subsection (1); and in subsection (2), the words from “as a highway authority” where those words first occur to the end of the subsection.
20 & 21 Geo. 5. c. 17	Poor Law Act 1930	The Poor Law Act, 1930	Section seven. In section ten, in subsection (3) the words from “and the amount and nature” to “to give security.” In section one hundred and ten, paragraph (a). Section one hundred and fourteen. In section one hundred and seventeen the words “or county borough”, the words “(a) in the case of a county council,” and the words from “and (b)” to the end of the section. In section one hundred and eighteen, the words from “and in the case of any other county council” to the end of the section. In section one hundred and thirty-six, in section (1), paragraphs (e) and (f). Section one hundred and forty. Section one hundred and forty-four. Sections one hundred and fifty-five and one hundred and fifty-six.
20 & 21 Geo. 5. c. 23	Mental Treatment Act 1930	The Mental Treatment Act, 1930	In section six, in subsection (3), in paragraph (e), the words “or joint exercise of”.
20 & 21 Geo. 5. c. 39	Housing Act 1930	The Housing Act, 1930	In section fifty-four, in subsection (3), the words from “in accordance” to the end of the subsection.
20 & 21 Geo. 5. c. 43	Road Traffic Act 1930	The Road Traffic Act, 1930	In section twenty-seven, in subsection (5), the words from “and in the case of a borough” to “1926”; and the words from “in the case of a county council under” to the end of the subsection. In section ninety, in subsection (10), the words from “in the case of a county council” to the end of the subsection. In section one hundred and seven, in subsection (1) paragraph (a), in subsection (2) paragraph (a), and subsection (3) except so far as relates to joint boards or joint committees.
20 & 21 Geo. 5. c. 44	Land Drainage Act 1930	The Land Drainage Act, 1930	In section thirty-two, in subsection (2), the words from “under those Acts” to the end of the subsection. In section forty-nine, in subsection (3), the words from “in like manner” to the end of the subsection. In section fifty-three, in subsection (2), paragraphs (a) and (b). Section sixty-nine. In section seventy-three, the words from “or (b)” to “boundary lines are altered”.
21 & 22 Geo. 5. c. 45	Local Government (Clerks) Act 1931	The Local Government (Clerks) Act, 1931	In section two, subsections (1) and (2). In section three, in subsection (1), paragraph (a), and subsection (2). In section four, in subsection (2), the words from “(c) in the case of a clerk” to the end of the subsection; in subsection (3) the words “the office of clerk of the county council or” and the words “to either of those offices”; and subsection (6). In section five, subsection (1); and in subsection (3), the words from “so far as they relate to the administrative business” to “every county shall.” Section six. In section seven, in subsection (1), the words “as respects clerks and deputy clerks of a county council references to the county council, and”; in subsection (2), paragraph (a); and subsection (4). In section eight, in subsection (1), the words from “in carrying out his duties as such” to “parliamentary elections, and”; and subsection (4). In section eleven, in subsection (1), paragraph (b).
22 & 23 Geo. 5. c. 25	Finance Act 1932	The Finance Act, 1932	Section thirty.
22 & 23 Geo. 5. c. 48	Town and Country Planning Act 1932	The Town and Country Planning Act, 1932	In section thirty-eight, in subsection (1), the words from “and the costs incurred” to the end of the subsection, subsection (2), and in subsection (3) the words from “and may confer” to the end of the subsection. In section forty-nine, in subsection (2), paragraphs (c) and (d).
23 & 24 Geo. 5. c. 12	Children and Young Persons Act 1933	The Children and Young Persons Act, 1933	In section twenty-seven, subsection (3). In section ninety-six, in subsection (5), paragraph (a); and in subsection (6) the words from “and in the case of any other county council” to the end of the subsection. In section ninety-eight, subsection (2).
23 & 24 Geo. 5. c. 28	Municipal Corporations (Audit) Act 1933	The Municipal Corporations (Audit) Act, 1933	The whole act.

Section 307(1)(b) of the act repealed 34 enactments for London, listed in the fifth part of the eleventh schedule to the act.

Citation	Short title	Description	Extent of Repeal
17 Geo. 2. c. 38	Poor Relief Act 1743	The Poor Relief Act, 1743.	Sections one and two.
9 & 10 Vict. c. 74	Baths and Washhouses Act 1846	The Baths and Washhouses Act, 1846.	Section fifteen.
15 & 16 Vict. c. 81	County Rates Act 1852	The County Rates Act, 1852.	In section thirty-three, the words from "and every overseer" to the end of the section.
15 & 16 Vict. c. 85	Burial Act 1852	The Burial Act, 1852.	Section eighteen.
23 & 24 Vict. c. 51	Local Taxation Returns Act 1860	The Local Taxation Returns Act, 1860.	The whole act.
29 & 30 Vict. c. 113	Poor Law Amendment Act 1866	The Poor Law Amendment Act, 1866.	Section thirteen.
30 & 31 Vict. c. 106	Poor Law Amendment Act 1867	The Poor Law Amendment Act, 1867.	Section twenty-eight.
34 & 35 Vict. c. 70	Local Government Board Act 1871	The Local Government Board Act, 1871.	Section eight. In the Schedule, in Part I, the words "Returns. Local Taxation" in the first column, and the words "23 & 24 Vict. c. 51" in the second column.
38 & 39 Vict. c. 55	Public Health Act 1875	The Public Health Act, 1875.	Sections two hundred and forty-five to two hundred and forty-seven. Sections two hundred and forty-nine and two hundred and fifty.
39 & 40 Vict. c. 61	Divided Parishes and Poor Law Amendment Act 1876	The Divided Parishes and Poor Law Amendment Act, 1876.	Section thirty-seven.
40 & 41 Vict. c. 66	Local Taxation Returns Act 1877	The Local Taxation Returns Act, 1877.	The whole act.
41 & 42 Vict. c. 77	Highways and Locomotives (Amendment) Act 1878	The Highways and Locomotives (Amendment) Act, 1878.	Section nine. In section eighteen, the words from "and the accounts so kept" to "county authority may direct."
42 & 43 Vict. c. 6	District Auditors Act 1879	The District Auditors Act, 1879.	The whole act.
42 & 43 Vict. c. 39	Highway Accounts Returns Act 1879	The Highways Accounts Returns Act, 1879.	The whole act.
45 & 46 Vict. c. 50	Municipal Corporations Act 1882	The Municipal Corporations Act, 1882.	Sections twenty-six to twenty-eight.
50 & 51 Vict. c. 72	Local Authorities (Expenses) Act 1887	The Local Authorities (Expenses) Act, 1887.	The whole act.
51 & 52 Vict. c. 41	Local Government Act 1888	The Local Government Act, 1888.	Section seventy-one. Section seventy-three. In section eighty-one, in subsection (1) the words "county council or councils and any"; in subsection (2) the words "council or" wherever those words occur; subsection (3); in subsection (4) the words "council and"; in subsection (5) the words "council or" wherever those words occur and the words from "so that where" to the end of the subsection; subsection (6); and in subsection (7) the words from the beginning of the subsection to "administrative counties and." Section eighty-two, except so far as it applies to joint committees appointed under section eighty-one. Second Schedule.
55 & 56 Vict. c. 53	Public Libraries Act 1892	The Public Libraries Act, 1892.	In section twenty, subsection (1), in subsection (2) the words from "in like manner" to the end of the subsection, and subsection (3).
56 & 57 Vict. c. 73	Local Government Act 1894	The Local Government Act, 1894.	Section fifty-seven.
59 & 60 Vict. c. 48	Light Railways Act 1896	The Light Railways Act, 1896.	Section seventeen. Third Schedule.
62 & 63 Vict. c. 14	London Government Act 1899	The London Government Act, 1899.	In section eight, subsection (4). Section fourteen.
2 Edw. 7. c. 41	Metropolis Water Act 1902	The Metropolis Water Act, 1902.	In section nineteen, the words from "and that the stamp duty" to the end of the section.
6 & 7 Geo. 5. c. 12	Local Government (Emergency Provisions) Act 1916	The Local Government (Emergency Provisions) Act, 1916.	In section thirteen, subsection (1). Section fourteen.
9 & 10 Geo. 5. c. 93	Public Libraries Act 1919	The Public Libraries Act, 1919.	In section four, subsection (3).
11 & 12 Geo. 5. c. 32	Finance Act 1921	The Finance Act, 1921.	Section sixty-one.
12 & 13 Geo. 5. c. 14	Audit (Local Authorities, &c.) Act 1922	The Audit (Local Authorities, &c.) Act, 1922.	The whole act.
15 & 16 Geo. 5. c. 14	Housing Act 1925	The Housing Act, 1925.	In section ninety-five, subsection (2).
17 & 18 Geo. 5. c. 14	Poor Law Act 1927	The Poor Law Act, 1927.	In section one hundred and fifty-four, subsections (2) and (3), so far as unrepealed. Section one hundred and fifty-five so far as unrepealed.
17 & 18 Geo. 5. c. 31	Audit (Local Authorities) Act 1927	The Audit (Local Authorities) Act, 1927.	Sections two and three.
20 & 21 Geo. 5. c. 17	Poor Law Act 1930	The Poor Law Act, 1930.	In section one hundred and thirty-six, in subsection (1), paragraph (f). Section one hundred and fifty-six.
20 & 21 Geo. 5. c. 23	Mental Treatment Act 1930	The Mental Treatment Act, 1930.	In section six, in subsection (3), in paragraph (e) the words "or joint exercise of."
20 & 21 Geo. 5. c. 44	Land Drainage Act 1930	The Land Drainage Act, 1930.	In section forty-nine, in subsection (3), the words from "in like manner" to the end of the subsection.
22 & 23 Geo. 5. c. 25	Finance Act 1932	The Finance Act, 1932.	Section thirty.
23 & 24 Geo. 5. c. 28	Municipal Corporations (Audit) Act 1933	The Municipal Corporations (Audit) Act, 1933.	The whole act.

== Subsequent developments ==
Consolidation of acts related to children and young persons was first proposed by the Law Commission in their first programme on consolidation and statute law revision, published on 17 November 1965, however this was halted on the publication of the Redcliffe-Maud report of the Royal Commission on Local Government in England 1966–1969.

In their second programme on consolidation and statute law revision, published on 20 April 1971, the Commission proposed that following the passage of government proposals on local government finance, they should progress with the consolidation.

The act was amended by the Local Government Act 1958 (6 & 7 Eliz. 2. c. 55). The local authorities as defined in the act, with the exception of rural parishes, were abolished in 1974, by the Local Government Act 1972, when most of the act was repealed.

Parts of the act still have currency, however. For example, many council byelaws now in force are made under section 249 of the act.
