= Local Government Act 1948 =

Act of the Parliament of the United Kingdom

Local Government Act 1948 (Note: Section 148(1).)
- Act of Parliament
- Parliament of the United Kingdom
- Long title: An Act to amend the law relating to Exchequer grants to local authorities and other bodies and grants by local authorities to other local authorities or other bodies, and the law relating to rating, valuation for rating and precepts to rating authorities; to provide for payments for the benefit of local authorities by the British Transport Commission, the British Electricity Authority and the North of Scotland Hydro-Electric Board; to amend the Railway Freight Rebates Enactments, 1929 to 1943, section two hundred and eleven of the Local Government (Scotland) Act, 1947, the law relating to the payment of expenses and other allowances to members of local authorities and other bodies and the law relating to the manner in which certain securities of local authorities and other bodies may be transferred; to extend the powers of local authorities in certain respects; and for purposes connected with the matters aforesaid.
- Citation: 11 & 12 Geo. 6. c. 26
- Territorial extent: England and Wales; Scotland; (Note: Section 148(2).)

Dates
- Royal assent: 24 March 1948
- Commencement: 24 March 1948 (Note: But see section 147.)
Other legislation
Amends	War Memorials (Local Authorities' Powers) Act 1923; See § Repealed enactments
Repeals/revokes	See § Repealed enactments
Amended by	Rating and Valuation (Scotland) Act 1952; Rating and Valuation Act 1957; Electricity Act 1957; Housing (Financial Provisions) Act 1958; Local Government Act 1958; Highways Act 1959; Statute Law Revision Act 1959; Distress for Rates Act 1960; London Government Act 1963; Local Government Act 1966; Local Government (Scotland) Act 1966; General Rate Act 1967; Pensions (Increase) Act 1971; Statute Law (Repeals) Act 1975; Statute Law (Repeals) Act 1976; Statute Law (Repeals) Act 1978; Statute Law (Repeals) Act 1989; Local Government etc. (Scotland) Act 1994; Local Government and Rating Act 1997; Access to Justice Act 1999; Greater London Authority Act 1999; Crime and Courts Act 2013

Status: Amended

Text of statute as originally enacted

Revised text of statute as amended

Text of the Local Government Act 1948 as in force today (including any amendments) within the United Kingdom, from legislation.gov.uk.

The Local Government Act 1948 (11 & 12 Geo. 6. c. 26) is an act of the Parliament of the United Kingdom. It was passed during the Labour government of Clement Attlee.

This act provided for general unearmarked grants to be provided to local authorities "as nearly as possible on the basis of financial need." It established Exchequer Equalisation Grants (EEG) as the new block grant for local authorities. As noted by Ken Young and Nirmala Rao, these new grants were based on "the ratio between the average rateable value per head in each local authority and the average rateable value per head throughout the country." The purpose of the EEG formula was to ensure that no local authority would fall below a national minimum of financial resources.

Section 132 of the act allowed local authorities to spend up to the product of a 6d rate for the provision of music, drama, entertainment, and other cultural endeavours. According to Janet Minihan,

"Section 132 at last eliminated the need for special enabling legislation and gave local authorities uniform opportunities to encourage cultural activities throughout their districts."

== Provisions ==
=== Repealed enactments ===
Section 147(1) of the act repealed 79 enactments, listed in parts I, II, III, IV and V of the second schedule to the act, respectively.

Part I - consequential upon parts I and II of the act
Citation	Short title	Extent of repeal
19 & 20 Geo. 5. c. 17	Local Government Act 1929	Sections eighty-six to ninety-two, ninety-four to one hundred, one hundred and three and one hundred and four; in section one hundred and five the words "Subject to the provisions of this Part of this Act" and the words "of General or Additional Exchequer Grant of"; sections one hundred and six to one hundred and twelve; proviso (a) to subsection (2) of section one hundred and thirty-one; section one hundred and thirty-five; and the Fourth and Fifth Schedules.
19 & 20 Geo. 5. c. 25	Local Government (Scotland) Act 1929	Sections fifty-three to sixty-three and sixty-five to seventy-one, seventy-three and seventy-eight; and the Seventh and Eighth Schedules.
23 & 24 Geo. 5. c. 8	Local Government (General Exchequer Contributions) Act 1933	The whole act.
23 & 24 Geo. 5. c. 51	Local Government Act 1933	Paragraph (b) of subsection (1) of section one hundred and fifty-two and the Fifth Schedule.
1 Edw. 8 & 1 Geo. 6. c. 22	Local Government (Financial Provisions) Act 1937	The whole act.
1 Edw. 8 & 1 Geo. 6. c. 29	Local Government (Financial Provisions) (Scotland) Act 1937	The whole act.
3 & 4 Geo. 6. c. 13	Old Age and Widows' Pensions Act 1940	Section sixteen.
4 & 5 Geo. 6. c. 33	Local Government (Financial Provisions) Act 1941	The whole act.
4 & 5 Geo. 6. c. 45	Local Government (Financial Provisions) (Scotland) Act 1941	The whole act.
9 & 10 Geo. 6. c. 24	Local Government (Financial Provisions) Act 1946	The whole act.
9 & 10 Geo. 6. c. 25	Local Government (Financial Provisions) (Scotland) Act 1946	The whole act.
9 & 10 Geo. 6. c. 81	National Health Service Act 1946	In section fifty-three, in subsection (1), the words from "and the grant shall be payable" to the end of the subsection, and the whole of subsections (3) and (4).
10 & 11 Geo. 6. c. 27	National Health Service (Scotland) Act 1947	In section fifty-three in subsection (1), the words from "and the grant shall be payable" to the end of the subsection and the whole of subsections (4) and (5).
10 & 11 Geo. 6. c. 43	Local Government (Scotland) Act 1947	Section one hundred and forty-two.

Part II - consequential upon part III of the act
Citation	Short title	Extent of repeal
17 Geo. 2. c. 3	Poor Rate Act 1743	The whole act.
6 & 7 Will. 4. c. 96	Parochial Assessments Act 1836	The whole act.
11 & 12 Vict. c. 110	Poor Law Amendment Act 1848	The whole act.
13 & 14 Vict. c. 101	Poor Law Amendment Act 1850	The whole act.
25 & 26 Vict. c. 103	Union Assessment Committee Act 1862	The whole act.
27 & 28 Vict. c. 39	Union Assessment Committee Amendment Act 1864	The whole act, except sections six and thirteen.
30 & 31 Vict. c. 102	Representation of the People Act 1867	Section seven.
31 & 32 Vict. c. 122	Poor Law Amendment Act 1868	Section twenty-eight.
32 & 33 Vict. c. 41	Poor Rate Assessment and Collection Act 1869	In section thirteen, the words "the valuation lists and"; section seventeen; and, in section eighteen, the words "with the allowance of the rate by the justices".
32 & 33 Vict. c. 67	Valuation (Metropolis) Act 1869	Sections six to forty-four; in section forty-five, the words from "shall be deemed to have been duly made" to "incorporated herewith and" and the words from "and of the fact" to "have been so inserted"; and sections forty-six to fifty, and fifty-five to seventy-four.
38 & 39 Vict. c. 33	Metropolis Management Act 1875	Sections two to four.
44 & 45 Vict. c. 20	Poor Rate Assessment and Collection Act 1869, Amendment Act 1882	Section four.
47 & 48 Vict. c. 5	Valuation (Metropolis) Amendment Act 1884	The whole act.
51 & 52 Vict. c. 41	Local Government Act 1888	Subsection (10) of section forty-two and section forty-four.
7 Edw. 7. c. cxl	City of London (Union of Parishes) Act 1907	Sections fourteen and twenty-nine.
15 & 16 Geo. 5. c. 90	Rating and Valuation Act 1925	Subsection (4) of section one; section five; in subsection (8) of section eleven, the words "and for the purposes of the provisions of Part II of this Act relating to objections, appeals and proposals"; section fourteen; sections sixteen to nineteen; section twenty-three; sections twenty-five to forty-seven; subsections (1) to (3) of section fifty-three; in subsection (1) of section fifty-four, the words "of assessment committees and" and the word "respectively"; in subsection (1) of section fifty-five, the words "assessment committees and county valuation committees", and the words "valuation officers"; section fifty-seven; subsection (4) of section sixty-four; and the First, Fourth and Fifth Schedules.
18 & 19 Geo. 5. c. 8	Rating and Valuation Act 1928	Section four.
18 & 19 Geo. 5. c. 44	Rating and Valuation (Apportionment) Act 1928	Subsection (2) of section one; in subsection (2) of section seven, the definition of "assessment area"; and, in the Second Schedule, sections twenty-nine, thirty, thirty-eight and forty-four.
19 & 20 Geo. 5. c. 17	Local Government Act 1929	Section fifteen; in section eighteen, paragraphs (f) and (h); and section seventy.
20 & 21 Geo. 5. c. 28	Finance Act 1930	Section thirty-two.
22 & 23 Geo. 5. c. 33	Rating and Valuation (No. 2) Act 1932	The whole act.
1 & 2 Geo. 6. c. 19	Rating and Valuation (Postponement of Valuations) Act 1938	The whole act.
1 & 2 Geo. 6. c. 63	Administration of Justice (Miscellaneous Provisions) Act 1938	Subsection (2) of section four.
1 & 2 Geo. 6. c. 65	Rating and Valuation (Air-Raid Works) Act 1938	Subsection (3) of section one.
2 & 3 Geo. 6. c. 40	London Government Act 1939	Paragraph (6) of subsection (2) of section sixty-six and subsection (4) of section sixty-eight.
3 & 4 Geo. 6. c. 12	Rating and Valuation (Postponement of Valuations) Act 1940	The whole act.

Part III - consequential upon part V of this Act
Citation	Short title	Extent of repeal
17 & 18 Vict. c. 91	Lands Valuation (Scotland) Act 1854	In section twenty from the beginning of the section to the words "such companies"; and sections twenty-one and twenty-two.
30 & 31 Vict. c. 80	Valuation of Lands (Scotland) Amendment Act 1867	Sections three and four; and in section nine, the words from "except that," to "items of this Act".
57 & 58 Vict. c. 36	Valuation of Lands (Scotland) Acts Amendment Act 1894	In section two the words from "in place of" where first occurring to "its undertaking".
19 & 20 Geo. 5. c. 17	Local Government Act 1929	In the Eleventh Schedule, subparagraph (2) of paragraph 17.
20 & 21 Geo. 5. c. 24	Railways (Valuation for Rating) Act 1930	Sections one to twenty-one; in section twenty-two, subsections (1) to (3), the proviso to subsection (4), subsections (6) and (8), and subsection (9) except the definition of the expression "Lands Valuation Appeal Court"; section twenty-three; in section twenty-four the words from "and shall be construed," to the end of the section; and the Schedules.
23 & 24 Geo. 5. c. 14	London Passenger Transport Act 1933	Section ninety-two.
1 Edw. 8 & 1 Geo. 6. c. 2	Railway Freight Rebates Act 1936	In sub-paragraph (h) of paragraph 1 of the Schedule, the words from "and at the end of the said paragraph" to the end of the sub-paragraph.
8 & 9 Geo. 6. c. 34	Hydro-Electric Undertakings (Valuation for Rating) (Scotland) Act 1945	The whole act.
9 & 10 Geo. 6. c. 61	Railways (Valuation for Rating) Act 1946	The whole act.
10 & 11 Geo. 6. c. 49	Transport Act 1947	Section thirty-four.

Part IV - consequential upon changes as to Metropolitan Police Fund precepting powers
Citation	Short title	Extent of repeal
10 Geo. 4. c. 44	Metropolitan Police Act 1829	Sections twenty-three to thirty-three.
20 & 21 Vict. c. 64	Metropolitan Police Act 1857	Sections eleven to fourteen.
24 & 25 Vict. c. 124	Metropolitan Police (Receiver) Act 1861	Section seven.
31 & 32 Vict. c. 67	Police Rate Act 1868	The whole act.
32 & 33 Vict. c. 67	Valuation (Metropolis) Act 1869	In section forty-five, the words "the metropolitan police rate".
9 Edw. 7. c. 40	Police Act 1909	Section two.
9 & 10 Geo. 5. c. 46	Police Act 1919	In section seven the words "so much of section twenty-three of the Metropolitan Police Act, 1829, as amended by any subsequent enactment, as limits the annual sum to be provided for the purposes of the metropolitan police and".
15 & 16 Geo. 5. c. 90	Rating and Valuation Act 1925	Subsection (6) of section sixty-four.
19 & 20 Geo. 5. c. 17	Local Government Act 1929	Paragraph 5 of the Tenth Schedule.

Part V - consequential upon other provisions of the act
Citation	Short title	Extent of repeal
15 & 16 Vict. c. 81	County Rates Act 1852	The whole act.
32 & 33 Vict. c. 67	Valuation (Metropolis) Act 1869	In section forty-five, the words "county rate" and the words "the County Rates Act, 1852, and".
29 & 30 Vict. c. 78	County Rate Act 1866	The whole act.
3 Edw. 7. c. 33	Burgh Police (Scotland) Act 1903	In section forty-four, paragraph 3.
7 Edw. 7. c. 53	Public Health Acts Amendment Act 1907	Paragraphs (d), (e) and (h) of subsection (1) of section seventy-six.
15 & 16 Geo. 5. c. 71	Public Health Act 1925	Subsections (1) to (4) of section fifty-six and the proviso to subsection (1) of section seventy.
18 & 19 Geo. 5. c. 8	Rating and Valuation Act 1928	Subsection (i) of section three.
20 & 21 Geo. 5. c. 44	Land Drainage Act 1930	In Part II of the First Schedule, sub-paragraph (b) of paragraph 12.
23 & 24 Geo. 5. c. 51	Local Government Act 1933	In section two hundred and sixty-seven the words "other than a parish council", and section two hundred and ninety-four.
26 Geo. 5 & 1 Edw. 8. c. 49	Public Health Act 1936	The proviso to subsection (1) of section two hundred and twenty-six.
26 Geo. 5 & 1 Edw. 8. c. 50	Public Health (London) Act 1936	The proviso to subsection (1) of section one hundred and seventy-two.
26 Geo. 5 & 1 Edw. 8. c. 51	Housing Act 1936	Subsection (4) of section one hundred and fifteen.
1 Edw. 8 & 1 Geo. 6. c. 36	Local Government (Members' Travelling Expenses) Act 1937	The whole act.
1 Edw. 8 & 1 Geo. 6. c. 46	Physical Training and Recreation Act 1937	In section ten, in subsection (5) the words from "Provided that," to the end of the subsection.
2 & 3 Geo. 6. c. c	London County Council (General Powers) Act 1939	Section seventy-three.
2 & 3 Geo. 6. c. 40	London Government Act 1939	Subsection (4) of section one hundred and seventeen, and section one hundred and sixty-three.
6 & 7 Geo. 6. c. 16	Agriculture (Miscellaneous Provisions) Act 1943	In section seven the words "Sub-paragraph (6) of paragraph 12 of Part II of the First Schedule to the Land Drainage Act, 1930 and", the words "of a Catchment Board", the word "respectively" and the word "each".
9 & 10 Geo. 6. c. 48	Housing (Financial and Miscellaneous Provisions) Act 1946	Subsections (2) and (3) of section eight.
9 & 10 Geo. 6. c. 50	Education Act 1946	Section eleven.
10 & 11 Geo. 6. c. 43	Local Government (Scotland) Act 1947	In section seventy-four in subsection (5) the words from "so however," to the end of the subsection; section three hundred and thirty-eight and the Twelfth Schedule.

== Subsequent developments ==
The act has been substantially repealed piecemeal by subsequent legislation. The Exchequer grant provisions in Parts I and II were superseded by the Local Government Act 1958 (6 & 7 Eliz. 2. c. 55). The valuation and rating provisions in Parts III and IV were largely repealed by the General Rate Act 1967. The allowances provisions in Part VI were repealed by the Local Government Act 1972 and the Local Government (Scotland) Act 1973.

Part I and section 141 of the act were repealed by section 1(1) of, and part VIII of the schedule to, the Statute Law (Repeals) Act 1975, which came into force on 13 March 1975.
