= County Rates Act 1852 =

Act of the Parliament of the United Kingdom

County Rates 1852 (Note: The citation of this act by this short title was authorised by section 1 of, and the first schedule to, the Short Titles Act 1896. Due to the repeal of those provisions it is now authorised by section 19(2) of the Interpretation Act 1978.)
- Act of Parliament
- Parliament of the United Kingdom
- Long title: An Act to consolidate and amend the Statutes relating to the Assessment and Collection of County Rates in England and Wales.
- Citation: 15 & 16 Vict. c. 81
- Territorial extent: England and Wales (Note: Long title.)

Dates
- Royal assent: 30 June 1852
- Commencement: 30 June 1852 (Note: Section 1.)
- Repealed: 24 March 1948
Other legislation
Amends	County Rates Act 1738; Laws Continuance, etc. Act 1739; County Rates Act 1815; County Rates within Boroughs Act 1849
Repeals/revokes	Middlesex County Rates Act 1797; County Rates Act 1816; County Rates (England) Act 1817; County Rates Act 1821; Middlesex County Rates Act 1831; County Rates Act 1834; County Rates Act 1845
Amended by	Rating and Valuation Act 1925; Local Government Act 1933
Repealed by	Local Government Act 1948

Status: Repealed

Text of statute as originally enacted

The County Rates 1852 (15 & 16 Vict. c. 81) was an act of the Parliament of the United Kingdom that consolidated enactments related to county rates in England and Wales.

== Provisions ==
=== Repealed enactments ===
Section 1 of the act repealed 11 enactments, listed in that section, from the passing of the act.

Citation	Short title	Description	Extent of repeal
12 Geo. 2. c. 29	County Rates 1852	An Act passed in the Twelfth Year of the Reign of His late Majesty King George the Second, intituled An Act for the more easy assessing, collecting, and levying of County Rates.	As provides the Mode of assessing and collecting County Rates.
13 Geo. 2. c. 18	Laws Continuance, etc. Act 1739	An Act passed in the Thirteenth Year of His said late Majesty, intituled An Act to continue several Laws therein mentioned, for punishing such Persons as shall wilfully or maliciously pull down or destroy Turnpikes, for repairing Highways, or Locks or other Works erected by Authority ofParliament for making Rivers navigable, and for other Purposes.	As extended the Powers of Justices of the Peace of Counties touching County Rates to the Justices of the Peace of such Liberties and Franchises as have Commissions of the Peace within themselves.
37 Geo. 3. c. 65	Middlesex County Rates Act 1797	An Act passed in the Thirty-seventh Year of the Reign of His late Majesty King George the Third, intituled An Act for empowering the Justices of the Peace for the County of Middlesex, at their General or Quarter Sessions of the Peace, to make fair and equal County Rate for the said County.	The whole act.
55 Geo. 3. c. 51	County Rates Act 1815	An Act passed in the Fifty-fifth Year of the Reign of His said Majesty, intituled An Act to amend an Act of His late Majesty King George the Second, for the more easy assessing, collecting, and levying of County Rates.	Except as to the Provision in the said Act, Clause Seventeen, relating to the Allowance to the County Treasurer.
56 Geo. 3. c. 49	County Rates Act 1816	An Act passed in the Fifty-sixth Year of the Reign of His said Majesty King George the Third, intituled An Act to explain and amend an Act passed in the last Session of Parliament, for the more easy assessing, collecting, and levying of County Rates.	The whole act.
57 Geo. 3. c. 94	County Rates (England) Act 1817	An Act passed in the Fifty-seventh Year of His said late Majesty, intituled An Act to amend an Act of the last Session of Parliament, for the more easy assessing of County Rate.	The whole act.
1 & 2 Geo. 4. c. 85	County Rates Act 1821	An Act passed in the Session of Parliament holden in the First and Second Years of the Reign of His late Majesty King George the Fourth, intituled An Act to explain and amend several Acts relating to the assessing, levying, and collecting the County Rates.	The whole act.
1 Will. 4. c. xlviii	Middlesex County Rates Act 1831	An Act passed in the First Year of the Reign of His late Majesty King William the Fourth, intituled An Act to alter and amend the several Acts now in force for the assessing, collecting, and levying of County Rates, so far as the same relate to the County of Middlesex.	The whole act.
4 & 5 Will. 4. c. 48	County Rates Act 1834	An Act passed in the Session of Parliament holden in the Fourth and Fifth Years of the Reign of His said late Majesty King William the Fourth, intituled an Act to regulate the Expenditure af County Rates and funds in aid thereof.	The whole act.
8 & 9 Vict. c. 111	County Rates Act 1845	An Act passed in the Session of Parliament holden in the Eighth and Ninth Years of the Reign of Her present Majesty Queen Victoria, intituled An Act to amend the Laws relating to the assessing of County Rates.	The whole act.
12 & 13 Vict. c. 65	County Rates within Boroughs Act 1849	An Act passed in the Session of Parliament held in the Twelfth and Thirteenth Years of Her Majesty, intituled An Act to provide more convenient Mode of levying and collecting County Rates, County Police Rates, and District Police Rates in Parishes situated partly within and partly without the Limits of Boroughs which are not liable to such Rates.	As provided that the Overseers of Parishes or Places separately maintaining its own Poor, and divided in the Manner in the said Act mentioned, should collect the County Rates leviable on the Part of the Parish or Place not comprised within the Borough.

== Subsequent developments ==
The whole act was repealed by repealed by section 147(1) of, and part V of the second schedule to, the Local Government Act 1948 (11 & 12 Geo. 6. c. 26), which came into force on 24 March 1948.
