= Union Chargeability Act 1865 =

Act of the Parliament of the United Kingdom

Union Chargeability Act 1865 (Note: Section 17.)
- Act of Parliament
- Parliament of the United Kingdom
- Long title: An Act to provide for the better Distribution of the Charge for the Relief of the Poor in Unions.
- Citation: 28 & 29 Vict. c. 79
- Territorial extent: United Kingdom

Dates
- Royal assent: 29 June 1865
- Commencement: 25 March 1866 (Note: Section 1.)
- Repealed: 1 October 1927
Other legislation
Amends	Poor Law Amendment Act 1834
Amended by	Statute Law Revision Act 1875; Rating and Valuation Act 1925
Repealed by	Poor Law Act 1927
Relates to	Poor Law Amendment Act 1834

Status: Repealed

Text of statute as originally enacted

The Union Chargeability Act 1865 (28 & 29 Vict. c. 79) was an act of the Parliament of the United Kingdom that was passed after the Poor Law Amendment Act 1834 (4 & 5 Will. 4. c. 76). The intention of the act was to broaden the base of funding for relief provided by the Poor Laws.

== History ==
Following the passage of the new poor law in 1834 problems emerged with the financing of the relief for the poor provided in that act.

Although the intention of the New Poor Law was to aggregate parishes into unions among which financial burden of building expensive workhouses was pooled, liability to the union was based on the composition of the parish. Some parishes were able to escape financial liability by organizing into "close" parishes with a minimum of labourer-residents. In this way, the financial burden of the poor fell mainly on "open" parishes.

The act was thus passed so that the financial burden of paupers was shared more equally on a union-wide basis.

The debate was contentious, with complaints centred around the issues of settlement and removal. A proposal was made to reduce the requirements to be given relief in a place where the labourer had lived, rather than removing them to their prior place of domicile. This was deemed unacceptable, as it was claimed the poor would travel to large cities in order to avail themselves of relief. Removal of these proposed amendments finally allowed the bill to be passed on 15 May 1865.

== Subsequent developments ==
The whole act was repealed by section 245(1) of, and the eleventh schedule to, Poor Law Act 1927 (17 & 18 Geo. 5. c. 14), which came into force on 1 October 1927.
