= Divided Parishes and Poor Law Amendment Act 1882 =

Act of the Parliament of the United Kingdom

Divided Parishes and Poor Law Amendment Act 1882 (Note: Section 1.)
- Act of Parliament
- Parliament of the United Kingdom
- Long title: An Act to amend the Divided Parishes and Poor Law Amendment Act, 1876; and for other purposes.
- Citation: 45 & 46 Vict. c. 58
- Territorial extent: United Kingdom

Dates
- Royal assent: 18 August 1882
- Commencement: 18 August 1882 (Note: The Acts of Parliament (Commencement) Act 1793.)
- Repealed: 1 June 1934
Other legislation
| Amends | Divided Parishes and Poor Law Amendment Act 1876 |
| Amended by | Statute Law Revision Act 1883; Local Government Act 1894; Poor Law Act 1927 |
| Repealed by | Local Government Act 1933 |

Status: Repealed

Text of statute as originally enacted

Divided Parishes and Poor Law Amendment Act 1876 (Note: Section 45.)
- Act of Parliament
- Parliament of the United Kingdom
- Long title: An Act to provide for the better arrangement of divided Parishes and other local areas, and to make sundry amendments in the Law relating to the Relief of the Poor in England.
- Citation: 39 & 40 Vict. c. 61
- Territorial extent: United Kingdom

Dates
- Royal assent: 15 August 1876
- Commencement: 15 August 1876 (Note: The Acts of Parliament (Commencement) Act 1793.)
- Repealed: 1 April 1960
Other legislation
| Amended by | Municipal Corporations Act 1882; Divided Parishes and Poor Law Amendment Act 1882; Representation of the People Act 1918 |
| Repealed by | Statute Law Revision Act 1894; Rating and Valuation Act 1925; Poor Law Act 1927; Local Government Act 1929; Local Government Act 1933; London Government Act 1939; National Assistance Act 1948; Statute Law Revision Act 1950; Distress for Rates Act 1960 |

Status: Repealed

Text of statute as originally enacted

The Divided Parishes and Poor Law Amendment Act 1882 (45 & 46 Vict. c. 58) was an act of the Parliament of the United Kingdom which gave the Local Government Board increased powers relating to dissolving and creating poor law unions.

It followed the similar Divided Parishes and Poor Law Amendment Act 1876 (39 & 40 Vict. c. 61).

== Subsequent developments ==
The whole of the 1876 act, except 1 to 9, 24, 29, 31, 37, 39, 42 and 45, and except section 19 from the beginning of the section to the words "to the contrary notwithstanding," and except the first paragraph of section 21 and of section 24, was repealed by section 245(1) of, and the eleventh schedule to, Poor Law Act 1927 (17 & 18 Geo. 5. c. 14), which came into force on 1 October 1927.

Sections 8, 12, 13 and 14 of the 1882 act were repealed by section 245(1) of, and the eleventh schedule to, Poor Law Act 1927 (17 & 18 Geo. 5. c. 14), which came into force on 1 October 1927.

The whole act was repealed by section 307(1)(b) of, and the fourth part of the eleventh schedule to, the Local Government Act 1933 (23 & 24 Geo. 5. c. 51), which came into force on 1 January 1934.
