= Poor Law Act 1930 =

Act of the Parliament of the United Kingdom

Poor Law Act 1930 (Note: Section 165(1).)
- Act of Parliament
- Parliament of the United Kingdom
- Long title: An Act to consolidate the enactments relating to the relief of the poor in England and Wales.
- Citation: 20 & 21 Geo. 5. c. 17
- Territorial extent: England and Wales (Note: Section 165(3).)

Dates
- Royal assent: 20 March 1930
- Commencement: 1 April 1930 (Note: Section 165(2).)
- Repealed: 5 July 1948 (Note: The National Assistance Act (Appointed Day) Order 1948 (SI 1948/1218).)
Other legislation
| Amends | See § Repealed enactments |
| Repeals/revokes | See § Repealed enactments |
| Amended by | Local Government Act 1933; Law Reform (Married Women and Tortfeasors) Act 1935 |
| Repealed by | National Assistance Act 1948 |

Status: Repealed

Text of statute as originally enacted

The Poor Law Act 1930 (20 & 21 Geo. 5. c. 17) was an act of the Parliament of the United Kingdom that consolidated enactments related to the relief of the poor in England and Wales.

== Provisions ==
=== Repealed enactments ===
Section 164(1) of the act repealed 2 enactments, listed in the fourth schedule to the act.

| Citation | Short title | Extent of repeal |
|---|---|---|
| 17 & 18 Geo. 5. c. 14 | Poor Law Act 1927 | The whole act, except section eight, and except sections six, nine, ten, fourteen, fifteen, sixteen and twenty-seven, so far as those sections are applied by any other enactment, and except subsections (2) and (3) of section one hundred and fifty-four, and section one hundred and fifty-five, so far as they relate to the payment of costs, and except section two hundred and seven. |
| 19 & 20 Geo. 5. c. 17 | Local Government Act 1929 | Section three, so far as it relates to functions discharged under this Act; sections six and seven; subsection (2) of section ten; section seventeen; paragraphs (a), (b), and (c) of section eighteen; and paragraph 21 of the Tenth Schedule, except as respects sub-paragraph (6) thereof. |

== Subsequent developments ==
The whole act was repealed by section 62(3) of, and part I of the seventh schedule to, the National Assistance Act 1948 (11 & 12 Geo. 6. c. 29), which came into operation on 5 July 1948.
