= General Rate Act 1967 =

Act of the Parliament of the United Kingdom

General Rate Act 1967 (Note: Section 119(1).)
- Act of Parliament
- Parliament of the United Kingdom
- Long title: An Act to consolidate certain enactments relating to rating and valuation in England and Wales.
- Citation: 1967 c. 9
- Territorial extent: England and Wales (Note: Section 119(2) and (3).)

Dates
- Royal assent: 22 March 1967
- Commencement: 1 April 1967 (Note: Section 119(4).)
- Repealed: 1 April 1990

Other legislation
- Amends: See § Repealed enactments
- Repeals/revokes: See § Repealed enactments
- Amended by: Ancient Monuments and Archaeological Areas Act 1979; Rates Act 1984
- Repealed by: Local Government Finance Act 1988

Status: Repealed

Text of statute as originally enacted

The General Rate Act 1967 (c. 9) was an act of the Parliament of the United Kingdom that consolidated enactments relating to rating and valuation in England and Wales.

== Provisions ==
=== Repealed enactments ===
Section 117(1) of the act repealed 35 enactments and 7 instruments, listed in parts I and II of schedule 14 to the act, respectively.

Part I – Enactments repealed
Citation	Short title	Extent of repeal
43 Eliz. 1. c. 2	Poor Relief Act 1601	The whole act.
17 Geo. 2. c. 38	Poor Relief Act 1743	The whole act.
41 Geo. 3. c. 23	Poor Rate Act 1801	The whole act.
5 & 6 Will. 4. c. 50	Highway Act 1835	Sections 27 and 33.
5 & 6 Will. 4. c. 50	Highway Act 1835	In section 105, the words "by any rate made under or in pursuance of this Act, or", the words "to the surveyor or surveyors, or", the words "rate shall have been made or", and the words "the making of any rate or".
5 & 6 Will. 4. c. 50	Highway Act 1835	Section 106.
5 & 6 Will. 4. c. 50	Highway Act 1835	In section 107, the words "rate, nor any".
32 & 33 Vict. c. 41 (Note: Incorrectly cited as "33 & 34 Vict. c. 41" in the act.)	Poor Rate Assessment and Collection Act 1869	The whole act.
37 & 38 Vict. c. 54	Rating Act 1874	The whole act.
52 & 53 Vict. c. 27	Advertising Stations (Rating) Act 1889	The whole act.
15 & 16 Geo. 5. c. 90	Rating and Valuation Act 1925	The whole act except sections 2(7), 9(1), 10, 48, 49, 52, 54 and 62(3) and schedules 6 and 7.
15 & 16 Geo. 5. c. 90	Rating and Valuation Act 1925	Section 2(7) from "The assessment" onwards.
18 & 19 Geo. 5. c. 8	Rating and Valuation Act 1928	The whole act.
18 & 19 Geo. 5. c. 44	Rating and Valuation (Apportionment) Act 1928	The whole act.
19 & 20 Geo. 5. c. 17	Local Government Act 1929	Sections 67, 71, 72 and 84.
23 & 24 Geo. 5. c. 51	Local Government Act 1933	Sections 186, 189, 192(1) and 193(7).
1 & 2 Geo. 6. c. 65	Rating and Valuation (Air-Raid Works) Act 1938	The whole act.
2 & 3 Geo. 6. c. 31	Civil Defence Act 1939	Section 69.
11 & 12 Geo. 6. c. 26	Local Government Act 1948	Sections 33, 34, 39 to 48, 49(1), 50 to 53, 55(1), 56, 57(1), 58, 59(2), 60, 61, 63, 64, 66, 67, 69 to 71, 85(1), 86, 87(1), 88(2), 91, 94(2) to (4), 100(1) and (2), 102, 109, 110, 120(3) and 121(4).
11 & 12 Geo. 6. c. 26	Local Government Act 1948	In section 121(5) the words "and the provisions of section nine of the Rating and Valuation Act 1925".
11 & 12 Geo. 6. c. 26	Local Government Act 1948	In section 121(7) the words "notwithstanding subsection (2) of section nine of the Rating and Valuation Act 1925".
11 & 12 Geo. 6. c. 26	Local Government Act 1948	In section 141(1) the words "or Part V".
11 & 12 Geo. 6. c. 26	Local Government Act 1948	Section 143(1)(a).
11 & 12 Geo. 6. c. 26	Local Government Act 1948	Section 144(4) from "Provided that" onwards.
11 & 12 Geo. 6. c. 26	Local Government Act 1948	Section 144(9).
11 & 12 Geo. 6. c. 26	Local Government Act 1948	In schedule 1, paragraphs 1 and 3.
12, 13 & 14 Geo. 6. c. 42	Lands Tribunal Act 1949	In section 1(3)(e) the words "forty-nine".
1 & 2 Eliz. 2. c. 42	Valuation for Rating Act 1953	The whole act.
4 & 5 Eliz. 2. c. 9	Rating and Valuation (Miscellaneous Provisions) Act 1955	The whole act except sections 11 and 17.
5 & 6 Eliz. 2. c. 17	Rating and Valuation Act 1957	The whole act.
5 & 6 Eliz. 2. c. 48	Electricity Act 1957	Part II of schedule 4 so far as it amends the Local Government Act 1948.
6 & 7 Eliz. 2. c. 55	Local Government Act 1958	Sections 9 to 15 and schedule 2.
6 & 7 Eliz. 2. c. 55	Local Government Act 1958	In schedule 8, paragraphs 22 to 26, paragraph 33, and in paragraph 35 the words "23 to" and the words from "except" onwards.
7 & 8 Eliz. 2. c. 25	Highways Act 1959	Section 301.
7 & 8 Eliz. 2. c. 36	Rating and Valuation Act 1959	The whole act.
8 & 9 Eliz. 2. c. 12	Distress for Rates Act 1960	The whole act.
8 & 9 Eliz. 2. c. xxxvi	City of London (Various Powers) Act 1960	Section 35.
8 & 9 Eliz. 2. c. xxxvi	City of London (Various Powers) Act 1960	Section 36(2) so far as it relates to the Poor Relief Act 1743 or the Poor Rate Assessment and Collection Act 1869.
9 & 10 Eliz. 2. c. 45	Rating and Valuation Act 1961	The whole act except sections 12(6) and 29(3) and (4).
10 & 11 Eliz. 2. c. 46	Transport Act 1962	Section 66.
10 & 11 Eliz. 2. c. 58	Pipe-lines Act 1962	Section 41.
1963 c. 33	London Government Act 1963	Section 63(1).
1963 c. 33	London Government Act 1963	Section 63(2) from "being" onwards.
1963 c. 33	London Government Act 1963	Schedule 15 except paragraphs 5(1), 6, 10, 18 and 21.
1963 c. 38	Water Resources Act 1963	Section 122.
1964 c. 42	Administration of Justice Act 1964	Paragraph 26 of schedule 3.
1965 c. 36	Gas Act 1965	Section 3.
1965 c. 56	Compulsory Purchase Act 1965	Section 27(5).
1966 c. 9	Rating Act 1966	Section 1.
1966 c. 9	Rating Act 1966	Sections 3 to 8.
1966 c. 9	Rating Act 1966	Section 10(2)(a).
1966 c. 9	Rating Act 1966	Section 11(1) except for the definitions of "gross rate income", "the Minister", "rate", "rating authority" and "year".
1966 c. 9	Rating Act 1966	Section 11(2).
1966 c. 42	Local Government Act 1966	Sections 6, 16 to 26.
1966 c. 42	Local Government Act 1966	In section 40(3), the figures "24".
1966 c. 42	Local Government Act 1966	Section 43(2)(c).
1966 c. 42	Local Government Act 1966	Schedules 2 and 4.
1966 c. 42	Local Government Act 1966	In schedule 5, paragraph 3.
1966 c. 42	Local Government Act 1966	In schedule 6, part III.

Part II – Revocations of, or in, statutory instruments
Citation	Title	Extent of revocation
SI 1962/1687	Gas Boards (Rateable Values) Order 1962	The whole order.
SI 1962/1688	Electricity Boards (Rateable Values) Order 1962	The whole order.
SI 1962/2016	Rating of Owners Order 1962	The whole order.
SI 1963/1361	Rating (Charitable Institutions) Order 1963	The whole order.
SI 1964/254	Transport Boards (Adjustment of Payments) Order 1964	Article 4.
SI 1965/1726	Rating (Charitable Institutions) Order 1965	The whole order.
SI 1966/198	Rating (Charitable Institutions) Order 1966	The whole order.

== Subsequent developments ==
The whole act was repealed by section 117(1) of the Local Government Finance Act 1988, which came into force on 1 April 1990.
