= Pauper Inmates Discharge and Regulation Act 1871 =

Act of the Parliament of the United Kingdom

Pauper Inmates Discharge and Regulation Act 1871 (Note: Section 1.)
- Act of Parliament
- Parliament of the United Kingdom
- Long title: An Act to regulate and control the Discharge of Paupers from Workhouses and Wards provided for the Casual Poor.
- Citation: 34 & 35 Vict. c. 108
- Territorial extent: England and Wales (Note: Section 2.)

Dates
- Royal assent: 21 August 1871
- Commencement: 21 August 1871 (Note: The Acts of Parliament (Commencement) Act 1793.)
- Repealed: 1 October 1927
Other legislation
Repealed by	Poor Law Act 197
Relates to	Children Act 1908

Status: Repealed

Text of statute as originally enacted

The Pauper Inmates Discharge and Regulation Act 1871 (34 & 35 Vict. c. 108), sometimes called the Pauper Inmates Discharge and Regulations Act 1871, was an act of the Parliament of the United Kingdom which related to the Poor Law system. The act stated that if a pauper had not left a workhouse in the past month then it was possible to detain him for 24 hours after he had given notice that he wished to leave, however the period of detention increased for the inmates who left more than twice in the past two months could be detained for 72 hours.

There's no evidence that this stopped paupers from discharging themselves furiously although it limited the number of times they could leave in one week. Potentially the strongest discipline against these paupers was the guardian's increasing powers to take their children away from them, especially after the Children Act 1908 (8 Edw. 7. c. 67), but guardians who cared more about economy rarely adopted this strategy unless the children were abused physically or neglected.

== Subsequent developments ==
The whole act was repealed by section 245(1) of, and the eleventh schedule to, Poor Law Act 1927 (17 & 18 Geo. 5. c. 14), which came into force on 1 October 1927.

== Bibliography ==
- Paterson, William (ed). "Pauper Inmates Discharge and Regulation Act". The Practical Statutes of the Session 1871. Horace Cox. London. 1871. Pages 294 to 300.
