= Poor Relief Act 1795 =

Act of the Parliament of Great Britain

Poor Relief Act 1795 (Note: The citation of this act by this short title was authorised by section 1 of, and the first schedule to, the Short Titles Act 1896. Due to the repeal of those provisions it is now authorised by section 19(2) of the Interpretation Act 1978.)
- Act of Parliament
- Parliament of Great Britain
- Long title: An Act for the better Relief of the Poor, within the several Hundreds, Towns, and Districts, in that Part of Great Britain called England, incorporated by divers Acts of Parliament for the Purpose of the better Maintenance and Employment of the Poor; and for enlarging the Powers of the Guardians of the Poor, within the said several Hundreds, Towns, and Districts, as to the Assessments to be made upon the several Parishes, Hamlets, and Places, within their respective Hundreds, Towns, and Districts, for the Support and Maintenance of the Poor.
- Citation: 36 Geo. 3. c. 10
- Territorial extent: Great Britain

Dates
- Royal assent: 18 December 1795
- Commencement: 18 December 1795 (Note: Section 1.)
- Repealed: 1 October 1927
Other legislation
Repealed by	Poor Law Act 1927

Status: Repealed

Text of statute as originally enacted

The Poor Relief Act 1795 (36 Geo. 3. c. 10) was an act of the Parliament of Great Britain.

The act enabled guardians of an incorporated district to raise and regulate the poor relief assessments in specified parishes. The assessments would be made according to the price of wheat in Mark Lane, as the previous assessments (the Act claimed) "by reason of the late very great increase of the price of corn, and other necessary articles of life, [are] insufficient for the necessary relief and maintenance of the poor". The act also stipulated that "the sums to be assessed in any parish shall never exceed in any one year the amount of double the sum at present raised".

== Subsequent developments ==
The whole act was repealed by section 245(1) of, and the eleventh schedule to, Poor Law Act 1927 (17 & 18 Geo. 5. c. 14), which came into force on 1 October 1927.
