= Metropolitan Houseless Poor Act 1864 =

Act of the Parliament of the United Kingdom

Metropolitan Houseless Poor Act 1864 (Note: Section 8.)
- Act of Parliament
- Parliament of the United Kingdom
- Long title: An Act to make Provision for distributing the Charge of Relief of certain Classes of poor Persons over the whole of the Metropolis.
- Citation: 27 & 28 Vict. c. 116
- Territorial extent: United Kingdom

Dates
- Royal assent: 29 July 1864
- Commencement: 30 September 1864 (Note: Section 1.)
- Expired: 23 March 1865 (Note: Section 6.)
- Repealed: 1 October 1927
Other legislation
Amended by	Metropolitan Houseless Poor Act 1865
Repealed by	Poor Law Act 1927
Relates to	Poor Law Amendment Act 1834

Status: Repealed

Text of statute as originally enacted

Metropolitan Houseless Poor Act 1865 (Note: Section 6.)
- Act of Parliament
- Parliament of the United Kingdom
- Long title: An Act to make the Metropolitan Houseless Poor Act perpetual.
- Citation: 28 & 29 Vict. c. 34
- Territorial extent: United Kingdom

Dates
- Royal assent: 2 June 1865
- Commencement: 2 June 1865 (Note: The Acts of Parliament (Commencement) Act 1793.)
- Repealed: 1 October 1927
Other legislation
Amends	Metropolitan Houseless Poor Act 1864
Amended by	Statute Law Revision Act 1875
Repealed by	Poor Law Act 1927
Relates to	Poor Law Amendment Act 1834

Status: Repealed

Text of statute as originally enacted

The Metropolitan Houseless Poor Act 1864 (27 & 28 Vict. c. 116) was an act of the Parliament of the United Kingdom that imposed a legal obligation on Poor Law unions in London to provide temporary accommodation for "destitute wayfarers, wanderers, and foundlings". The Metropolitan Board of Works was given limited authority to reimburse the unions for the cost of building the necessary casual wards, an arrangement that was made permanent the following year by the passage of the Metropolitan Houseless Poor Act 1865 (28 & 29 Vict. c. 34).

Most provincial Poor Law unions followed London's example, and by the 1870s, of the 643 then in existence, 572 had established casual wards for the reception of vagrants.

== Subsequent developments ==
The whole act was repealed by section 245(1) of, and the eleventh schedule to, Poor Law Act 1927 (17 & 18 Geo. 5. c. 14), which came into force on 1 October 1927.

== Bibliography ==
- Green, David R. (2010), Pauper Capital: London and the Poor Law, 1790–1870, Ashgate Publishing, ISBN 978-0-7546-9903-3
- Higginbotham, Peter (2012), The Workhouse Encyclopedia (ebook), The History Press, ISBN 978-0-7524-7719-0
