= Local Government Act 1929 =

Act of the Parliament of the United Kingdom

Local Government Act 1929 (Note: Section 138(1).)
- Act of Parliament
- Parliament of the United Kingdom
- Long title: An Act to amend the law relating to the administration of poor relief, registration of births, deaths, and marriages, highways, town planning and local government; to extend the application of the Rating and Valuation (Apportionment) Act, 1928, to hereditaments in which no persons are employed; to grant complete or partial relief from rates in the case of the hereditaments to which that Act applies; to discontinue certain grants from the Exchequer and provide other grants in lieu thereof; and for purposes consequential on the matters aforesaid.
- Citation: 19 & 20 Geo. 5. c. 17
- Territorial extent: England and Wales (Note: Section 138(2).)

Dates
- Royal assent: 27 March 1929
- Commencement: 1 April 1930 (Note: Section 134.)
Other legislation
Amends	Divided Parishes and Poor Law Amendment Act 1876; Local Government Act 1894
Amended by	Poor Law Act 1930; Land Drainage Act 1930; Town and Country Planning Act 1932; Local Government Act 1933; Tithe Act 1936; Public Health Act 1936; Public Health (London) Act 1936; Food and Drugs Act 1938; Local Government Act 1948; National Assistance Act 1948; Agricultural Holdings Act 1948; Representation of the People Act 1949; Diseases of Animals Act 1950; Births and Deaths Registration Act 1953; Registration Service Act 1953; Highways Act 1959; Land Drainage Act 1961; London Government Act 1963; Local Government Act 1966; General Rate Act 1967; Courts Act 1971; Statute Law (Repeals) Act 1974; Statute Law (Repeals) Act 1975; Statute Law (Repeals) Act 1976; Statute Law (Repeals) Act 1989; Statute Law (Repeals) Act 1993; Statute Law (Repeals) Act 2004
Relates to	Local Government (Scotland) Act 1929

Status: Amended

Text of statute as originally enacted

Revised text of statute as amended

Text of the Local Government Act 1929 as in force today (including any amendments) within the United Kingdom, from legislation.gov.uk.

The Local Government Act 1929 (19 & 20 Geo. 5. c. 17) is an act of the Parliament of the United Kingdom that made changes to the Poor Law and local government in England and Wales.

The act abolished the system of poor law unions in England and Wales and their boards of guardians, transferring their powers to local authorities. It also gave county councils increased powers over highways, and made provisions for the restructuring of urban and rural districts as more efficient local government areas.

== Poor Law reform ==
Under the act all boards of guardians for poor law unions were abolished, with responsibility for public assistance transferred to public assistance committees of county councils and county boroughs. The local authorities took over infirmaries and fever hospitals, while the workhouses became public assistance institutions. Later legislation was to remove these functions from the control of councils to other public bodies: the National Assistance Board and the National Health Service.

The Metropolitan Asylums Board was also abolished, and the London County Council became responsible for its institutions.

== Highways ==
County councils gained increased powers as the ultimate highway authority for all roads in the county. They acquired direct responsibility for all roads in the charge of rural district councils, as well as retaining control of roads classified by the Ministry of Transport. Urban district councils continued to be in charge of unclassified roads in their areas.

== Adjusting local government areas ==
The act sought to solve a problem that had arisen in the existing scheme of local government, with administrative counties divided into many small urban and rural districts. Some urban districts had a population of just a few hundred and did not have the resources to deliver modern local government services. Similarly, there were a number of rural districts created in 1894 that had small and irregular areas. There were also a few areas where parishes in one county were administered by a rural district council in another.

=== County review schemes and orders ===
Section 46 of the act provided for a review of districts in each administrative county in England and Wales, with a view to forming more effective areas for administrative purposes. The process involved the putting forward of a scheme by the county council to which objections or representations could be made before an order was made by the Minister of Health. All county councils were required to finalise schemes by 1 April 1932, although the period could be extended at the minister's discretion. The final submission was by Cheshire County Council on 1 July 1935.

The first orders under the act were made in 1932, and in November 1936 Robert Hudson, Parliamentary Secretary to the Minister of Health, was able to report that the process was nearly completed. The last order, affecting districts in the West Riding of Yorkshire, came into effect on 1 April 1938. In the counties of Radnorshire and Rutland no changes were made to the existing structure.

The effects of the review orders made in the period 1932–1938 on the county districts was as follows:

- 189 boroughs extended
- 206 urban districts abolished and 49 created (a net decrease of 159)
- 236 rural districts abolished and 67 created (a net decrease of 169)

The act did not allow for the abolition of municipal boroughs, so a number of small boroughs continued in existence. This power was later incorporated in the Local Government Act 1958.

At the same time as reorganising rural districts, many parishes within them were also amalgamated.

It was originally envisioned that reviews would be carried out every ten years, but the intervention of the Second World War and legislation in 1945 creating a Local Government Boundary Commission meant that there were no further large scale changes in administrative areas until the period 1965–1968.

== Subsequent developments ==
Section 79(1) of the act was repealed by section 64(2) of, and part I of schedule 6 to, the Criminal Justice Act 1972, which came into force on 30 March 1974.

== See also ==
- Administrative county
- Local Government Act 1888
- Local Government Act 1894
