= Vestries Act 1850 =

Act of the Parliament of the United Kingdom

Vestries Act 1850 (Note: The citation of this act by this short title was authorised by section 1 of, and the first schedule to, the Short Titles Act 1896. Due to the repeal of those provisions it is now authorised by section 19(2) of the Interpretation Act 1978.)
- Act of Parliament
- Parliament of the United Kingdom
- Long title: An Act to prevent the holding of Vestry or other Meetings in Churches, and for regulating the Appointment of Vestry Clerks.
- Citation: 13 & 14 Vict. c. 57
- Territorial extent: England and Wales (Note: Section 1.)

Dates
- Royal assent: 5 August 1850
- Commencement: 5 August 1850
- Repealed: 1 April 1965
Other legislation
| Amended by | Statute Law Revision Act 1875; Local Government Act 1894; Representation of the People Act 1918; Rating and Valuation Act 1925 |
| Repealed by | Local Government Act 1933; London Government Order 1965 |

Status: Repealed

Text of statute as originally enacted

The Vestries Act 1850 (13 & 14 Vict. c. 57) was an act of the Parliament of the United Kingdom to regulate the local government of parishes in England and Wales.

The vestry of a parish could resolve to request the Poor Law Board (later updated to Local Government Board) to order provision of suitable accommodation within a year of the order so that vestry meetings could take place outside of the parish church. A paid vestry clerk could be appointed using a similar mechanism.

== Subsequent developments ==
The whole act was repealed except for London by section 307(1)(b) of, and the fourth part of the eleventh schedule to, the Local Government Act 1933 (23 & 24 Geo. 5. c. 22).

The whole act was repealed by article 3(24) of, and schedule 1 to, the London Government Order 1965, which came into force on 1 April 1965. The 1965 order was made pursuant to the London Government Act 1963.
