= Rating and Valuation Act 1925 =

Act of the Parliament of the United Kingdom

Rating and Valuation Act 1925 (Note: Section 70(3).)
- Act of Parliament
- Parliament of the United Kingdom
- Long title: An Act to simplify and amend the law with respect to the making and collection of rates by the consolidation of rates and otherwise, to promote uniformity in the valuation of property for the purpose of rates, to amend the law with respect to the valuation of machinery and certain other classes of properties, and for other purposes incidental to or connected with the matters aforesaid.
- Citation: 15 & 16 Geo. 5. c. 90
- Territorial extent: England and Wales (Note: Section 70(1). The act did not extend to Scotland, Northern Ireland, or the administrative county of London.)

Dates
- Royal assent: 22 December 1925
- Commencement: 22 December 1925 (Note: The Acts of Parliament (Commencement) Act 1793.)
Other legislation
Amends	See § Repealed enactments
Repeals/revokes	See § Repealed enactments
Amended by	Rating and Valuation Act (Repeals, etc.) Order 1927; Rating and Valuation Act 1928; Tithe Act 1936; London Government Act 1963; Local Government Act 1966; General Rate Act 1967; Local Government Act 1972; Local Government Finance (Repeals, Savings and Consequential Amendments) Order 1990

Status: Partially repealed

Text of statute as originally enacted

Revised text of statute as amended

Text of the Rating and Valuation Act 1925 as in force today (including any amendments) within the United Kingdom, from legislation.gov.uk.

The Rating and Valuation Act 1925 (15 & 16 Geo. 5. c. 90) is an act of the Parliament of the United Kingdom that consolidated rates and reformed the law relating to the making and collection of rates and the valuation of property for rating purposes in England and Wales.

== Provisions ==
=== Repealed enactments ===
Section 69(1) of the act repealed 46 enactments, listed in the eighth schedule to the act.

Citation	Short title	Extent of repeal
43 Eliz. c. 2	Poor Relief Act 1601	Section one so far as it relates to the appointment of overseers; in section eight the words "the noyacion of overseers"; section nine.
14 Car. 2. c. 12	Poor Relief Act 1662	Section twenty-one so far as it relates to the appointment of overseers.
17 Geo. 2. c. 3	Poor Rate Act 1743	The whole act.
17 Geo. 2. c. 38	Poor Relief Act 1743	Section three.
54 Geo. 3. c. 91	Poor Law (Overseers) Act 1814	The whole act.
54 Geo. 3. c. 170	Poor Relief Act 1814	Section eleven.
59 Geo. 3. c. 12	Poor Relief Act 1819	Sections six and seven.
3 & 4 Will. 4. c. 90	Lighting and Watching Act 1833	In section thirty-three the words from "Provided always" to the words "pay for the purposes of this Act"; and section thirty-four.
5 & 6 Will. 4. c. 50	Highway Act 1835	In section twenty-seven the words from "and provided also" to the end of the section; sections twenty-eight, twenty-nine, thirty-one, thirty-two, thirty-four, thirty-six to forty.
6 & 7 Will. 4. c. 96	Parochial Assessments Act 1836	The whole act.
3 & 4 Vict. c. 88	County Police Act 1840	Section four.
7 & 8 Vict. c. 101	Poor Law Amendment Act 1844	Sections twenty-two and sixty-two.
10 & 11 Vict. c. 34	Towns Improvement Clauses Act 1847	Sections one hundred and seventy-six and one hundred and seventy-seven.
11 & 12 Vict. c. 91	Poor Law Audit Act 1848	Sections one, two, and eleven.
11 & 12 Vict. c. 110	Poor Law Amendment Act 1848	Section seven.
12 & 13 Vict. c. 8	Poor Law (Overseers) Act 1849	The whole act.
12 & 13 Vict. c. 103	Poor Law Amendment Act 1849	Section six.
13 & 14 Vict. c. 57	Vestries Act 1850	Sections six to nine.
13 & 14 Vict. c. 101	Poor Law Amendment Act 1850	Section seven.
15 & 16 Vict. c. 81	County Rates Act 1852	Sections four to twenty; in section twenty-six the words from "a printed list" to "within the county and"; sections twenty-seven to twenty-nine; in section thirty-two the word "allowed"; sections forty to forty-three.
20 Vict. c. 19	Extra-Parochial Places Act 1857	In section one the words from "and the justices" to the end of the section.
24 & 25 Vict. c. 55	Poor Removal Act 1861	Section ten.
25 & 26 Vict. c. 103	Union Assessment Committee Act 1862	The whole act.
27 & 28 Vict. c. 39	Union Assessment Committee Amendment Act 1864	The whole act except sections six and thirteen.
28 & 29 Vict. c. 79	Union Chargeability Act 1865	Section twelve.
29 & 30 Vict. c. 78	County Rate Act 1866	The whole act.
29 & 30 Vict. c. 113	Poor Law Amendment Act 1866	Sections ten to twelve.
30 & 31 Vict. c. 102	Representation of the People Act 1867	Section seven.
31 & 32 Vict. c. 122	Poor Law Amendment Act 1868	Sections twenty-eight to thirty-two, and sections thirty-eight, thirty-nine and forty.
32 & 33 Vict. c. 41	Poor Rate Assessment and Collection Act 1869	Sections three to six, nine, eleven, thirteen, fourteen, sixteen and seventeen; in section eighteen the words "with the allowance of the rate by the justices," and section twenty.
37 & 38 Vict. c. 54	Rating Act 1874	Section twelve; and in section fifteen the definitions of "valuation list" and "assessment committee".
38 & 39 Vict. c. 55	Public Health Act 1875	In section two hundred and ten, the words from "any such rate" to the end of the section; section two hundred and eleven, except sub-paragraph (c) of paragraph (1) and paragraph (4) thereof; section two hundred and twelve; in section two hundred and eighteen the words "general district rate" or; sections two hundred and nineteen to two hundred and twenty-three and section two hundred and twenty-five except so far as those sections relate to private improvement rates; sections two hundred and thirty and two hundred and thirty-one, and section two hundred and forty-eight.
39 & 40 Vict. c. 61	Divided Parishes and Poor Law Amendment Act 1876	In section six the words "for which an overseer shall be appointed and," and the word "other."
43 & 44 Vict. c. 7	Union Assessment Act 1880	The whole act.
45 & 46 Vict. c. 20	Poor Rate Assessment and Collection Act 1869 Amendment Act 1882	The whole act.
45 & 46 Vict. c. 27	Highway Rate Assessment and Expenditure Act 1882	The whole act, except sections one, two and six.
45 & 46 Vict. c. 50	Municipal Corporations Act 1882	Section one hundred and forty-four, except subsections (1) and (2); section one hundred and forty-five; subsection (1) of section one hundred and forty-six from "on receipt of" to the words "in the borough" where those words secondly occur; subsections (3), (4), (5), and (6) of section one hundred and forty-six; sections one hundred and forty-seven and one hundred and forty-eight; subsection (5) of section one hundred and ninety-seven; in subsection (2) of section one hundred and ninety-eight the words "allowed by two justices usually acting in and for the borough and has been"; section one hundred and ninety-nine, section two hundred and thirty-eight.
51 & 52 Vict. c. 41	Local Government Act 1888	Subsection (2) of section thirty-three.
52 & 53 Vict. c. 63	Interpretation Act 1889	Section five.
53 & 54 Vict. c. 17	Public Health (Rating of Orchards) Act 1890	The whole act.
54 & 55 Vict. c. 33	Allotments Rating Exemption Act 1891	The whole act.
55 & 56 Vict. c. 53	Public Libraries Act 1892	In subsection (1) of section eighteen the words from "and (c) where" to the end of the subsection.
56 & 57 Vict. c. 73	Local Government Act 1894	Subsection (1) and paragraph (a) of subsection (2) of section five; in subsection (1)(c) of section six paragraph (i); in paragraph (5) of section nineteen the words from "The power and" to the words "the parish meeting and"; in subsection (1) of section thirty-three the words from "all or any of" to the words "liabilities of overseers and"; sections thirty-four and fifty; subsection (3) of section eighty-one; in rule 7 of Part I of the First Schedule the words "the appointment of an overseer" and the words "an assistant overseer or"; in rule (3) of Part II of the First Schedule the words "and to appoint the overseers."
59 & 60 Vict. c. 16	Agricultural Rates Act 1896	In section five the words "and in the basis or standard for any county rate and in any valuation made by the council of a borough or any other council for the purpose of raising the borough or other rate"; in section nine the definition of "rateable value."
10 & 11 Geo. 5. c. 17	Increase of Rent and Mortgage Interest (Restrictions) Act 1920	Subsection (1) of section sixteen.
13 & 14 Geo. 5. c. 39	Agricultural Rates Act 1923	In subsection (2) of section six the words from "and section nine" to the end of the subsection, and the substituted definition of rateable value in Part II of the Schedule.

== Subsequent developments ==
Most of the act was repealed by section 117(1) of, and part I of schedule 14 to, the General Rate Act 1967, which came into force on 22 March 1967. Sections 2(7), 9(1), 10, 48, 49, 52, 54 and 62(3), and schedules 6 and 7, were preserved from that repeal. Section 2(7) was subsequently repealed by the Local Government Finance (Repeals, Savings and Consequential Amendments) Order 1990 (SI 1990/776).
