= Workhouse =

Institution for those unable to support themselves

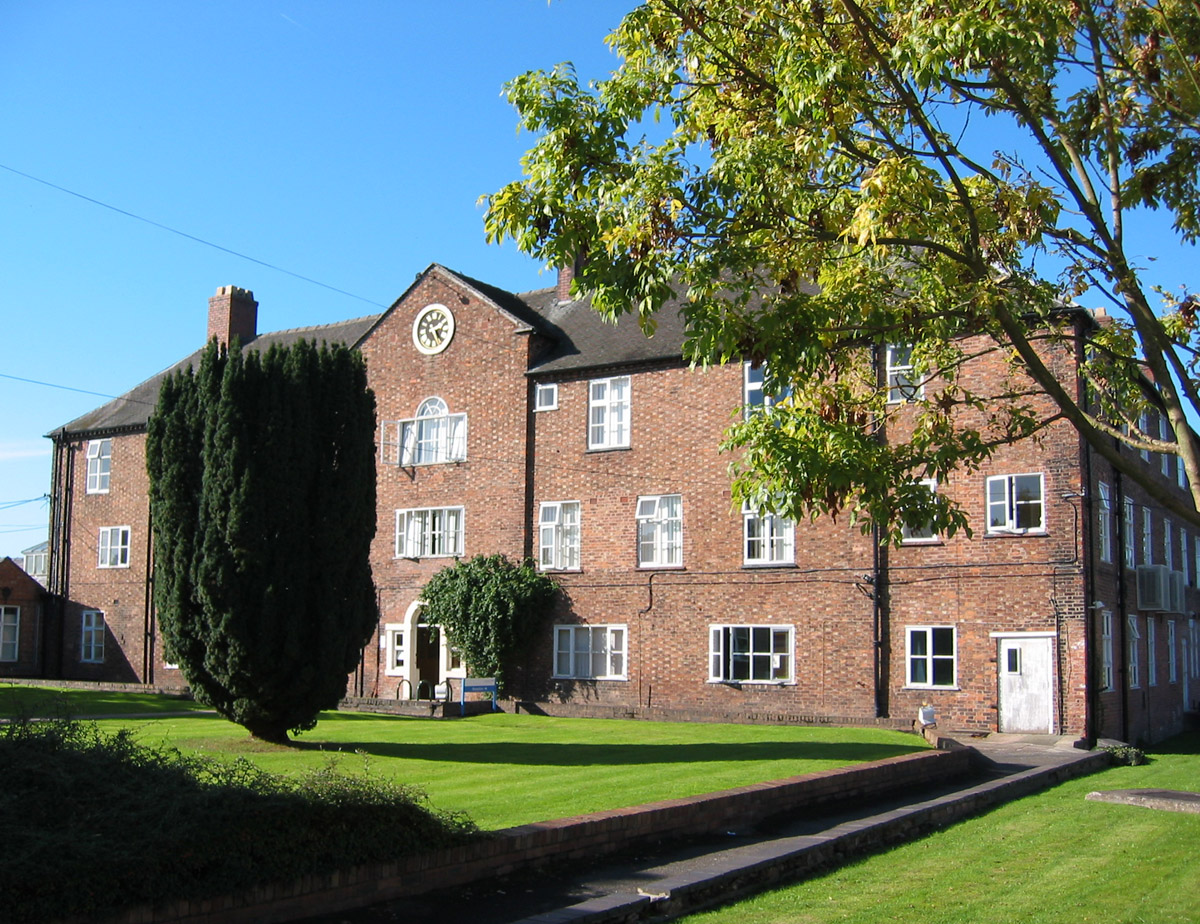
Former workhouse in Nantwich in Cheshire, dating from 1780

In Britain and Ireland, a workhouse (Welsh: tloty, lit. "poor-house") was a total institution where those unable to support themselves financially were offered accommodation and employment. In Scotland, they were usually known as poorhouses. The earliest known use of the term workhouse is from 1631, in an account by the mayor of Abingdon reporting that "we have erected within our borough a workhouse to set poorer people to work".

The origins of the workhouse can be traced to the Statute of Cambridge 1388, which attempted to address the labour shortages following the Black Death in England by restricting the movement of labourers and ultimately led to the state becoming responsible for the support of the poor. However, mass unemployment following the end of the Napoleonic Wars in 1815, the introduction of new technology to replace agricultural workers in particular, and a series of bad harvests, meant that by the early 1830s the established system of poor relief was proving to be unsustainable. The New Poor Law of 1834 attempted to reverse the economic trend by discouraging the provision of relief to anyone who refused to enter a workhouse. Some Poor Law authorities hoped to run workhouses at a profit by utilising the free labour of their inmates. Most were employed on tasks such as breaking stones, crushing bones to produce fertiliser, or picking oakum using a large metal nail known as a spike.

As the 19th century progressed, workhouses increasingly became refuges for the elderly, infirm, and sick rather than the able-bodied poor, and in 1929 legislation was passed to allow local authorities to take over workhouse infirmaries as municipal hospitals. Although workhouses were formally abolished by the same legislation in 1930, many continued under their new appellation of Public Assistance Institutions under the control of local authorities. It was not until the introduction of the National Assistance Act 1948 (11 & 12 Geo. 6. c. 29) that the last vestiges of the Poor Law finally disappeared, and with them the workhouses.

== Legal and social background ==
=== Medieval to Early Modern period ===
The Statute of Cambridge 1388 was an attempt to address the labour shortage caused by the Black Death, a devastating pandemic that killed about one-third of England's population. The new law fixed wages and restricted the movement of labourers, as it was anticipated that if they were allowed to leave their parishes for higher-paid work elsewhere then wages would inevitably rise. According to historian Derek Fraser, the fear of social disorder following the plague ultimately resulted in the state, and not a "personal Christian charity", becoming responsible for the support of the poor. The resulting laws against vagrancy were the origins of state-funded relief for the poor. From the 16th century onwards a distinction was legally enshrined between those who were willing to work but could not, and those who were able to work but would not: between "the genuinely unemployed and the idler". Supporting the destitute was a problem exacerbated by King Henry VIII's dissolution of the monasteries, which began in 1536. They had been a significant source of charitable relief, and provided a good deal of direct and indirect employment. The Poor Act 1575 went on to establish the principle that if the able-bodied poor needed support, they had to work for it.

The Poor Relief Act 1601 made parishes legally responsible for the care of those within their boundaries who, through age or infirmity, were unable to work. The Act essentially classified the poor into one of three groups. It proposed that the able-bodied be offered work in a house of correction (the precursor of the workhouse), where the "persistent idler" was to be punished. It also proposed the construction of housing for the impotent poor, the old and the infirm, although most assistance was granted through a form of poor relief known as outdoor relief – money, food, or other necessities given to those living in their own homes, funded by a local tax on the property of the wealthiest in the parish.

=== Georgian era ===
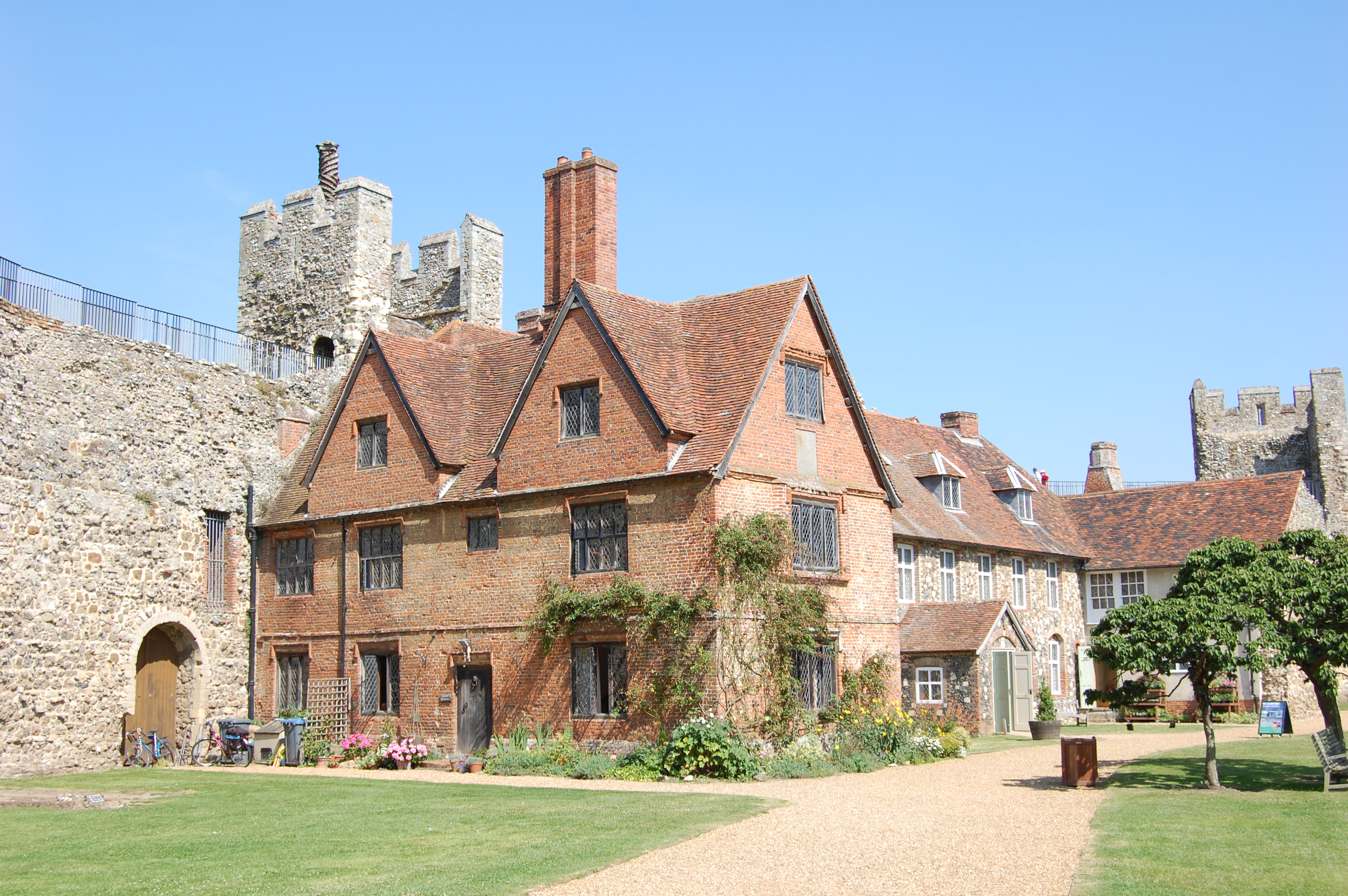
The 'Red House' at Framlingham Castle in Suffolk was founded as a workhouse in 1664.

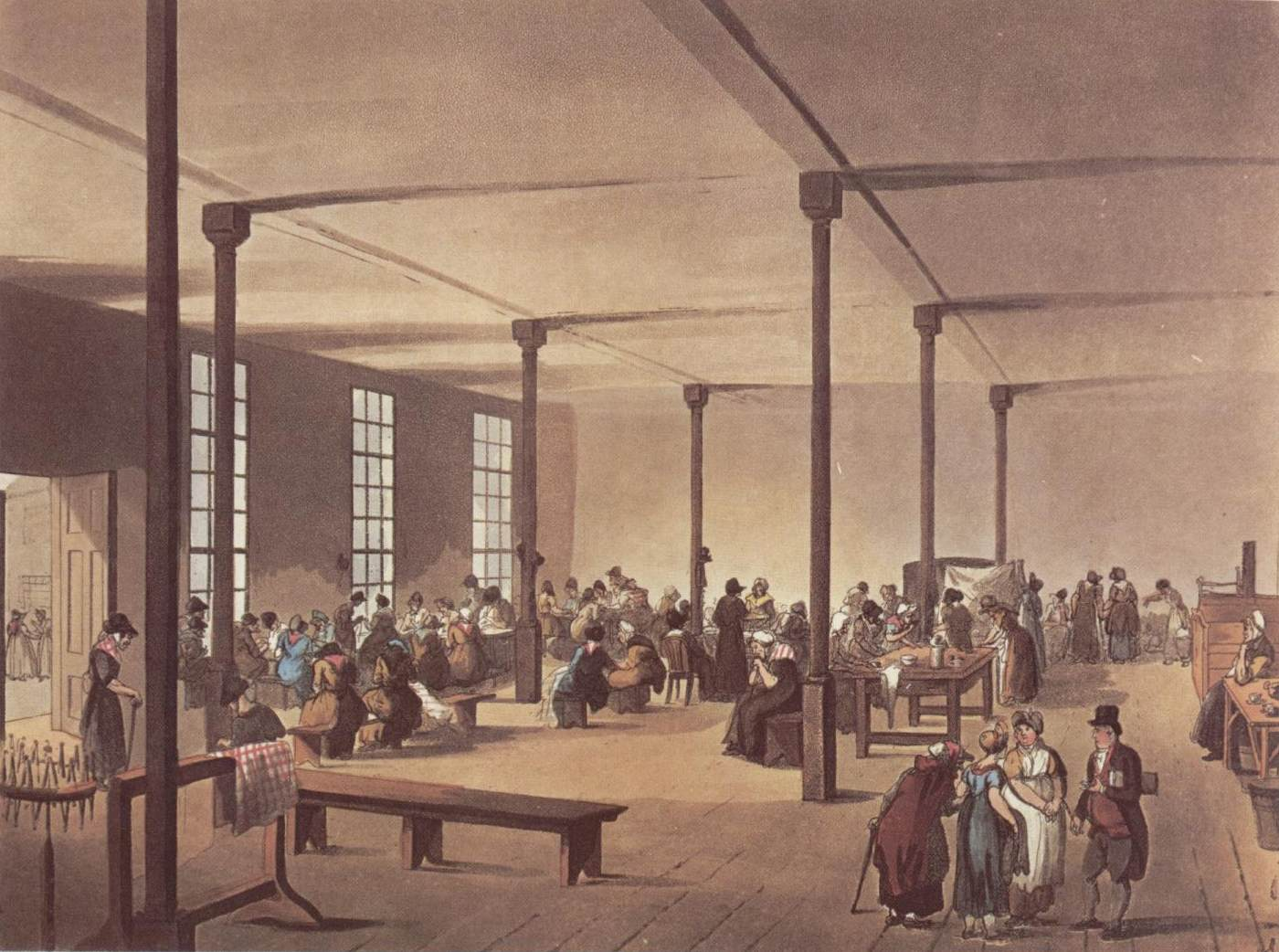
"The workroom at St James's workhouse", from The Microcosm of London (1808)

The workhouse system evolved in the 17th century, allowing parishes to reduce the cost to ratepayers of providing poor relief. The first authoritative figure for numbers of workhouses comes in the next century from The Abstract of Returns made by the Overseers of the Poor, which was drawn up following a government survey in 1776. It put the number of parish workhouses in England and Wales at more than 1800 (about one parish in seven), with a total capacity of more than 90,000 places. This growth in the number of workhouses was prompted by the Workhouse Test Act 1723; by obliging anyone seeking poor relief to enter a workhouse and undertake a set amount of work, usually for no pay (a system called indoor relief), the Act helped prevent irresponsible claims on a parish's poor rate.

The growth was also bolstered by the Relief of the Poor Act 1782, proposed by Thomas Gilbert. Gilbert's Act was intended to allow parishes to share the cost of poor relief by joining together to form unions, known as Gilbert Unions, to build and maintain even larger workhouses to accommodate the elderly and infirm. The able-bodied poor were instead either given outdoor relief or found employment locally. Relatively few Gilbert Unions were set up, but the supplementing of inadequate wages under the Speenhamland system did become established towards the end of the 18th century. So keen were some Poor Law authorities to cut costs wherever possible that cases were reported of husbands being forced to sell their wives, to avoid them becoming a financial burden on the parish. In one such case in 1814 the wife and child of Henry Cook, who were living in Effingham workhouse, were sold at Croydon market for one shilling (5p); the parish paid for the cost of the journey and a "wedding dinner".

By the 1830s most parishes had at least one workhouse, but many were badly managed. In his 1797 work, The State of the Poor, Sir Frederick Eden, wrote:

The workhouse is an inconvenient building, with small windows, low rooms and dark staircases. It is surrounded by a high wall, that gives it the appearance of a prison, and prevents free circulation of air. There are 8 or 10 beds in each room, chiefly of flocks, and consequently retentive of all scents and very productive of vermin. The passages are in great want of whitewashing. No regular account is kept of births and deaths, but when smallpox, measles or malignant fevers make their appearance in the house, the mortality is very great. Of 131 inmates in the house, 60 are children.

Instead of a workhouse, some sparsely populated parishes placed homeless paupers into rented accommodation, and provided others with relief in their own homes. Those entering a workhouse might join anywhere from a handful to several hundred other inmates; for instance, between 1782 and 1794 Liverpool's workhouse accommodated 900–1200 indigent men, women and children. The larger workhouses such as the Gressenhall House of Industry generally served a number of communities, in Gressenhall's case 50 parishes. Writing in 1854, Poor Law commissioner George Nicholls viewed many of them as little more than factories:

These workhouses were established, and mainly conducted, with a view to deriving profit from the labour of the inmates, and not as being the safest means of affording relief by at the same time testing the reality of their destitution. The workhouse was in truth at that time a kind of manufactory, carried on at the risk and cost of the poor-rate, employing the worst description of the people, and helping to pauperise the best.

=== 1834 Act ===
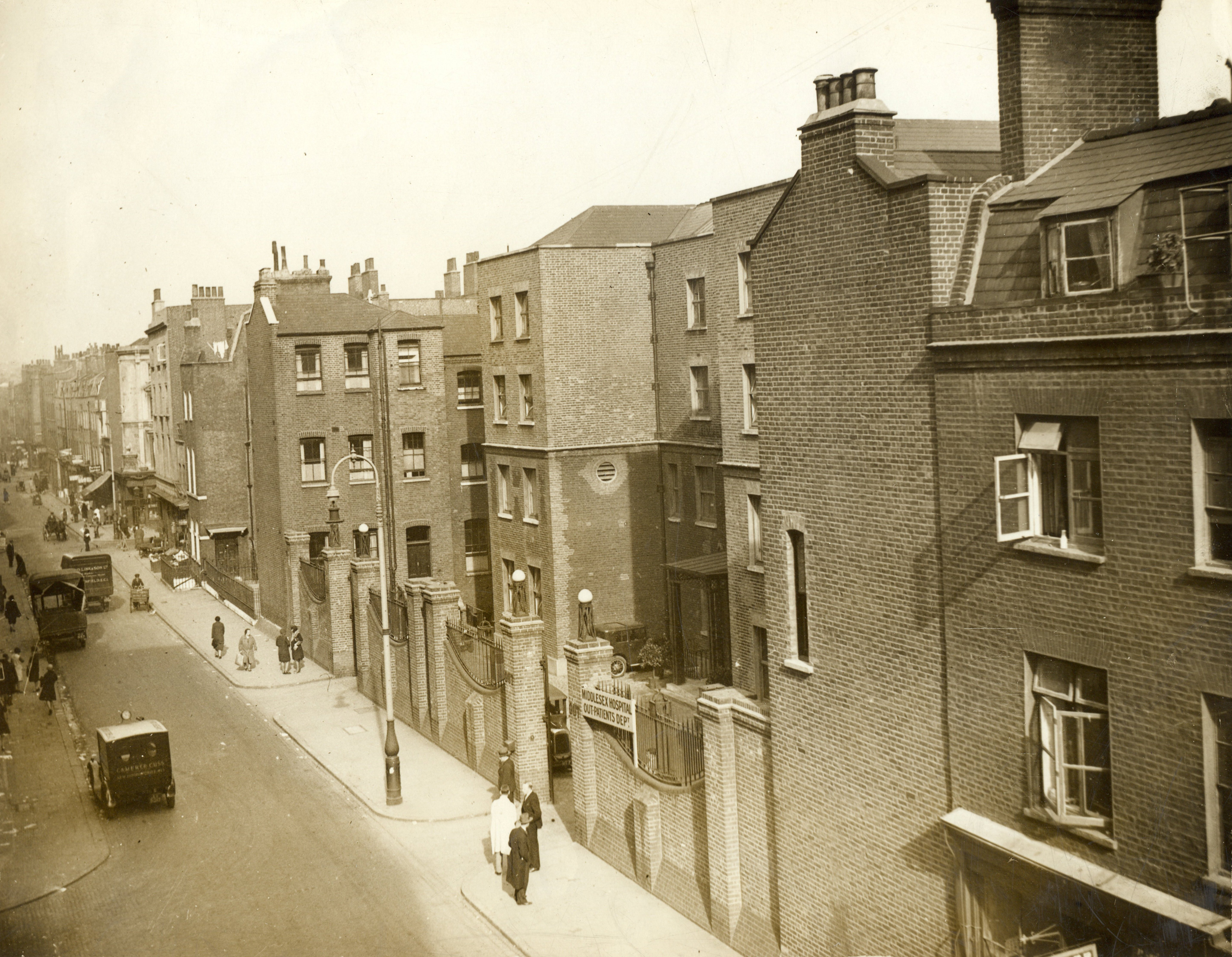
Former Cleveland Street workhouse, London W1, photographed in 1930. It later became part of the Middlesex Hospital.

By 1832 the amount spent on poor relief nationally had risen to £7 million a year, more than 10 shillings (£0.50) per head of population, up from £2 million in 1784. (Note: Britain's gross national income in 1830 was £400 million, of which the £7 million spent on poor relief represents 2%, not a great deal by modern standards according to the historian Trevor May. He further observes that "As poor relief was the only social service provided by the state this might seem to be a small price to pay for saving Britain from the revolution that must have seemed so imminent during the Swing riots.) The large number of those seeking assistance was pushing the system to "the verge of collapse". (Note: It has been estimated that there were 1.5 million paupers in Britain in 1832, about 12% of the population of 13 million.) The economic downturn following the end of the Napoleonic Wars in the early 19th century resulted in increasing numbers of unemployed. Coupled with developments in agriculture that meant less labour was needed on the land, along with three successive bad harvests beginning in 1828 and the Swing Riots of 1830, reform was inevitable.

Many suspected that the system of poor relief was being widely abused. In 1832 the government established a Royal Commission to investigate and recommend how relief could best be given to the poor. The result was the establishment of a centralised Poor Law Commission in England and Wales under the Poor Law Amendment Act 1834, also known as the New Poor Law, which discouraged the allocation of outdoor relief to the able-bodied; "all cases were to be 'offered the house', and nothing else". Individual parishes were grouped into Poor Law Unions, each of which was to have a union workhouse. More than 500 of these were built during the next 50 years, two-thirds of them by 1840. In certain parts of the country there was a good deal of resistance to these new buildings, some of it violent, particularly in the industrial north. Many workers lost their jobs during the major economic depression of 1837, and there was a strong feeling that what the unemployed needed was not the workhouse but short-term relief to tide them over. By 1838, 573 Poor Law Unions had been formed in England and Wales, incorporating 13,427 parishes, but it was not until 1868 that unions were established across the entire country: the same year that the New Poor Law was applied to the Gilbert Unions.

Despite the intentions behind the 1834 Act, relief of the poor remained the responsibility of local taxpayers, and there was thus a powerful economic incentive to use loopholes such as sickness in the family to continue with outdoor relief; the weekly cost per person was about half that of providing workhouse accommodation. (Note: In 1860 the weekly cost of maintaining a pauper in a workhouse in the east of England was 3s 0½d (£0.152) a week, as opposed to 1s 9d (£0.088) a week for outdoor relief.) Outdoor relief was further restricted by the terms of the 1844 Outdoor Relief Prohibitory Order, which aimed to end it altogether for the able-bodied poor. In 1846, of 1.33 million paupers only 199,000 were maintained in workhouses, of whom 82,000 were considered to be able-bodied, leaving an estimated 375,000 of the able-bodied on outdoor relief. Excluding periods of extreme economic distress, it has been estimated that about 6.5% of the British population may have been accommodated in workhouses at any given time. (Note: Official twice-yearly headcounts, taken on 1 January and 1 July, suggest that between 2.5% and 4.5% of the population was accommodated in workhouses at any given time.)

== Early Victorian workhouses ==
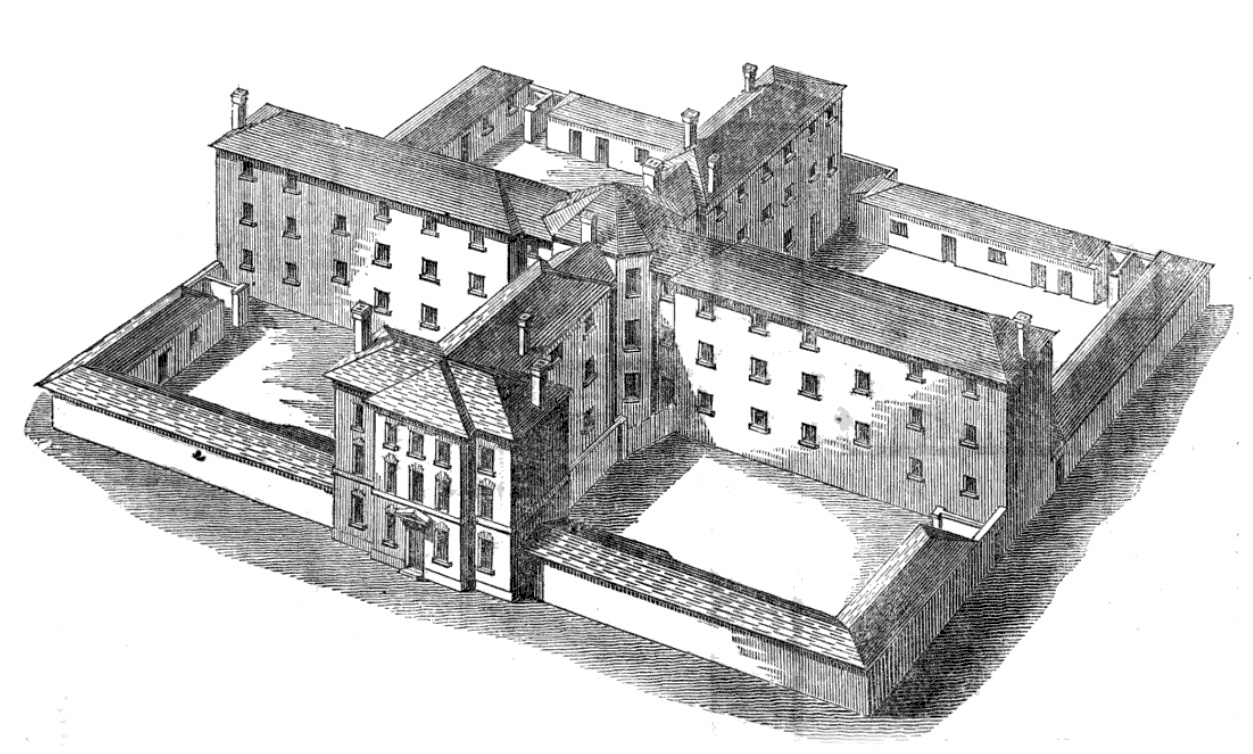
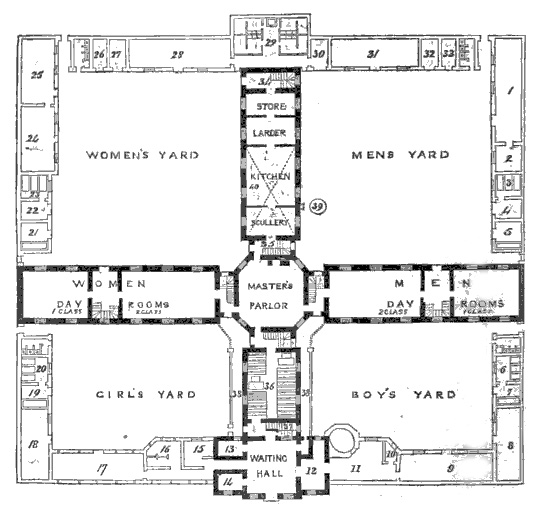
Sampson Kempthorne's cruciform design for a workhouse accommodating 300 paupers

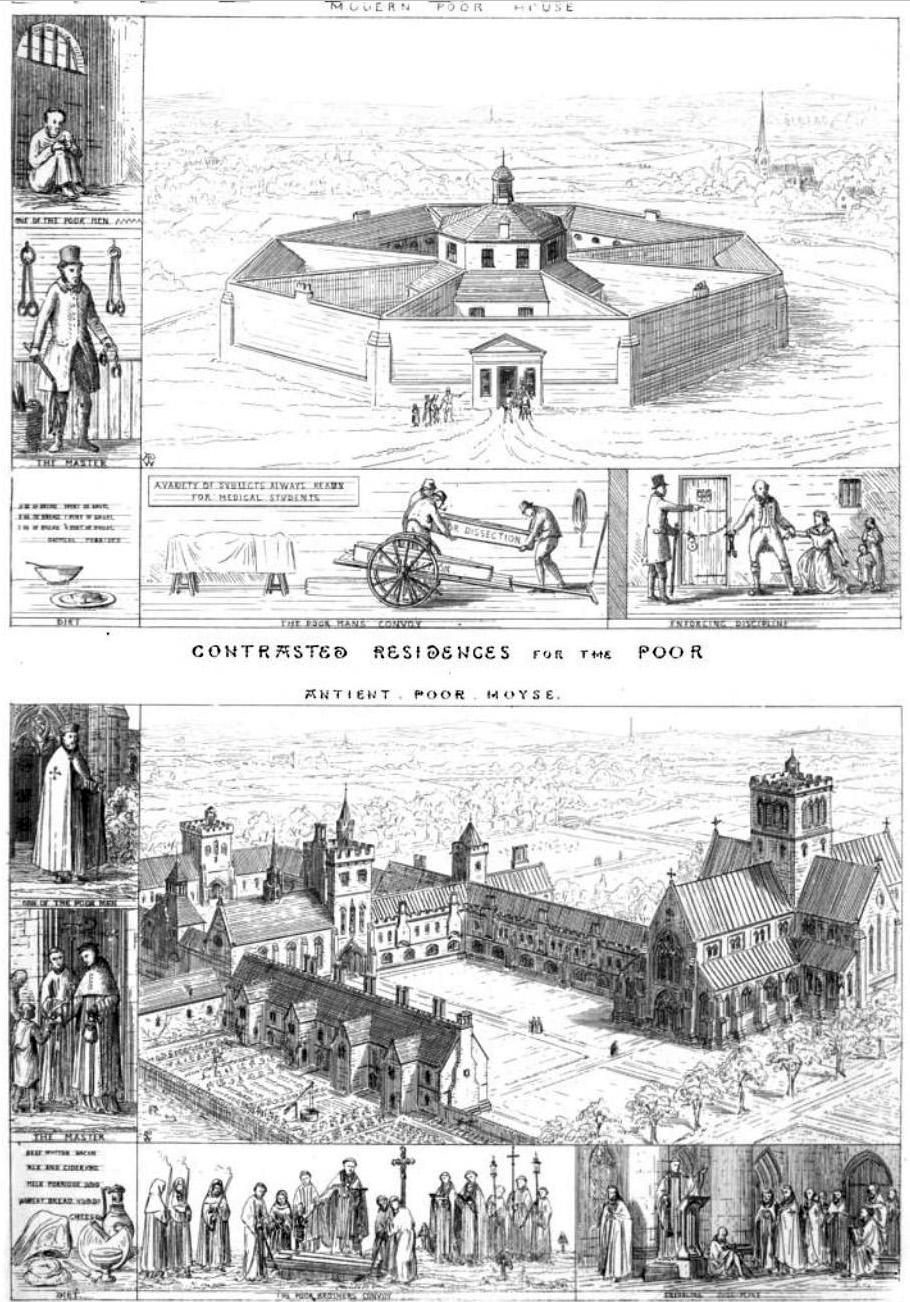
Contrasted Residences for the Poor (1836), by Augustus Pugin. He was critical of Kempthorne's octagonal design shown above.

The New Poor Law Commissioners were very critical of existing workhouses, and generally insisted that they be replaced. They complained in particular that "in by far the greater number of cases, it is a large almshouse, in which the young are trained in idleness, ignorance, and vice; the able-bodied maintained in sluggish sensual indolence; the aged and more respectable exposed to all the misery that is incident to dwelling in such a society".

After 1835 many workhouses were constructed with the central buildings surrounded by work and exercise yards enclosed behind brick walls, so-called "pauper bastilles". The commission proposed that all new workhouses should allow for the segregation of paupers into at least four distinct groups, each to be housed separately: the aged and impotent, children, able-bodied males, and able-bodied females. A common layout resembled Jeremy Bentham's prison panopticon, a radial design with four three-storey buildings at its centre set within a rectangular courtyard, the perimeter of which was defined by a three-storey entrance block and single-storey outbuildings, all enclosed by a wall. That basic layout, one of two designed by the architect Sampson Kempthorne (his other design was octagonal with a segmented interior, sometimes known as the Kempthorne star), allowed for four separate work and exercise yards, one for each class of inmate. Separating the inmates was intended to serve three purposes: to direct treatment to those who most needed it; to deter others from pauperism; and as a physical barrier against illness, physical and mental. The commissioners argued that buildings based on Kempthorne's plans would be symbolic of the recent changes to the provision of poor relief; one assistant commissioner expressed the view that they would be something "the pauper would feel it was utterly impossible to contend against", and "give confidence to the Poor Law Guardians". Another assistant commissioner claimed the new design was intended as a "terror to the able-bodied population", but the architect George Gilbert Scott was critical of what he called "a set of ready-made designs of the meanest possible character". Some critics of the new Poor Law noted the similarities between Kempthorne's plans and model prisons, and doubted that they were merely coincidental - Richard Oastler went as far as referring to the institutions as 'prisons for the poor'. Augustus Pugin compared Kempthorne's octagonal plan with the "antient poor hoyse", in what Felix Driver calls a "romantic, conservative critique" of the "degeneration of English moral and aesthetic values".

By the 1840s some of the enthusiasm for Kempthorne's designs had waned. With limited space in built-up areas, and concerns over the ventilation of buildings, some unions moved away from panopticon designs. Between 1840 and 1870 about 150 workhouses with separate blocks designed for specific functions were built. Typically the entrance building contained offices, while the main workhouse building housed the various wards and workrooms, all linked by long corridors designed to improve ventilation and lighting. Where possible, each building was separated by an exercise yard, for the use of a specific category of pauper.

=== Admission and discharge ===
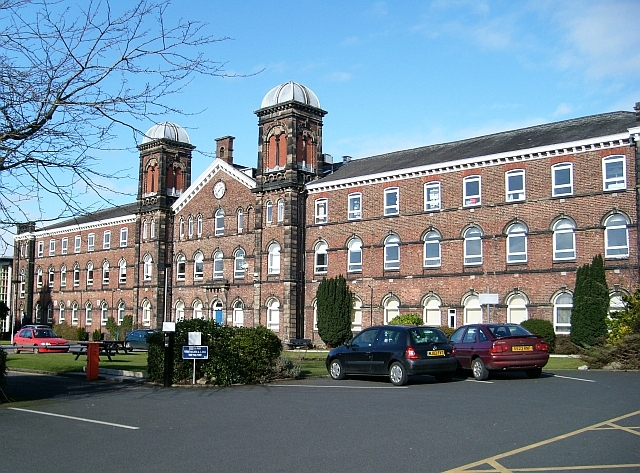
The Carlisle Union Workhouse, opened in 1864, later part of the University of Cumbria

Each Poor Law Union employed one or more relieving officers, whose job it was to visit those applying for assistance and assess what relief, if any, they should be given. Any applicants considered to be in need of immediate assistance could be issued with a note admitting them directly to the workhouse. Alternatively they might be offered any necessary money or goods to tide them over until the next meeting of the guardians, who would decide on the appropriate level of support and whether or not the applicants should be assigned to the workhouse.

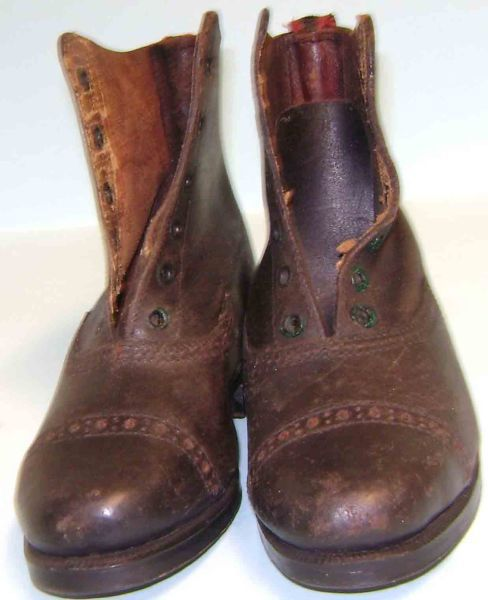
Children's boots issued by Leeds Union Workhouse.

Workhouses were designed with only a single entrance guarded by a porter, through which inmates and visitors alike had to pass. Near to the entrance were the casual wards for tramps and vagrants (Note: The Metropolitan Houseless Poor Act 1864 imposed a legal obligation on Poor Law Unions to provide such temporary accommodation.) and the relieving rooms, where paupers were housed until they had been examined by a medical officer. After being assessed the paupers were separated and allocated to the appropriate ward for their category: boys under 14, able-bodied men between 14 and 60, men over 60, girls under 14, able-bodied women between 14 and 60, and women over 60. (Note: Those were the official categories, but some Poor Law Unions further subdivided those in their care, particularly women: prostitutes, "women incapable of getting their own way from syphilis", and "idiotic or weak-minded women with one or more bastard children".) Children under the age of two were allowed to remain with their mothers, but by entering a workhouse paupers were considered to have forfeited responsibility for their families. Clothing and personal possessions (with the possible exception of spectacles) were usually taken from them and stored, to be returned on their discharge. After bathing, they were issued with a distinctive uniform: (Note: The notion of marking out those in receipt of poor relief by their clothing was enshrined in law by the Poor Act 1697, although the custom dated back to at least the previous century. The 1697 Act required paupers to wear a badge consisting of the letter "P" on their right shoulder, in either red or blue cloth.) for men it might be a striped cotton shirt, jacket and trousers, and a cloth cap, and for women a blue-and-white striped dress worn underneath a smock. Shoes were also provided. In some establishments certain categories of inmate were marked out by their clothing; for example, at Bristol Incorporation workhouse, prostitutes were required to wear a yellow dress and pregnant single women a red dress; such practices were deprecated by the Poor Law Commission in a directive issued in 1839 entitled "Ignominious Dress for Unchaste Women in Workhouses", but they continued until at least 1866. Some workhouses had a separate "foul" or "itch" ward, where inmates diagnosed with skin diseases such as scabies could be detained before entering the workhouse proper. Also not to be overlooked were unfortunate destitute sufferers of mental health disorders, who would be ordered to enter the workhouse by the parish doctor. The Lunacy Act 1853 did promote the asylum as the institution of choice for patients afflicted with all forms of mental illness. However, in reality, destitute people suffering from mental illness would be housed in their local workhouse.

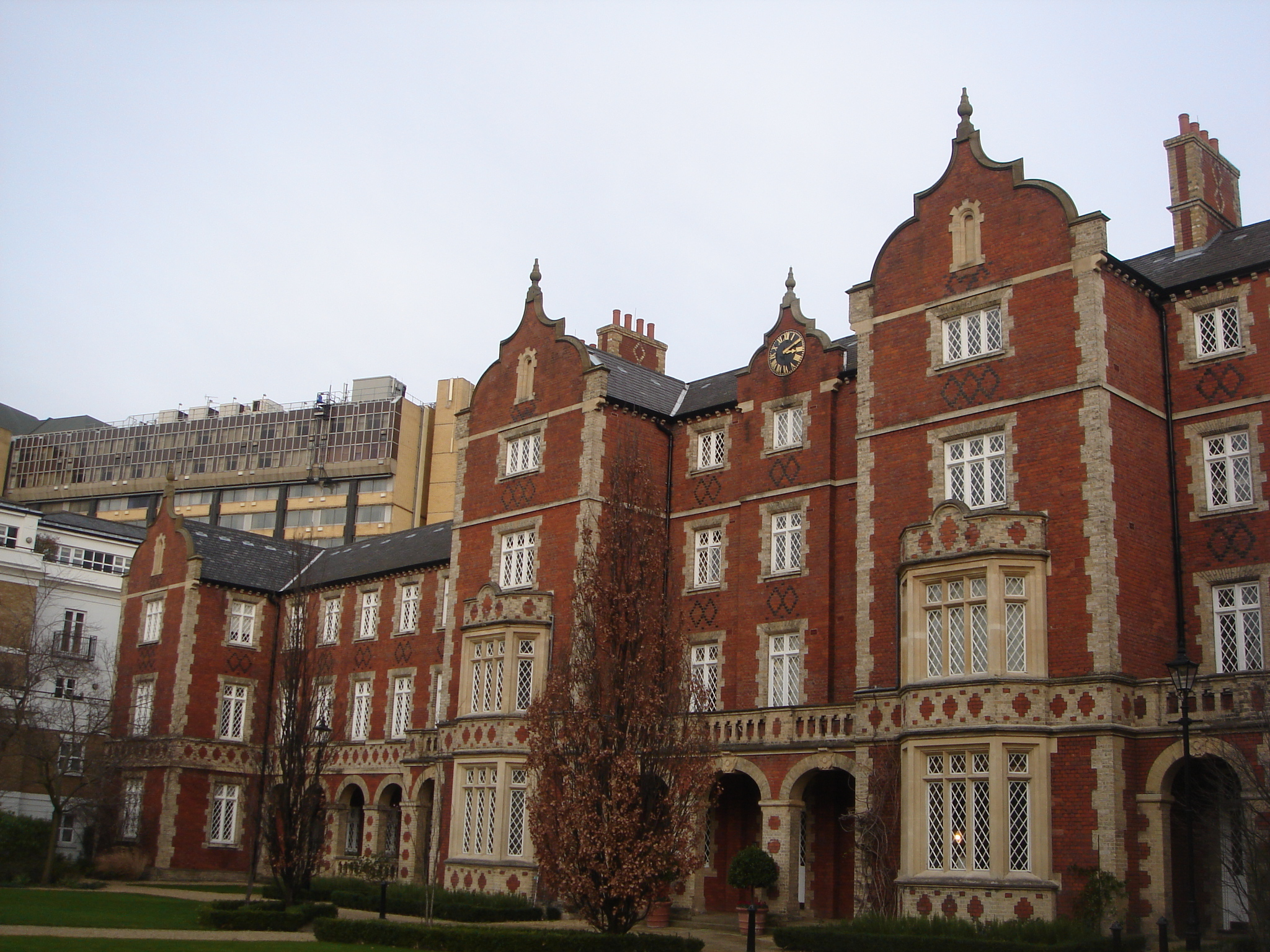
Kensington workhouse in London, which later became part of St Mary Abbots Hospital, and is now housing

Conditions in the casual wards were worse than in the relieving rooms, and deliberately designed to discourage vagrants, who were considered potential troublemakers and probably disease-ridden. Vagrants who presented themselves at the door of a workhouse were at the mercy of the porter, whose decision it was whether or not to allocate them a bed for the night in the casual ward. Those refused entry risked being sentenced to two weeks of hard labour if they were found begging or sleeping in the open and prosecuted for an offence under the Vagrancy Act 1824.

A typical early 19th-century casual ward was a single large room furnished with some kind of bedding and perhaps a bucket in the middle of the floor for sanitation. The bedding on offer could be very basic: the Poor Law authorities in Richmond in London in the mid-1840s provided only straw and rags, although beds were available for the sick. In return for their night's accommodation vagrants might be expected to undertake a certain amount of work before leaving the next day; for instance at Guisborough men were required to break stones for three hours and women to pick oakum, two hours before breakfast and one after. Until the passage of the Casual Poor Act 1882 vagrants could discharge themselves before 11 am on the day following their admission, but from 1883 onwards they were required to be detained until 9 am on the second day. Those who were admitted to the workhouse again within one month were required to be detained until the fourth day after their admission.

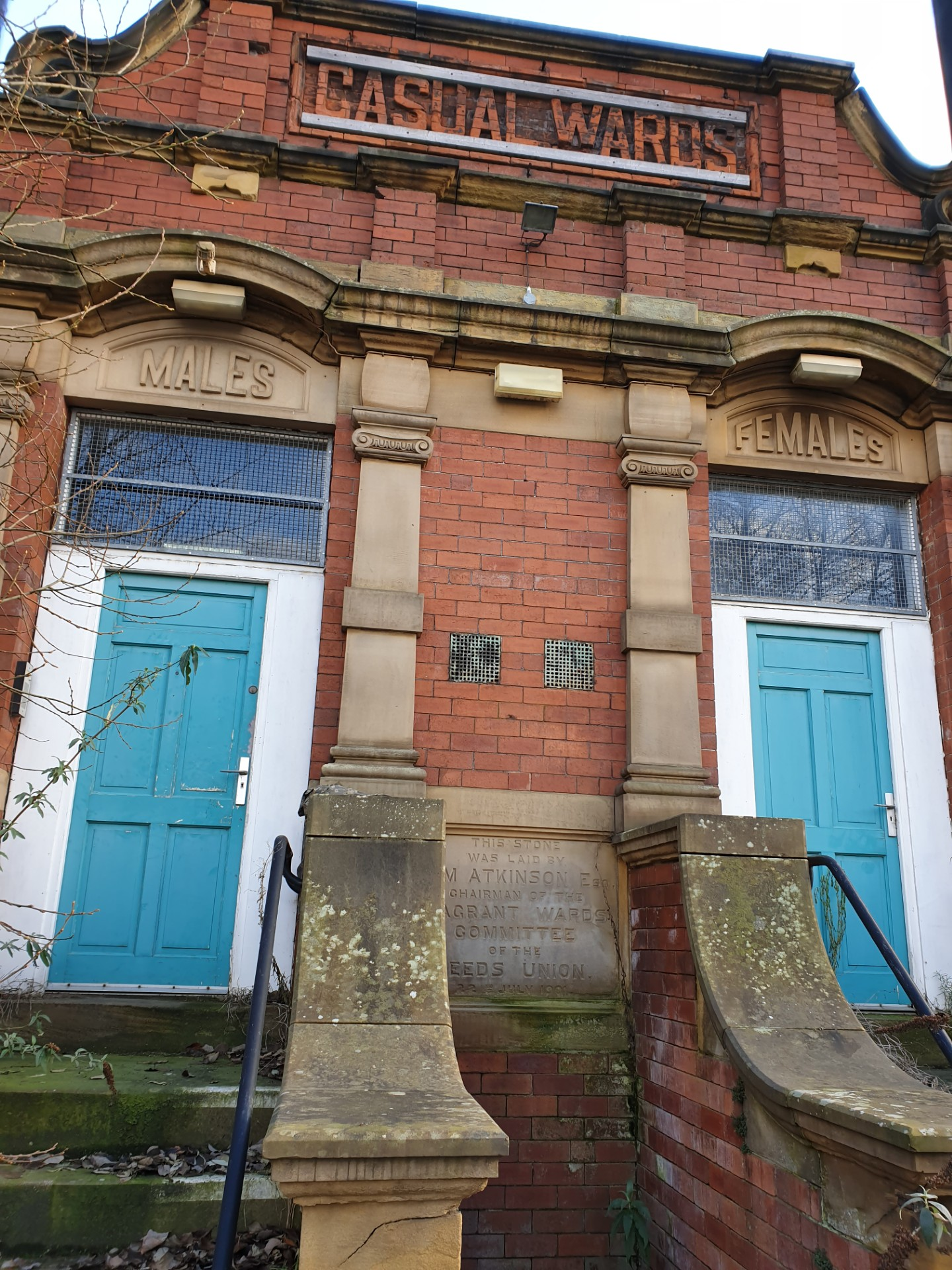
Entrance to casual wards of Leeds Union Workhouse, built in 1901

Inmates were free to leave whenever they wished after giving reasonable notice, generally considered to be three hours, but if a parent discharged him- or herself then the children were also discharged, to prevent them from being abandoned. The comic actor Charlie Chaplin, who spent some time with his mother in Lambeth workhouse, records in his autobiography that when he and his half-brother returned to the workhouse after having been sent to a school in Hanwell, he was met at the gate by his mother Hannah, dressed in her own clothes. Desperate to see them again she had discharged herself and the children; they spent the day together playing in Kennington Park and visiting a coffee shop, after which she readmitted them all to the workhouse.

Available data surrounding death rates within the workhouse system is minimal; however, in the Wall to Wall documentary Secrets from the Workhouse, it is estimated that 10% of those admitted to the workhouse after the 1834 Poor Law Amendment Act died within the system.

=== Work ===
Daily workhouse schedule
5:00–6:00	Rise
6:30–7:00	Breakfast
7:00–12:00	Work
12:00–13:00	Dinner
13:00–18:00	Work
18:00–19:00	Supper
20:00	Bedtime
Sunday was a day of rest. During the winter months inmates were allowed to rise an hour later and did not start work until 8:00.

Some Poor Law authorities hoped that payment for the work undertaken by the inmates would produce a profit for their workhouses, or at least allow them to be self-supporting, but whatever small income could be produced never matched the running costs. In the 18th century, inmates were poorly managed, and lacked either the inclination or the skills to compete effectively with free market industries such as spinning and weaving. Some workhouses operated not as places of employment, but as houses of correction, a role similar to that trialled by Buckinghamshire magistrate Matthew Marryott. Between 1714 and 1722 he experimented with using the workhouse as a test of poverty rather than a source of profit, leading to the establishment of a large number of workhouses for that purpose. Nevertheless, local people became concerned about the competition to their businesses from cheap workhouse labour. As late as 1888, for instance, the Firewood Cutters Protection Association was complaining that the livelihood of its members was being threatened by the cheap firewood on offer from the workhouses in the East End of London.

Many inmates were allocated tasks in the workhouse such as caring for the sick or teaching that were beyond their capabilities, but most were employed on "generally pointless" work, such as breaking stones or removing the hemp from telegraph wires. Workhouses were sometimes colloquially known as 'The Spike', which may derive from the common task of picking oakum using a large metal nail, also known as a spike. Bone-crushing, useful in the creation of fertiliser, was a task most inmates could perform, until a government inquiry into conditions in the Andover workhouse in 1845 found that starving paupers were reduced to fighting over the rotting bones they were supposed to be grinding, to suck out the marrow. The resulting scandal led to the withdrawal of bone-crushing as an employment in workhouses and the replacement of the Poor Law Commission by the Poor Law Board in 1847. Conditions were thereafter regulated by a list of rules contained in the 1847 Consolidated General Order, which included guidance on issues such as diet, staff duties, dress, education, discipline, and redress of grievances.

Some Poor Law Unions opted to send destitute children to the British colonies, in particular to Canada and Australia, where it was hoped the fruits of their labour would contribute to the defence of the empire and enable the colonies to buy more British exports. Known as Home Children, the Philanthropic Farm school alone sent more than 1000 boys to the colonies between 1850 and 1871, many of them taken from workhouses. In 1869 Maria Rye and Annie Macpherson, "two spinster ladies of strong resolve", began taking groups of orphans and children from workhouses to Canada, most of whom were taken in by farming families in Ontario. The Canadian government paid a small fee to the ladies for each child delivered, but most of the cost was met by charities or the Poor Law Unions.

As far as possible, elderly inmates were expected to undertake the same kind of work as the younger men and women, although concessions were made to their relative frailty. Or they might be required to chop firewood, clean the wards, or carry out other domestic tasks. In 1882 Lady Brabazon, later the Countess of Meath, set up a project to provide alternative occupation for non-able-bodied inmates, known as the Brabazon scheme. Volunteers provided training in crafts such as knitting, embroidery and lace making, all costs initially being borne by Lady Brabazon herself. Although slow to take off, when workhouses discovered that the goods being produced were saleable and could make the enterprise self-financing, the scheme gradually spread across the country, and by 1897 there were more than 100 branches.

=== Diet ===
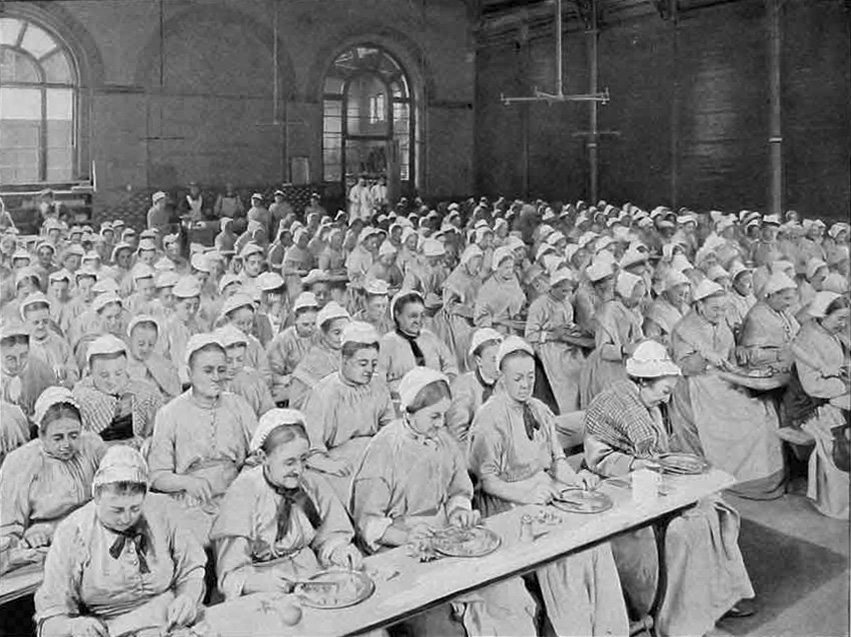
Dinnertime at St Pancras Workhouse, London, 1911

In 1836 the Poor Law Commission distributed six diets for workhouse inmates, one of which was to be chosen by each Poor Law Union depending on its local circumstances. Although dreary, the food was generally nutritionally adequate, and according to contemporary records was prepared with great care. Issues such as training staff to serve and weigh portions were well understood. The diets included general guidance, as well as schedules for each class of inmate. They were laid out on a weekly rotation, the various meals selected on a daily basis, from a list of foodstuffs. For instance, a breakfast of bread and gruel was followed by dinner, which might consist of cooked meats, pickled pork or bacon with vegetables, potatoes, yeast dumpling, soup and suet, or rice pudding. Supper was normally bread, cheese and broth, and sometimes butter or potatoes.

The larger workhouses had separate dining rooms for males and females; workhouses without separate dining rooms would stagger the meal times to avoid any contact between the sexes.

=== Education ===
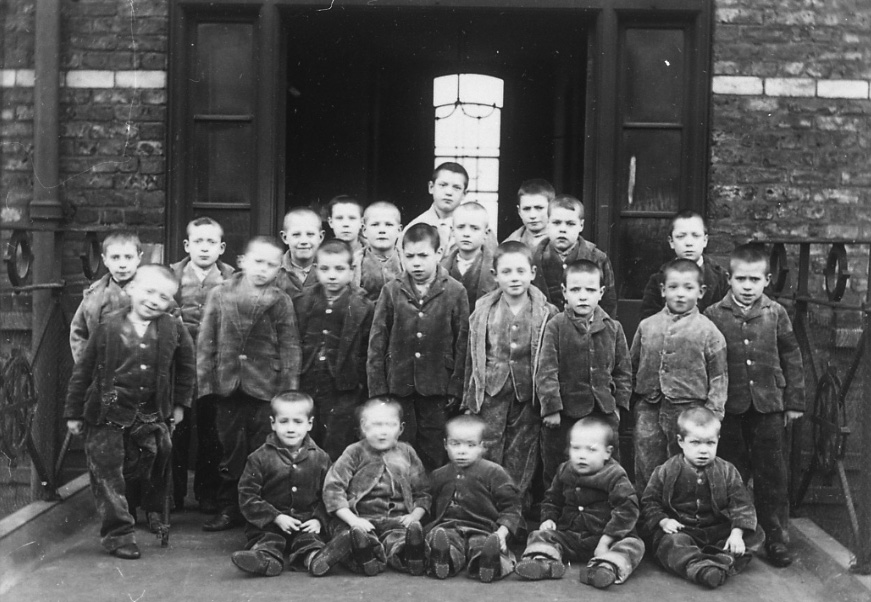
A group of indigent (poor) boys at Crumpsall Workhouse in Manchester, 1895–97

Education was provided for the children, but workhouse teachers were a particular problem. Poorly paid, without any formal training, and facing large classes of unruly children with little or no interest in their lessons, few stayed in the job for more than a few months. In an effort to force workhouses to offer at least a basic level of education, legislation was passed in 1845 requiring that all pauper apprentices should be able to read and sign their own indenture papers. A training college for workhouse teachers was set up at Kneller Hall in Twickenham during the 1840s, but it closed in the following decade.

Some children were trained in skills valuable to the area. In Shrewsbury, the boys were placed in the workhouse's workshop, while girls were tasked with spinning, making gloves and other jobs "suited to their sex, their ages and abilities". At St Martin in the Fields, children were trained in spinning flax, picking hair and carding wool, before being placed as apprentices. Workhouses also had links with local industry; in Nottingham, children employed in a cotton mill earned about £60 a year for the workhouse. Some parishes advertised for apprenticeships, and were willing to pay any employer prepared to offer them. Such agreements were preferable to supporting children in the workhouse: apprenticed children were not subject to inspection by justices, thereby lowering the chance of punishment for neglect; and apprenticeships were viewed as a better long-term method of teaching skills to children who might otherwise be uninterested in work. Supporting an apprenticed child was also considerably cheaper than the workhouse or outdoor relief. Children often had no say in the matter, which could be arranged without the permission or knowledge of their parents. The supply of labour from workhouse to factory, which remained popular until the 1830s, was sometimes viewed as a form of transportation. While getting parish apprentices from Clerkenwell, Samuel Oldknow's agent reported how some parents came "crying to beg they may have their Children out again". Historian Arthur Redford suggests that the poor may have once shunned factories as "an insidious sort of workhouse".

=== Religion ===
From the Jewish point of view ... was the virtual impossibility of complying with the Jewish ritual requirements; the dietary laws could have been followed, if at all, only by virtual restriction to bread and water, and the observance of the Sabbath and Festivities was impossible.

Religion played an important part in workhouse life: prayers were read to the paupers before breakfast and after supper each day. Each Poor Law Union was required to appoint a chaplain to look after the spiritual needs of the workhouse inmates, and he was invariably expected to be from the established Church of England. Religious services were generally held in the dining hall, as few early workhouses had a separate chapel but in some parts of the country, notably Cornwall and northern England, there were more dissenters than members of the established church. As section 19 of the 1834 Poor Law specifically forbade any regulation forcing an inmate to attend church services "in a Mode contrary to [their] Religious Principles", the commissioners were reluctantly forced to allow non-Anglicans to leave the workhouse on Sundays to attend services elsewhere, so long as they were able to provide a certificate of attendance signed by the officiating minister on their return.

As the 19th century wore on non-conformist ministers increasingly began to conduct services within the workhouse, but Catholic priests were rarely welcomed. A variety of legislation had been introduced during the 17th century to limit the civil rights of Catholics, beginning with the Popish Recusants Act 1605 in the wake of the failed Gunpowder Plot that year. Though almost all restrictions on Catholics in England, Scotland, Wales and Ireland were removed by the Roman Catholic Relief Act 1829, a great deal of anti-Catholic feeling remained. Even in areas with large Catholic populations, such as Liverpool, the appointment of a Catholic chaplain was unthinkable. Some guardians went so far as to refuse Catholic priests entry to the workhouse.

=== Discipline ===
Discipline was strictly enforced in the workhouse; for minor offences such as swearing or feigning sickness the "disorderly" could have their diet restricted for up to 48 hours. For more serious offences such as insubordination or violent behavior the "refractory" could be confined for up to 24 hours, and might also have their diet restricted. Girls were punished in the same way as adults but sometimes in older cases girls were also beaten or slapped, but boys under the age of 14 could be beaten with "a rod or other instrument, such as may have been approved of by the Guardians". Children, specifically orphans, who left the grounds without being discharged or ran away from workhouses could be severely disciplined and could be confined with no food or water. The persistently refractory, or anyone bringing "spirituous or fermented liquor" into the workhouse, could be taken before a Justice of the Peace and even gaoled. All punishments handed out were recorded in a punishment book, which was examined regularly by the workhouse guardians, locally elected representatives of the participating parishes with overall responsibility for the running of the workhouse.

=== Management and staffing ===
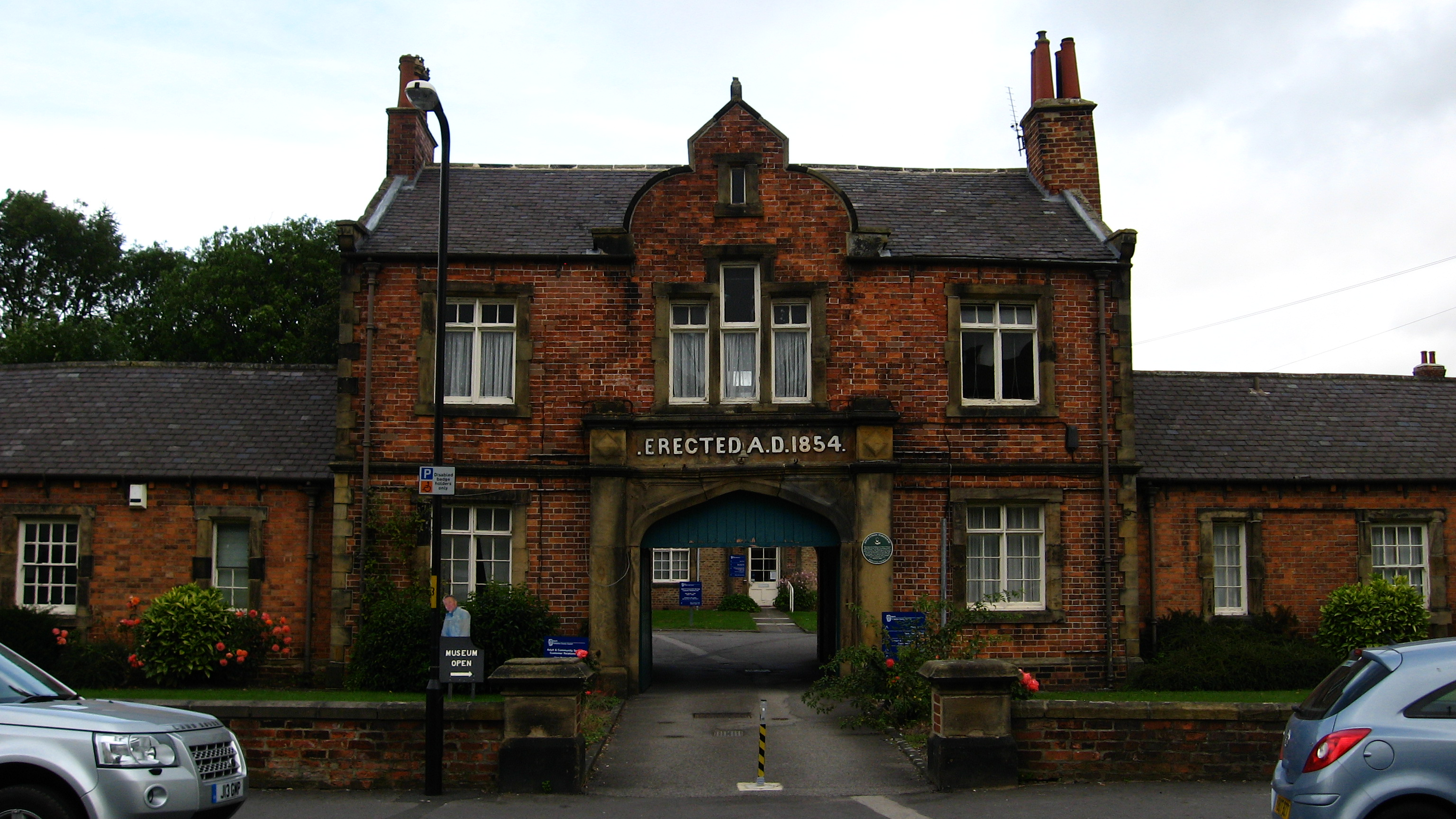
Ripon Union Workhouse, completed in 1855, replaced an earlier Georgian era workhouse. It now houses a museum.

Although the commissioners were responsible for the regulatory framework within which the Poor Law Unions operated, each union was run by a locally elected board of guardians, comprising representatives from each of the participating parishes, assisted by six ex officio members. The guardians were usually farmers or tradesmen, and as one of their roles was the contracting out of the supply of goods to the workhouse, the position could prove lucrative for them and their friends. Simon Fowler has commented that "it is clear that this [the awarding of contracts] involved much petty corruption, and it was indeed endemic throughout the Poor Law system".

Although the 1834 Act allowed for women to become workhouse guardians provided they met the property requirement, the first female was not elected until 1875. Working class guardians were not appointed until 1892, when the property requirement was dropped in favour of occupying rented premises worth £5 a year.

Every workhouse had a complement of full-time staff, often referred to as the indoor staff. At their head was the governor or master, who was appointed by the board of guardians. His duties were laid out in a series of orders issued by the Poor Law Commissioners. As well as the overall administration of the workhouse, masters were required to discipline the paupers as necessary and to visit each ward twice daily, at 11 am and 9 pm. Female inmates and children under seven were the responsibility of the matron, as was the general housekeeping. The master and the matron were usually a married couple, charged with running the workhouse "at the minimum cost and maximum efficiency – for the lowest possible wages".

A large workhouse such as Whitechapel, accommodating several thousand paupers, employed a staff of almost 200; the smallest may only have had a porter and perhaps an assistant nurse in addition to the master and matron. A typical workhouse accommodating 225 inmates had a staff of five, which included a part-time chaplain and a part-time medical officer. The low pay meant that many medical officers were young and inexperienced. To add to their difficulties, in most unions they were obliged to pay out of their own pockets for any drugs, dressings or other medical supplies needed to treat their patients.

== Later developments and abolition ==
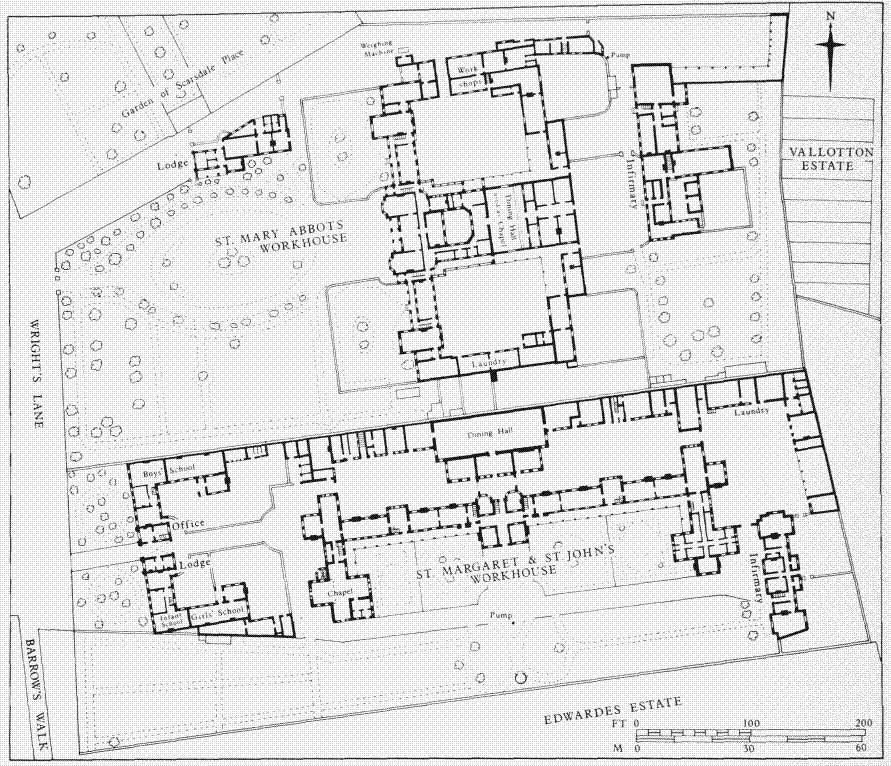
Thomas Allom's design for St Mary Abbots workhouse in Kensington, London, is noticeably different from those produced by Sampson Kempthorne a decade earlier.

A second major wave of workhouse construction began in the mid-1860s, the result of a damning report by the Poor Law inspectors on the conditions found in infirmaries in London and the provinces. Of one workhouse in Southwark, London, an inspector observed bluntly that "The workhouse does not meet the requirements of medical science, nor am I able to suggest any arrangements which would in the least enable it to do so". By the middle of the 19th century, there was a growing realisation that the purpose of the workhouse was no longer solely or even chiefly to act as a deterrent to the able-bodied poor, and the first generation of buildings was widely considered to be inadequate. About 150 new workhouses were built mainly in London, Lancashire and Yorkshire between 1840 and 1875, in architectural styles that began to adopt Italianate or Elizabethan features, to better fit into their surroundings and present a less intimidating face. One surviving example is the gateway at Ripon, designed somewhat in the style of a medieval almshouse. A major feature of this new generation of buildings is the long corridors with separate wards leading off for men, women and children.

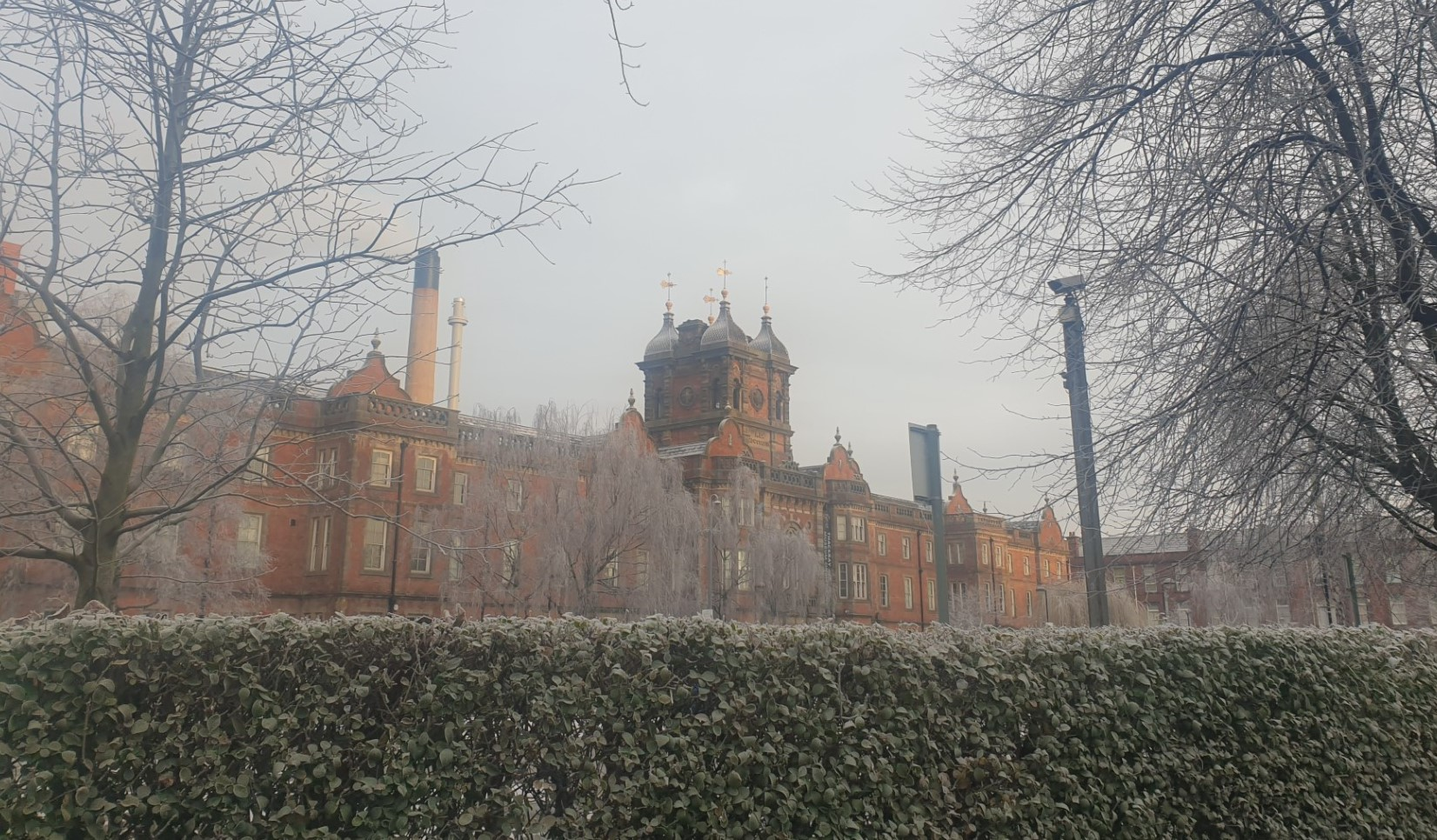
Leeds Union Workhouse, now the Thackray Museum of Medicine, built 1858–1861 in the long corridor design

By 1870 the architectural fashion had moved away from the corridor design in favour of a pavilion style based on the military hospitals built during and after the Crimean War, providing light and well-ventilated accommodation. Opened in 1878, the Manchester Union's infirmary comprised seven parallel three-storey pavilions separated by 80-foot-wide (24 m) "airing yards"; each pavilion had space for 31 beds, a day room, a nurse's kitchen and toilets. By the start of the 20th century new workhouses were often fitted out to an "impressive standard". Opened in 1903, the workhouse at Hunslet in West Riding of Yorkshire had two steam boilers with automatic stokers supplying heating and hot water throughout the building, a generator to provide electricity for the institution's 1,130 electric lamps, and electric lifts in the infirmary pavilion.

As early as 1841 the Poor Law Commissioners were aware of an "insoluble dilemma" posed by the ideology behind the New Poor Law:

If the pauper is always promptly attended by a skilful and well qualified medical practitioner ... if the patient be furnished with all the cordials and stimulants which may promote his recovery: it cannot be denied that his condition in these respects is better than that of the needy and industrious ratepayer who has neither the money nor the influence to secure prompt and careful attendance.

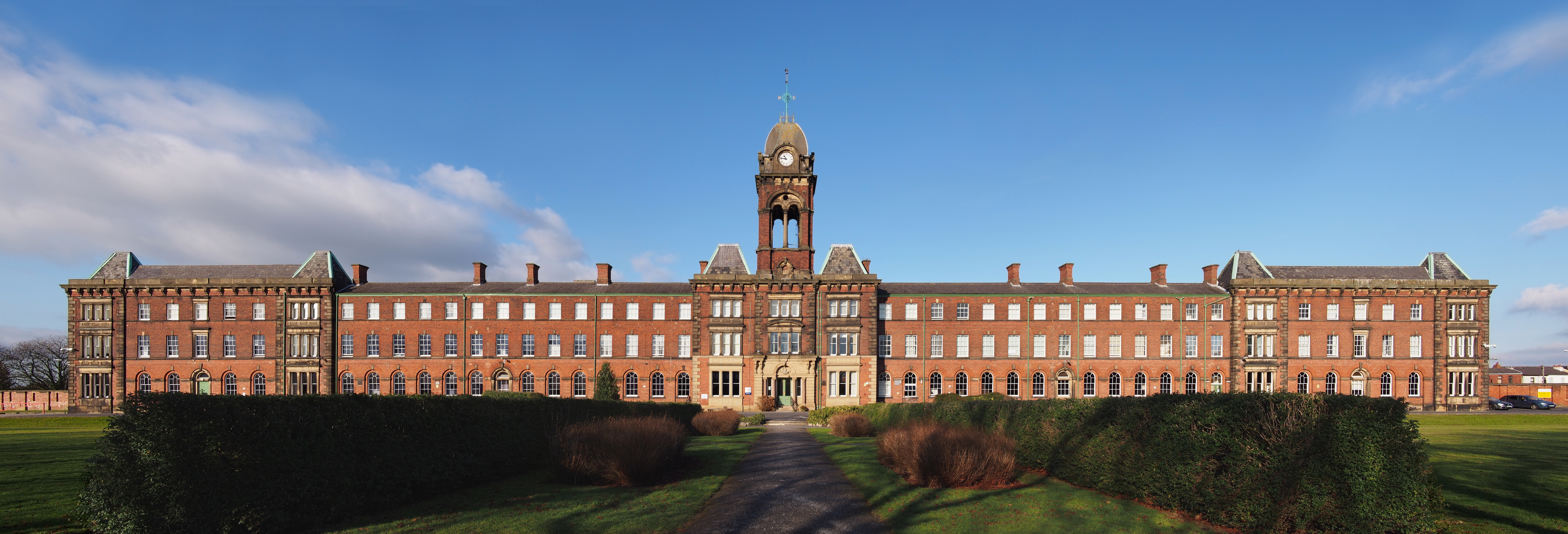
Watling Street Road Workhouse, Preston, built in 1865–1868

The education of children presented a similar dilemma. It was provided free in the workhouse but had to be paid for by the "merely poor"; free primary education for all children was not provided in the UK until 1918. Instead of being "less eligible", conditions for those living in the workhouse were in certain respects "more eligible" than for those living in poverty outside.

Hush-a-bye baby, on the tree top,
When you grow old, your wages will stop,
When you have spent the little you made
First to the Poorhouse and then to the grave

— Anonymous verse from Yorkshire

By the late 1840s most workhouses outside London and the larger provincial towns housed only "the incapable, elderly and sick". By the end of the century only about 20 per cent of those admitted to workhouses were unemployed or destitute, but about 30 per cent of the population over 70 were in workhouses. The introduction of pensions for those aged over 70 in 1908 did not reduce the number of elderly housed in workhouses, but it did reduce the number of those on outdoor relief by 25 per cent.

Responsibility for administration of the Poor Law passed to the Local Government Board in 1871, and the emphasis soon shifted from the workhouse as "a receptacle for the helpless poor" to its role in the care of the sick and helpless. The Diseases Prevention (Metropolis) Act 1883 allowed London workhouse infirmaries to offer treatment to non-paupers as well as inmates, and by the beginning of the 20th century some infirmaries were even able to operate as private hospitals.

The Royal Commission on the Poor Laws and Relief of Distress 1905–1909 reported that workhouses were unsuited to deal with the different categories of resident they had traditionally housed, and recommended that specialised institutions for each class of pauper should be established, in which they could be treated appropriately by properly trained staff. The "deterrent" workhouses were in future to be reserved for "incorrigibles such as drunkards, idlers and tramps". On 24 January 1918 the Daily Telegraph reported that the Local Government Committee on the Poor Law had presented to the Ministry of Reconstruction a report recommending abolition of the workhouses and transferring their duties to other organizations.

The Local Government Act 1929 gave local authorities the power to take over workhouse infirmaries as municipal hospitals, although outside London few did so. The workhouse system was abolished in the UK by the same Act on 1 April 1930, but many workhouses, renamed Public Assistance Institutions, continued under the control of local county councils. At the outbreak of the Second World War in 1939 almost 100,000 people were accommodated in the former workhouses, 5,629 of whom were children.

The National Assistance Act 1948 (11 & 12 Geo. 6. c. 29) abolished the last vestiges of the Poor Law, and with it the workhouses. Many of the workhouse buildings were converted into retirement homes run by the local authorities; slightly more than half of local authority accommodation for the elderly was provided in former workhouses in 1960. Camberwell workhouse (in Peckham, South London) continued until 1985 as a homeless shelter for more than 1,000 men, operated by the Department of Health and Social Security and renamed a resettlement centre. Southwell Workhouse, now a museum, was used to provide temporary accommodation for mothers and children until the early 1990s.

== Views ==
It is beyond the omnipotence of Parliament to meet the conflicting claims of justice to the community; severity to the idle and viscious and mercy to those stricken down into penury by the vicissitudes of God ... There is grinding want among the honest poor; there is starvation, squalor, misery beyond description, children lack food and mothers work their eyes dim and their bodies to emaciation in the vain attempt to find the bare necessities of life, but the Poor Law authorities have no record of these struggles.

— Philanthropist William Rathbone, 1850

The Poor Law was not designed to address the issue of poverty, which was considered to be the inevitable lot for most people; rather it was concerned with pauperism, "the inability of an individual to support himself". Writing in 1806 Patrick Colquhoun commented that:

Poverty ... is a most necessary and indispensable ingredient in society, without which nations and communities could not exist in a state of civilisation. It is the lot of man – it is the source of wealth, since without poverty there would be no labour, and without labour there could be no riches, no refinement, no comfort, and no benefit to those who may be possessed of wealth.

Historian Simon Fowler has argued that workhouses were "largely designed for a pool of able-bodied idlers and shirkers ... However this group hardly existed outside the imagination of a generation of political economists". Workhouse life was intended to be harsh, to deter the able-bodied poor and to ensure that only the truly destitute would apply, a principle known as less eligibility. Contemporary German revolutionary socialist Friedrich Engels described what he imagined the motives of the authors of the 1834 New Poor Law to be, "to force the poor into the Procrustean bed of their preconceived notions. To do this they treated the poor with incredible savagery."

The purpose of workhouse labour was never clear according to historian M. A. Crowther. In the early days of workhouses it was either a punishment or a source of income for the parish, but during the 19th century the idea of work as punishment became increasingly unfashionable. The idea took hold that work should rehabilitate the workhouse inmates for their eventual independence, and that it should therefore be rewarded with no more than the workers' maintenance, otherwise there would be no incentive for them to seek work elsewhere.

== In art and literature ==
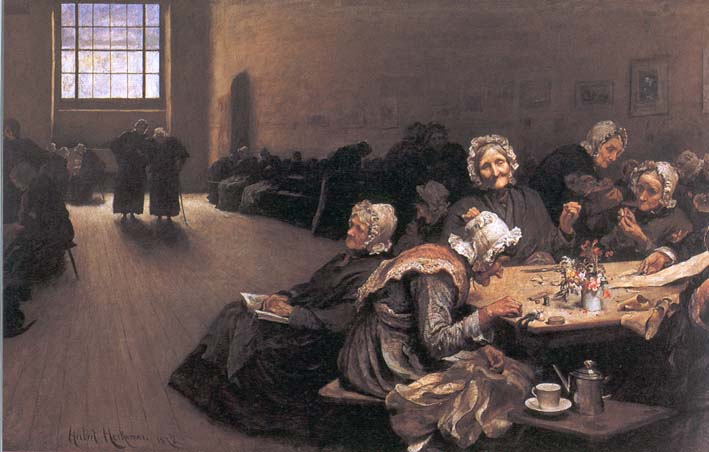
Eventide: A Scene in the Westminster Union (workhouse), 1878, by Sir Hubert von Herkomer

The "dramatic possibilities" of the workhouse provided the inspiration for several artists including Charles West Cope, whose Board Day Application for Bread (1841), depicting a young widow pleading for bread for her four children, was painted following his visit to a meeting of the Staines Board of Guardians. The "quintessential workhouse yarn" is Oliver Twist (1838) by Charles Dickens, which contains the well-known request from Oliver to the master of the workhouse: "Please, sir, I want some more". Another popular piece of workhouse literature was the dramatic monologue In the Workhouse – Christmas Day (1877) by George Robert Sims, with its first line of "It is Christmas Day in the workhouse". In chapter XXVII of his first book, Down and Out in Paris and London (1933), George Orwell gives a brief but vivid account of his stay in a London workhouse when he roamed the streets as a tramp. In 1931 an early version of this account had been published as an essay "The Spike" in an issue of The New Adelphi.

== See also ==
- Almshouse
- Book of Murder
- He who does not work, neither shall he eat
- Poorhouse
- Regency era
- Scottish poorhouse
- Unfree labour
