= Poor Relief Act 1601 =

Act of the Parliament of England

Poor Relief Act 1601 (Note: The citation of this act by this short title was authorised by section 1 of, and the first schedule to, the Short Titles Act 1896. Due to the repeal of those provisions it is now authorised by section 19(2) of the Interpretation Act 1978.)
- Act of Parliament
- Parliament of England
- Long title: An Acte for the Releife of the Poore. (Note: These words are printed against this act in the second column of the first schedule to the Short Titles Act 1896, which is headed "Title".)
- Citation: 43 Eliz. 1. c. 2
- Territorial extent: England and Wales

Dates
- Royal assent: 19 December 1601
- Commencement: 27 October 1601 (Note: Start of session.)
- Repealed: 1 April 1697
Other legislation
Amends	Poor Relief Act 1597
Amended by	Continuance, etc. of Laws Act 1603; Continuance of Laws, etc. Act 1627; Poor Relief Act 1662; Poor Relief Act 1743; Poor Law (Overseers) Act 1849; Statute Law Revision Act 1863; Statute Law Revision Act 1888; Public Authorities Protection Act 1893; Rating and Valuation Act 1925; Poor Law Act 1927; Distress for Rates Act 1960; Local Government Act 1966
Repealed by	General Rate Act 1967
Relates to	Relief of the Poor Act 1696; Poor Act 1697

Status: Repealed

Text of statute as originally enacted

The Poor Relief Act 1601 (43 Eliz. 1. c. 2) was an act of the Parliament of England. The act, popularly known as the Elizabethan Poor Law, the "43rd Elizabeth", (Note: So called because the law was passed in the 43rd year of Elizabeth's reign) or the "Old Poor Law", (Note: as the law which began the era of "Old Poor Law", which ended with the passage of the Poor Law Amendment Act 1834 (4 & 5 Will. 4. c. 76) (the "New Poor Law")) was passed in 1601 and created a poor law system for England and Wales.

It formalised earlier practices of poor relief distribution in England and Wales and is generally considered a refinement of the Poor Relief Act 1597 (39 Eliz. 1. c. 3) that established overseers of the poor. The "Old Poor Law" was not one law but a collection of laws passed between the 16th and 18th centuries. The system's administrative unit was the parish. It was not a centralised government policy but a law which made individual parishes responsible for Poor Law legislation. The 1601 act saw a move away from the more obvious forms of punishing paupers under the Tudor system towards methods of "correction".

Several amending pieces of legislation can be considered part of the Old Poor Law. These include:

- 1662 – Poor Relief Act 1662 (14 Cha. 2. c. 12) (Settlement Acts)
- 1723 – Workhouse Test Act 1723 (9 Geo. 1. c. 7)
- 1782 – Gilbert's Act (22 Geo. 3. c. 83)
- 1795 – Speenhamland

== Origins ==
The origins of the Old Poor Law extend back into the 15th century with the decline of the monasteries and the breakdown of the medieval social structure. Charity was gradually replaced with a compulsory land tax levied at parish level.

== Provisions ==
- The impotent poor (people who can't work) were to be cared for in almshouse or a poorhouse. The law offered relief to people who were unable to work: mainly those who were "lame, impotent, old, blind".
- The able-bodied poor were to be set to work in a house of industry. Materials were to be provided for the poor to be set to work.
- The idle poor (those considered lazy and not making an effort to find work) and vagrants were to be sent to a house of correction or even prison.
- Pauper children would become apprentices.

Text of the act Reginae Elizabethae Anno 43 Chapter 2

== Description ==
Relief under the Old Poor Law could take on one of two forms – indoor relief, relief inside a workhouse, or outdoor relief, relief in a form outside a workhouse. This could come in the form of money, food or even clothing. As the cost of building the different workhouses was great, outdoor relief continued to be the main form of relief in this period.

Relief for those too ill or old to work, the so-called "impotent poor", was in the form of a payment or items of food ("the parish loaf") or clothing also known as outdoor relief. Some aged people might be accommodated in parish alms houses, though these were usually private charitable institutions. Meanwhile, able-bodied beggars who had refused work were often placed in houses of correction (indoor relief). However, provision for the many able-bodied poor in the workhouse, which provided accommodation at the same time as work, was relatively unusual, and most workhouses developed later. The 1601 Law said that poor parents and children were responsible for each other – elderly parents would live with their children.

The 1601 Poor Law could be described as "parochial" as the administrative unit of the system was the parish. There were around 1,500 such parishes based upon the area around a parish church. This system allowed greater sensitivity towards paupers, but also made tyrannical behaviour from overseers possible. Overseers of the poor would know their paupers and so be able to differentiate between the "deserving" and "undeserving" poor. The Elizabethan Poor Law operated at a time when the population was small enough for everyone to know everyone else, so people's circumstances would be known and the idle poor would be unable to claim on the parishes' poor rate.

The act levied a poor rate on each parish which overseers of the poor were able to collect. Those who had to pay this rate were property owners, or rather, in most cases, occupiers including tenants.

The act sought to deal with "settled" poor who had found themselves temporarily out of work – it was assumed they would accept indoor relief or outdoor relief. Neither method of relief was at this time in history seen as harsh. The act was supposed to deal with beggars who were considered a threat to civil order. The act was passed at a time when poverty was considered necessary as it was thought that only fear of poverty made people work.

In 1607 a house of correction was set up in each county. However, this system was separate from the 1601 system which distinguished between the settled poor and "vagrants".

== Criticisms ==
=== Implementation and variation ===
There was much variation in the application of the law and there was a tendency for the destitute to migrate towards the more generous parishes, usually situated in the towns. There was wide variation in the amount of poor relief given out. As the parish was the administrative unit of the system there was great diversity in the system. Since there were no administrative standards, parishes were able to interpret the law as they wished.

Some cities, such as Bristol, Exeter and Liverpool were able to obtain by-laws which established their control onto several of the urban parishes within their jurisdiction. Bristol gained a private act of Parliament in 1696, the Bristol Workhouse Act 1695 (7 & 8 Will. 3. c. 32 Pr.), which allowed the city to create a 'manufactory' so that the profits from the paupers' work could be used for maintenance of the poor relief system.

=== Outdoor relief ===
Outdoor relief continued to be the most popular form of relief for the able-bodied poor even though the law described that "the poor should be set to work". In 1795 the Speenhamland system was introduced as a system of outdoor relief. Again, there was variation within the system with some parishes subsidising with food and others with money. Some parishes were more generous than others so there was no uniformity to the system. The Speenhamland system was popular in the south of England. Elsewhere the Roundsman and Labour rate were used. The system was designed for a pre-industrial society, industrialisation, a mobile population, a series of bad harvests during the 1790s and the Napoleonic Wars tested the old poor law to the breaking point.

=== Settlement ===
The Poor Relief Act 1601 states that each individual parish was responsible for its 'own' poor. Arguments over which parish was responsible for a pauper's poor relief and concerns over migration to more generous parishes led to the passing of the Settlement Act 1662 (14 Cha. 2. c. 12) which allowed relief only to established residents of a parish – mainly through birth, marriage and apprenticeship. A pauper applicant had to prove a 'settlement’. If unable to, they were removed to the next parish that was nearest to the place of their birth, or where they might prove some connection. Some paupers were moved hundreds of miles. Although each parish that they passed through was not responsible for them, they were supposed to supply food and drink and shelter for at least one night.

Individual parishes were keen to keep costs of poor relief as low as possible and there are examples of paupers in some cases being shunted back and forth between parishes. The Settlement Laws allowed strangers to a parish to be removed after 40 days if they were not working, but the cost of removing such people meant that they were often left until they tried to claim poor relief. In 1697 Settlement Laws were tightened when people could be barred from entering a parish unless they produced a Settlement certificate.

=== Effect on the labour market ===
The act was criticised in later years for its distortion of the labour market, through the power given to parishes to let them remove 'undeserving' poor. Another criticism of the Act was that it applied to rated land not personal or movable wealth, therefore benefiting commercial and business interests.

=== Cost ===
The building of different types of workhouses was expensive. The Workhouse Test Act 1723 (9 Geo. 1. c. 7) allowed parishes to combine and apply for a workhouse test, where conditions were made worse than those outside.

The Workhouse Test Act 1723 stated that workhouses, poorhouses and houses of correction should be built for the different types of pauper. However, it was not cost-effective to build these different types of buildings. For this reason parishes such as Bristol combined these institutions so that the profits paupers made were plunged back into the maintenance of the system.

=== Reliance on the parish ===
The system's reliance on the parish can be seen as both a strength and a weakness. It could be argued it made the system more humane and sensitive, but a local crisis such as a poor harvest could be a great burden on the local poor rate.

== Variation from the system ==
The 18th-century workhouse movement began at the end of the 17th century with the establishment of the Bristol Corporation of the Poor, founded by the Bristol Workhouse Act 1695 (7 & 8 Will. 3. c. 32 Pr.) in 1696. The corporation established a workhouse which combined housing and care of the poor with a house of correction for petty offenders. Following the example of Bristol, twelve more towns and cities established similar corporations in the next two decades. Because these corporations required a private act, they were not suitable for smaller towns and individual parishes.

Starting with the parish of Olney, Buckinghamshire in 1714, several dozen small towns and individual parishes established their own institutions without any specific legal authorisation. These were concentrated in the South Midlands and in the county of Essex. From the late 1710s the Society for the Promotion of Christian Knowledge began to promote the idea of parochial workhouses.

== Knatchbull's Act ==
The Society published several pamphlets on the subject, and supported Sir Edward Knatchbull in his successful efforts to steer the Poor Relief Act 1722 (9 Geo. 1. c. 7), also known as the Workhouse Test Act, through Parliament in 1723. The act gave legislative authority for the establishment of parochial workhouses, by both single parishes and as joint ventures between two or more parishes. More importantly, the act helped to publicise the idea of establishing workhouses to a national audience. The Workhouse Test Act made workhouses a deterrent as conditions were to be regulated to make them worse than outside of the workhouse. However, during this period outdoor relief was still the most popular method of poor relief as it was easier to administer.

By 1776 some 1,912 parish and corporation workhouses had been established in England and Wales, housing almost 100,000 paupers. Although many parishes and pamphlet writers expected to earn money from the labour of the poor in workhouses, the vast majority of people obliged to take up residence in workhouses were ill, elderly, or children whose labour proved largely unprofitable. The demands, needs and expectations of the poor also ensured that workhouses came to take on the character of general social policy institutions, combining the functions of crèche, night shelter, geriatric ward and orphanage.

== Gilbert's Act ==
The Relief of the Poor Act 1782 (22 Geo. 3. c. 83), also known as Gilbert's Act, was passed to combat the excessive costs of outdoor relief. It promoted indoor alternatives and allowed parishes to combine to support the impotent poor. However, outdoor relief was still used to help the able-bodied poor.

== Overhaul ==
=== Industrialisation ===
The 1601 system was for a pre-industrial society and the massive population increases after the Industrial Revolution strained the existing system. Mechanisation meant that unemployment was increasing, therefore poor relief costs could not be met.

=== French Wars ===
The French Revolutionary Wars and Napoleonic Wars occurred in 1792–1797, 1798–1801, 1805–1807, and 1813–1814, and ended after the Battle of Waterloo in 1815. The wars meant that there were periods of trade blockades on Britain which prevented Britain from importing large amounts of grain, thus raising the price of bread. The blockades coupled with poor harvests in 1813 and 1814 kept the price of bread high.

After the war cheap imports returned. Many farmers went bankrupt because poor rate remained high. Farmers also had to pay war-time taxes. Resulting bankruptcies caused rural workers to become unemployed, and many farmers that survived lowered their workers' wages.

The Corn Laws were passed by the Tory government of Lord Liverpool to protect British farmers. Imports could not occur until prices had reached 80 shillings a quarter. This aimed to prevent both grain prices and wages from fluctuating. However, this kept prices artificially high and made more people claim poor relief. Returning soldiers further added to pressures on the Poor Law system. Further poor harvests in 1818 and 1819 meant that the costs of poor relief hit £8m during this period.

=== Corruption ===
In 1819 select vestries were established. These were committees set up in each parish which were responsible for Poor Law administration. There were concerns over corruption within the system as contracts for supplying food and beer often went to local traders or these vestries.

=== Cost ===
The cost of the current system was increasing from the late 18th century into the 19th century. Although outdoor relief was cheaper than building workhouses, the numbers claiming outdoor relief increased. The increasing numbers of people claiming relief peaked after the economic dislocation caused by the French Wars when it was 12 shillings per head of population. During this period strain was also put on the system by a population increase from 9 million to 14 million in the time period indicated by the graph.

=== Unrest ===
One reason for changing the system was to prevent unrest or even revolution. Habeas Corpus was suspended and the Six Acts passed to prevent possible riots. The Swing Riots highlighted the possibility of agricultural unrest.

=== Criticism from leading intellectuals ===
Jeremy Bentham argued for a disciplinary, punitive approach to social problems, whilst the writings of Thomas Malthus focused attention on the problem of overpopulation, and the growth of illegitimacy. David Ricardo argued that there was an "iron law of wages". The effect of poor relief, in the view of the reformers, was to undermine the position of the "independent labourer".

== Reform ==
The 1832 Royal Commission into the Operation of the Poor Laws wrote a report stating the changes which needed to be made to the poor. These changes were implemented in the Poor Law Amendment Act 1834, popularly known as the New Poor Law and aimed at restricting intervention to indoor relief.

== Subsequent developments ==
The whole act was continued until the end of first session of the next parliament by section 23 of the Continuance, etc. of Laws Act 1603 (1 Jas. 1. c. 25), with the addition that "all persons, to whom the overseers of the poor shall, according to this act, bind any children apprentices, may take and receive, and keep them as apprentices; any former statute to the contrary notwithstanding."

The whole act, as amended, was continued until the end of the first session of the next session by section 3 of the Continuance of Laws, etc. Act 1627 (3 Cha. 1 . c. 5).

Sections 11–16 and 19 of the act were by section 1 of, and the schedule to, the Statute Law Revision Act 1863 (26 & 27 Vict. c. 125), which came into force on 28 July 1863.

Section 18 of the act was repealed by section 2 of, and the schedule to, the Public Authorities Protection Act 1893 (56 & 57 Vict. c. 61), which came into force on 1 January 1894.

Sections 2 and 7 of the act were repealed by section 15(1) of, and the second schedule to, the Distress for Rates Act 1960 (8 & 9 Eliz. 2. c. 12), which came into force on 1 April 1960.

The whole act was repealed by section 117(1) of, and part I of the schedule 14 to, the General Rate Act 1967, which came into force on 1 April 1968.

== Historiography ==
The Historian Mark Blaug has defended the Old Poor Law system and criticised the Poor Law Amendment Act. Evidence to the 1837 Committee on the Poor Law Amendment Act also found some support for the existing system.

== Ongoing Impact ==
The act is considered to be the origin of local rating for the purpose of business rates, in that it established the occupier-based concept which is still recognisable in modern non-domestic rating, where business rates are normally payable by occupiers of non-domestic property. This was cited in Cinderella Rockerfellas Ltd v Valuation Officer ([2003] EWCA Civ 529 11 April 2003), Text. Sir Anthony Earby’s case (1633) 2 Bulst 354 which focused on the impact of the Poor Relief Act 1601 was cited in Cinderella Rockerfellas Ltd v Valuation Officer for the proposition that assessments under the act were to be made according to the “visible estate” of inhabitants, both real and personal.

That personal-property element did not survive indefinitely; the Court of Appeal noted that the rateability of inhabitants for personal property, i.e. chattels, was abolished by the Poor Rate Exemption Act 1840.

A ratepayer’s liability in respect of occupied hereditaments now arises from the express provision contained in Local Government Finance Act 1988.

== See also ==
- English poor laws
- Tudor poor laws
- UK labour law
- Poor relief, worldwide
- History of the welfare state in the United Kingdom
- History of poverty in the United Kingdom
