= Speenhamland system =

Form of outdoor relief

The Speenhamland system was a form of outdoor relief intended to mitigate rural poverty in England and Wales at the end of the 18th century and during the early 19th century. The law was an amendment to the Elizabethan Poor Law (the Poor Relief Act 1601). It was created as an indirect result of Britain's involvements in the French Revolutionary and Napoleonic Wars (1793–1815).

== Operation ==
The system was named after a meeting held on 6 May, 1795 in the Pelikan Inn, Speenhamland, Berkshire, where local magistrates devised the system as a means to alleviate the distress caused by high grain prices. The increase in the price of grain may have occurred as a result of a poor harvest in the years 1795–96, though at the time this was subject to great debate. Many blamed middlemen and hoarders as the ultimate architects of the shortage.

The Speenhamland scale read, "When a gallon loaf of bread cost one shilling:... every Poor and Industrious Man should have for his own Support 3s weekly, either produced by his Family's Labour, or an Allowance from the Poor rates, and for the support of wife and every other of his Family 1s 6d.... When the Gallon loaf shall cost 1s 4d then every Poor and Industrious Man shall have 4s Weekly for his own, and 1s and 10d for the Support of every other of his Family. And so on in proportion as the price of bread rises and falls."

The authorities at Speenhamland approved a means-tested sliding-scale of wage supplements in order to mitigate the worst effects of rural poverty. Families were paid extra to top up wages to a set level according to a table. This level varied according to the number of children and the price of bread. For example, if bread was 1s 2d (14 pence) a loaf, the wages of a family with two children were topped up to 8s 6d (102 pence).

The first formula was set at a time of high prices and possible over-charging, minimum wage inflation was deliberately muted compared to price rises. If bread rose to 1s 8d (20 pence) the wages were topped up to 11s 0d (132 pence). In this quoted example in percentage terms, a 43% price rise led to a 30% wage rise (wages fell from 7.3 to 6.6 loaves).

The immediate impact of paying the poor rate fell on the landowners of the parish concerned. They then sought other means of dealing with the poor, such as the workhouse funded through parish unions. Eventually pressure due to structural poverty caused the introduction of the new Poor Law (1834).

The Speenhamland system appears to have reached its height during the Napoleonic Wars, when it was a means of allaying dangerous discontent among growing numbers of rural poor faced by soaring food prices, and to have died out in the post-war period, except in a few parishes. The system was popular in the south of England. William Pitt the Younger attempted to get the idea passed into legislation but failed. The system was not adopted nationally but was popular in the counties which experienced the Swing Riots during the 1830s.

== Criticisms ==
In 1834, the Report of the Royal Commission into the Operation of the Poor Laws 1832 called the Speenhamland System a "universal system of pauperism". The system allowed employers, including farmers and the nascent industrialists of the town, to pay below subsistence wages, because the parish would make up the difference and keep their workers alive. So the workers' low income was unchanged and the poor rate contributors subsidised the farmers.

Thomas Malthus believed a system of supporting the poor would lead to increased population growth rates because the Poor Laws encouraged early marriage and prolific procreation, which would be a problem due to the Malthusian catastrophe (where population growth would exceed food production). More recent scholarly analysis of census data by E. A. Wrigley, and Richard Smith shows that Malthus was mistaken.

Historian Rutger Bregman argues that food production actually grew steadily by a third between 1790 and 1830, though with a smaller section of the populace able to access it due to mechanization, and the population growth that actually happened was due to growing demand for child labour and not Speenhamland.

David Ricardo believed that Speenhamland would create a poverty trap, where the poor would work less, which would make food production fall, in its turn creating the space for a revolution;. However, Bregman argues the poverty that existed back then was not caused by a supposed Speenhamland "poverty trap", as "wage earners were permitted to keep at least part of their allowances when their earnings increased", but instead was the result of price hikes resulting from England returning to the gold standard, a policy Ricardo himself had recommended.

While some scholars believe that social unrest resulted from the system, others believe it was due to the adoption of the gold standard and industrialization, which equally affected all the populace in areas with or without Speenhamland.

This system of poor relief, and others like it, lasted until the passing of the Poor Law Amendment Act 1834, which prohibited boards of guardians supplementing the wages of full-time workers. This was not always implemented locally as guardians did not want to separate families in workhouses, and it was often cheaper to supplement wages than operate larger workhouses.

Evidence in the last 30 years shows that the bread scale devised during the Speenhamland meeting in 1795 was by no means universal, and that even the system of outdoor relief which found one of its earliest, though not its first, expressions in Speenhamland was not completely widespread. Allowances or supplements to wages were used generally as a temporary measure and the way they operated differed between regions. Mark Blaug's 1960 essay The Myth of the Old Poor Law charged the commissioners of 1834 with largely using the Speenhamland system to vilify the old poor law and create a will for the passage of a new one. However, historians such as Eric Hobsbawm have argued that the old poor law was still damaging by subsidising employers, and heightening dependency of workers' incomes on local aristocrats.

Daniel A. Baugh argues that relief costs did not greatly increase. After the Napoleonic Wars the conditions of employment and subsistence in south-east England underwent a fundamental change. The Speenhamland System did not differ much in consequences from the older system; what mattered was the shape of the poverty problem.

== See also ==
- Roundsman
- Labour Rate
- Poor Law
