= George and Pelican Inn =

English coaching inn

Coordinates: 51°24′21″N 1°19′29″W

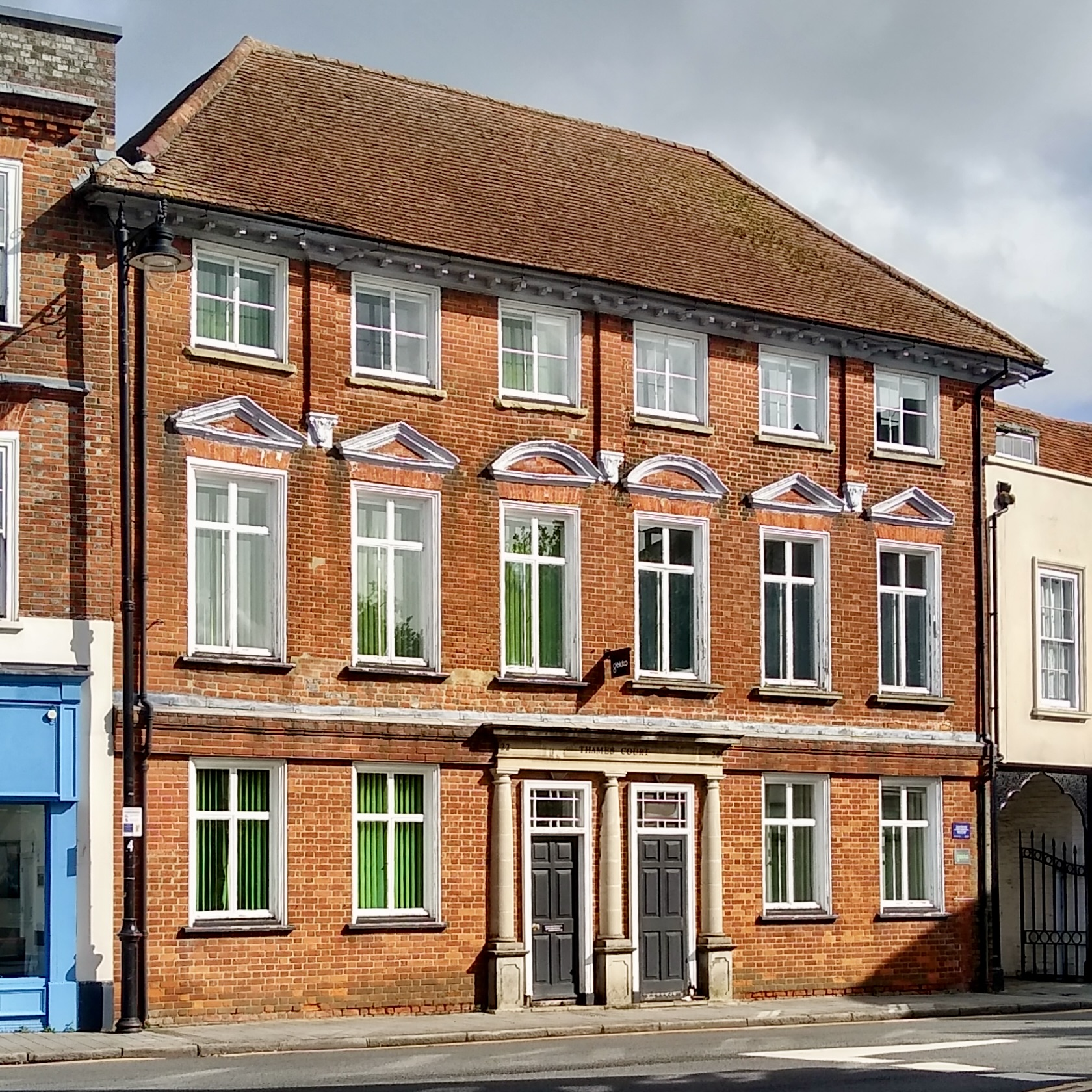
Originally the George Inn Speenhamland, then amalgamated as the George and Pelican

The George and Pelican Inn was an English coaching inn that provided food, entertainment and overnight accommodation for travellers between London and Bath for over 200 years, from the middle of the seventeenth century until the opening of Newbury station in 1847. Originally two separate inns, they later combined, although each retained a separate identity by providing different services.

Located in Speenhamland, Newbury, Berkshire, it was the most famous of a series of pubs located on the London to Bath Road, now the A4 as it runs through Newbury. The building occupied by the George and Pelican was Grade II listed in 1950.

== Famous visitors ==
- 1784: George III and an entourage including his queen and two of their daughters stopped briefly at the inn to change horses whilst on their way to visit Tottenham Park in Marlborough.
- 1822: William Cobbett held a meeting at the inn in October 1822. This was attended by over 200 people, and the crowd overflowed into the street.
