= Labour Rate =

System of poor relief in England (1832–1834)

The Labour Rate was a system of poor relief (outdoor relief), used in England from 1832 to 1834, where workers were paid at a given rate. If this was not met then the rest had to be made up by the parish's poor relief. It was authorised by the Agricultural Labourers Act 1832, and adopted in about 1 in 5 parishes until it was replaced by the Poor Law Amendment Act 1834.

== See also ==
- Speenhamland system
- Roundsman
- Poor Law
