= Relief of the Poor Act 1782 =

Act of the Parliament of Great Britain

- Act of Parliament
- Parliament of Great Britain
- Long title: An Act for the better Relief and Employment of the Poor.
- Citation: 22 Geo. 3. c. 83
- Territorial extent: Great Britain

Dates
- Royal assent: 11 July 1782
- Commencement: 25 March 1783 (Note: Section 1.)
- Repealed: 21 August 1871
Other legislation
Amended by	Poor (No. 2) Act 1800
Repealed by	Statute Law Revision Act 1871
Relates to	Poor (Settlement and Removal) Act 1809

Status: Repealed

Text of statute as originally enacted

The Relief of the Poor Act 1782 (22 Geo. 3. c. 83), also known as Gilbert's Act, was an act of the Parliament of Great Britain, which was a poor relief law proposed by Thomas Gilbert which aimed to organise poor relief on a county basis, counties being organised into parishes which could set up poorhouses or workhouses between them. However, these workhouses were intended to help only the elderly, sick and orphaned, not the able-bodied poor. The sick, elderly and infirm were cared for in poorhouses whereas the able-bodied poor were provided with poor relief in their own homes. Gilbert's Act aimed to be more humane than the previous modification to the Poor Law, the Workhouse Test Act (9 Geo. 1. c. 7). During the 1780s, there was an increase in unemployment and underemployment due to high food prices, low wages and the effects of enclosing land. This caused poor rates to increase rapidly, which wealthy landowners found unacceptable.

== Passage ==
Thomas Gilbert attempted to pass an act "for the better relief and employment of the poor" in 1765. Gilbert was a supporter of the 5th Duke of Bedford, which led to his act being blocked by Charles Wentworth, 2nd Marquess of Rockingham. Gilbert tried for 17 years to get his bill passed by parliament, eventually succeeding during Rockingham's second term as prime minister.

== Subsequent developments ==
The whole act was repealed by section 1 of, and the schedule to, the Statute Law Revision Act 1871 (34 & 35 Vict. c. 116), which came into force on 21 August 1871.
