= Speenhamland, Berkshire =

Suburb of Newbury in Berkshire, England

Coordinates: 51.407°N 1.325°W

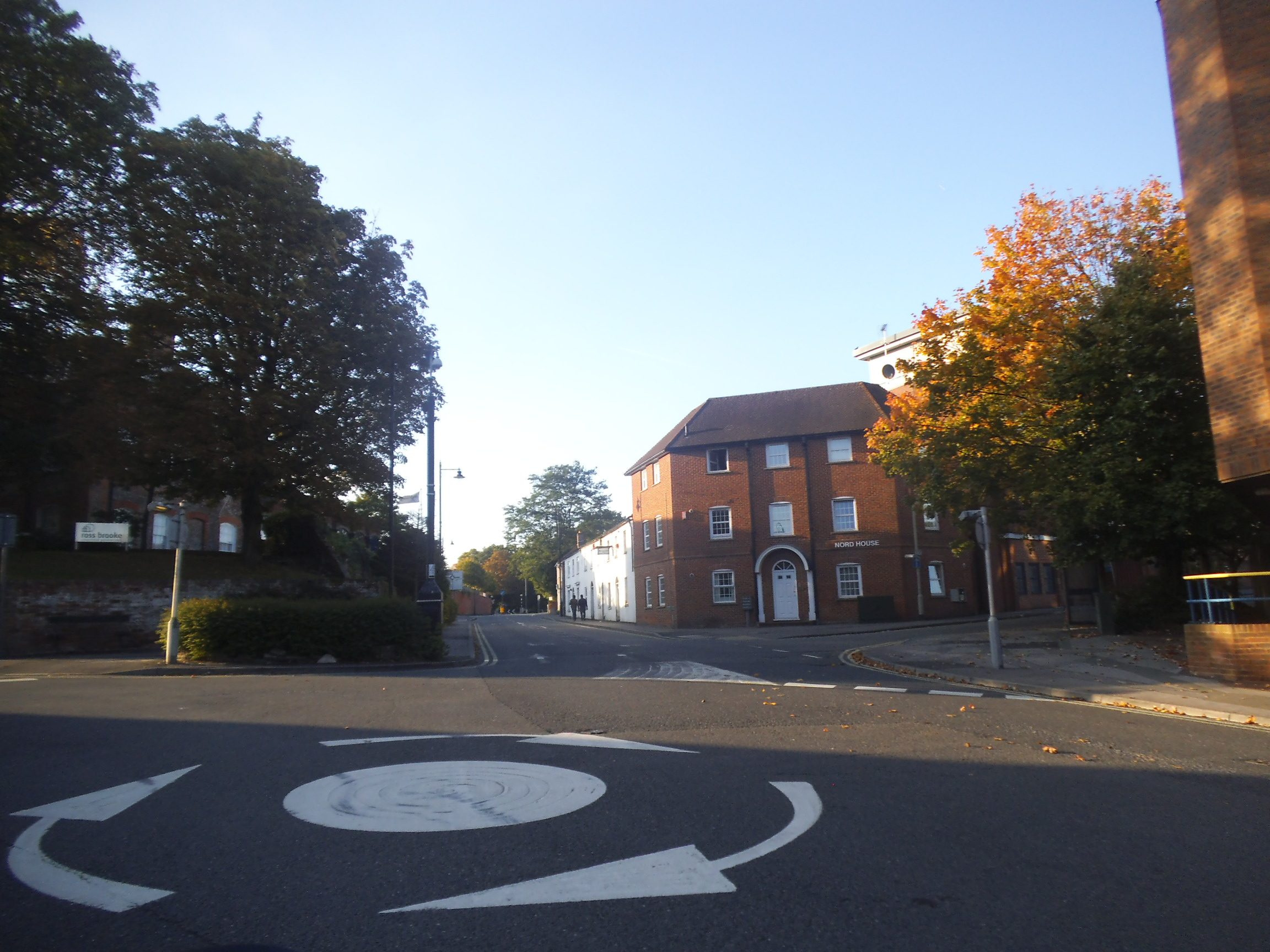
Oxford Street roundabout

Speenhamland is a suburb of Newbury, Berkshire.

== Name and location ==
Its name is probably derived from Old English Spen-haema-land, "land of the inhabitants of Speen", with "Speen" perhaps being formed on a Brittonic root deriving from Latin spinis, "thorns".

Speenhamland was a tithing, or administrative subdivision, of the parish of Speen, though even in the early 19th century it was contiguous with the suburbs of Newbury. It lies to the north of the River Kennet, between the centre of Newbury and Speen village to the north-west.

== Poor relief ==
The Speenhamland system of poor relief was devised at a meeting in the area in 1795. It set poor-relief rates by the bread price and the number of household members, in or out of work.
