= Roundsman System =

Form of outdoor relief in England

The Roundsman System (sometimes termed the billet, or ticket, or item system), in the Poor Relief Act 1601, was a form of organised labour exchange for the poorest labourers by which a parish vestry helped to pay local farmers, households and others to employ such applicants for relief at a rate of headline wages negotiated and set by the parish. It depended not on the services, but on the wants of the applicants: the employers being repaid out of the poor rate (local taxation) all they advanced in wages beyond a very low-wage amount. Variants of the Roundsman system operated and co-existed from parish-to-parish and sometimes depending on type of labour.

== Details ==
According to this plan the parish in general agreed with a farmer to sell to him the labour of one or more paupers at a certain price, paying to the pauper out of the parish funds the difference between that price and the subsistence rate (the difference being an allowance which the scale, according to the price of bread and the number of his family, awarded him). It received the local name of "billet" or "ticket system" from the ticket signed by the overseer which the pauper in general carried to the farmer as a warrant for his being employed, and afterwards took back to the overseer, signed by the farmer, as a proof that he had fulfilled the conditions of relief.

In other cases and parishes the parish contracted with a person to have some work performed for him by the paupers at a given price, the parish paying the paupers from that person and general funds.

== Labour auctions ==
In many parishes the roundsman system was conducted by means of an auction, all the unemployed men being put up to sale periodically, sometimes monthly or weekly, at prices varying according to the time of year, the old and infirm selling for less than the able-bodied. The roundsman system was discontinued by the Poor Law Amendment Act 1834.

== See also ==
- Poor relief in England
- Speenhamland system
