= House of correction =

Penal facility

The house of correction was a type of establishment built after the passing of the Poor Relief Act 1601, places where those who were "unwilling to work", including vagrants and beggars, were set to work. The building of houses of correction came after the passing of an amendment to the Elizabethan Poor Law. However the houses of correction were not considered a part of the Elizabethan Poor Law system because the Act distinguished between settled poor and wandering poor.

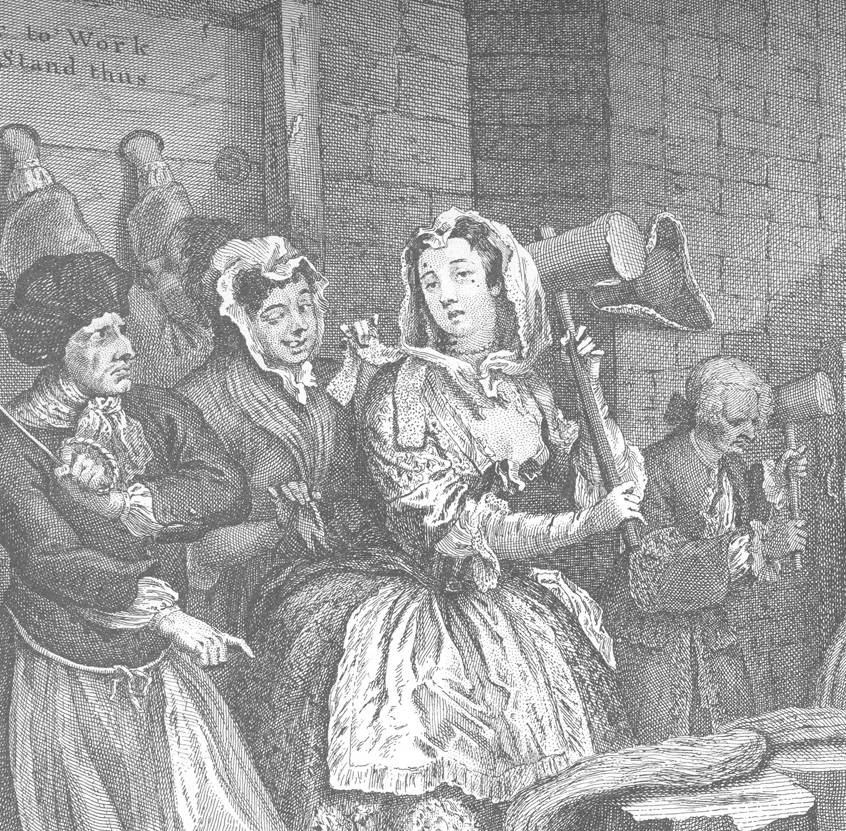
A Harlot's Progress by William Hogarth. Moll Hackabout beats hemp in Bridewell Prison.

== History ==
The first London house of correction was Bridewell Prison, and the Middlesex and Westminster houses also opened in the early seventeenth century.

Due to the first reformation of manners campaign, the late seventeenth century was marked by the growth in the number of houses of correction, often generically termed bridewells, established and by the passage of numerous statutes prescribing houses of correction as the punishment for specific minor offences.

Offenders were typically committed to houses of correction by justices of the peace, who used their powers of summary jurisdiction with respect to minor offences. In the Middlesex and Westminster houses of correction in the late seventeenth and early eighteenth centuries the most common charges against prisoners were prostitution, petty theft, and "loose, idle and disorderly conduct" (a loosely defined offence which could involve a wide range of misbehaviour). Over two-thirds of the prisoners were female.

More than half of offenders were released within a week, and two-thirds within two weeks. In addition to imprisonment in a house of correction, over half of the convicted were whipped, particularly those found guilty of theft, vagrancy, and lewd conduct and nightwalking (prostitution).

Virtually all the prisoners were required to do hard labour, typically beating hemp.

In 1720 an act allowed the use of houses of corrections for pretrial detention of "vagrants, and other criminals, offenders, and persons charged with small offences". By the 1760s and 1770s, prisoners awaiting trial accounted for more than three-quarters of those committed to the Middlesex and Westminster houses.

== Current facilities called house of correction ==
In the Commonwealth of Massachusetts, the term house of correction remains synonymous with state jails. The same is true for the State of Maryland. Milwaukee County, Wisconsin maintains a separate house of correction from its downtown jail facility.
