= Poor rate =

Former type of property tax

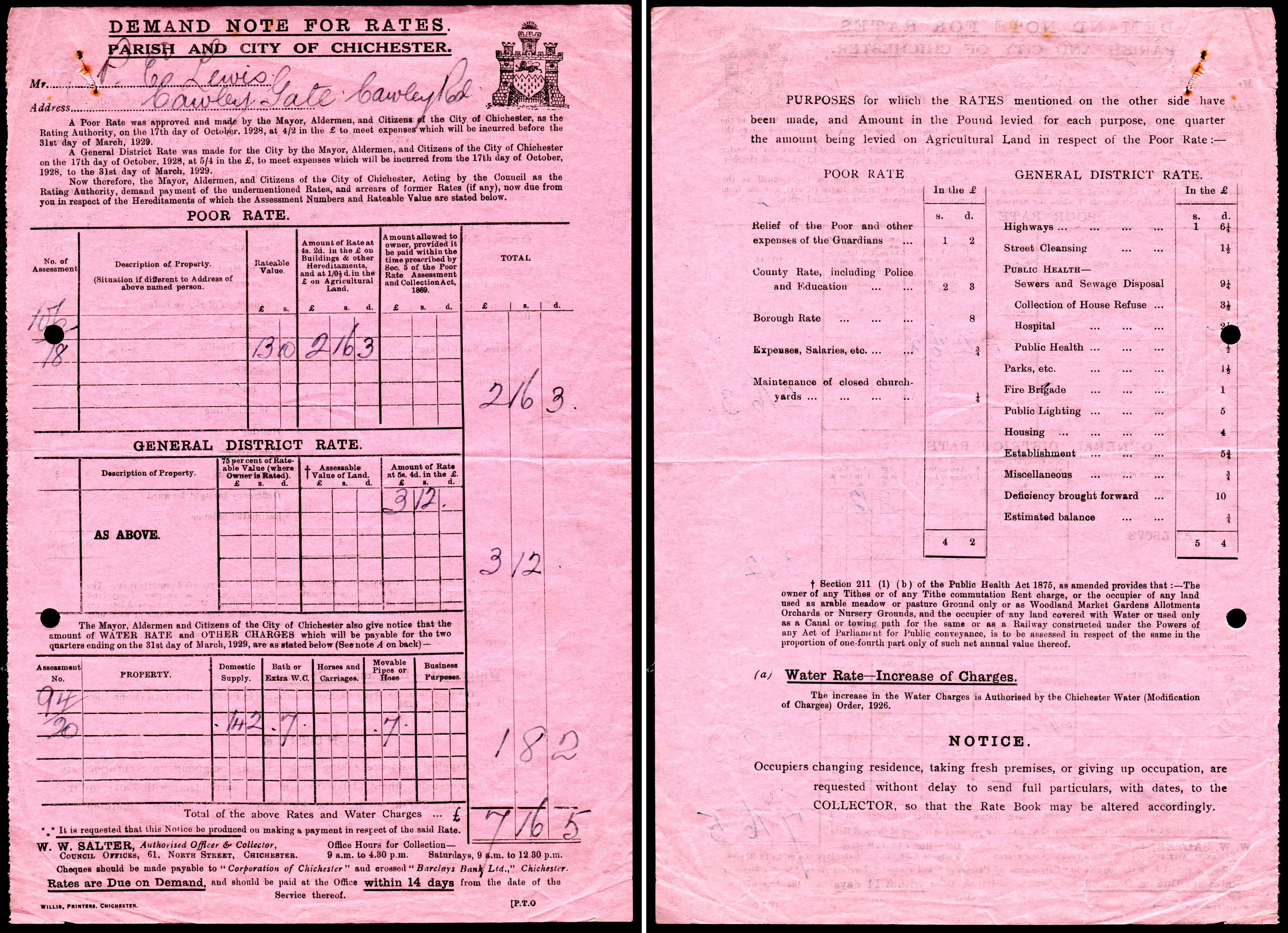
A 1928/29 local taxes bill from the City of Chichester showing a levy for the Poor Rate.

In England and Wales the poor rate was a tax on property levied in each parish, which was used to provide poor relief. It was collected under both the Old Poor Law and the New Poor Law. It was absorbed into "general rate" local taxation in the 1920s, and has continuity with the currently existing Council Tax.

== Introduction ==
The Poor Relief Act 1601 consolidated earlier poor relief legislation and introduced a system of rating property. The introduction of the poor rate required the authorities, known as a vestry, in each parish to meet once a year to set the poor rate and to appoint an overseer of the poor to collect the rate. The justices of the peace at the quarter sessions had a role in checking the accounts of the poor rate.

== Reform ==
The system of rating was subject to reform, such as excluding property outside of the parish in which a rate was paid. Because the poor rate was collected and spent locally within a single parish the notion of settlement was confirmed by the Poor Relief Act 1662 to exclude the poor from other parishes.

The Poor Law Amendment Act 1834 removed responsibility for collection of the poor rate from the parish vestries. The collection of poor rate continued to be organised by parish, now collected by the poor law guardians for the parish. Although parishes were often grouped into unions, each parish could be set a different rate depending on the expenditure.

During the 19th century a number of anomalies in the parish system were corrected, for example where parishes were divided into chapelries each acting much like a distinct parish. The criteria used by the Poor Law Amendment Act 1866 for areas that should form civil parishes was that they set their own poor rate.

=== London ===
The Metropolitan Poor Act 1867 (30 & 31 Vict. c. 6) established a metropolitan poor rate to be collected across the area of the Metropolitan Board of Works. The London (Equalisation of Rates) Act 1894 provided that richer parishes in what was now the County of London would subsidise the poor rate of the less wealthy that had higher expenditure.

== Abolition ==
The system of rating for the poor rate was used as the basis of other rates, such as the general county rate from 1738.

The separate poor rate was amalgamated with the local district or borough general rate by the Rating and Valuation Act 1925 (15 & 16 Geo. 5. c. 90). The role of parishes and guardians in the setting and collection of rates was abolished by 1930. The districts and boroughs became the rating authorities for setting and collecting rates and this has continuity with the current billing authorities that set and collect Council Tax.
