= List of acts of the Parliament of the United Kingdom from 1866 =

This is a complete list of acts of the Parliament of the United Kingdom for the year 1866.

Note that the first parliament of the United Kingdom was held in 1801; parliaments between 1707 and 1800 were either parliaments of Great Britain or of Ireland. For acts passed up until 1707, see the list of acts of the Parliament of England and the list of acts of the Parliament of Scotland. For acts passed from 1707 to 1800, see the list of acts of the Parliament of Great Britain. See also the list of acts of the Parliament of Ireland.

For acts of the devolved parliaments and assemblies in the United Kingdom, see the list of acts of the Scottish Parliament, the list of acts of the Northern Ireland Assembly, and the list of acts and measures of Senedd Cymru; see also the list of acts of the Parliament of Northern Ireland.

The number shown after each act's title is its chapter number. Acts passed before 1963 are cited using this number, preceded by the year(s) of the reign during which the relevant parliamentary session was held; thus the Union with Ireland Act 1800 is cited as "39 & 40 Geo. 3 c. 67", meaning the 67th act passed during the session that started in the 39th year of the reign of George III and which finished in the 40th year of that reign. Note that the modern convention is to use Arabic numerals in citations (thus "41 Geo. 3" rather than "41 Geo. III"). Acts of the last session of the Parliament of Great Britain and the first session of the Parliament of the United Kingdom are both cited as "41 Geo. 3".

Some of these acts have a short title. Some of these acts have never had a short title. Some of these acts have a short title given to them by later acts, such as by the Short Titles Act 1896.

== 29 & 30 Vict. ==
The first session of the 19th Parliament of the United Kingdom, which met from 1 February 1866 until 10 August 1866.

=== Public general acts ===
Short title	Citation	Royal assent
Long title
Habeas Corpus Suspension (Ireland) Act 1866 (repealed)	29 & 30 Vict. c. 1	17 February 1866
An Act to empower the Lord Lieutenant or other Chief Governor or Governors of Ireland to apprehend, and detain for a limited Time, such Persons as he or they shall suspect of conspiring against Her Majesty's Person and Government. (Repealed by Statute Law Revision Act 1875 (38 & 39 Vict. c. 66))
Cattle Diseases Prevention Act 1866 (repealed)	29 & 30 Vict. c. 2	20 February 1866
An Act to amend the Law relating to Contagious or Infections Diseases in Cattle and other Animals. (Repealed by Contagious Diseases (Animals) Act 1869 (32 & 33 Vict. c. 70))
Telegraph Act Amendment Act 1866 (repealed)	29 & 30 Vict. c. 3	6 March 1866
An Act to amend the Telegraph Act, 1863. (Note: Telegraph Act 1863 (26 & 27 Vict. c. 112)) (Repealed by Post Office Act 1969 (c. 48))
Cattle Disease Act (Ireland) 1866 or the Cattle Disease (Ireland) Act 1866 (repealed)	29 & 30 Vict. c. 4	6 March 1866
An Act to amend the Law relating to Contagious Diseases amongst Cattle and other Animals in Ireland. (Repealed by Contagious Diseases (Animals) Act 1878 (41 & 42 Vict. c. 74))
Savings Bank Investment Act 1866 (repealed)	29 & 30 Vict. c. 5	13 March 1866
An Act for amending the Laws relating to the Investments on account of Savings Banks and Post Office Savings Banks. (Repealed by Post Office Savings Bank Act 1954 (2 & 3 Eliz. 2. c. 62) and Trustee Savings Banks Act 1954 (2 & 3 Eliz. 2. c. 63))
Supply Act 1866 (repealed)	29 & 30 Vict. c. 6	13 March 1866
An Act to apply the Sum of One million one hundred and thirty-seven thousand seven hundred and seventy-two Pounds out of the Consolidated Fund to the Service of the Year ending the Thirty-first Day of March One thousand eight hundred and sixty-six. (Repealed by Statute Law Revision Act 1875 (38 & 39 Vict. c. 66))
Annuity, Princess Helena Act 1866 (repealed)	29 & 30 Vict. c. 7	23 March 1866
An Act to enable Her Majesty to settle an Annuity on Her Royal Highness the Princess Helena Augusta Victoria. (Repealed by Statute Law Revision Act 1953 (2 & 3 Eliz. 2. c. 5))
Annuity, Duke of Edinburgh Act 1866 (repealed)	29 & 30 Vict. c. 8	23 March 1866
An Act to enable Her Majesty to provide for the Support and Maintenance of His Royal Highness Prince Alfred Ernest Albert on his coming of Age. (Repealed by Statute Law Revision Act 1953 (2 & 3 Eliz. 2. c. 5))
Mutiny Act 1866 (repealed)	29 & 30 Vict. c. 9	23 March 1866
An Act for punishing Mutiny and Desertion, and for the better Payment of the Army and their Quarters. (Repealed by Statute Law Revision Act 1875 (38 & 39 Vict. c. 66))
Marine Mutiny Act 1866 (repealed)	29 & 30 Vict. c. 10	23 March 1866
An Act for the Regulation of Her Majesty's Royal Marine Forces while on shore. (Repealed by Statute Law Revision Act 1875 (38 & 39 Vict. c. 66))
National Debt Reduction Act 1866	29 & 30 Vict. c. 11	23 March 1866
An Act for the Cancellation of certain Capital Stocks of Annuities standing in the Names of the Commissioners for the Reduction of the National Debt.
Jamaica Act 1866 (repealed)	29 & 30 Vict. c. 12	23 March 1866
An Act to make Provision for the Government of Jamaica. (Repealed by West Indies Act 1962 (10 & 11 Eliz. 2. c. 19))
Consolidated Fund Act (19,000,000l.) or the Supply (No. 2) Act 1866 (repealed)	29 & 30 Vict. c. 13	23 March 1866
An Act to apply the Sum of Nineteen Millions out of the Consolidated Fund to the Service of the Year One thousand eight hundred and sixty-six. (Repealed by Statute Law Revision Act 1875 (38 & 39 Vict. c. 66))
County Courts Act 1866 (repealed)	29 & 30 Vict. c. 14	23 April 1866
An Act for the Abolition of the Offices of Treasurer and of High Bailiff of County Courts as Vacancies shall occur, and to provide for the Payment of future Registrars of County Courts. (Repealed by County Courts Act 1888 (51 & 52 Vict. c. 43))
Cattle Disease Act 1866 (repealed)	29 & 30 Vict. c. 15	23 April 1866
An Act to amend the Act of the Eleventh and Twelfth Years of Her present Majesty, Chapter One hundred and seven, (Note: Contagious Disorders (Sheep), etc. Act 1848 (11 & 12 Vict. c. 107)) to prevent the spreading of Contagious or Infectious Disorders among Sheep, Cattle, and other Animals. (Repealed by Contagious Diseases (Animals) Act 1869 (32 & 33 Vict. c. 70))
Art Act 1866 (repealed)	29 & 30 Vict. c. 16	30 April 1866
An Act for facilitating the public Exhibition of Works of Art in certain Exhibitions. (Repealed by Statute Law Revision Act 1875 (38 & 39 Vict. c. 66))
Cattle Sheds in Burghs (Scotland) Act 1866 (repealed)	29 & 30 Vict. c. 17	30 April 1866
An Act to regulate the Inspection of Cattle Sheds, Cowhouses, and Byres within Burghs and populous Places in Scotland. (Repealed by Local Government (Scotland) Act 1973 (c. 65))
India Military Funds Act 1866 (repealed)	29 & 30 Vict. c. 18	30 April 1866
An Act to make Provision for the Transfer of the Assets, Liabilities, and Management of the Bengal, Madras, and Bombay Military Funds, the Bengal Military Orphan Society, and other Funds, to the Secretary of State for India in Council. (Repealed by Statute Law (Repeals) Act 1981 (c. 19))
Parliamentary Oaths Act 1866	29 & 30 Vict. c. 19	30 April 1866
An Act to amend the Law relating to Parliamentary Oaths.
Forsyth's Indemnity Act 1866 (repealed)	29 & 30 Vict. c. 20	30 April 1866
An Act to indemnify William Forsyth Esquire, One of Her Majesty's Counsel, from any penal Consequences which he may have incurred by sitting or voting as a Member of the House of Commons while holding the Office of Standing Counsel to the Secretary of State in Council of India. (Repealed by Statute Law Revision Act 1875 (38 & 39 Vict. c. 66))
Public Offices Site Act 1866	29 & 30 Vict. c. 21	18 May 1866
An Act to authorize the Commissioners of Her Majesty's Works and Public Buildings to acquire by compulsory Purchase or otherwise certain Lands, Houses, and Premises in the Parish of Saint Margaret, Westminster; and for other Purposes.
Declarations Before Taking Office Act 1866 (repealed)	29 & 30 Vict. c. 22	18 May 1866
An Act to render it unnecessary to make and subscribe certain Declarations as a Qualification for Offices and Employments; to indemnify such Persons as have omitted to qualify themselves for Office and Employment; and for other Purposes relating thereto. (Repealed by Promissory Oaths Act 1871 (34 & 35 Vict. c. 48))
Isle of Man Customs, Harbours, and Public Purposes Act 1866 (repealed)	29 & 30 Vict. c. 23	18 May 1866
An Act to alter certain Duties of Customs in the Isle of Man, and for other Purposes. (Repealed by Isle of Man Act 1958 (6 & 7 Eliz. 2. c. 11))
Local Government Supplemental Act 1866	29 & 30 Vict. c. 24	18 May 1866
An Act to confirm certain Provisional Orders under "The Local Government Act, 1858," (Note: Local Government Act 1858 (21 & 22 Vict. c. 98)) relating to the Districts of Winchester, Burton-upon-Trent, Longton, Accrington, Preston, Bangor, Elland, Halstead, Wadsworth, Canterbury, Dartmouth, Dukinfield, Stroud, and Bridlington, and for other Purposes relative to certain Districts under the said Act.
	Provisional Order repealing and altering Parts of Local Acts in force within the District of the Winchester Local Board.	
	Provisional Order for the Alteration of the Town of Burton-upon-Trent Act, 1853, (Note: Town of Burton-upon-Trent Act 1853 (16 & 17 Vict. c. cxviii)) in force within the District of the Burton-upon-Trent Local Board.	
	Provisional Order repealing and altering Parts of Local Act (Note: Staffordshire Potteries Improvement and Police Act 1839 (2 & 3 Vict. c. xliv)) in force within the District of the Longton Local Board.	
	Provisional Order putting in force the Lands Clauses Consolidation Act, 1845, (Note: Lands Clauses Consolidation Act 1845 (8 & 9 Vict. c. 18)) within the District of Accrington, in the County of Lancaster, for the Purchase of Lands by the Local Board of Health of the aforesaid District for Market Improvements.	
	Provisional Order putting in force the Lands Clauses Consolidation Act, 1845, within the District of the Preston Local Board of Health, for the Purchase of Lands by the said Board for Park and Street Improvements.	
	Provisional Order for altering the Boundaries of the District of Bangor in the County of Carnarvon under the Provisions of the Local Government Act, 1858.	
	Provisional Order altering the Boundaries of the District of Elland in the County of York, under the Provisions of the Local Government Aet, 1858.	
	Provisional Order for altering the Boundaries of the District of Halstead in the County of Essex, under the Provisions of the Local Government Act, 1858.	
	Provisional Order for separating from the District of Wadsworth in the County of York a portion of the Township of Wadsworth.	
	Provisional Order for repeal and alteration of the Canterbury Local Acts in force within the District of the Canterbury Local Board.	
	Provisional Order for extending the Borrowing Powers of the Dartmouth Local Board.	
	Provisional Order for extending the Borrowing Powers of the Dukinfield Local Board of Health.	
	Provisional Order for extending the Borrowing Powers of the Stroud Local Board of Health.	
	Provisional Order for extending the Borrowing Powers of the Bridlington Local Board (E. R. Yorkshire).	
Exchequer Bills and Bonds Act 1866 (repealed)	29 & 30 Vict. c. 25	18 May 1866
An Act to consolidate and amend the several Laws regulating the Preparation, Issue, and Payment of Exchequer Bills and Bonds. (Repealed by Statute Law Revision Act 1966 (c. 5))
Landed Property Improvement (Ireland) Act 1866	29 & 30 Vict. c. 26	18 May 1866
An Act to secure the Repayment of Public Monies advanced for the Drainage and Improvement of Lands and other like Objects in Ireland.
Portsmouth and Chatham Dockyards Act 1866	29 & 30 Vict. c. 27	18 May 1866
An Act to amend The Dockyard Extensions Act, 1865. (Note: Dockyard Extensions Act 1865 (28 & 29 Vict. c. 51))
Labouring Classes Dwelling Houses Act 1866 or the Labouring Classes Dwellings Act 1866 (repealed)	29 & 30 Vict. c. 28	18 May 1866
An Act to enable the Public Works Loan Commissioners to make Advances towards the Erection of Dwellings for the Labouring Classes. (Repealed by Housing of the Working Classes Act 1890 (53 & 54 Vict. c. 70))
Annual Inclosure Act 1866	29 & 30 Vict. c. 29	18 May 1866
An Act to authorize the Inclosure of certain Lands in pursuance of a Report of the Inclosure Commissioners for England and Wales.
Harbour Loans Act 1866 (repealed)	29 & 30 Vict. c. 30	18 May 1866
An Act to amend the Harbours and Passing Tolls, &c. Act, 1861. (Note: Harbours and Passing Tolls, &c. Act 1861) (Repealed by National Loans Act 1968 (c. 13))
Superannuation (Metropolis) Act 1866 (repealed)	29 & 30 Vict. c. 31	18 May 1866
An Act to provide for Superannuation Allowances to Officers of Vestries and other Boards within the Area of the Metropolis Local Management Act. (Repealed by Statute Law (Repeals) Act 1976 (c. 16))
Matrimonial Causes Act 1866 (repealed)	29 & 30 Vict. c. 32	11 June 1866
An Act further to mend the Procedure and Powers of the Court for Divorce and Matrimonial Causes. (Repealed by Supreme Court of Judicature (Consolidation) Act 1925 (15 & 16 Geo. 5. c. 49))
Land Drainage Supplemental Act 1866 (repealed)	29 & 30 Vict. c. 33	11 June 1866
An Act to confirm a Provisional Order under "The Land Drainage Act, 1861." (Note: Land Drainage Act 1861 (24 & 25 Vict. c. 133)) (Repealed by Statute Law (Repeals) Act 1993 (c. 50))
	In the Matter of Frodsham and Ince Improvement, situate in the several Parishes of Frodsham, Lice, and Thornton in the Moors in the County of Chester.	
Cattle Assurance Act 1866 (repealed)	29 & 30 Vict. c. 34	11 June 1866
An Act to give further Facilities for the Establishment of Societies for the Assurance of Cattle and other Animals. (Repealed by Friendly Societies Act 1875 (38 & 39 Vict. c. 60))
Contagious Diseases Act 1866 (repealed)	29 & 30 Vict. c. 35	11 June 1866
An Act for the better Prevention of Contagious Diseases at certain Naval and Military Stations. (Repealed by Contagious Diseases Acts Repeal Act 1886 (49 & 50 Vict. c. 10))
Revenue Act 1866 (repealed)	29 & 30 Vict. c. 36	11 June 1866
An Act to grant, alter, and repeal certain Duties of Customs and Inland Revenue, and for other Purposes relating thereto. (Repealed by Income Tax Act 1918 (8 & 9 Geo. 5. c. 40))
Hop (Prevention of Frauds) Act 1866 (repealed)	29 & 30 Vict. c. 37	11 June 1866
An Act to amend an Act of the Fifty-fourth Year of King George the Third, Chapter One hundred and twenty-three, (Note: Hop Trade Act 1814 (54 Geo. 3. c. 123)) to prevent Frauds and Abuses in the Trade of Hops. (Repealed by Hops Certification Regulations 1979 (SI 1979/1095))
Poor Persons Burial (Ireland) Act 1866 (repealed)	29 & 30 Vict. c. 38	11 June 1866
An Act to enable Boards of Guardians in Ireland to provide Coffins and Shrouds for the Burial of poor Persons who at the Time of their Death were not in receipt of Relief from the Poor Rates. (Repealed by Welfare Services Act (Northern Ireland) 1949 (c. 1 (N.I.)))
Exchequer and Audit Departments Act 1866	29 & 30 Vict. c. 39	28 June 1866
An Act to consolidate the Duties of the Exchequer and Audit Departments. to regulate the Receipt, Custody, and Issue of Public Moneys, and to provide for the Audit of the Accounts thereof.
Drainage and Improvement of Land (Ireland) Act 1866 (repealed)	29 & 30 Vict. c. 40	28 June 1866
An Act to authorize a further Advance of Money for the Purposes of Improvement of Landed Property in Ireland. (Repealed by Statute Law Revision Act 1893 (56 & 57 Vict. c. 14) and Public Works &c Loans Act (Northern Ireland) 1953 (c. 13 (N.I.)))
Nuisances Removal Act (No. 1) 1866 or the Nuisances Removal (No. 1) Act 1866 (repealed)	29 & 30 Vict. c. 41	28 June 1866
An Act to amend the Nuisances Removal and Diseases Prevention Act, 1860. (Note: Nuisances Removal Act 1860 (23 & 24 Vict. c. 77)) (Repealed by Public Health Act 1875 (38 & 39 Vict. c. 55), Public Health (Ireland) Act 1878 (41 & 42 Vict. c. 52) and Public Health (London) Act 1891 (54 & 55 Vict. c. 76))
Life Insurance (Ireland) Act 1866	29 & 30 Vict. c. 42	28 June 1866
An Act to amend the Law relating to Life Insurances in Ireland.
Naval Savings Banks Act 1866 (repealed)	29 & 30 Vict. c. 43	28 June 1866
An Act for the Establishment and Regulation of Savings Banks for Seamen and Marines of the Royal Navy. (Repealed by Savings Banks Act 1949 (12, 13 & 14 Geo. 6. c. 13))
Labouring Classes Lodging Houses and Dwellings Act (Ireland) 1866 or the Labouring Classes Lodging Houses and Dwellings (Ireland) Act 1866 (repealed)	29 & 30 Vict. c. 44	28 June 1866
An Act to encourage the Establishment of Lodging Houses for the Labouring Classes in Ireland. (Repealed by Housing of the Working Classes Act 1890 (53 & 54 Vict. c. 70))
Piers and Harbours (Ireland) Act 1866 (repealed)	29 & 30 Vict. c. 45	28 June 1866
An Act to extend the Provisions of the Acts for the Encouragement of the Sea Fisheries in Ireland, by promoting and aiding with Grants of Public Money the Construction of Piers, Harbours, and other Works. (Repealed by Statute Law Revision Act 1893 (56 & 57 Vict. c. 14) and Public Works &c Loans Act (Northern Ireland) 1953 (c. 13 (N.I.)))
Belfast Constabulary Act 1866 (repealed)	29 & 30 Vict. c. 46	28 June 1866
An Act to authorize the Town Council of Belfast to levy and pay Charges in respect of extra Constabulary. (Repealed by Statute Law Revision Act (Northern Ireland) 1954 (c. 35 (N.I.)))
Indian Prize Money Act 1866 (repealed)	29 & 30 Vict. c. 47	28 June 1866
An Act to legalize the Payment and Distribution of Indian Prize Money by the Treasurer or Secretary of Chelsea Hospital, and to amend an Act (Note: Army Prize Money Act 1832 (2 & 3 Will. 4. c. 53)) for the consolidating and amending the Law relating to the Payment of Army Prize Money. (Repealed by Statute Law Revision Act 1959 (7 & 8 Eliz. 2. c. 68))
Annuity, Princess Mary of Cambridge Act 1866 (repealed)	29 & 30 Vict. c. 48	28 June 1866
An Act to enable Her Majesty to settle an Annuity on Her Royal Highness the Princess Mary Adelaide Wilhelmina Elizabeth of Cambridge. (Repealed by Statute Law Revision Act 1953 (2 & 3 Eliz. 2. c. 5))
Drainage Maintenance Act 1866 (repealed)	29 & 30 Vict. c. 49	16 July 1866
An Act to provide for the better Maintenance of Works executed under the Acts for the Drainage of Lands in Ireland. (Repealed by Erne Drainage and Development Act (Northern Ireland) 1950 (c. 15 (N.I.)))
Burial in Burghs (Scotland) Act 1866 (repealed)	29 & 30 Vict. c. 50	16 July 1866
An Act to revive Section Sixty-nine of "The Nuisances Removal (Scotland) Act, 1856," (Note: Nuisances Removal (Scotland) Act 1856 (19 & 20 Vict. c. 103)) relating to Burials in Burghs. (Repealed by Statute Law Revision Act 1893 (56 & 57 Vict. c. 14))
Lunacy (Scotland) Act 1866 (repealed)	29 & 30 Vict. c. 51	16 July 1866
An Act to amend the Acts relating to Lunacy in Scotland, and to make further Provision for the Care and Treatment of Lunatics. (Repealed by Mental Health (Scotland) Act 1960 (8 & 9 Eliz. 2. c. 61))
Prosecutions Expenses Act 1866 (repealed)	29 & 30 Vict. c. 52	23 July 1866
An Act to extend the Law relating to the Expenses of Prosecutions, and to make Provision for Expenses on Charges of Felony and certain Misdemeanors before examining Magistrates. (Repealed by Statute Law Revision Act 1950 (14 Geo. 6. c. 6))
Sheriff Court Houses (Scotland) Act 1866 (repealed)	29 & 30 Vict. c. 53	30 July 1866
An Act to amend certain Provisions of the Sheriff Court Houses (Scotland) Act, 1860. (Note: Sheriff Court Houses Act 1860 (23 & 24 Vict. c. 79)) (Repealed by Sheriff Courts (Scotland) Act 1971 (c. 58))
Revising Barristers Act 1866 (repealed)	29 & 30 Vict. c. 54	30 July 1866
An Act to amend the Law relating to the Qualifications of Revising Barristers. (Repealed by Representation of the People Act 1918 (7 & 8 Geo. 5. c. 64))
Post Office (Postmaster-General) Act 1866 (repealed)	29 & 30 Vict. c. 55	30 July 1866
An Act to enable the Postmaster General to sit in the House of Commons. (Repealed by Ministers of the Crown Act 1937 (1 Edw. 8 & 1 Geo. 6. c. 38))
Pier and Harbour Orders Confirmation Act 1866 (No. 2) or the Pier and Harbour Orders Confirmation (No. 2) Act 1866	29 & 30 Vict. c. 56	30 July 1866
An Act for confirming certain Provisional Orders made by the Board of Trade under The General Pier and Harbour Act, 1861, (Note: General Pier and Harbour Act 1861 (24 & 25 Vict. c. 45)) relating to Clynder, Hastings, and Newlyn.
	Clynder Pier Order 1866 Order for the Construction, Maintenance, and Regulation of a Pier at Clynder, in the Parish of Roseneath, in the County of Dumbarton.	
	Hastings Harbour (Alexandra Pier) Order 1866 Order for the Construction of an additional Pier at Hastings, in the County of Sussex, by the Hastings Harbour Company, and for other Purposes.	
	Newlyn Pier and Harbour Order 1866 Order for the Construction, Maintenance, and Regulation of a Pier and Harbour at Newlyn, in the County of Cornwall.	
Charitable Trusts Deeds Enrolment Act 1866 (repealed)	29 & 30 Vict. c. 57	30 July 1866
An Act to make further Provision for the Enrolment of certain Deeds, Assurances, and other Instruments relating to Charitable Trusts. (Repealed by Mortmain and Charitable Uses Act 1888 (51 & 52 Vict. c. 42))
Pier and Harbour Orders Confirmation Act 1866	29 & 30 Vict. c. 58	6 August 1866
An Act for confirming certain Provisional Orders made by the Board of Trade under The General Pier and Harbour Act, 1861, relating to Ardglass, Blackpool (South), Cowes (West), Dawlish, Hopeman, Hornsea, Llandudno, Penzance, Plymouth (Hoe), Redcar, and Scarborough.
	Ardglass Harbour Order 1866 Order for the Amendment of The Ardglass Harbour Order, 1864, and for the Improvement, Maintenance, and Regulation of the Harbour at Ardglass, in the County of Down.	
	South Blackpool Jetty Order 1866 Order for the Construction, Maintenance, and Regulation of a Pier at Blackpool, in the County Palatine of Lancaster.	
	West Cowes Pier Order 1866 Order for the Construction, Maintenance, and Regulation of a Pier at West Cowes in the Isle of Wight and County of Southampton.	
	Dawlish Pier Order 1866 Order for the Construction, Maintenance, and Regulation of a Pier at Dawlish, in the County of Devon.	
	Hopeman Harbour Order 1866 Order for the Improvement and Regulation of the Harbour of Hopeman in the Parish of Duffus and County of Elgin.	
	Hornsea Pier Order 1866 Order for the Construction, Maintenance, and Regulation of a Pier at Hornsea in the East Riding of the County of York.	
	Llandudno Pier Order 1866 Order for the Construction, Maintenance, and Regulation of a Pier at Llandudno in the County of Carnarvon.	
	Penzance Promenade Pier Order 1866 Order for the Construction, Maintenance, and Regulation of a Pier at Penzance in the County of Cornwall.	
	Plymouth (Hoe) Pier Order 1866 Order for the Construction, Maintenance, and Regulation of a Pier at Plymouth in the County of Devon.	
	Redcar Pier Order 1866 Order for the Construction, Maintenance, and Regulation of a Pier at Redcar in the County of York.	
	Scarborough Promenade Pier Order 1866 Order for the Construction, Maintenance, and Regulation of a Pier at Scarborough in the North Riding of the County of York.	
Land Tax Commissioners (Appointment) Act 1866 (repealed)	29 & 30 Vict. c. 59	6 August 1866
An Act to appoint additional Commissioners for executing the Acts for granting a Land Tax and other Rates and Taxes. (Repealed by Statute Law Revision Act 1950 (14 Geo. 6. c. 6))
Militia Pay Act 1866 (repealed)	29 & 30 Vict. c. 60	6 August 1866
An Act to defray the Charge of the Pay, Clothing, and contingent and other Expenses of the Disembodied Militia in Great Britain and Ireland; to grant Allowances in certain Cases to Subaltern Officers, Adjutants, Paymasters, Quartermasters, Surgeons, Assistant Surgeons, and Surgeons Mates of the Militia; and to authorize the Employment of the Non-commissioned Officers. (Repealed by Statute Law Revision Act 1875 (38 & 39 Vict. c. 66))
Drainage and Improvement of Lands Supplemental Act (Ireland) 1866 or the Drainage and Improvement of Lands Supplemental Act 1866	29 & 30 Vict. c. 61	6 August 1866
An Act to confirm a Provisional Order under The Drainage and Improvement of Lands Act (Ireland), (Note: Drainage and Improvement of Lands Act (Ireland) 1863 (26 & 27 Vict. c. 88)) and the Acts amending the same.
	In the Matter of the Connell Drainage District in the County of Kildore.	
Crown Lands Act 1866 (repealed)	29 & 30 Vict. c. 62	6 August 1866
An Act to amend the Law relating to the Woods, Forests, and Land Revenues of the Crown. (Repealed by Statute Law Revision Act 1875 (38 & 39 Vict. c. 66), Statute Law Revision Act 1893 (56 & 57 Vict. c. 14), Crown Lands Act 1894 (57 & 58 Vict. c. 43), Crown Lands Act 1927 (17 & 18 Geo. 5. c. 23), Coast Protection Act 1949 (12, 13 & 14 Geo. 6. c. 74), Statute Law Revision Act 1950 (14 Geo. 6. c. 6), Statute Law Revision Act 1958 (6 & 7 Eliz. 2. c. 46) and Crown Estate Act 1961 (9 & 10 Eliz. 2. c. 55))
Courts of Justice Act 1866 (repealed)	29 & 30 Vict. c. 63	6 August 1866
An Act to amend the Acts relating to the intended Courts of Justice. (Repealed by Statute Law Revision Act 1958 (6 & 7 Eliz. 2. c. 46))
Inland Revenue Act 1866 (repealed)	29 & 30 Vict. c. 64	6 August 1866
An Act to amend the Laws relating to the Inland Revenue. (Repealed by Revenue Act 1869 (32 & 33 Vict. c. 14), Inland Revenue Repeal Act 1870 (33 & 34 Vict. c. 99), Statute Law Revision Act 1875 (38 & 39 Vict. c. 66), Taxes Management Act 1880 (43 & 44 Vict. c. 19), Inland Revenue Act 1880 (43 & 44 Vict. c. 20), Spirits Act 1880 (43 & 44 Vict. c. 24), Hawkers Act 1888 (51 & 52 Vict. c. 33) and Customs and Inland Revenue Act 1890 (53 & 54 Vict. c. 8))
Colonial Branch Mint Act 1866 (repealed)	29 & 30 Vict. c. 65	6 August 1866
An Act to enable Her Majesty to declare Gold Coins to be issued from Her Majesty's Colonial Branch Mints a legal Tender for Payments; and for other Purposes relating thereto. (Repealed for the United Kingdom by Coinage Act 1870 (33 & 34 Vict. c. 10) and for the Isle of Man by Statute Law Revision (Isle of Man) Act 1991 (c. 61))
New Forest Poor Act (repealed)	29 & 30 Vict. c. 66	6 August 1866
An Act to provide for the Relief of the Poor in the New Forest. (Repealed by Statute Law Revision Act 1953 (2 & 3 Eliz. 2. c. 5))
British Columbia Act 1866	29 & 30 Vict. c. 67	6 August 1866
An Act for the Union of the Colony of Vancouver Island with the Colony of British Columbia.
Superannuation Act 1866 (repealed)	29 & 30 Vict. c. 68	6 August 1866
An Act to amend the Law relating to the granting of Pensions and Superannuation Allowances to Persons holding certain Offices connected with the Administration of Justice in England. (Repealed by Statute Law Revision Act 1893 (56 & 57 Vict. c. 14), Statute Law Revision Act 1950 (14 Geo. 6. c. 6) and Statute Law Revision Act 1953 (2 & 3 Eliz. 2. c. 5))
Carriage and Deposit of Dangerous Goods Act 1866 (repealed)	29 & 30 Vict. c. 69	6 August 1866
An Act for the Amendment of the Law with respect to the Carriage and Deposit of dangerous Goods. (Repealed by Explosives Act 1875 (38 & 39 Vict. c. 17))
Walmore and Bearce Commons, Forest of Dean Act 1866 or the Walmore and Bearce Inclosure Act 1866 (repealed)	29 & 30 Vict. c. 70	6 August 1866
An Act to extend the provisions for the inclosure, exchange and improvement of land in certain portions of the forest of Dean called Walmore Common and the Bearce Common, and for authorising allotments in lieu of the forestal rights of Her Majesty in and over such commons. (Repealed by Crown Estate Act 1961 (9 & 10 Eliz. 2. c. 55) and Wild Creatures and Forest Laws Act 1971 (c. 47))
Glebe Lands (Scotland) Act 1866 (repealed)	29 & 30 Vict. c. 71	6 August 1866
An Act to facilitate the letting on Lease, feuing, or selling Glebe Lands in Scotland. (Repealed by Abolition of Feudal Tenure etc. (Scotland) Act 2000 (asp 5))
Public Works Loans Act 1866 (repealed)	29 & 30 Vict. c. 72	6 August 1866
An Act to authorize Advances of Money out of the Consolidated Fund for carrying on Public Works and Fisheries and for the Employment of the Poor; and for the Purposes of The Harbours and Passing Tolls Act, 1861, (Note: Harbours and Passing Tolls, &c. Act 1861 (24 & 25 Vict. c. 47)) The Cattle Diseases Prevention Act, 1866, (Note: Cattle Diseases Prevention Act 1866 (29 & 30 Vict. c. 2)) and The Labouring Classes Dwellings Act, 1866. (Note: Labouring Classes Dwelling Houses Act 1866 (29 & 30 Vict. c. 28)) (Repealed by Public Works Loans Act 1875 (38 & 39 Vict. c. 89))
Public Works (Ireland) Act 1866 (repealed)	29 & 30 Vict. c. 73	6 August 1866
An Act to authorize for a further Period the Application of Money for the Purposes of Loans for carrying on Public Works in Ireland. (Repealed by Public Works Loans (Ireland) Act 1877 (40 & 41 Vict. c. 27), Statute Law Revision Act 1893 (56 & 57 Vict. c. 14) and Public Works &c Loans Act (Northern Ireland) 1953 (c. 13 (N.I.)))
Government of New South Wales and Van Diemen's Land Act 1866 (repealed)	29 & 30 Vict. c. 74	6 August 1866
An Act to repeal Part of an Act intituled "An Act for the Government of New South Wales and Van Diemen's Land." (Note: Australian Constitutions Act 1842 (5 & 6 Vict. c. 76)) (Repealed by Statute Law Revision Act 1894 (57 & 58 Vict. c. 56))
Parochial Buildings (Scotland) Act 1866 (repealed)	29 & 30 Vict. c. 75	6 August 1866
An Act to amend and explain the Act of the Twenty-fifth and Twenty-sixth Years of Victoria, Chapter Fifty-eight, (Note: Parochial Buildings (Scotland) Act 1862 (25 & 26 Vict. c. 58)) relating to Parochial Buildings in Scotland. (Repealed by Abolition of Feudal Tenure etc. (Scotland) Act 2000 (asp 5))
Public Offices Fees Act 1866 (repealed)	29 & 30 Vict. c. 76	6 August 1866
An Act to provide for the Collection of Fees in Public Departments and Offices by means of Stamps. (Repealed by Public Offices Fees Act 1879 (42 & 43 Vict. c. 58))
Parishes Quoad Sacra (Scotland) Act 1866 (repealed)	29 & 30 Vict. c. 77	6 August 1866
An Act to amend the Act of the Seventh and Eighth Years of Victoria, Chapter Forty-four, (Note: New Parishes (Scotland) Act 1844 (7 & 8 Vict. c. 44)) relating to the Erection of new Parishes quoad sacra in Scotland. (Repealed by United Parishes (Scotland) Act 1868 (31 & 32 Vict. c. 30))
County Rate Act 1866 (repealed)	29 & 30 Vict. c. 78	6 August 1866
An Act for removing Doubts respecting the Assessment of County Rates. (Repealed by Rating and Valuation Act 1925 (15 & 16 Geo. 5. c. 90) and Local Government Act 1948 (11 & 12 Geo. 6. c. 26))
Local Government Supplemental Act 1866 (No. 2) or the Local Government Supplemental (No. 2) Act 1866 (repealed)	29 & 30 Vict. c. 79	6 August 1866
An Act to confirm a Provisional Order under "The Local Government Act, 1858," relating to the District of Ventnor, and for the Repeal of the South Wales Highway Act in Briton Ferry District. (Repealed by Statute Law (Repeals) Act 1989 (c. 43) (Note: Incorrectly cited as "SLR 1875" in the Chronological Table of the Statutes.))
	Provisional Order repealing a Local Act (Note: Isle of Wight Highway Act 1813 (53 Geo. 3. c. xcii)) and repealing and altering part of another Local Act (Note: Ventnor Improvement Act 1844 (7 & 8 Vict. c. cv)) in force within the District of the Ventnor Local Board.	
Land Drainage Supplemental Act 1866 Number 2 or the Land Drainage Supplemental (No. 2) Act 1866 (repealed)	29 & 30 Vict. c. 80	6 August 1866
An Act to confirm a Provisional Order under "The Land Drainage Act, 1861." (Repealed by Statute Law (Repeals) Act 1993 (c. 50))
	In the matter of Northmoor and Stanton Harcourt Improvement, situate in the several Parishes of Northmoor, Stanton Harcourt, and Standlake, in the County of Oxford.	
Ecclesiastical Leases (Isle of Man) Act 1866 (repealed)	29 & 30 Vict. c. 81	6 August 1866
An Act to amend the Law respecting Leases by Ecclesiastical Corporations, as far as relates to the Isle of Man. (Repealed by Statute Law Revision Act 1893 (56 & 57 Vict. c. 14))
Standards of Weights, Measures, and Coinage Act 1866 (repealed)	29 & 30 Vict. c. 82	6 August 1866
An Act to amend the Acts relating to the Standard Weights and Measures and to the Standard Trial Pieces of the Coin of the Realm. (Repealed by Weights and Measures Act 1878 (41 & 42 Vict. c. 49))
National Gallery Enlargement Act 1866	29 & 30 Vict. c. 83	6 August 1866
An Act to provide for the Acquisition of a Site for the Enlargement of the National Gallery.
Attorneys and Solicitors Act (Ireland) 1866 or the Attorneys and Solicitors (Ireland) Act 1866 (repealed)	29 & 30 Vict. c. 84	6 August 1866
An Act to amend the Laws for the Regulation of the Profession of Attorneys and Solicitors in Ireland and to assimilate them to those in England. (Repealed by Solicitors (Ireland) Act 1898 (61 & 62 Vict. c. 17))
Oyster and Mussel Fisheries Act 1866 (repealed)	29 & 30 Vict. c. 85	6 August 1866
An Act to facilitate the Establishment, Improvement, and Maintenance of Oyster and Mussel Fisheries in Great Britain. (Repealed by Sea Fisheries Act 1868 (31 & 32 Vict. c. 45))
Rochdale Vicarage Act 1866	29 & 30 Vict. c. 86	6 August 1866
An Act for vesting the Glebe Lands of the Vicarage of Rochdale in the County of Lancaster in the Ecclesiastical Commissioners for England, and for making Provision for the Endowment of the said Vicarage in lieu thereof; and for the Promotion of other Ecclesiastical Purposes connected therewith.
Foreign Jurisdiction Act Amendment Act 1866 (repealed)	29 & 30 Vict. c. 87	6 August 1866
An Act to amend the Foreign Jurisdiction Act. (Note: Foreign Jurisdiction Act 1843 (6 & 7 Vict. c. 94)) (Repealed by Foreign Jurisdiction Act 1890 (53 & 54 Vict. c. 37))
Oyster Beds (Ireland) Act 1866 (repealed)	29 & 30 Vict. c. 88	6 August 1866
An Act to validate certain Licences granted in Ireland for the Establishment of Oyster Beds. (Repealed by Fisheries Act (Northern Ireland) 1966 (c. 17 (N.I.)))
Thames Navigation Act 1866 (repealed)	29 & 30 Vict. c. 89	6 August 1866
An Act for vesting in the Conservators of the River Thames the Conservancy of the Thames and Isis from Staines in the County of Middlesex to Crichlade in the County of Wilts; and for other Purposes connected therewith. (Repealed by Thames Conservancy Act 1894 (57 & 58 Vict. c. clxxxvii))
Sanitary Act 1866 or the Public Health Act 1866 (repealed)	29 & 30 Vict. c. 90	7 August 1866
An Act to amend the Law relating to the Public Health. (Repealed for Scotland by Public Health (Scotland) Act 1867 (30 & 31 Vict. c. 101), for England and Wales by Public Health Act 1875 (38 & 39 Vict. c. 55), for Ireland by Public Health (Ireland) Act 1878 (41 & 42 Vict. c. 52) and for London by Public Health (London) Act 1891 (54 & 55 Vict. c. 76), Public Health Act 1896 (59 & 60 Vict. c. 19) and Public Health (London) Act 1936 (26 Geo. 5 & 1 Edw. 8. c. 50))
Appropriation Act 1866 (repealed)	29 & 30 Vict. c. 91	10 August 1866
An Act to apply a Sum out of the Consolidated Fund and the Surplus of Ways and Means to the Service of the Year ending Thirty-first March One thousand eight hundred and sixty-seven, and to appropriate the Supplies granted in this Session of Parliament. (Repealed by Statute Law Revision Act 1875 (38 & 39 Vict. c. 66))
Turnpikes, Provisional Orders Confirmation Act 1866 (repealed)	29 & 30 Vict. c. 92	10 August 1866
An Act to confirm certain Provisional Orders made under an Act of the Fifteenth Tear of Her present Majesty, (Note: Turnpike Trusts (Making of Provisional Orders) Act 1851 (14 & 15 Vict. c. 38)) to facilitate Arrangements for the Relief of Turnpike Trusts. (Repealed by Statute Law (Repeals) Act 1981 (c. 19))
General Police and Improvement (Scotland) Supplemental Act 1866 (repealed)	29 & 30 Vict. c. 93	10 August 1866
An Act to confirm a Provisional Order under "The General Police and Improvement (Scotland) Act, 1862," (Note: General Police and Improvement (Scotland) Act 1862 (25 & 26 Vict. c. 101)) relating to the Burgh of Aberdeen. (Repealed by Aberdeen Corporation (Streets Buildings Sewers &c.) Order Confirmation Act 1936 (26 Geo. 5 & 1 Edw. 8. c. lxxvii) and Aberdeen Corporation (Administration Finance &c.) Order Confirmation Act 1940 (3 & 4 Geo. 6. c. iii))
	Aberdeen.	
Second Annual Inclosure Act 1866	29 & 30 Vict. c. 94	10 August 1866
An Act to authorize the Inclosure of certain Lands in pursuance of a Report of the Inclosure Commissioners for England and Wales.
Railway Companies (Ireland) Temporary Advances Act 1866 (repealed)	29 & 30 Vict. c. 95	10 August 1866
An Act to enable the Public Works Loan Commissioners to make temporary Advances to Railway Companies in Ireland. (Repealed by Statute Law Revision Act 1875 (38 & 39 Vict. c. 66), Statute Law Revision Act 1893 (56 & 57 Vict. c. 14) and Public Works &c Loans Act (Northern Ireland) 1953 (c. 13 (N.I.)))
Bills of Sale Act 1866 (repealed)	29 & 30 Vict. c. 96	10 August 1866
An Act to amend the Bills of Sale Act, 1854. (Note: Bills of Sale Act 1854 (17 & 18 Vict. c. 36)) (Repealed by Bills of Sale Act 1878 (41 & 42 Vict. c. 31))
Oyster Fishery (Ireland) Amendment Act 1866 (repealed)	29 & 30 Vict. c. 97	10 August 1866
An Act further to promote the Cultivation of Oysters in Ireland, and to amend the Acts for that Purpose. (Repealed by Fisheries Act (Northern Ireland) 1966 (c. 17 (N.I.)))
Portsmouth and Chatham Dockyards (No. 2) Act 1866	29 & 30 Vict. c. 98	10 August 1866
An Act to extend the Duration of The Dockyard Extensions Act (1865).
Landed Estates Court Act 1866 or the Landed Estates Court (Ireland) Act 1866	29 & 30 Vict. c. 99	10 August 1866
An Act to reduce the Number of Judges in the Landed Estates Court in Ireland, and to reduce the Duties payable under the Record of Title and Land Debentures Acts.
Prisons Act 1866 (repealed)	29 & 30 Vict. c. 100	10 August 1866
An Act for the Amendment of the Laws relating to Prisons. (Repealed by Statute Law Revision Act 1893 (56 & 57 Vict. c. 14))
Common Law Courts (Fees and Salaries) Act 1866 (repealed)	29 & 30 Vict. c. 101	10 August 1866
An Act to make further Provision respecting the Fees payable in the Superior Courts of Law at Westminster, and in the Offices belonging thereto, and respecting the Salaries of certain Officers of those Courts. (Repealed by Supreme Court of Judicature (Officers) Act 1879 (42 & 43 Vict. c. 78))
Expiring Laws Continuance Act 1866 (repealed)	29 & 30 Vict. c. 102	10 August 1866
An Act to continue various expiring Acts. (Repealed by Statute Law Revision Act 1875 (38 & 39 Vict. c. 66))
Constabulary (Ireland) Act 1866 (repealed)	29 & 30 Vict. c. 103	10 August 1866
An Act to amend an Act to consolidate the Laws relating to the Constabulary Force in Ireland. (Repealed by Statute Law (Repeals) Act 1993 (c. 50))
New Zealand Loans Act 1866 (repealed)	29 & 30 Vict. c. 104	10 August 1866
An Act to guarantee the Liquidation of Bonds issued for the Repayment of Advances made out of Public Funds for the Service of the Colony of New Zealand. (Repealed by Statute Law Revision Act 1875 (38 & 39 Vict. c. 66), Statute Law Revision Act 1894 (57 & 58 Vict. c. 56) and Statute Law Revision Act 1950 (14 Geo. 6. c. 6))
Annual Turnpike Acts Continuance Act 1866 or the Turnpike Acts Continuance Act 1866 (repealed)	29 & 30 Vict. c. 105	10 August 1866
An Act to continue certain Turnpike Acts in Great Britain, and to make further Provision concerning Turnpike Roads. (Repealed by Statute Law (Repeals) Act 1981 (c. 19))
Local Government Supplemental Act 1866 (No. 3) or the Local Government Supplemental (No. 3) Act 1866	29 & 30 Vict. c. 106	10 August 1866
An Act to confirm certain Provisional Orders under "The Local Government Act, 1858," relating to the Districts of West Hartlepool, Tormoham, Harrogate, St. Leonard, Wednesfield, Aberdare, Bristol, Derby, Shrewsbury, Netherthong, Hove, New Windsor, Hanley, Burnley, and Accrington; and for other Purposes relative to certain Districts under the said Act.
	Provisional Order for Repeal and Alteration of the West Hartlepool Local Act (Note: West Hartlepool Improvement Act 1854 (17 & 18 Vict. c. xli)) in force within the District of the West Hartlepool Improvement Commissioners.	
	Provisional Order repealing and altering Parts of the Torquay Waterworks Act, 1856, (Note: Torquay Waterworks Act 1856 (19 & 20 Vict. c. lxxviii)) in force within the District of the Tormoham Local Board of Health, and for other Purposes herein set forth—Local Government Act, 1858, Sec. 77.	
	Provisional Order for the Alteration of the Harrogate Improvement Act, 1841, (Note: Harrogate Improvement Act 1841 (4 & 5 Vict. c. xvi)) in force within the District of Harrogate, in the County of York, under the Local Government Act, 1858.	
	Provisional Order for the Alteration and Amendment of the St. Leonard's Improvement Act, 1832, (Note: St. Leonards Improvement Act 1832 (2 & 3 Will. 4. c. xlv)) in force within the District of the St. Leonard's Local Board.	
	Provisional Order for altering the Boundaries of the District of Wednesfield in the County of Stafford, under the Provisions of the Local Government Act, 1858.	
	Provisional Order for altering the Boundaries (Note: Separating Mountain Ash from the District of Aberdare.) of the District of Aberdare in the County of Glamorgan, under the Provisions of the Local Government Act, 1858.	
	Provisional Order putting in force the Lands Clauses Consolidation Act, 1845, within the District of the Bristol Local Board of Health, for the Purchase of Lands by the said Board for Street Improvements.	
	Provisional Order putting in force the Lands Clauses Consolidation Act, 1845, within the District of Derby in the County of Derby, for the Purchase of Lands by the Local Board of Health for the aforesaid District for Street Improvements.	
	Provisional Order putting in force the Lands Clauses Consolidation Act, 1845, within the District of the Shrewsbury Local Board of Health, for the Purchase of Lands by the said Board for Market and Street Improvements.	
	Provisional Order putting in force the Lands Clauses Consolidation Act, 1845, within the District of the Netherthong Local Board, for the Purchase of Lands by the said Board for Road Improvements.	
	Provisional Order putting in force the Lands Clauses Consolidation Act, 1845, within the District of West Hove, in the County of Sussex, for the Purchase of Lands in the aforesaid District for Street Improvements, &c.	
	Provisional Order putting in force the Lands Clauses Consolidation Act, 1845, within the District of the New Windsor Local Board of Health, for the Purchase of Lands by the said Board for Road Improvements.	
	Provisional Order putting in force the Lands Clauses Consolidation Act, 1845, within the District of the Hanley Local Board for the Purchase of Lands by the said Board for Street Improvements.	
	Provisional Order putting in force the Lands Clauses Consolidation Act, 1845, within the District of Burnley, in the County of Lancaster, for the Purchase of Lands by the Local Board of Health of the aforesaid District for Street Improvements.	
	Provisional Order putting in force the Lands Clauses Consolidation Act, 1845, within the District of Accrington, in the County of Lancaster, for the Purchase of Lands by the Local Board of Health of the aforesaid District for Market Improvements, &c.	
Local Government Supplemental Act 1866 (No. 4) or the Local Government Supplemental (No. 4) Act 1866	29 & 30 Vict. c. 107	10 August 1866
An Act to confirm certain Provisional Orders under "The Local Government Act, 1858," relating to the Districts of Ramsgate, Leominster, Stalybridge, Lincoln, Maidstone, Banbury, Tunbridge Wells, Bedford, and Southampton; and for other Purposes relative to Districts under the said Act.
	Provisional Order for the Alteration and Amendment of the Ramsgate Improvement Act, 1838, (Note: Ramsgate Improvement Act 1838 (1 & 2 Vict. c. lxx)) in force within the District of the Ramsgate Local Board.	
	Provisional Order for the partial Repeal and Alteration of the Leominster Local Acts in force within the District of the Leominster Local Board.	
	Provisional Order repealing and altering Parts of Local Act in force within the District of the Stalybridge Local Board. (Note: Stalybridge Improvement and Police Act 1828 (9 Geo. 4. c. xxvi))	
	Provisional Order for the partial Repeal and Alteration of the Lincoln Local Act (Note: Lincoln Improvement Act 1828 (9 Geo. 4. c. xxvii)) in force within the District of the Lincoln Local Board.	
	Provisional Order repealing and altering Parts of Local Acts in force within the District of the Maidstone Local Board.	
	Provisional Order for the partial Repeal and Alteration of a Provisional Order applying the Public Health Act, 1848, (Note: Public Health Act 1848 (11 & 12 Vict. c. 63)) to the District of Banbury, and of the First Public Health Supplemental Act, 1852. (Note: First Public Health Supplemental Act 1852 (15 & 16 Vict. c. 42))	
	Provisional Order repealing and altering Parts of the Tunbridge Wells Provisional Order, and of the Local Government Supplemental Act, 1864 (No. 2), (Note: Local Government Supplemental Act 1864 (No. 2) (27 & 28 Vict. c. 83)) confirming the same.	
	Provisional Order putting in force the Lands Clauses Consolidation Act, 1845, within the District of the Bedford Local Board, for the Purchase of Lands by the said Board for purposes of Drainage and Water Supply.	
	Provisional Order for extending the Borrowing Powers of the Southampton Local Board of Health.	
Railway Companies Securities Act 1866 (repealed)	29 & 30 Vict. c. 108	10 August 1866
An Act to amend the Law relating to Securities issued by Railway Companies. (Repealed for England and Wales and Scotland by Transport Act 1962 (10 & 11 Eliz. 2. c. 46) and for Northern Ireland by Road Traffic, Transport and Roads (Northern Ireland) Order 1984 (SI 1984/1986 (N.I. 15)))
Naval Discipline Act 1866 (repealed)	29 & 30 Vict. c. 109	10 August 1866
An Act to make Provision for the Discipline of the Navy. (Repealed by Naval Discipline Act 1957 (5 & 6 Eliz. 2. c. 53))
Cattle Diseases Prevention Amendment Act 1866 (repealed)	29 & 30 Vict. c. 110	10 August 1866
An Act to amend the Cattle Diseases Prevention Act. (Repealed by Contagious Diseases (Animals) Act 1869 (32 & 33 Vict. c. 70))
Ecclesiastical Commissioners Act 1866	29 & 30 Vict. c. 111	10 August 1866
An Act to further amend the Acts relating to Ecclesiastical Commissioners for England.
Evidence (Scotland) Act 1866 (repealed)	29 & 30 Vict. c. 112	10 August 1866
An Act to make Provision in regard to the Mode of taking Evidence in Civil Causes in the Court of Session in Scotland. (Repealed by Court of Session Act 1988 (c. 36))
Poor Law Amendment Act 1866 or the Poor Law Amendment Act of 1866 (repealed)	29 & 30 Vict. c. 113	10 August 1866
An Act to amend the Act providing Superannuation Allowances to Officers of Unions and Parishes, and to make other Amendments in the Laws relating to the Relief of the Poor. (Repealed by Statute Law Revision Act 1966 (c. 5))
Public Libraries Amendment Act (England and Scotland) 1866 or the Public Libraries Amendment Act 1866 (repealed)	29 & 30 Vict. c. 114	10 August 1866
An Act to amend the Public Libraries Act. (Note: Public Libraries Act 1855 (18 & 19 Vict. c. 70)) (Repealed for Scotland by Public Libraries Act (Scotland) 1867 (30 & 31 Vict. c. 37) and for England and Wales by Public Libraries Act 1892 (55 & 56 Vict. c. 53))
Straits Settlements Act 1866 or the Government of the Straits Settlements Act 1866 or the Straits Settlements Government Act 1866 (repealed)	29 & 30 Vict. c. 115	10 August 1866
An Act to provide for the Government of the "Straits Settlements." (Repealed by Straits Settlements (Repeal) Act 1946 (9 & 10 Geo. 6. c. 37))
Indemnity Act 1866 (repealed)	29 & 30 Vict. c. 116	10 August 1866
An Act to indemnify such Persons in the United Kingdom as have omitted to qualify themselves for Offices and employments, and to extend the Time limited for those Purposes respectively. (Repealed by Promissory Oaths Act 1871 (34 & 35 Vict. c. 48))
Reformatory Schools Act 1866 (repealed)	29 & 30 Vict. c. 117	10 August 1866
An Act to consolidate and amend the Acts relating to Reformatory Schools in Great Britain. (Repealed by Children Act 1908 (8 Edw. 7. c. 67))
Industrial Schools Act 1866 (repealed)	29 & 30 Vict. c. 118	10 August 1866
An Act to consolidate and amend the Acts relating to Industrial Schools in Great Britain. (Repealed by Children Act 1908 (8 Edw. 7. c. 67) (Note: Incorrectly cited as "SLR 1875" in the Chronological Table of the Statutes.))
Habeas Corpus Suspension (Ireland) Act 1866 (repealed)	29 & 30 Vict. c. 119	10 August 1866
An Act to continue the Act of the Twenty-ninth Year of the Reign of Her present Majesty, Chapter One, intituled "An Act to empower the Lord Lieutenant or other Chief Governor or Governors of Ireland to apprehend and detain for a limited Time such Persons as he or they shall suspect of conspiring against Her Majesty's Person and Government." (Note: Habeas Corpus Suspension (Ireland) Act 1866 (29 & 30 Vict. c. 1)) (Repealed by Statute Law Revision Act 1875 (38 & 39 Vict. c. 66))
Patriotic Fund Act 1866 (repealed)	29 & 30 Vict. c. 120	10 August 1866
An Act to make Provision for the Administration of the Patriotic Fund. (Repealed by Patriotic Fund Act 1867 (30 & 31 Vict. c. 98))
Extradition Act 1866 (repealed)	29 & 30 Vict. c. 121	10 August 1866
An Act for the Amendment of the Law relating to Treaties of Extradition. (Repealed by Extradition Act 1870 (33 & 34 Vict. c. 52))
Metropolitan Commons Act 1866	29 & 30 Vict. c. 122	10 August 1866
An Act to make Provision for the Improvement, Protection, and Management of Commons near the Metropolis.

=== Local acts ===
Short title	Citation	Royal assent
Long title
Manchester Royal Exchange Act 1866	29 & 30 Vict. c. i	23 April 1866
An Act to enable the Proprietors of the Manchester Royal Exchange to pull down and rebuild the same; and for other Purposes with respect to the said Exchange.
Columbia (Bethnal Green) Market and Approaches Act 1866	29 & 30 Vict. c. ii	30 April 1866
An Act for the Establishment and Regulation of a Market near Columbia Square in the Parish of Saint Matthew, Bethnal Green, in the County of Middlesex, and the opening of a new Street, and the Improvement of Streets adjoining or near to the Market Place; and for other Purposes.
Central Wales Extension Railway Act 1866	29 & 30 Vict. c. iii	30 April 1866
An Act to extend the Time for the Completion of the Central Wales Extension Railway; and for other Purposes.
Banbury Gas Act 1866	29 & 30 Vict. c. iv	30 April 1866
An Act to incorporate the Banbury Gaslight and Coke Company (Limited), and to make further Provision for lighting Banbury and Places in the Neighbourhood thereof in the Counties of Oxford and Northampton with Gas.
Burry Port and Gwendreath Valley Railway Act 1866 (repealed)	29 & 30 Vict. c. v	30 April 1866
An Act for the Amalgamation of the Kidwelly and Burry Port Railway Company and the Burry Port Company; and for other Purposes. (Repealed by Burry Port Harbour Revision Order 2000 (SI 2000/2152))
West Middlesex Water Act 1866	29 & 30 Vict. c. vi	30 April 1866
An Act for extending the Limits within which the West Middlesex Waterworks Company may supply Water, and for other Purposes.
Derwent and Shotley Bridge Road Act 1866	29 & 30 Vict. c. vii	30 April 1866
An Act for repairing the Road from the Gateshead and Hexham Turnpike Road at or near to Axwell Park Gate on the River Derwent in the Township of Winlaton in the Parish of Ryton in the County of Durham to the Village of Shotley Bridge in the said County of Durham.
Cornwall County Lunatic Asylum (Supply of Water) Act 1866	29 & 30 Vict. c. viii	18 May 1866
An Act to authorize the Construction of Waterworks for the Supply of Water to the Lunatic Asylum for the County of Cornwall situate at Bodmin in the said County; and for other Purposes connected therewith.
Heywood Waterworks (Amendment) Act 1866 (repealed)	29 & 30 Vict. c. ix	18 May 1866
An Act to enable the Heywood Waterworks Company to raise additional Capital. (Repealed by Heywood and Middleton Water Board Act 1901 (1 Edw. 7. c. ccxxxvi))
North Eastern Railway (Gilling and Pickering Branch) Act 1866	29 & 30 Vict. c. x	18 May 1866
An Act to enable the North-eastern Railway Company to construct a Railway from Gilling to Helmsley and Pickering; and for other Purposes.
North Eastern Railway (County of Durham Lines) Act 1866	29 & 30 Vict. c. xi	18 May 1866
An Act to enable the North-eastern Railway Company to construct Branch Railways and other Works in the County of Durham; to acquire additional Lands; and for other Purposes.
Rathmines, Rathgar and St. Catherine's Improvement Act 1866	29 & 30 Vict. c. xii	18 May 1866
An Act for extending the Rathmines and Rathgar Township so as to include therein the Townlands of Cherry Orchard in the Parish of Saint Nicholas, of Argos, Harolds Cross, Mount Jerome, Rathland East, and Rathland West, in the Parish of Saint Catherine, all in the Barony of Upper Cross and County of Dublin.
Bodmin Waterworks Act 1866	29 & 30 Vict. c. xiii	18 May 1866
An Act for better supplying with Water the Borough and Parish of Bodmin in the County of Cornwall.
Holyhead Waterworks Act 1866	29 & 30 Vict. c. xiv	18 May 1866
An Act for better supplying with Water the Parish of Holyhead in the County of Anglesey.
Neath and Brecon Railway Act 1866	29 & 30 Vict. c. xv	18 May 1866
An Act to authorize the Neath and Brecon Railway Company to raise additional Capital; and for other Purposes.
Croydon Gas Act 1866	29 & 30 Vict. c. xvi	18 May 1866
An Act for granting further Powers to "The Croydon Commercial Gas and Coke Company."
Devon and Somerset Railway (Capital) Act 1866	29 & 30 Vict. c. xvii	18 May 1866
An Act to authorize Arrangements of the Capital of the Devon and Somerset Railway Company.
Paisley Waterworks Act 1866	29 & 30 Vict. c. xviii	18 May 1866
An Act to authorize the Paisley Water Commissioners to make and maintain additional Reservoirs and other Works, and to give an increased Supply of Water; and for other Purposes.
Bromsgrove and Droitwich Waterworks Act 1866 (repealed)	29 & 30 Vict. c. xix	18 May 1866
An Act for better supplying with Water the Towns of Bromsgrove and Droitwich, and certain Parishes and Places adjacent thereto in the County of Worcester. (Repealed by Statute Law (Repeals) Act 1998 (c. 43))
Thames Tunnel Act 1866	29 & 30 Vict. c. xx	18 May 1866
An Act for the winding-up of the Affairs and the Dissolution of the Thames Tunnel Company.
Dryclough, Shaw and Rochdale Roads Act 1866 (repealed)	29 & 30 Vict. c. xxi	18 May 1866
An Act to repeal an Act passed in the Seventh Year of the Reign of His Majesty King William the Fourth, intituled "An Act for improving and maintaining the Road from Dryclough through Shaw, New Hey, and Munrow to Rochdale, and other Roads in the County of Lancaster," (Note: Road from Dryclough to Rochdale Act 1837 (7 Will. 4 & 1 Vict. c. xxxiv)) and to grant more effectual Powers in lieu thereof; and for other Purposes. (Repealed by Annual Turnpike Acts Continuance Act 1884 (47 & 48 Vict. c. 52))
Butterton Moor End Turnpike Roads Act 1866 (repealed)	29 & 30 Vict. c. xxii	18 May 1866
An Act to extend the Term and amend the Provisions of the "Act for more effectually repairing and improving the Road from Butterton Moor End to the Turnpike Road leading from Buxton to Ashbourne, and other Roads therein mentioned, in the Counties of Stafford and Derby, and for making several Diversions or new Lines of Road to communicate therewith." (Note: Butterton Moor End and Buxton and Ashbourne Turnpike Road Act 1833 (3 & 4 Will. 4. c. xcvii)) (Repealed by Annual Turnpike Acts Continuance Act 1877 (40 & 41 Vict. c. 64))
Dublin Corporation Waterworks Acts Amendment Act 1866	29 & 30 Vict. c. xxiii	18 May 1866
An Act to enable the Lord Mayor, Aldermen, and Burgesses of Dublin to enlarge Portions of the Dublin Corporation Waterworks, to erect Telegraphic Poles and Wires, to borrow Money; and for other Purposes.
Dublin Port Acts Amendment Act 1866 (repealed)	29 & 30 Vict. c. xxiv	18 May 1866
An Act for enabling the Corporation for preserving and improving the Port of Dublin to borrow further Sums of Money; for amending the Provisions of former Acts relating to the Supply of Ballast by the said Corporation; and for other Purposes. (Repealed by Dublin Port and Docks Act 1869 (32 & 33 Vict. c. c))
Dublin Port (Docks) Act 1866 (repealed)	29 & 30 Vict. c. xxv	18 May 1866
An Act for enabling the Corporation for preserving and improving the Port of Dublin to purchase the Custom House Docks and Premises, the Grand Canal Docks and Warehouses, at Dublin; and for other Purposes. (Repealed by Dublin Port and Docks Act 1869 (32 & 33 Vict. c. c))
Leicester Cattle Market, Town Hall and Improvement Act 1866 (repealed)	29 & 30 Vict. c. xxvi	18 May 1866
An Act for empowering the Corporation of the Borough of Leicester to remove the Cattle Market of the Borough to another Site, and to erect a Town Hall and other Public Buildings, and for conferring other Powers on the said Corporation; and for other Purposes. (Repealed by Leicestershire Act 1985 (c. xvii))
Leicester Waterworks Act 1866	29 & 30 Vict. c. xxvii	18 May 1866
An Act for extending the Limits within which the Leicester Waterworks Company may supply Water, and for empowering the Company to construct further Works and to raise additional Capital, and for authorizing a further Arrangement between the Company and the Local Board of Health for the Borough of Leicester, and the raising of Money by the Local Board to effectuate that Arrangement; and for other Purposes.
Ross and Cromarty Roads Act 1866	29 & 30 Vict. c. xxviii	18 May 1866
An Act for more effectually maintaining and keeping in repair the Roads, Highways, and Bridges in the Counties of Ross and Cromarty; for making new Roads and Bridges in the said Counties, and for other Purposes.
Manchester Town Hall and Improvement Act 1866	29 & 30 Vict. c. xxix	18 May 1866
An Act for enabling the Mayor, Aldermen, and Citizens of the City of Manchester to eftect a Town Hall, Police Court, and other Buildings; to acquire additional Lands; and for other Purposes.
Morayshire Railway Act 1866	29 & 30 Vict. c. xxx	18 May 1866
An Act to enable the Morayshire Railway Company to raise Capital by creating new Shares or Stock; and for other Purposes.
Newark Gas Act 1866	29 & 30 Vict. c. xxxi	18 May 1866
An Act to confer further Powers upon the Newarh Gas Company, to authorize them to purchase additional Lands, to raise further Monies; and for other Purposes.
Stourbridge Gas (Amendment) Act 1866	29 & 30 Vict. c. xxxii	18 May 1866
An Act to enable the Stourbridge Gas Company to raise additional Capital.
Hornsey Gas Act 1866	29 & 30 Vict. c. xxxiii	18 May 1866
An Act for incorporating and granting other Powers to the Hornsey Gas Company, Limited.
Midland Great Western Railway of Ireland Act 1866 (repealed)	29 & 30 Vict. c. xxxiv	18 May 1866
An Act to enable the Midland Great Western Railway of Ireland Company to acquire additional Lands; and for other Purposes. (Repealed by Statute Law (Repeals) Act 2013 (c. 2))
Talacre Pier and Harbour Act 1866	29 & 30 Vict. c. xxxv	18 May 1866
An Act for forming a Pier, Harbour, and Railway in or adjoining the Parish of Llanasa in the County of Flint on and adjoining the Talacre Estate; and for other Purposes.
Drayton Junction Railway (Capital) Act 1866	29 & 30 Vict. c. xxxvi	18 May 1866
An Act to enable the Drayton Junction Railway Company to raise additional Capital, and to divide their Shares; and for other Purposes.
Frome Gas Act 1866 (repealed)	29 & 30 Vict. c. xxxvii	18 May 1866
All Act to incorporate the Frome Selwood Gras and Coke Company, and to make further Provision for lighting with Gas the Town of Frome Selwood and certain Parishes and Places in the Neighbourhood thereof; and for other Purposes. (Repealed by Bath Gas (No. 2) Special Order 1936 (SR&O 1936/1336))
Wrexham, Mold and Connah's Quay Railway (Additional Capital) Act 1866	29 & 30 Vict. c. xxxviii	18 May 1866
An Act to enable the Wrexham, Mold, and Connah's Quay Railway Company to raise additional Capital; and for other Purposes.
Tain Waterworks Act 1866	29 & 30 Vict. c. xxxix	18 May 1866
An Act for supplying with Water the Burgh of Tain and Places adjacent.
Briton Ferry Gas Act 1866	29 & 30 Vict. c. xl	18 May 1866
An Act for more effectually lighting Briton Ferry with Gas.
Buckley Railway (Additional Powers) Act 1866	29 & 30 Vict. c. xli	18 May 1866
An Act to enable the Buckley Railway Company to carry Passengers upon their Railway, and to raise further Monies; and for other Purposes.
Bury Gas Act 1866 (repealed)	29 & 30 Vict. c. xlii	18 May 1866
An Act for authorizing the Bury Improvement Commissioners to raise a further Sum of Money for their Gasworks; and for other Purposes. (Repealed by Bury Corporation Act 1909 (9 Edw. 7. c. clix))
Lancashire and Yorkshire Railway (Extension of Time, &c.) Act 1866	29 & 30 Vict. c. xliii	18 May 1866
An Act to extend the Time for the Construction of certain Railways authorised by "The Lancashire and Yorkshire Railway (Dewsbury, &c. Branches) Act, 1861," (Note: Lancashire and Yorkshire Railway (Dewsbury, &c. Branches) Act 1861 (24 & 25 Vict. c. l)) and "The Lancashire and Yorkshire Railway (Additional Powers) Act, 1862;" (Note: Lancashire and Yorkshire Railway (Additional Powers) Act 1862 (25 & 26 Vict. c. xcvii)) to empower the Lancashire and Yorkshire Railway Company to acquire additional Lands and to raise additional Capital; and for other Purposes.
Lancashire and Yorkshire Railway (Blackburn and Padiham) Act 1866	29 & 30 Vict. c. xliv	18 May 1866
An Act to authorize the Lancashire and Yorkshire Railway Company to construct a Railway between Blackburn and Padiham,
Afon Valley Railway Act 1866 (repealed)	29 & 30 Vict. c. xlv	18 May 1866
An Act to confer further Powers on the Afon Valley Railway Company. (Repealed by Statute Law (Repeals) Act 2013 (c. 2))
Dagenham (Thames) Dock Act 1866	29 & 30 Vict. c. xlvi	18 May 1866
An Act to enable the Dagenham (Thames) Dock Company to acquire additional Lands, and to enlarge their Undertaking, and to provide Abattoirs and other Conveniences; to amend the Dagenham (Thames) Dock Acts, 1859 (Note: Dagenham (Thames) Dock Act 1855 (18 & 19 Vict. c. clxii)) and 1862; (Note: Dagenham (Thames) Dock Act 1862 (25 & 26 Vict. c. ccxiii)) and for other Purposes.
Ventnor Gas and Water Act 1866 (repealed)	29 & 30 Vict. c. xlvii	18 May 1866
An Act for the Supply of the Town of Ventnor and its Vicinity in the Isle of Wight with Gas and Water. (Repealed by Isle of Wight Water Board Order 1950 (SI 1950/2009))
Dublin and Kingstown Railway (Lease) Act 1866	29 & 30 Vict. c. xlviii	18 May 1866
An Act for amending the Lease of the Dublin and Kingstown Railway to the Dublin, Wicklow, and Wexford Railway Company.
Newcastle and Gateshead Waterworks Act 1866 (repealed)	29 & 30 Vict. c. xlix	18 May 1866
An Act to authorize the Newcastle and Gateshead Water Company to construct additional Works; to extend the Time limited for completing and purchasing the Lands for certain Works; to amend the Act (Note: Newcastle and Gateshead Waterworks Act 1863 (26 & 27 Vict. c. xxxiv)) relating to the Company; and for other Purposes. (Repealed by Newcastle and Gateshead Water (Consolidation etc.) Order 1982 (SI 1982/1718))
Stafford District Turnpike Roads Act 1866	29 & 30 Vict. c. l	18 May 1866
An Act to amalgamate the Trusts of the Stafford, Sandon, and Eccleshall Roads, the Stone, Stafford, and Penkridge Roads, and the Stafford, Churchbridge, Uttoxeter, and Newport Roads; to authorize the Construction of a new Road; and for other Purposes.
Tynemouth Improvement Act 1866 (repealed)	29 & 30 Vict. c. li	11 June 1866
An Act for empowering the Corporation of Tynemouth to make new Streets; for amending the Rating Powers of the Corporation as the Local Board for the Borough; and for other Purposes. (Repealed by Tyne and Wear Act 1980 (c. xliii))
Congleton Gas and Improvement Act 1866	29 & 30 Vict. c. lii	11 June 1866
An Act for empowering the Corporation of the Borough of Congleton to purchase the Gasworks of the Congleton Gaslight Company, and to supply Gas within the Borough and its Neighbourhood in the County of Chester, and to pave and improve Streets and Highways in the Borough, and to improve and regulate Markets and Fairs in the Borough; and for other Purposes.
Barry Harbour Act 1866	29 & 30 Vict. c. liii	11 June 1866
An Act for converting the Estuary of Barry Island in the County of Glamorgan into a Tidal Harbour, and for constructing Works in connexion herewith; and for other Purposes.
Ryde Gas Act 1866	29 & 30 Vict. c. liv	11 June 1866
An Act to make further Provision for lighting with Om the Town of Ryde and the Neighbourhood thereof in the Isle of Wight; to incorporate the Ryde Gas and Coke Company; and for other Purposes.
London Gaslight Act 1866 (repealed)	29 & 30 Vict. c. lv	11 June 1866
An Act to authorize the London Gaslight Company to raise further Sums of Money; and for other Purposes. (Repealed by Statute Law (Repeals) Act 2013 (c. 2))
Congleton and Buxton Turnpike Road Act 1866	29 & 30 Vict. c. lvi	11 June 1866
An Act to extend the Term and amend the Provisions of An Act (Note: Road from Congleton to Thatchmarsh Bottom (Cheshire, Derbyshire) Act 1830 (11 Geo. 4 & 1 Will. 4. c. xxxii)) for repairing, amending, and maintaining the Road from Congleton in the County of Chester to a Branch of the Leek Turnpike Road at Thatchmarsh Bottom in the Parish of Hartington in the County of Derby, and from the Lowe to the Havannah Mills in the said County of Chester.
Parsonstown and Portumna Bridge Railway Act 1866	29 & 30 Vict. c. lvii	11 June 1866
An Act to authorize the Parsonstown and Portumna Bridge Railway Company to extend the Time for Completion of their Works; to issue Preference Shares; to sell or lease their Undertaking to the Great Southern and Western Railway Company; to enable the Great Southern and Western Railway Company to purchase, lease, and subscribe to the Company's Undertaking; and for other Purposes.
Wesleyan and General Assurance Society's Act 1866 (repealed)	29 & 30 Vict. c. lviii	11 June 1866
An Act for bringing the "Wesleyan and General Assurance Society" under the Operation of "The Friendly Societies Discharge Act, 1854;" (Note: Friendly Societies Discharge Act 1854 (17 & 18 Vict. c. 56)) and for removing Doubts with respect to the Validity of some of the Policies of the Society; and for other Purposes. (Repealed by Wesleyan and General Assurance Society Act 1914 (4 & 5 Geo. 5. c. clxvii))
South Staffordshire Waterworks Act 1866	29 & 30 Vict. c. lix	11 June 1866
An Act to confer further Powers on the South Staffordshire Waterworks Company with reference to their Undertaking, and to enable them to extend their Works and District of Supply; and for other Purposes.
Letterkenny and Londonderry and Lough Swilly Railway Companies Act 1866	29 & 30 Vict. c. lx	11 June 1866
An Act to authorize certain Arrangements between the Letterkenny Railway Company and the Londonderry and Lough Swilly Railway Company, and the Lease of the Undertaking of the Letterkenny Railway Company; to extend the Time limited for the Completion of the authorized Railway of the Letterkenny Railway Company; and for other Purposes.
Titanic Steel and Iron Company Act 1866	29 & 30 Vict. c. lxi	11 June 1866
An Act to remove Doubts as to the Validity of certain Resolutions of Meetings of the Titanic Steel and Iron Company (Limited); and for other Purposes.
Belfast Gas Act 1866	29 & 30 Vict. c. lxii	11 June 1866
An Act to amend the Acts relating to the Belfast Gaslight Company, and to enable that Company to acquire additional Lands.
Redheugh Bridge Act 1866 (repealed)	29 & 30 Vict. c. lxiii	11 June 1866
An Act for making and maintaining a Bridge across the River Tyne to connect the Boroughs of Newcastle-upon-Tyne and Gateshead, with Approaches thereto; and for other Purposes. (Repealed by Tyne and Wear Act 1976 (c. xxxvi))
Harwich Harbour (Reclamation of Land) Act 1866 (repealed)	29 & 30 Vict. c. lxiv	11 June 1866
An Act for the Reclamation from the Sea of certain Lands near Harwich, and the Construction of a Pier and other Works in connexion with such Reclamation. (Repealed by Harwich Parkeston Quay Act 1988 (c. xxviii))
Slough Gas Act 1866	29 & 30 Vict. c. lxv	11 June 1866
An Act for more effectually lighting Slough and its Neighbourhood with Gas.
Glasgow Juvenile Delinquency Repression Act 1866 (repealed)	29 & 30 Vict. c. lxvi	11 June 1866
An Act to amend an Act (Note: Glasgow Juvenile Delinquency Act 1841 (4 & 5 Vict. c. xxxvi)) for repressing Juvenile Delinquency in the City of Glasgow. (Repealed by Glasgow Juvenile Delinquency Prevention and Repression Act 1878 (41 & 42 Vict. c.cxxi))
Banffshire Roads Act 1866	29 & 30 Vict. c. lxvii	11 June 1866
An Act for more effectually maintaining and keeping in repair the Roads, Highways, and Bridges in the County of Banff; for making new Roads in the said County; and for other Purposes.
Grange and Cartmel District Gas and Waterworks Act 1866	29 & 30 Vict. c. lxviii	11 June 1866
An Act for supplying Grange, Cartmel, and other Places in Lancashire, and Arnside in Westmoreland, with Gas and Water.
South Essex Estuary and Reclamation Act 1866	29 & 30 Vict. c. lxix	11 June 1866
An Act for extending the Time for the Purchase of Lands, and the Completion of the Works authorized by the South Essex Estuary and Reclamation Act, 1852. (Note: South Essex Estuary and Reclamation Act 1852 (15 & 16 Vict. c. lxvi))
New Milford Docks Act 1866	29 & 30 Vict. c. lxx	11 June 1866
An Act for extending the Powers of "the New Milford Docks Company."
Lancashire and Yorkshire Railway (West Riding Branches, &c.) Act 1866	29 & 30 Vict. c. lxxi	11 June 1866
An Act for conferring Powers on the Lancashire and Yorkshire Railway Company for the Construction of Branch Bail ways and Works and the Acquisition of Lands in the West Riding of the County of York; and for other Purposes.
East Barnet Gas and Water Act 1866	29 & 30 Vict. c. lxxii	11 June 1866
An Act to incorporate the Proprietors of the East Barnet Gas and Water Company, Limited, and to confer on them further Powers for the Supply of Gas and Water; and for other Purposes.
Ebbw Vale, Beaufort, Sirhowy and Victoria District Waterworks Act 1866	29 & 30 Vict. c. lxxiii	11 June 1866
An Act for better supplying with Water Ebbw Vale, Beaufort, Sirhowy, Victoria, and the adjoining Districts, within the Parishes of Bedwellty, Aberystruth, Llangattock, and Llangunnider, in the Counties of Monmouth and Brecon; and for other Purposes.
Macclesfield and Chapel-en-le-Frith Turnpike Road Act 1866	29 & 30 Vict. c. lxxiv	11 June 1866
An Act to repeal an Act passed in the Third and Fourth Years of the Reign of His Majesty King William the Fourth, "for more effectually repairing the Road from the Canal Bridge in Hurdsfield in the County of Chester to the Turnpike Road at Randle Carr Lane Head in Fernilee in the County of Derby, leading to Chapel-in-the-Frith in the same County," (Note: Hurdsfield and Chapel-en-le-Frith Road (Derbyshire) Act 1833 (3 & 4 Will. 4. c. lix)) and another Act (Note: Hurdsfield and Chapel-en-le-Frith Road (No. 2) Act 1833 (3 & 4 Will. 4. c. cxx)) passed in the same Year, "to rectify a Mistake in the above-mentioned Act, and to make more effectual Provisions in lieu thereof."
Merrybent and Darlington Railway Act 1866	29 & 30 Vict. c. lxxv	11 June 1866
An Act to incorporate a Company for making a Railway to he called "the Merrybent and Darlington Railway," and a Branch therefrom; to authorize Working and Traffic Arrangements with the Northeastern Railway Company; and for other Purposes.
Nelson Water and Gas Act 1866	29 & 30 Vict. c. lxxvi	11 June 1866
An Act to enable the Local Board for the District of Nelson in the County of Lancaster to provide a Supply of Water and Gas for the District and its Neighbourhood, and to purchase the Undertaking of the Nelson Gas Company, Limited; and for other Purposes.
Hull Docks Act 1866	29 & 30 Vict. c. lxxvii	11 June 1866
An Act to authorize the Dock Company at Kingston-upon-Hull to enlarge the Western Dock, and to raise further Sums of Money; to extend the Time for the Completion of the Works; and for other Purposes.
Hexham and Allendale Railway Act 1866	29 & 30 Vict. c. lxxviii	11 June 1866
An Act to enable the Greenwich Hospital Estate and the North-eastern Railway Company to aid in the Completion of the Hexham and Allendale Railway; and for other Purposes.
Rochdale and Edenfield Road Act 1866	29 & 30 Vict. c. lxxix	11 June 1866
An Act for repairing and maintaining the Road from Rochdale to Edenfield in the County Palatine of Lancaster; and for other Purposes.
Parish of St. George Act 1866	29 & 30 Vict. c. lxxx	11 June 1866
An Act for altering the Vestry of the Parish of Saint George in the County of Gloucester, and for making further Provision as to the Election and Appointment of Overseers of the Poor and Churchwardens of the said Parish; and for other Purposes.
Cambridge University and Town Waterworks Act 1866	29 & 30 Vict. c. lxxxi	11 June 1866
An Act for extending the Limits of the District within which the Cambridge University and Town Waterworks Company may supply Water, and for empowering the Company to raise additional Capital; and for other Purposes.
Colney Hatch Gas Company's Act 1866	29 & 30 Vict. c. lxxxii	11 June 1866
An Act to dissolve and re-incorporate the Southgate and Colney Hatch Gaslight and Coke Company (Limited), for the Increase and Regulation of their Capital, and for conferring upon the new Company additional Powers with reference to the Manufacture and Supply of Gas within prescribed Limits in the Counties of Middlesex and Herts.
Birmingham Waterworks Act 1866 (repealed)	29 & 30 Vict. c. lxxxiii	11 June 1866
An Act to authorize the Company of Proprietors of the Birmingham Waterworks to extend their Limits of Supply, to construct further Works, and to raise additional Capital; and for other Purposes. (Repealed by Birmingham Corporation (Consolidation) Act 1883 (46 & 47 Vict. c. lxx))
Mersey Docks (Outer Works Alteration) Act 1866	29 & 30 Vict. c. lxxxiv	11 June 1866
An Act to enable the Mersey Docks and Harbour Board to improve their Docks at Birkenhead by converting the existing Low-water Basin and the Morpeth Basin into Wet Docks, and altering other Works connected therewith.
Glasgow Improvements Act 1866 or the Glasgow Improvement Act 1866	29 & 30 Vict. c. lxxxv	11 June 1866
An Act for the Improvement of the City of Glasgow, and the Construction of new, and widening, altering, and diverting of existing Streets in the said City; and for other Purposes.
South Yorkshire Railway Act 1866	29 & 30 Vict. c. lxxxvi	11 June 1866
An Act to authorize the South Yorkshire Railway and River Dun Company to widen and improve a Portion of their Railway, and to abandon other Portions thereof; and for other Purposes relating to the same Railway.
Wrexham and Minera Railway Act 1866	29 & 30 Vict. c. lxxxvii	11 June 1866
An Act to vest in the Great Western Railway Company and the London and North-western Railway Company jointly a Portion of the Wrexham and Minera Railway; and for other Purposes.
Bristol and Portishead Pier and Railway Act 1866	29 & 30 Vict. c. lxxxviii	11 June 1866
An Act to authorize the Bristol and Portishead Pier and Railway Company to alter the Pier at Portishead and to construct other Works, to extend the Time for the Purchase of Lands and Completion of Works, to amend the Act relating to the Company; and for other Purposes.
Colchester Gas Company's Act 1866	29 & 30 Vict. c. lxxxix	11 June 1866
An Act for incorporating the Colchester Gas Company, and defining the Limits for the Supply of Gas by them, and regulating their Capital; and for other Purposes.
Midland Railway (Additional Powers) Act 1866	29 & 30 Vict. c. xc	11 June 1866
An Act for conferring additional Powers on the Midland Railway Company for the Acquisition of Lands and the Increase and Regulation of their Capital, for giving Effect to Arrangements with the Great Western Railway Company in reference to Lines and Stations at Malvern; and for other Purposes.
Tyne Improvement Act 1866	29 & 30 Vict. c. xci	11 June 1866
An Act to enable the Tyne Improvement Commissioners to borrow further Sums of Money for the Purposes of the Piers at the Mouth of the River Tyne, to alter the Pier Rates, to amend the Acts relating to those Commissioners; and for other Purposes.
Barry Railway (Alteration) Act 1866 (repealed)	29 & 30 Vict. c. xcii	11 June 1866
An Act for authorizing an Alteration in the Line and Levels of the Barry Railway; and for other Purposes. (Repealed by Statute Law (Repeals) Act 2013 (c. 2))
River Weaver Navigation Act 1866	29 & 30 Vict. c. xciii	11 June 1866
An Act to authorize the Trustees of the River Weaver Navigation to raise a Sum of Money for the Improvement of their Navigation, and for other Purposes relating to the said Navigation.
British and Canadian Telegraph (North Atlantic Route) Act 1866	29 & 30 Vict. c. xciv	28 June 1866
An Act to confer further Powers on the British and Canadian Telegraph Company.
Downs Dock (Kent) Act 1866	29 & 30 Vict. c. xcv	28 June 1866
An Act for granting further Powers to "The Downs Docks Company."
Bridgwater and Taunton Canal Act 1866	29 & 30 Vict. c. xcvi	28 June 1866
An Act to authorize the Transfer to the Bristol and Exeter Railway Company of the Undertaking of the Bridgewater and Taunton Canal and Stolford Railway and Harbour Company; and for other Purposes.
Cleethorpes Gas Act 1866	29 & 30 Vict. c. xcvii	28 June 1866
An Act for incorporating and granting certain Powers to the Cleethorpes Gas Company.
Barnsley Local Board Amendment Act 1866 or the Barnsley Local Board Act 1866 (repealed)	29 & 30 Vict. c. xcviii	28 June 1866
An Act to extend the Time limited by "The Barnsley Local Board Act, 1862," (Note: Barnsley Local Board Act 1862 (25 & 26 Vict. c. xxxii)) for the Completion of the Waterworks thereby authorized, and to enable the Local Board of Health for the District of the Township of Barnsley in the West Riding of the County of York to raise further Monies for the Purposes of that Act, to amend the Acts relating to the said District; and for other Purposes. (Repealed by Statute Law (Repeals) Act 1989 (c. 43))
Canterbury Gas and Water Act 1866	29 & 30 Vict. c. xcix	28 June 1866
An Act to enable the Canterbury Gaslight, and Coke Company to raise further Sums of Money for their Gas and Water Undertakings; to construct and maintain a new System of Waterworks to supply the City of Canterbury and Suburbs and other Places, and to abandon their existing Waterworks; to change the Name of the Company, and to repeal, consolidate, and amend the Acts relating thereto; and for other Purposes.
Huntley Roads Act 1866 (repealed)	29 & 30 Vict. c. c	28 June 1866
An Act to continue the Huntley, Mitcheldean, and Elton Turnpike Roads Trust in the Counties of Gloucester and Hereford; and for other Purposes. (Repealed by Statute Law (Repeals) Act 2013 (c. 2))
Harborne Railway Act 1866	29 & 30 Vict. c. ci	28 June 1866
An Act to incorporate the Harborne Railway Company, and to authorize the making and maintaining of a Railway, to be called "The Harborne Railway;" and for other Purposes.
Montrose Harbour Act 1866	29 & 30 Vict. c. cii	28 June 1866
An Act for the Construction of a Wet Dock at the Harbour of Montrose; and for other Purposes.
Mersey Docks (Shore Road Purchase) Act 1866 (repealed)	29 & 30 Vict. c. ciii	28 June 1866
An Act to confirm an Agreement entered into by "The Mersey Docks and Harbour Board" for the Purchase of certain Lands at Birkenhead; and for other Purposes incidental thereto. (Repealed by Mersey Docks and Harbour Board Act 1971 (c. x))
Aberdeen County and Municipal Buildings Act 1866	29 & 30 Vict. c. civ	28 June 1866
An Act for erecting and maintaining a new Court House, Town House, County and Town Hall, Police, and other County and Municipal Buildings and Offices for the County and City of Aberdeen; and for other Purposes.
Hull South Bridge Amendment Act 1866	29 & 30 Vict. c. cv	28 June 1866
An Act to grant further Powers to the Hull South Bridge Company, and to facilitate the Completion of the Approaches and Tramway connected with the Bridge.
Stockton Gas Act 1866	29 & 30 Vict. c. cvi	28 June 1866
An Act to amend "The Stockton Gas Act, 1857," (Note: Stockton Gas Act 1857 (20 & 21 Vict. c. lii)) and to authorize the Stockton Municipal Corporation to raise more Money for the Purposes of their Gas Supply.
Metropolitan and St. John's Wood Railway (Capital) Act 1866	29 & 30 Vict. c. cvii	28 June 1866
An Act to authorize the Metropolitan and Saint John's Wood Railway Company to raise further Capital.
Crofthead and Kilmarnock Extension Railway (Deviations) Act 1866	29 & 30 Vict. c. cviii	28 June 1866
An Act for sanctioning the Construction of certain Deviations of the authorized Lines of the Crofthead and Kilmarnock Extension Railway, and of the Glasgow and Southwestern (Kilmarnock Direct) Railway; and for other Purposes.
Saltash Road Act 1866 (repealed)	29 & 30 Vict. c. cix	28 June 1866
An Act to repeal an Act passed in the Third Tear of the Reign of His Majesty King William the Fourth, intituled "An Act for more effectually repairing and improving several Bonds in the Counties of Cornwall and Devon leading to the Borough of Saltash in the County of Cornwall, and for making a new Branch and Deviations of Roads to communicate therewith," (Note: Saltash Roads Act 1833 (3 & 4 Will. 4. c. v)) and for granting more effectual Powers in lieu thereof. (Repealed by Annual Turnpike Acts Continuance Act 1881 (44 & 45 Vict. c. 31))
Tonbridge and Ightham Road Act 1866	29 & 30 Vict. c. cx	28 June 1866
An Act to repeal an Act passed in the Eleventh Year of the Reign of His Majesty King George the Fourth, intituled "An Act for amending and improving the Road from Tonbridge to Ightham and other Roads communicating therewith in the County of Kent;" (Note: Tonbridge and Ightham Road Act 1830 (11 Geo. 4 & 1 Will. 4. c. xcix)) and for granting more effectual Powers in lieu thereof.
Newchurch Parish Act 1866	29 & 30 Vict. c. cxi	28 June 1866
An Act for the Division of the Parish and Vicarage of Newchurch in the Isle of Wight into Three distinct Parishes and Vicarages.
Abercarn Turnpike Roads Act 1866 (repealed)	29 & 30 Vict. c. cxii	28 June 1866
An Act to extend the Term and amend the Provisions of the Act (Note: Lanfabon and Pontymoil Road Act 1832 (2 & 3 Will. 4. c. lxxvii)) relating to the Abercarn Turnpike Roads. (Repealed by Annual Turnpike Acts Continuance Act 1879 (42 & 43 Vict. c. 46))
Belfast Burial Ground Act 1866	29 & 30 Vict. c. cxiii	28 June 1866
An Act to facilitate the Establishment of a Burial Ground by the Town Council of the Borough of Belfast for the Use of the Inhabitants of the said Borough; and for other Purposes.
Bradford, Eccleshill and Idle Railway Act 1866	29 & 30 Vict. c. cxiv	28 June 1866
An Act for making a Railway in the West Riding of Yorkshire from Bradford through Eccleshill to Idle.
Bristol and Exeter Railway Act 1866	29 & 30 Vict. c. cxv	28 June 1866
An Act for enabling the Bristol and Exeter Railway Company to construct Railways and Works and purchase additional Lands in the Parish of Bridgwater in the County of Somerset, for transferring to the Company the Powers of constructing and working the Brean Down Railway; and for other Purposes.
Combemartin and Ilfracombe Turnpike Road Act 1866	29 & 30 Vict. c. cxvi	28 June 1866
An Act for making and maintaining a new Road between Combmartin and Ilfracombe, both in the County of Devon.
Llynvi Valley Railway Act 1866	29 & 30 Vict. c. cxvii	28 June 1866
An Act for authorizing the Llynvi Valley Railway Company to make Extension Railways, to acquire additional Lands for their Undertaking; to raise further Monies; and for other Purposes.
Swindon, Calne and Cricklade Turnpike Roads Act 1866	29 & 30 Vict. c. cxviii	28 June 1866
An Act to extend the Term and amend the Provisions of the Act relating to the Roads leading from Swindon to Christian Malford Bridge, from Calne to Lyneham Green, and from the Direction Post in Long Leaze Lane near Lydiard Marsh to Cricklade in the County of Wilts.
British Gaslight Company (Staffordshire Potteries) Act 1866	29 & 30 Vict. c. cxix	28 June 1866
An Act to alter and amend certain of the Provisions of "The British Gaslight Company, Limited, (Staffordshire Potteries) Act, 1858." (Note: Staffordshire Potteries Gas Act 1858 (21 & 22 Vict. c. xxxiii))
Llynvi and Ogmore Railways (Amalgamation) Act 1866	29 & 30 Vict. c. cxx	28 June 1866
An Act for the Amalgamation of the Llynvi Valley Railway Company and the Ogmore Valley Railways Company; and for other Purposes.
North Walsham and Dilham Canal Act 1866	29 & 30 Vict. c. cxxi	28 June 1866
An Act to amend certain of the Provisions of the North Walsham and Dilham Canal Act. (Note: North Walsham and Dilham Canal Navigation Act 1812 (52 Geo. 3. c. lxix))
Greenwich and Woolwich Turnpike Lower Road Act 1866 (repealed)	29 & 30 Vict. c. cxxii	28 June 1866
An Act for continuing the Term and Provisions oi the several Statutes relating to the Greenwich and Woolwich Turnpike Lower Road in the County of Kent. (Repealed by Annual Turnpike Acts Continuance Act 1870 (33 & 34 Vict. c. 73))
Harnham, Blandford and Dorchester Road Act 1866 (repealed)	29 & 30 Vict. c. cxxiii	28 June 1866
An Act for the Harnham, Blandford, and Dorchester Turnpike Road in the Counties of Wilts and Dorset. (Repealed by Annual Turnpike Acts Continuance Act 1879 (42 & 43 Vict. c. 46))
Cork and Youghal and Great Southern and Western Railways Act 1866	29 & 30 Vict. c. cxxiv	28 June 1866
An Act for the winding up of the Affairs and the Dissolution of the Cork and Youghal Railway Company; and for other Purposes.
Longton Gas Act 1866 (repealed)	29 & 30 Vict. c. cxxv	28 June 1866
An Act for hotter supplying with Gas the Inhabitants of Longton, and of certain Places in the Neighbourhood thereof, in the County of Stafford. (Repealed by Stoke-on-Trent (Gas Consolidation) Act 1922 (12 & 13 Geo. 5. c. xxii))
Liverpool Corporation Waterworks Act 1866	29 & 30 Vict. c. cxxvi	28 June 1866
An Act to empower the Mayor, Aldermen, and Burgesses of the Borough of Liverpool to construct a Reservoir, Roads, and other Works, to obtain Water from the River Roddiesworth; and for other Purposes.
Great Northern Railway (Additional Powers) Act 1866	29 & 30 Vict. c. cxxvii	28 June 1866
An Act to confer additional Powers on the Great Northern Railway Company with respect to their Undertaking.
Aldrington, Hove and Brighton Gas Act 1866	29 & 30 Vict. c. cxxviii	28 June 1866
An Act to incorporate a Company for the Establishment of Gasworks in the Parish of Aldrington in the County of Sussex, for more effectually lighting with Gas the Town of Brighton and various Parishes and Places in its Vicinity; and for other Purposes.
Bridgnorth, Wolverhampton and Staffordshire Railway Act 1866	29 & 30 Vict. c. cxxix	28 June 1866
An Act for making Railways from Bridgnorth in Shropshire to Wolverhampton and other Districts in Staffordshire; and for other Purposes.
Magdalen Hospital Amendment Act 1866 (repealed)	29 & 30 Vict. c. cxxx	28 June 1866
An Act for enabling the President, Vice-Presidents, Treasurer, and Governors of the Magdalen Hospital for the Reception of Penitent Prostitutes to sell and grant Leases of the present Site of the Hospital and other Lands belonging to them, to acquire a new Site for the Hospital, and to erect a Hospital thereon; and for other Purposes. (Repealed by Statute Law (Repeals) Act 2013 (c. 2))
Cork Harbour Amendment Act 1866	29 & 30 Vict. c. cxxxi	28 June 1866
An Act to amend the Powers of the Commissioners for improving and preserving the Port, Harbour, and River of Cork with respect to Rates and Dues; and for other Purposes.
Cleator and Furness Railway Act 1866	29 & 30 Vict. c. cxxxii	28 June 1866
An Act to empower the Whitehaven and Furness Junction Railway Company and the Whitehaven, Cleator, and Egtemont Railway Company to make a Railway from Egremont to Sellafield in the County of Cumberland; to raise further Capital; and for other Purposes.
Dundee Waterworks (Extension) Act 1866 (repealed)	29 & 30 Vict. c. cxxxiii	28 June 1866
An Act to enable the Dundee Water Company to execute additional Works, and to raise a further Sum of Money; and for other Purposes. (Repealed by Dundee Corporation (Water, Transport, Finance, &c.) Order Confirmation Act 1954 (2 & 3 Eliz. 2. c. ix))
South Staffordshire Railway Act 1866	29 & 30 Vict. c. cxxxiv	28 June 1866
An Act for conferring further Powers on the South Staffordshire Railway Company with respect to their Capital; and for other Purposes.
Amicable and Norwich Union Societies Act 1866	29 & 30 Vict. c. cxxxv	28 June 1866
An Act to give Effect to an Arrangement between the Amicable Society for a Perpetual Assurance Office and the Norwich Union Life Insurance Society; and for other Purposes.
Eastern Bengal Railway Act 1866 (repealed)	29 & 30 Vict. c. cxxxvi	28 June 1866
An Act for regulating the Powers of the Eastern Bengal Railway Company; and for other Purposes. (Repealed by Statute Law (Repeals) Act 2013 (c. 2))
Wigton Waterworks Act 1866	29 & 30 Vict. c. cxxxvii	28 June 1866
An Act for supplying the Town of Wigton and other Places in the County of Cumberland with Water; and for other Purposes.
Worcester, Bromyard and Leominster Railway Act 1866	29 & 30 Vict. c. cxxxviii	28 June 1866
An Act to extend the Time limited for the purchasing of Lands for and for completing the Worcester, Bromyard, and Leominster Railway; and for other Purposes.
Mersey Railway Act 1866	29 & 30 Vict. c. cxxxix	28 June 1866
An Act for the Construction of Railways whereby Liverpool will be connected with Birkenhead.
Bodmin Turnpike Roads Act 1866 (repealed)	29 & 30 Vict. c. cxl	28 June 1866
An Act to grant a further Term in certain Roads leading to and from Bodmin, and other Roads in the Neighbourhood thereof, all in the County of Cornwall; to alter and improve One of those Roads, and grant further Powers for the Management of the Trust; to alter the Rights of Creditors; to repeal the existing Act; (Note: Bodmin Roads Act 1835 (5 & 6 Will. 4. c. cv)) and for other Purposes. (Repealed by Annual Turnpike Acts Continuance Act 1874 (37 & 38 Vict. c. 95))
Uxbridge and Rickmansworth Railway Act 1866 (repealed)	29 & 30 Vict. c. cxli	28 June 1866
An Act for further extending the Time for the Purchase of Lands and the Completion of the Uxbridge and Rickmansworth Railway. (Repealed by Statute Law (Repeals) Act 2013 (c. 2))
East and West Junction Railway (Capital) Act 1866	29 & 30 Vict. c. cxlii	28 June 1866
An Act to enable the East and West Junction Railway Company to raise further Money, and to create Preference Shares; and for other Purposes.
Middlesbrough Extension and Improvement Act 1866 (repealed)	29 & 30 Vict. c. cxliii	28 June 1866
An Act to extend and alter the Boundaries of the Municipal Borough and District of Middlesbrough in the North Riding of the County of York; to extend the Time for the Completion of the Market Place; to construct additional Gasworks and light adjoining Townships; to authorize the compulsory Purchase of the Rights of the North-eastern Railway Company in the Port Clarence Landing Place, and the Construction of a Landing Place at Newport, and the Purchase of Lands for the same; to extend the Powers of the Burial Board, provide a public Park, an additional Burial Ground, and a Town Hall and Police Station; to improve certain Streets and Roads, and divert a public Footpath; to raise further Monies; to alter and amend the existing Acts relating to the Borough and District; and for other Purposes. (Repealed by Middlesbrough Corporation Act 1933 (23 & 24 Geo. 5. c. lxxxiii))
Great Southern and Western Railway Act 1866	29 & 30 Vict. c. cxliv	28 June 1866
An Act to enable the Great Southern and Western Railway Company to make a Railway at Cork to connect their Railway with the Cork and Youghal Railway, and to raise Money for the Purchase and for the Purposes of the Cork and Youghal Railway; and for other Purposes.
Roach River Oyster Fishery Act 1866	29 & 30 Vict. c. cxlv	28 June 1866
An Act for the Incorporation of the Roach River Oyster Fishery Company, and for authorizing them to establish and maintain an Oyster Fishery in the River Roach in the County of Essex; and for other Purposes.
Glasgow and South Western Railway (Ayrshire Lines) Act 1866	29 & 30 Vict. c. cxlvi	28 June 1866
An Act to enable the Glasgow and South-western Railway Company to make and maintain certain Railways in the County of Ayr; and for other Purposes.
Launceston and South Devon Railway Act 1866	29 & 30 Vict. c. cxlvii	28 June 1866
An Act for conferring further Powers on the Launceston and South Devon Railway Company in relation to their Capital; and for other Purposes.
Bristol Harbour Railway Act 1866	29 & 30 Vict. c. cxlviii	28 June 1866
An Act for making a Railway, Wharf and Depôt in the City and County of Bristol to connect the existing Railways with the Floating Harbour; and for granting certain Powers to the Great Western and Bristol and Exeter Railway Companies, and to the Mayor, Aldermen, and Burgesses of the City of Bristol, with reference thereto.
Cefn, Acrefair and Rhosymedre Water Act 1866	29 & 30 Vict. c. cxlix	28 June 1866
An Act for better supplying with Water Cefn and Places adjacent in the County of Denbigh.
Kensington Improvement Act 1866 (repealed)	29 & 30 Vict. c. cl	28 June 1866
An Act to enable the Metropolitan Board of Works to make Improvements in the Parish of Saint Mary Abbotts, Kensington, in the County of Middlesex, by widening High Street and King Street, and forming new Lines of Streets connected therewith; and for other Purposes. (Repealed by Local Law (Greater London Council and Inner London Boroughs) Order 1965 (SI 1965/540))
Leeds Improvement of Becks Act 1866 (repealed)	29 & 30 Vict. c. cli	28 June 1866
An Act for authorizing the Corporation of the Borough of Leeds to make certain Cuts and Drains for the Improvement of the Borough; and for other Purposes. (Repealed by West Yorkshire Act 1980 (c. xiv))
Rochdale Waterworks Act 1866	29 & 30 Vict. c. clii	28 June 1866
An Act for enabling the Rochdale Waterworks Company to furnish a better Supply of Water, and to execute further Works, and to raise further Monies; and for other Purposes.
South Devon Railway Act 1866	29 & 30 Vict. c. cliii	28 June 1866
An Act to confer further Powers on the South Devon Railway Company for the Acquisition of Land and Construction of Works, and otherwise, in relation to their own Undertaking and the Undertakings of other Companies; and for other Purposes.
Berks and Hants Extension Railway (Extension) Act 1866 (repealed)	29 & 30 Vict. c. cliv	28 June 1866
An Act to authorize the Berks and Hants Extension Railway Company to extend their Railway to the Wilts, Somerset, and Weymouth Railway at Westbury. (Repealed by Statute Law (Repeals) Act 2013 (c. 2))
Brynmawr Gas Act 1866	29 & 30 Vict. c. clv	28 June 1866
An Act for lighting with Gas the Parish of Llanelly, and certain Parts of the Parishes of Llangattoch and Llangynider in the County of Brecon, and the Parish of Aberystruth in the County of Monmouth.
Greenock Port and Harbour Act 1866	29 & 30 Vict. c. clvi	28 June 1866
An Act to consolidate and amend the Acts relating to the Port and Harbours of Greenock; to authorize the Construction of a new Harbour and Graving Dock and other Works; and for other Purposes.
Leeds Improvement Act 1866 (repealed)	29 & 30 Vict. c. clvii	28 June 1866
An Act for amending the Acts for the Improvement of the Borough of Leeds, and for conferring further Powers on the Corporation of Leeds for the Improvement of the Borough; and for other Purposes. (Repealed by Leeds Corporation (Consolidation) Act 1905 (5 Edw. 7. c. i))
Manchester, Sheffield and Lincolnshire Railway (Additional Powers) Act 1866	29 & 30 Vict. c. clviii	28 June 1866
An Act for conferring additional Powers on the Manchester, Sheffield, and Lincolnshire Railway Company with respect to the widening of Part of their Main Line of Railway; and for other Purposes.
Macclesfield, Knutsford and Warrington Railway Act 1866	29 & 30 Vict. c. clix	28 June 1866
An Act for making a Railway from Macclesfield to Knutsford and Warrington; and for other Purposes.
Metropolitan Railway (Additional Powers) Act 1866	29 & 30 Vict. c. clx	28 June 1866
An Act to confer additional Powers on the Metropolitan Railway Company; to enable such Company to alter and improve Portions of their authorized Works, and to acquire additional Lands; to authorize Agreements with other Parties; to extend the Time for completing certain Works; to amend the Acts relating to the Company; and for other Purposes.
Sunningdale and Cambridge Town Railway (Alterations) Act 1866 (repealed)	29 & 30 Vict. c. clxi	28 June 1866
An Act for altering in some Particulars the authorized Mode of Construction of the Sunningdale and Cambridge Town Railway and its Extensions; and for other Purposes. (Repealed by Statute Law (Repeals) Act 2013 (c. 2))
West Riding and Grimsby Railway (Transfer) Act 1866	29 & 30 Vict. c. clxii	28 June 1866
An Act to transfer the West Riding and Grimsby Railway to the Great Northern and Manchester, Sheffield, and Lincolnshire Railway Companies jointly; and for other Purposes with respect to the said Undertaking and Companies.
Hatfield Chase Warping and Improvement (Railway) Act 1866	29 & 30 Vict. c. clxiii	16 July 1866
An Act to authorize the Hatfield Chase Warping and Improvement Company to make Railways in connexion with their Works.
London, Worcester, and South Wales Railway (Deviation) Act 1866 (repealed)	29 & 30 Vict. c. clxiv	16 July 1866
An Act for enabling the London, Worcester, and South Wales Railway Company to make Deviations and Alterations in their authorized Railway. (Repealed by Statute Law (Repeals) Act 2013 (c. 2))
Severn Junction Railway Act 1866	29 & 30 Vict. c. clxv	16 July 1866
An Act to enable the Severn Junction Railway Company to construct Branch Railways to the South Wales Railway and the Forest of Dean Central Railway; and for other Purposes.
Great Northern Railway (Barnet Branch Abandonment) Act 1866 (repealed)	29 & 30 Vict. c. clxvi	16 July 1866
An Act to authorize the Great Northern Railway Company to abandon the Construction of a short Line of Railway and other Works at Barnet. (Repealed by Statute Law (Repeals) Act 2013 (c. 2))
Leven and East of Fife Railway Act 1866	29 & 30 Vict. c. clxvii	16 July 1866
An Act for authorizing the Leven and East of Fife Railway Company to make and maintain certain Branches in the Parishes of Markinch and Wemyss in the County of Fife; and for other Purposes.
London and North-western Railway (New Lines) Act 1866	29 & 30 Vict. c. clxviii	16 July 1866
An Act for enabling the London and North-western Railway Company to construct new Railways; and for other Purposes.
Stourbridge Improvement Act 1866	29 & 30 Vict. c. clxix	16 July 1866
An Act for the Improvement of Stourbridge in the County of Worcester, and for the Regulation of Markets there; and for other Purposes.
Kingsbridge and Dartmouth Roads Act 1866	29 & 30 Vict. c. clxx	16 July 1866
An Act to continue the Kingsbridge and Dartmouth Turnpike Roads Trust in the County of Devon; and for other Purposes.
North British Railway (St. Margaret's Diversion) Act 1866	29 & 30 Vict. c. clxxi	16 July 1866
An Act to authorize the North British Railway Company to make a Railway between the Two several Points in their Main line in the Parish of South Leith; and for other Purposes.
North British and Leadburn, Linton, and Dolphinton Railways Act 1866	29 & 30 Vict. c. clxxii	16 July 1866
An Act to amalgamate the Leadburn, Linton, and Dolphinton Railway Company with the North British Railway Company.
North British Railway (Stirling Branches) Act 1866	29 & 30 Vict. c. clxxiii	16 July 1866
An Act to authorise the North British Railway Company to make several Railways in the Counties of Lanark, Dumbarton, and Stirling in connexion with the late Edinburgh and Glasgow and Monklands Railways; and for other Purposes.
Longton, Adderley Green, and Bucknall Railway Act 1866	29 & 30 Vict. c. clxxiv	16 July 1866
An Act for making a Railway from Longton through Adderley Green to Bucknall, with Branches, all in the County of Stafford; and for other Purposes.
Tottenham and Hampstead Junction Railway Act 1866	29 & 30 Vict. c. clxxv	16 July 1866
An Act for authorizing the Tottenham and Hampstead Junction Railway Company to raise further Monies, and for making Provision with respect to a Lease, Sale, or Amalgamation of the Undertaking of the Company; and for other Purposes.
Furness Railway Act 1866	29 & 30 Vict. c. clxxvi	16 July 1866
An Act for conferring additional Powers on the Furness Railway Company for the Construction of Works and otherwise in relation to their Undertaking; and for other Purposes.
Thames Subway Act 1866	29 & 30 Vict. c. clxxvii	16 July 1866
An Act for making and maintaining a Subway from Deptford under the River Thames to the Isle of Dogs; and for other Purposes.
Metropolitan District Railway Act 1866	29 & 30 Vict. c. clxxviii	16 July 1866
An Act to enable the Metropolitan District Railway Company to acquire additional Lands and for other Purposes relating to the Undertaking of the same Company.
Dublin and Antrim Junction Railway Act 1866	29 & 30 Vict. c. clxxix	16 July 1866
An Act to extend the Period now limited for the Construction and Completion of the Dublin and Antrim Junction Railway, and to enable the Dublin and Antrim Junction Railway Company to create Preference Shares, and to enable the said Company to let their Undertaking to the Belfast and Northern Counties or the Ulster Railway Companies; and for other Purposes.
East London Railway (Additional Powers) Act 1866	29 & 30 Vict. c. clxxx	16 July 1866
An Act for conferring further Powers on the East London Railway Company for the Construction of Branch Railways and Works and the Acquisition of Lands; and for other Purposes.
Sutherland Railway Act 1866	29 & 30 Vict. c. clxxxi	16 July 1866
An Act for making a Diversion of Part of the Sutherland Railway; for relinquishing a Portion of the said Railway; and for other Purposes.
Midland Counties and Shannon Junction Railway Act 1866	29 & 30 Vict. c. clxxxii	16 July 1866
An Act to revive and extend the Time granted to the Midland Counties and Shannon Junction Railway Company for the Purchase of Lands and Execution of Works; and for other Purposes relating to the said Company.
Beddgelert Railway (Extension and Deviation) Act 1866	29 & 30 Vict. c. clxxxiii	16 July 1866
An Act to enable the Beddgelert Railway Company to extend their Railway to Llyn-Gwynant; to make a Deviation in their authorized Railway; and for other Purposes.
Brighton and Hove General Gas Company's Act 1866	29 & 30 Vict. c. clxxxiv	16 July 1866
An Act for extending the Limits of the District within which the Brighton and Have General Gras Company may supply Gas; and for empowering the Company to raise additional Capital; and for other Purposes.
Economic Telegraph Act 1866	29 & 30 Vict. c. clxxxv	16 July 1866
An Act for re-incorporating the Economic Telegraph Company (Limited), and for extending to them the Powers of "The Telegraph Act, 1863." (Note: Telegraph Act 1863 (26 & 27 Vict. c. 112))
Hoylake Railway (Extension) Act 1866	29 & 30 Vict. c. clxxxvi	16 July 1866
An Act for the Extension of the Hoylake Railway to Parkgate; and for other Purposes.
North-eastern, Hull, and Hornsea Railway Amalgamation Act 1866	29 & 30 Vict. c. clxxxvii	16 July 1866
An Act for amalgamating the Undertaking of the Hull and Hornsea Railway Company with that of the North-eastern Railway Company; and for other Purposes.
Kilmarnock Water Company's Act 1866	29 & 30 Vict. c. clxxxviii	16 July 1866
An Act for supplying with Water the Town of Kilmarnock, Suburbs thereof, and Places adjacent.
London and North-western Railway (Cockermouth and Workington Railway Transfer) Act 1866	29 & 30 Vict. c. clxxxix	16 July 1866
An Act for vesting the Undertaking of the Cockermouth and Workington Railway Company in the London and North-western Railway Company; and for other Purposes.
London and North-western Railway (Whitehaven Railway Transfer) Act 1866	29 & 30 Vict. c. cxc	16 July 1866
An Act for vesting the Undertaking of the Whitehaven Junction Railway Company in the London and North-western Railway Company; and for conferring upon the last-named Company Running Powers over a Portion of the Whitehaven and Furness Junction Railway; and for other Purposes.
Manchester, Sheffield, and Lincolnshire Railway (Liverpool Extension) Act 1866	29 & 30 Vict. c. cxci	16 July 1866
An Act for constituting the Great Northern and Midland Railway Companies joint Owners of the Railway authorized by the Manchester, Sheffield, and Lincolnshire Railway (Extension to Liverpool) Act, 1865; (Note: Manchester, Sheffield and Lincolnshire Railway (Extension to Liverpool) Act 1865 (28 & 29 Vict. c. ccclxxviii)) and for other Purposes.
Manchester, Sheffield, and Lincolnshire Railway (New Lines) Act 1866	29 & 30 Vict. c. cxcii	16 July 1866
An Act for empowering the Manchester, Sheffield, and Lincolnshire Railway Company, the Great Northern Railway Company, and the Midland Railway Company to make new Lines of Railway in connexion with the Railways authorized by the Manchester, Sheffield, and Lincolnshire Railway (Extension to Liverpool) Act, 1865, and to abandon and divert a Portion of the Line of Railway authorized by that Act, and to stop up and divert a Part of the Duke of Bridgewater's Canal.
Sheffield Gas Act 1866	29 & 30 Vict. c. cxciii	16 July 1866
An Act for extending the Limits of "The Sheffield Gas Act, 1855," (Note: Sheffield Gas Act 1855 (18 & 19 Vict. c. xiv)) and for authorizing "The Sheffield United Gaslight Company" to extend their Works and increase their Capital; and for other Purposes.
Thorpe and Great Clacton Railway Act 1866	29 & 30 Vict. c. cxciv	16 July 1866
An Act for making a Railway from the Tendring Hundred Railway at Thorpe-le-Soken to Great Clacton, and a Pier there, all in the County of Essex; and for other Purposes.
Whitby, Redcar, and Middlesborough Union Railway Act 1866 or the Whitby, Redcar and Middlesbrough Union Railway Act 1866	29 & 30 Vict. c. cxcv	16 July 1866
An Act for making a Railway in the North Riding of the County of York, to be called "The Whitby, Redcar, and Middlesborough Union Railway;" and for other Purposes.
Winchcomb and Midland Railway Act 1866	29 & 30 Vict. c. cxcvi	16 July 1866
An Act for making a Railway from near Beckford to Winchcomb; and for other Purposes.
Cannock Chase and Wolverhampton Railway Act 1866	29 & 30 Vict. c. cxcvii	16 July 1866
An Act to enable the Cannock Chase and Wolverhampton Railway Company to extend their Railway to Hednesford and to the South Staffordshire Railway in the County of Stafford; and for other Purposes.
Thetford and Watton Railway Act 1866	29 & 30 Vict. c. cxcviii	16 July 1866
An Act for making a Railway from the Great Eastern Railway to Walton in the County of Norfolk, to be called "The Thetford and Watton Railway."
United General Gaslight Company's Act 1866	29 & 30 Vict. c. cxcix	16 July 1866
An Act to determine the Powers of the United General Gaslight Company for the lighting Dublin and its Neighbourhood with Gas; and for other Purposes connected with the same Company.
North British Railway (Esk Valley Lease) Act 1866 (repealed)	29 & 30 Vict. c. cc	16 July 1866
An Act for leasing the Esk Valley Railway to the North British Railway Company; and for other Purposes. (Repealed by North British Railway Act 1871 (34 & 35 Vict. c. cvi))
Potteries, Shrewsbury and North Wales Act 1866 or the Potteries, Shrewsbury and North Wales Railway Act 1866	29 & 30 Vict. c. cci	16 July 1866
An Act to amalgamate the Shrewsbury and North Wales and Shrewsbury and Potteries Junction Railway Companies.
Glasgow and South-western Railway (Additional Powers) Act 1866	29 & 30 Vict. c. ccii	16 July 1866
An Act for conferring additional Powers on the Glasgow and South-western Railway Company for the Construction of Railways and Works, and otherwise in relation to their Undertaking; and for other Purposes.
Aldershot Gas and Water Act 1866	29 & 30 Vict. c. cciii	16 July 1866
An Act for re-constituting the Aldershot Gas and Water Company, and for enabling the Company the better to supply the Parish of Aldershot in the County of Southampton; and for other Purposes.
Salisbury and Yeovil Railway Act 1866	29 & 30 Vict. c. cciv	16 July 1866
An Act to enable the Salisbury and Yeovil Railway Company to make a Railway to connect the Somerset and Yeovil Railway with the Somerset and Dorset Railway, and to acquire additional Lands in the Parish of Templecombe; and for other Purposes.
Alliance and Dublin Gas Act 1866 or the Alliance and Dublin Consumers Gas Act 1866	29 & 30 Vict. c. ccv	16 July 1866
An Act for incorporating "The Alliance and Dublin Consumers Gas Company," formed by the Amalgamation of "The Alliance and Dublin Consumers Gas Company" and "The Commercial Gas Company of Ireland, Limited;" and for authorizing the Acquisition by the Company of Gasworks and Property of "The United General Gas Company;" and for defining the Limits within which the Company may supply Gas; and for other Purposes.
Edgware, Highgate, and London Railway (Extension to Barnet) Act 1866	29 & 30 Vict. c. ccvi	16 July 1866
An Act to authorize the Edgeware, Highgate, and London Railway Company to extend their Railway to the Town of Barnet in Hertfordshire.
Manchester and Stockport Railway Act 1866	29 & 30 Vict. c. ccvii	16 July 1866
An Act for making a Railway from Manchester to Stockport.
Ayr Harbour Amendment Act 1866	29 & 30 Vict. c. ccviii	16 July 1866
An Act for the Construction of a Wet Dock and Railways at the Harbour of Ayr; and for other Purposes.
Brynmawr and Blaenavon Railway Act 1866	29 & 30 Vict. c. ccix	16 July 1866
An Act for making a Railway from the Merthyr, Tredegar, and Abergavenny Railway near the Brynmawr Station thereof to Blaenavon; and for other Purposes.
Mid-Wales Railway Act 1866	29 & 30 Vict. c. ccx	16 July 1866
An Act to enable the Mid-Wales Railway Company to raise further Sums of Money; and for other Purposes.
Shrewsbury and Potteries Junction Railway (Deviations) Act 1866	29 & 30 Vict. c. ccxi	16 July 1866
Junction Railway Company to deviate from and alter Parts of their authorized Works, and to make new Branch and Junction Railways and Diversions of Roads in connexion with their authorised Works; and to amend "The Shrewsbury and Potteries Junction Railway Act, 1865;" (Note: Shrewsbury and Potteries Junction Railway Act 1865 (28 & 29 Vict. c. cccxli)) and to authorize the Admission of the said Company to participate in the Ownership of the Wellington and Drayton Railway; and for other Purposes.
Swansea Vale and Neath and Brecon Junction Railway (Lease) Act 1866 (repealed)	29 & 30 Vict. c. ccxii	16 July 1866
An Act authorising a Lease of the Swansea Vale and Neath and Brecon Junction Railway to the Neath and Brecon Railway Company. (Repealed by Neath and Brecon Railway (Amalgamation and Arrangement) Act 1869 (32 & 33 Vict. c. cxlv))
Wivenhoe and Brightlingsea Railway (Capital) Act 1866	29 & 30 Vict. c. ccxiii	16 July 1866
An Act to enable the Wivenhoe and Brightlingsea Railway Company to raise additional Capital; and for other Purposes.
East Gloucestershire Railway Act 1866	29 & 30 Vict. c. ccxiv	16 July 1866
An Act to authorize the East Gloucestershire Railway Company to make Works and Deviations; and for other Purposes relating to the same Railway.
Hemel Hempsted and London and North-western Railway Extension Act 1866 or the Hemel Hempstead and London and North Western Railway Extension Act 1866	29 & 30 Vict. c. ccxv	16 July 1866
An Act to confer further Powers upon the Hemel Hempsted and London and North-western Railway Company; and for other Purposes.
London and South-western Railway (Additional Powers) Act 1866	29 & 30 Vict. c. ccxvi	16 July 1866
An Act for authorizing the London and South-western Railway Company to make and maintain the Brentford Curve and the Kew Bridge Curve and other Works; and for authorizing Arrangements between them and other Companies; and for authorizing a Lease or Transfer to them of the Okehampton Railway; and for the Increase of their Capital; and for other Purposes.
South-western Railway (Poole and Bournemouth Junction) Act 1866	29 & 30 Vict. c. ccxvii	16 July 1866
An Act for authorizing the London and South-western Railway Company to construct Railways from their Southampton and Dorchester Railway to the Poole and Bournemouth Railway; and for other Purposes.
Neath New Gas Act 1866	29 & 30 Vict. c. ccxviii	16 July 1866
An Act for granting pertain Powers to the Neath New Gas Company.
North British Railway (Coatbridge Branches) Act 1866	29 & 30 Vict. c. ccxix	16 July 1866
An Act to authorize the North British Railway Company to make certain Railways in connexion with their System in the Counties of Lanark, Linlithgow, and Stirling, and a Deviation in the Forth and Clyde Canal; and for other Purposes.
Shrewsbury and North Wales Railway (Deviations, &c.) Act 1866	29 & 30 Vict. c. ccxx	16 July 1866
An Act to enable the Shrewsbury and North Wales Railway Company to make a certain Railway, and also certain Deviations and Alterations in their authorized Line of Railway; and for other Purposes.
Stourbridge Railway (Further Powers) Act 1866	29 & 30 Vict. c. ccxxi	16 July 1866
An Act to authorize the Stourbridge Railway Company to construct a new Railway at Stourbridge; to raise additional Capital; and for other Purposes.
Bradford Corporation Act 1866	29 & 30 Vict. c. ccxxii	16 July 1866
An Act for authorizing the Mayor, Aldermen, and Burgesses of the Borough of Bradford in the County of York to acquire and to regulate the Markets and Fairs in the Borough, and to provide Places for holding the Markets and Fairs, and to take Tolls for the same; and for extending the Periods for the Completion of their "Waterworks; and for authorizing them to acquire Lands and to raise further Monies; and for regulating their Borrowing Powers and Debt; and for other Purposes.
Midland Railway (Settle to Carlisle) Act 1866	29 & 30 Vict. c. ccxxiii	16 July 1866
An Act for enabling the Midland Railway Company to construct Railways from Settle to Hawes, Appleby, and Carlisle; and for other Purposes.
Bideford, Appledore, and Westward Ho' Railway Act 1866 or the Bideford, Appledore and Westward Ho! Railway Act 1866	29 & 30 Vict. c. ccxxiv	16 July 1866
An Act for making a Railway from Bideford to Appledore, with a Branch to Westward Ho', in the County of Devon; and for other Purposes.
Guardian Assurance Company's Act 1866	29 & 30 Vict. c. ccxxv	16 July 1866
An Act to enable the Guardian Fire and Life Assurance Company to reduce the Amount of their paid-up Subscription Capital; and to alter certain Provisions of their Deed of Settlement; and to amend "The Guardian Assurance Company's Act, 1850;" (Note: Guardian Assurance Company's Act 1850 (13 & 14 Vict. c. xxv)) and to give further Powers to the Company and the Directors thereof.
Shrewsbury Bridges Act 1866	29 & 30 Vict. c. ccxxvi	16 July 1866
An Act to enable the Shrewsbury Bridges Company to alter the Levels of a Portion of a Road, and to make certain new Roads, and to make a Bridge in lieu of a Bridge authorized by a former Act; (Note: Shrewsbury Bridges Act 1864 (27 & 28 Vict. c. cxix)) and for other Purposes.
South Eastern Railway Act 1866	29 & 30 Vict. c. ccxxvii	16 July 1866
An Act for conferring further Powers upon the South-eastern Railway Company for the Construction of Works and the Acquisition of Lands, and otherwise in relation to their Undertaking; and for other Purposes.
Brean Down Dock Act 1866 (repealed)	29 & 30 Vict. c. ccxxviii	16 July 1866
An Act for making Docks on the River Axe, and a Road thereto, with a Bridge over that River, all in the County of Somerset; and for other Purposes. (Repealed by Brean Down Harbour and Railway Act 1889 (52 & 53 Vict. c. cciv))
Medway Docks Act 1866	29 & 30 Vict. c. ccxxix	16 July 1866
An Act to authorize the Construction of Docks on the West Side of the River Medway at Rochester, with a Railway to connect the same with the London, Chatham and Dover Railway.
New River Company's Act 1866	29 & 30 Vict. c. ccxxx	16 July 1866
An Act to enable the New River Company to raise a further Sum of Money.
Wantage and Great Western Junction Railway Act 1866	29 & 30 Vict. c. ccxxxi	16 July 1866
An Act for making a Railway from the Great Western Railway to Wantage in Berkshire.
Ringley Bridge Act 1866	29 & 30 Vict. c. ccxxxii	16 July 1866
An Act to enable the Justices of the County of Lancaster to erect a new Bridge over the River Irwell in the Townships of Kearsley and Pilkington in the Hundred of Salford, in lieu of an old Bridge there called Ringley Bridge; and for other Purposes.
Lancashire Union Railways Act 1866	29 & 30 Vict. c. ccxxxiii	16 July 1866
An Act to empower the Lancashire Union Railways Company to construct new Railways in the Townships of Farr, Haydock, and Ashton-in-Makerfield, in the County of Lancaster; and for other Purposes.
London, Brighton, and South Coast Railway (Saint Leonard's Deviations) Act 1866	29 & 30 Vict. c. ccxxxiv	16 July 1866
An Act to enable the London, Brighton, and South Coast Railway Company to make new Railways in substitution for Portions of their Saint Leonard's Line, and other Works; and for other Purposes.
South-eastern Railway (Mid Kent Amalgamation Completion) Act 1866	29 & 30 Vict. c. ccxxxv	16 July 1866
An Act for facilitating the carrying into effect of the Act (Note: South-eastern Railway (Mid-Kent) Act 1864 (27 & 28 Vict. c. cccxi)) for the Amalgamation of the Undertaking of the Mid-Kent Railway Company with the Undertaking of the Southeastern Railway Company.
Furness Railway (Whitehaven Amalgamation) Act 1866	29 & 30 Vict. c. ccxxxvi	16 July 1866
An Act for the Amalgamation of the Whitehaven and Furness Junction Railway Company with the Furness Railway Company; and for other Purposes.
Great Northern and Western (of Ireland) Railway Act 1866	29 & 30 Vict. c. ccxxxvii	16 July 1866
An Act to extend for a further Period the Powers of the Great Northern and Western (of Ireland) Railway Company for the Construction of their Railways to Westport and Ballina respectively; and to enable the said Company to raise further Sums of Money; and for other Purposes.
West Bromwich and Walsall Railway Act 1866 (repealed)	29 & 30 Vict. c. ccxxxviii	16 July 1866
An Act to authorize the Construction of "The West Bromwich and Walsall Railway." (Repealed by Statute Law (Repeals) Act 2013 (c. 2))
East and West Junction Railway (Diversion of Roads) Act 1866	29 & 30 Vict. c. ccxxxix	23 July 1866
An Act for authorizing the East and West Junction Railway Company in the Construction of their authorized Railway to divert, alter, and stop up certain Roads in the Parish of Alderminster and County of Worcester.
Aberavon Local Board Act 1866 (repealed)	29 & 30 Vict. c. ccxl	23 July 1866
An Act to authorize the Major, Aldermen, and Burgesses of the Borough of Aberavon, as the Local Board for the District, to purchase the existing Gasworks of the Aberavon Gas and Coal Consumers Company (Limited), and to supply Gas within the said District. (Repealed by Port Talbot Corporation Act 1972 (c. xlix))
Bridge of Allan Water Company's Act 1866	29 & 30 Vict. c. ccxli	23 July 1866
An Act for supplying with Water the Town of Bridge of Allan and Places adjacent.
Presteign, Clun and Bishop's Castle Railway Act 1866	29 & 30 Vict. c. ccxlii	23 July 1866
An Act to authorize the Construction of Railways between Presteign, and Clun and the Craven Arms; and for other Purposes relating to the Undertaking.
Solway Junction Railway (Capital) Act 1866	29 & 30 Vict. c. ccxliii	23 July 1866
An Act to enable the Solway Junction Railway Company to raise further Capital; and for other Purposes.
Walker and Wallsend Union Gas Act 1866	29 & 30 Vict. c. ccxliv	23 July 1866
An Act for incorporating the Walker and Wallsend Union Gas Company; for enabling them to supply Gas to the Parish of Wallsend and Parts of the Parish of Long Benton in Northumberland; and for other Purposes.
Maryport Improvement and Harbour Act 1866	29 & 30 Vict. c. ccxlv	23 July 1866
An Act for defining and extending the Powers of the Trustees of the District and Harbour of Maryport in the County of Cumberland; and for enabling them to improve the Streets and Buildings within the District, and to sewer and drain the same; to establish Waterworks, Gasworks, and Police; and for other Purposes.
Caledonian Railway (Greenock and Gourock Extensions) Act 1866	29 & 30 Vict. c. ccxlvi	23 July 1866
An Act for enabling the Caledonian Railway Company to make Railways to the Albert Harbour at Greenock, and to Gourock in the County of Renfrew, with a Pier at Gourock, and to acquire the Undertaking of the Gourock Harbour Company; and for other Purposes.
Great Yarmouth Port and Haven Act 1866	29 & 30 Vict. c. ccxlvii	23 July 1866
An Act for the Conservancy and Improvement of the Port and Haven of Great Yarmouth and the Rivers connected therewith; for the levying and extinguishing of Tolls and Duties; and for other Purposes.
Llantrissant and Taff Vale Junction Railway Act 1866	29 & 30 Vict. c. ccxlviii	23 July 1866
An Act to enable the Llantrissant and Taff Vale Junction Railway Company to make Railways to join the Railway of the Penarth Harbour, Dock, and Railway Company, and the Ely Valley Railway, and to form an additional Junction with their Llantrissant Common Branch; and for other Purposes.
London and North-western Railway (New Works and Additional Powers) Act 1866	29 & 30 Vict. c. ccxlix	23 July 1866
An Act for conferring additional Powers on the London and North-western Railway Company in relation to their own Undertaking and the Undertakings of other Companies; and for other Purposes.
Mold and Denbigh Junction Railway (Branches, Alterations, &c.) Act 1866	29 & 30 Vict. c. ccl	23 July 1866
An Act to enable the Mold and Denbigh Junction Railway Company to make Branch Railways and a Deviation, and to alter their authorized Railway; and for other Purposes.
North-eastern Railway Company's (Yorkshire Lines) Act 1866 or the North Eastern Railway (Yorkshire Lines) Act 1866	29 & 30 Vict. c. ccli	23 July 1866
An Act to enable the North-eastern Railway Company to construct Branch Railways and other Works in the County of York, and at and near the City of York; to acquire additional Lands; and for other Purposes.
Ogmore Valley Railways Act 1866	29 & 30 Vict. c. cclii	23 July 1866
An Act for authorizing the Ogmore Valley Railways Company to make Extension Railways; to raise additional Monies; and for other Purposes.
Waveney Valley Drainage Act 1866	29 & 30 Vict. c. ccliii	23 July 1866
An Act for the better Drainage of the Valley of the River Waveney in the Counties of Norfolk and Suffolk; and for other Purposes.
Great Western Railway (Wycombe Railway Transfer) Act 1866	29 & 30 Vict. c. ccliv	23 July 1866
An Act to confirm an Agreement for the Transfer of the Wycombe Railway to the Great Western Railway Company.
Great Eastern Railway (Additional Powers) Act 1866	29 & 30 Vict. c. cclv	23 July 1866
An Act to authorize the Great Eastern Railway Company to make certain Railways, and to purchase certain Lands and Buildings for Station Purposes, and to alter the Levels of their Ramsey Branch and Part of One of their Metropolitan Branches between Hanger Lane and West Green Road; and for other Purposes.
Forth and Clyde Navigation (Capital) Act 1866	29 & 30 Vict. c. cclvi	23 July 1866
An Act to authorize the Company of Proprietors of the Forth and Clyde Navigation to raise further Monies.
Central Ireland Railways Act 1866	29 & 30 Vict. c. cclvii	23 July 1866
An Act for making Railways, to be called the Central Ireland Railways; and for other Purposes.
Swansea Harbour Act 1866	29 & 30 Vict. c. cclviii	23 July 1866
An Act to enable the Swansea Harbour Trustees to complete and maintain additional Works, and to raise a further Sum of Money for the Purposes of their Undertaking; and for other Purposes.
Rhymney Railway (New Lines) Act 1866	29 & 30 Vict. c. cclix	23 July 1866
An Act for authorizing the Rhymney Railway Company to make and maintain certain new Lines of Railway in connexion with their Undertaking; and for other Purposes.
Bedford and Northampton Railway Act 1866	29 & 30 Vict. c. cclx	23 July 1866
An Act for authorizing the Bedford and Northampton Railway Company to construct new Lines of Railway; to abandon Portions of their authorized Line; and for other Purposes.
Bray Township Act 1866	29 & 30 Vict. c. cclxi	23 July 1866
An Act for the Improvement of the Town and District of Bray in the Baronies of Rathdown and Counties of Dublin and Wicklow.
Bristol and North Somerset Railway (Additional Capital) Act 1866	29 & 30 Vict. c. cclxii	23 July 1866
An Act to authorize the Bristol and North Somerset Railway Company to raise additional Capital for the Purposes of their Undertaking.
Great Yarmouth Fish Wharves Act 1866	29 & 30 Vict. c. cclxiii	23 July 1866
An Act for the Construction of Fish Wharves and Tramways and for the Execution of other Works at Great Yarmouth; and for other Purposes.
Kingsbridge Railway (Deviations) Act 1866	29 & 30 Vict. c. cclxiv	23 July 1866
An Act to enable the Kingsbridge Railway Company to make Deviations in and to alter the Levels of their authorized Railway; and for other Purposes.
Lynn and Sutton, Spalding and Bourn, and Norwich and Spalding Railways Act 1866 or the Midland and Eastern Railway Act 1866	29 & 30 Vict. c. cclxv	23 July 1866
An Act to amalgamate the Lynn and Sutton Bridge and the Spalding and Bourn Railway Companies, and for a Lease of the Norwich and Spalding Railway to the amalgamated Company; and for other Purposes.
North British Railway (New Works) Act 1866	29 & 30 Vict. c. cclxvi	23 July 1866
An Act to authorize the North British Railway Company to make several Railways and purchase Lands in various Counties; to extend the Times for Purchase of Land and Construction of Works with respect to Part of their Railway System across the Frith of Forth; to make certain Alterations in their Capital; to authorize Agreements with the Corporation of Edinburgh as to a Fruit and Vegetable Market at Edinburgh, and with the Midland Railway Company as to a Goods Station at Carlisle; and for other Purposes.
Peterborough, Wisbeach, and Sutton Railway (Capital) Act 1866	29 & 30 Vict. c. cclxvii	23 July 1866
An Act for authorizing the Peterborough, Wisbeach, and Sutton Railway Company to regulate their existing Share Capital.
Somerset and Dorset Railway Act 1866	29 & 30 Vict. c. cclxviii	23 July 1866
An Act for authorizing the Somerset and Dorset Railway Company to acquire additional Lands, and to raise further Monies; and for other Purposes.
South London Market Act 1866 (repealed)	29 & 30 Vict. c. cclxix	23 July 1866
An Act for authorizing the South London Market Company to raise further Monies; and for other Purposes. (Repealed by Statute Law (Repeals) Act 2013 (c. 2))
Buckley and Wrexham, Mold, and Connah's Quay Railway Companies Act 1866	29 & 30 Vict. c. cclxx	23 July 1866
An Act for confirming certain Articles of Agreement between the Buckley Railway Company and the Wrexham, Mold, and Connah's Quay Railway Company.
Southern Railway (Deviation and Branches) Act 1866 (repealed)	29 & 30 Vict. c. cclxxi	23 July 1866
An Act to empower the Southern Railway Company to make Deviation and Branch Railways; and for other Purposes. (Repealed by Statute Law (Repeals) Act 2013 (c. 2))
Waterford and Limerick Railway (Arrangements) Act 1866	29 & 30 Vict. c. cclxxii	23 July 1866
An Act to authorize the Waterford and Limerick Railway Company to make working and other Agreements with the Great Southern and Western Railway Company and the Great Western Railway Company, or either of them.
Glasgow Police Act 1866 (repealed)	29 & 30 Vict. c. cclxxiii	23 July 1866
An Act to regulate the Police and Statute Labour of the City of Glasgow; and for other Purposes. (Repealed by Statute Law (Repeals) Act 1995 (c. 44))
Swansea Vale Railway Act 1866	29 & 30 Vict. c. cclxxiv	23 July 1866
An Act for facilitating the Traffic of the Swansea Vale Railway Company over the Railways of other Companies; and for other Purposes.
Wandsworth and Putney Gas Act 1866	29 & 30 Vict. c. cclxxv	23 July 1866
An Act to enable the Wandsworth and Putney Gaslight and Coke Company to raise further Capital; and for other Purposes.
Wolverhampton and Walsall Railway Act 1866	29 & 30 Vict. c. cclxxvi	23 July 1866
An Act to authorize the Wolverhampton and Walsall Railway Company to make a Deviation from their authorized Railway, and to construct a short Branch; and for other Purposes with respect to their Undertaking.
Devon Valley and North British Railways (Branches) Act 1866	29 & 30 Vict. c. cclxxvii	30 July 1866
An Act to authorize the Construction of Branch Railways from the Devon Valley Railway into the Mineral Districts of Fife and Clackmannan; and for other Purposes.
Berwickshire Railway Act 1866	29 & 30 Vict. c. cclxxviii	30 July 1866
An Act to authorize the Berwickshire Railway Company to raise additional Capital; and for other Purposes.
Laugharne Railway Act 1866 (repealed)	29 & 30 Vict. c. cclxxix	30 July 1866
An Act to incorporate a Company for making a Railway from the South Wales Railway of the Great Western Railway Company near to Saint Clears Station to Laugharne in the County of Carmarthen, to be called "The Laugharne Railway;" and for other Purposes. (Repealed by Statute Law (Repeals) Act 2013 (c. 2))
Metropolitan Sewage and Essex Reclamation Act 1866	29 & 30 Vict. c. cclxxx	30 July 1866
An Act to authorize the Metropolis Sewage and Essex Reclamation Company to make a new Conduit in lieu of certain Portions of their authorized Conduits; and for other Purposes.
London, Brighton and South Coast Railway (Capital and Powers) Act 1866	29 & 30 Vict. c. cclxxxi	30 July 1866
An Act for defining the Undertaking and Railways of the London, Brighton, and South Coast Railway Company, and for defining and regulating their Capital and Mortgage Debt, and their Powers of raising Monies; and for authorizing them to make and maintain new Lines of Railway; and for other Purposes.
London, Chatham and Dover Railway (Dockyard Branch) Act 1866	29 & 30 Vict. c. cclxxxii	30 July 1866
An Act to authorize the London, Chatham, and Dover Railway Company to make a Branch Railway to Chatham Dockyard, and to make Arrangements with the Admiralty; and for other Purposes.
London, Chatham and Dover Railway (Various Powers) Act 1866	29 & 30 Vict. c. cclxxxiii	30 July 1866
An Act to authorize the London, Chatham, and Dover Railway Company to execute Works in Kent and Surrey; to authorize the Acquisition of additional Lands in London, Middlesex, Surrey, and Kent, and of the Undertakings of the Sittingbourne and Sheerness Railway Company; to extend the Time for completing and purchasing Lands for Undertakings in London, Surrey, and Kent; to amend the Acts relating to the Company; and for other Purposes.
Merthyr, Tredegar and Abergavenny Railway Act 1866	29 & 30 Vict. c. cclxxxiv	30 July 1866
An Act for transferring to the London and North-western Railway Company the outstanding Estate or Interest in the Merthyr, Tredegar, and Abergavenny Railway.
North British Railway (Glasgow Branches) Act 1866	29 & 30 Vict. c. cclxxxv	30 July 1866
An Act to authorize the North British Railway Company to make Railways near Glasgow; and for other Purposes.
Sheffield Waterworks Act 1866 (repealed)	29 & 30 Vict. c. cclxxxvi	30 July 1866
An Act to authorize the Company of Proprietors of the Sheffield Waterworks to construct further Works, to purchase additional Lands, and to raise additional Capital; and for other Purposes. (Repealed by Sheffield Corporation (Consolidation) Act 1918 (8 & 9 Geo. 5. c. lxi))
Great Eastern Railway (Alexandra Park Branch) Act 1866	29 & 30 Vict. c. cclxxxvii	30 July 1866
An Act to authorize the Great Eastern Railway Company to make a certain Railway to connect their System with the Alexandra Palace in the Parish of Tottenham in the County of Middlesex; and for other Purposes.
Great North of Scotland Railway (Amalgamation) Act 1866	29 & 30 Vict. c. cclxxxviii	30 July 1866
An Act to provide for the Sale or Lease to the Great North of Scotland Railway Company of the Undertaking of various neighbouring Companies, or the Amalgamation of those Companies with the Great North of Scotland Railway Company; to authorize the Abandonment of the Extensions of the Banff, Macduff, and Turriff Extension Railway to Macduff; to extend the Time for making the Extension of the Banffshire Railway to Buckie; and for other Purposes.
Llanelly Railway and Dock Company (Further Powers) Act 1866	29 & 30 Vict. c. cclxxxix	30 July 1866
An Act to authorize the Llanelly Railway and Dock Company to construct a Pier at the Mumbles; and for other Purposes.
Muswell Hill Estate and Railways Act 1866	29 & 30 Vict. c. ccxc	30 July 1866
An Act to enable the Muswell Hill Estate Company (Limited) to make certain Railways over their Estate, for giving Access thereto from neighbouring Railways, and to enter into Arrangements for the Use thereof; and for other Purposes.
North British Railway (Camps, &c. Branches) Act 1866	29 & 30 Vict. c. ccxci	30 July 1866
An Act to authorize the North British Railway Company to make certain Railways in connexion with their System in the Counties of Linlithgow, Stirling, and Edinburgh; and for other Purposes.
Caithness Railway Act 1866	29 & 30 Vict. c. ccxcii	30 July 1866
An Act to authorize the Construction of a Railway between Wick and Thurso in the County of Caithness, to be called "The Caithness Railway."
Liverpool Sewage Utilization Act 1866	29 & 30 Vict. c. ccxciii	30 July 1866
An Act for utilizing the Sewage of the Borough of Liverpool; and for other Purposes.
Liverpool Central Station Railway Act 1866	29 & 30 Vict. c. ccxciv	30 July 1866
An Act for transferring to the Manchester, Sheffield, and Lincolnshire, the Great Northern, and the Midland Railway Companies the Powers of the Liverpool Central Station Railway Company; and for other Purposes.
North Eastern Railway (Leeds and Wetherby Branch) Act 1866	29 & 30 Vict. c. ccxcv	30 July 1866
An Act to enable the North-eastern Railway Company to construct a Railway from their Leeds and Selby Branch at Austhorpe to their Church Fenton and Harrogate Branch at Wetherby; and for other Purposes.
Bute Docks Act 1866	29 & 30 Vict. c. ccxcvi	30 July 1866
An Act for conferring on the Trustees and others claiming under the Will of the late Marquess of Bute Powers with respect to the reclaiming of Mud Land, and the making and maintaining of a Dock or Basin and a Pier and Railway and other Works at Cardiff; and for other Purposes.
Gwendreath Valleys Railway Act 1866	29 & 30 Vict. c. ccxcvii	30 July 1866
An Act to separate the Kidwelly Branch and Extension from the rest of the Undertaking of the Carmarthen and Cardigan Railway Company, and to incorporate a Company for the Purposes of the said Branch and Extension.
Midland Railway (Branches, &c.) Act 1866	29 & 30 Vict. c. ccxcviii	30 July 1866
An Act for enabling the Midland Railway Company to construct Branch Railways and other Works; for conferring Powers on them with reference to the Undertakings of other Companies; and for other Purposes.
North Metropolitan Railway Act 1866	29 & 30 Vict. c. ccxcix	30 July 1866
An Act for the Construction of Railways between the Great Western Railway near Southall and the River Thames near the Victoria Docks, to be called "The North Metropolitan Railway;" and for other Purposes.
Weardale and Shildon District Waterworks Act 1866	29 & 30 Vict. c. ccc	30 July 1866
An Act for better supplying the Weardale and Shildon District and other Places in the County of Durham with Water; and for other Purposes.
East India Irrigation and Canal Act 1866	29 & 30 Vict. c. ccci	30 July 1866
An Act to amend the East India Irrigation and Canal Act, 1861, (Note: East India Irrigation and Canal Act 1861 (24 & 25 Vict. c. cviii)) with respect to the Cancellation and Surrender of Shares, and otherwise with respect to the Capital of the Company.
Madras Irrigation and Canal Act 1866	29 & 30 Vict. c. cccii	30 July 1866
An Act to amend the Madras Irrigation and Canal Acts in reference to the Cancellation and Surrender of Shares and the raising of Capital.
Ryde Station Act 1866	29 & 30 Vict. c. ccciii	30 July 1866
An Act for making a Railway and Central Station and erecting Slaughter-houses at Ryde in the Isle of Wight; and for other Purposes.
Aberdare and Central Wales Junction Railway Act 1866 (repealed)	29 & 30 Vict. c. ccciv	30 July 1866
An Act for making a Railway from the Taff Vale Railway at Aberdare to the Neath and Brecon Railway at Capel Coelbren, and a Branch to the Vale of Neath Railway; and for other Purposes. (Repealed by Statute Law (Repeals) Act 2013 (c. 2))
New Romney Railway Act 1866	29 & 30 Vict. c. cccv	30 July 1866
An Act for authorizing the Construction of a Railway in the County of Kent, to be called "The New Romney Railway."
Brecon and Llandovery Junction Railway Amendment Act 1866	29 & 30 Vict. c. cccvi	30 July 1866
An Act for extending the Powers of the Brecon and Llandovery Junction Railway Company.
Great Western Railway (Further Powers) Act 1866	29 & 30 Vict. c. cccvii	30 July 1866
An Act for conferring further Powers on the Great Western Railway Company in relation to their own Undertaking and the Undertakings of other Companies; and for other Purposes.
Greenock and Shaws Water Transfer Act 1866	29 & 30 Vict. c. cccviii	30 July 1866
An Act for the Transfer to a Public Trust of the Waterworks and Property of the Board of Police of the Town of Greenock and of the Shaws Water Joint Stock Company; and for other Purposes.
Greenock Water (Additional Works) Act 1866 (repealed)	29 & 30 Vict. c. cccix	30 July 1866
An Act for better supplying with Water the Town of Greenock and Suburbs thereof, and Districts and Places adjacent, by the Execution of additional Works; and for other Purposes. (Repealed by Greenock Corporation Act 1909 (9 Edw. 7. c. cxxix))
Northampton and Banbury Junction Railway Act 1866	29 & 30 Vict. c. cccx	30 July 1866
An Act to authorize the Northampton and Banbury Junction Railway Company to extend their Railway from Bloekley to Ross; and for other Purposes.
North Western and Charing Cross Railway Act 1866	29 & 30 Vict. c. cccxi	30 July 1866
An Act for authorizing Arrangements between the North-western and Charing Cross Railway Company and the London and North-western Railway Company and the South-eastern Railway Company; and for other Purposes.
Tamar, Kit Hill and Callington Railway Act 1866	29 & 30 Vict. c. cccxii	30 July 1866
An Act to authorize the Mixed Gauge or the Broad Gauge only upon the Tamar, Kit Hill, and Callington Railway, and Arrangements between the Tamar, Kit Hilly and Callington Railway Company and the Saltash and Callington and other Railway Companies; and for other Purposes.
Vale of Crickhowell Railway Act 1866	29 & 30 Vict. c. cccxiii	30 July 1866
An Act to enable the Vale of Crickhowell Railway Company to extend their Railway to the Town of Brecon; and for other Purposes.
East London Eastern Extension Railway Act 1866	29 & 30 Vict. c. cccxiv	6 August 1866
An Act for the Construction of a Railway in connexion with the East London Railway, to be called "The East London Eastern Extension Railway;" and for other Purposes.
Midland Railway (Ashby and Nuneaton, &c.) Act 1866	29 & 30 Vict. c. cccxv	6 August 1866
An Act for enabling the Midland Railway Company to construct Railways for improving the Communication between Ashby-de-la-Zouch and Nuneaton and other Places; and for other Purposes.
Elham Valley Railway Act 1866 (repealed)	29 & 30 Vict. c. cccxvi	6 August 1866
An Act for making a Railway from Canterbury to Hythe in the County of Kent, with Branches to join the London, Chatham, and Dover and South-eastern Railways. (Repealed by Statute Law (Repeals) Act 2013 (c. 2))
Halesowen and Bromsgrove Branch Railways Act 1866	29 & 30 Vict. c. cccxvii	6 August 1866
An Act to enable the Halesowen and Bromsgrove Branch Railways Company to make certain Branch Lines of Railway in the County of Worcester; and for other Purposes.
South Eastern and London, Chatham and Dover (London, Lewes and Brighton) Railways Act 1866 (repealed)	29 & 30 Vict. c. cccxviii	6 August 1866
An Act for making Railways from the South-eastern and London, Chatham, and Dover Railways to various Districts and Places in Kent, Surrey, and Sussex, and to the Towns of Lewes and Brighton; and for other Purposes. (Repealed by London, Lewes and Brighton Railways Abandonment Act 1868 (31 & 32 Vict. c. cxxiii))
Thames Purification Act 1866	29 & 30 Vict. c. cccxix	6 August 1866
An Act for the Purification of the River Thames by the Diversion therefrom of the Sewage of Oxford, Abingdon, Reading, Kingston, Richmond, Twickenham, Isleworth, and Brentford; and for the Collection and Utilization of that Sewage; and for other Purposes.
Anglesey Central Railway Act 1866	29 & 30 Vict. c. cccxx	6 August 1866
An Act to enable the Anglesey Central Railway Company to transfer their Undertaking; and for other Purposes.
Bray and Enniskerry Railway Act 1866	29 & 30 Vict. c. cccxxi	6 August 1866
An Act to authorize the Construction of a Railway from the Dublin, Wicklow, and Wexford Railway near Bray to the Town of Enniskerry; and for other Purposes.
Manchester Division Petty Sessions Court Act 1866 (repealed)	29 & 30 Vict. c. cccxxii	6 August 1866
An Act to amend an Act of the Seventeenth Year of the Reign of Her present Majesty, Cap. 20, (Note: Manchester Division Stipendiary Justice Act 1854 (17 & 18 Vict. c. 20)) and to enable the Justices of the Division of Manchester in the County of Lancaster to provide Courts and other necessary Buildings, and to increase the Rate authorized to be levied by the said Act of the Seventeenth Year of Her present Majesty, and to increase the Remuneration of the Stipendiary Justice for the said Division; and for other Purposes. (Repealed by Manchester Division and Borough of Salford (Stipendiary Justices) Act 1878 (41 & 42 Vict. c. lv))
Millwall Canal Act 1866 (repealed)	29 & 30 Vict. c. cccxxiii	6 August 1866
An Act to authorize the Millwall Canal Company to raise more Money. (Repealed by Port of London (Consolidation) Act 1920 (10 & 11 Geo. 5. c. clxxiii))
Burntisland Harbour and Dock Act 1866 (repealed)	29 & 30 Vict. c. cccxxiv	6 August 1866
An Act for improving the Harbour and making a Dock and other Works at Burntisland; and for other Purposes. (Repealed by Forth Ports Authority Order Confirmation Act 1969 (c. xxxiv))
Caledonian Railway (Edinburgh Station) Act 1866	29 & 30 Vict. c. cccxxv	6 August 1866
An Act for enabling the Caledonian Railway Company to alter the Terminus of their Railway at Edinburgh, to enlarge and improve their Station there, and to erect a Hotel in connexion therewith; and for other Purposes.
Devon Valley and North British Railway Companies (Arrangements) Act 1866	29 & 30 Vict. c. cccxxvi	6 August 1866
An Act to authorize the Devon Valley Railway Company to raise additional Share Capital, and to confirm an Agreement and make Provision for an Amalgamation with the North British Railway Company; and for other Purposes.
Glasgow Bridges Consolidation Act 1866	29 & 30 Vict. c. cccxxvii	6 August 1866
An Act to consolidate and amend the Acts relating to the Bridges over the River Clyde at Glasgow; to provide for the Union of the Trusts and the rebuilding of the Hutchisontown Bridge; and for other Purposes.
Glasgow Corporation Waterworks Amendment Act 1866	29 & 30 Vict. c. cccxxviii	6 August 1866
An Act to authorize the Commissioners of the Glasgow Corporation Waterworks to construct Reservoirs and other Works, and to take Water from the River Clyde; to provide for the Removal of the Weir across the said River; and for other Purposes.
Newport Railway Act 1866	29 & 30 Vict. c. cccxxix	6 August 1866
An Act for making a Railway from the North British Railway to Newport; and for other Purposes.
Pembroke and Tenby Railway Act 1866	29 & 30 Vict. c. cccxxx	6 August 1866
An Act to enable the Pembroke and Tenby Railway Company to extend their Railway to Caermarthen and to Milford Haven; to lease their Undertaking; and for other Purposes.
St. Martin in the Fields Workhouse and Offices Rebuilding Act 1866 (repealed)	29 & 30 Vict. c. cccxxxi	6 August 1866
An Act to provide for the Re-erection of the Workhouse and Offices of Saini Martin-in-the-Fields in the City of Westminster upon new Sites. (Repealed by St. Martin-in-the-Fields Workhouse Fund Appropriation Act 1869 (32 & 33 Vict. c. xlv))
Putney and Fulham New Bridge Amendment Act 1866	29 & 30 Vict. c. cccxxxii	6 August 1866
An Act for authorizing the Extension of Time for the compulsory Purchase of Lands and Completion of Works by the Putney and Fulham Bridge Company; and for other Purposes.
Barry Railway (Extension) Act 1866 (repealed)	29 & 30 Vict. c. cccxxxiii	6 August 1866
An Act for enabling the Barry Railway Company to connect their Railway with the Railway of the Penarth Harbour, Dock, and Railway Company; and for other Purposes. (Repealed by Statute Law (Repeals) Act 2013 (c. 2))
Cambrian Railways (New Works) Act 1866	29 & 30 Vict. c. cccxxxiv	6 August 1866
An Act for empowering the Cambrian Railways Company to deviate a Portion of their authorized Railway; to construct other Works in connexion with their Undertaking; and for other Purposes.
Ellesmere and Glyn Valley Railway Act 1866 (repealed)	29 & 30 Vict. c. cccxxxv	6 August 1866
An Act for making a Railway from Ellesmere to Llansaintffraid Glyn Ceiriog; and for other Purposes. (Repealed by Glyn Valley Tramway Act 1870 (33 & 34 Vict. c. clxvi))
Hounslow and Metropolitan Railway Act 1866	29 & 30 Vict. c. cccxxxvi	6 August 1866
An Act for making a Railway from the Acton and Brentford Railway to Hounslow; and for other Purposes.
Ardmore Harbour Act 1866	29 & 30 Vict. c. cccxxxvii	6 August 1866
An Act for making and maintaining a Harbour in Ardmore Bay in the Firth of Clyde.
Belgravia and South Kensington New Road and Improvement Act 1866	29 & 30 Vict. c. cccxxxviii	6 August 1866
An Act to authorize the Construction of a new Road from Eaton Square to Brompton Road, and Improvements connected therewith.
Limerick and Castle Connell Railway Act 1866	29 & 30 Vict. c. cccxxxix	6 August 1866
An Act for enabling the Limerick and Castle Connell Railway Company to extend their Railway to the River Shannon; and for other Purposes.
South Essex Railway Act 1866 (repealed)	29 & 30 Vict. c. cccxl	6 August 1866
An Act to enable the South Essex Railway Company to make a Railway to the London, Tilbury, and Southend Railway at Pitsea. (Repealed by Statute Law (Repeals) Act 2013 (c. 2))
Bo'ness and Grangemouth Railway Act 1866	29 & 30 Vict. c. cccxli	6 August 1866
An Act for making a Railway from the North British Railway to Bo'ness and Grangemouth; and for other Purposes.
Caledonian Railway (Lanarkshire and Midlothian Branches) Act 1866	29 & 30 Vict. c. cccxlii	6 August 1866
An Act for enabling the Caledonian Railway Company to make certain Branch Railways in the Counties of Lanark and Midlothian; and for other Purposes.
Colnbrook Railway Act 1866	29 & 30 Vict. c. cccxliii	6 August 1866
An Act for making Railways from the Great Western Railway at or near West Drayton in the County of Middlesex to Colnbrook, and to the Windsor Branch of the London and South-western Railway at Staines, in the County of Middlesex; and for other Purposes.
Louth and Lincoln Railway Act 1866	29 & 30 Vict. c. cccxliv	6 August 1866
An Act for making a Railway in Lincolnshire from Louth to the Five Mite House Station of the Great Northern Railway (Loop Line); to be called "The Louth and Lincoln Railway."
Teme Valley Railway Act 1866 (repealed)	29 & 30 Vict. c. cccxlv	6 August 1866
An Act for making a Railway from Worcester to Tenbury, to be called "The Teme Valley Railway." (Repealed by Statute Law (Repeals) Act 2013 (c. 2))
Pagham Harbour Reclamation Act 1866	29 & 30 Vict. c. cccxlvi	6 August 1866
An Act to incorporate a Company for the Construction of Works and Reclamation of Lands in and near Pagham Harbour in the County of Sussex; and for other Purposes.
Delabole Railway and Bossinney Harbour Act 1866	29 & 30 Vict. c. cccxlvii	6 August 1866
An Act to incorporate a Company for making a Railway from Delabole to Bossinney, with an Extension to Bossinney Harbour and other Works there, and a Branch near Trewarmet, in the County of Cornwall; and for other Purposes.
Waterford, New Ross and Wexford Junction Railway Act 1866	29 & 30 Vict. c. cccxlviii	10 August 1866
An Act for incorporating the Waterford, New Ross, and Wexford Junction Railway Company, and for authorizing them to purchase the Bagenalstown and Wexford Railway, and to make Branch Railways; and for other Purposes.
Brampton and Longtown Railway Act 1866 (repealed)	29 & 30 Vict. c. cccxlix	10 August 1866
An Act for making a Railway from the North British (Border Union) Railway near Longtown to Brampton; and for other Purposes. (Repealed by Statute Law (Repeals) Act 2013 (c. 2))
Caledonian and Scottish North Eastern Railways Amalgamation Act 1866	29 & 30 Vict. c. cccl	10 August 1866
An Act for authorizing the Amalgamation of the Scottish North-eastern Railway Company with the Caledonian Railway Company; and for other Purposes.
Cheshire Lines Act 1866	29 & 30 Vict. c. cccli	10 August 1866
An Act for granting to the Great Northern Railway Company Running Powers over a Portion of the Newton and Compstall Branch Railway of the Manchester, Sheffield, and Lincolnshire Railway Company; and for authorizing the said Two Companies and the Midland Railway Company to execute certain Works, and for authorizing the Great Northern Railway Company and the Midland Railway Company to become joint Owners with the Manchester, Sheffield, and Lincolnshire Railway Company of that Company's Godley and Woodley Branch Railway; and for transferring to the said Three Companies certain Powers of the Chester and West Cheshire Junction Railway Company; and for other Purposes.
Imperial Gas Act 1866	29 & 30 Vict. c. ccclii	10 August 1866
An Act to authorize the Imperial Gaslight and Coke Company to raise more Money.
Maidstone and Ashford Railway Act 1866	29 & 30 Vict. c. cccliii	10 August 1866
An Act for making a Railway from Maidstone to Ashford; and for other Purposes.
Newport Pagnell Railway (Extension) Act 1866	29 & 30 Vict. c. cccliv	10 August 1866
An Act to authorize the Newport Pagnell Railway Company to extend their Railway to the Northampton and Peterborough Line of the London and North-western Railway Company, and to the authorized Bedford and Northampton Railway; and for other Purposes.
North British Railway (Dundee Branch) Act 1866	29 & 30 Vict. c. ccclv	10 August 1866
An Act to enable the North British Railway Company to make Branch Railways at Dundee; and for other Purposes.
Great Western Railway (Vale of Neath Amalgamation) Act 1866	29 & 30 Vict. c. ccclvi	10 August 1866
An Act for the Amalgamation of the Vale of Neath Railway Company with the Great Western Railway Company; and for other Purposes.
Wye Valley Railway Act 1866	29 & 30 Vict. c. ccclvii	10 August 1866
An Act for making Railways from the South Wales Line of the Great Western Railway to the Coleford, Monmouth, Usk, and Pontypool Railway, and to the authorized Line of the South Wales and Great Western Direct Railway; and for other Purposes.
Wrexham, Mold and Connah's Quay Railway (Additional Powers) Act 1866	29 & 30 Vict. c. ccclviii	10 August 1866
An Act for the Extension of the Wrexham, Mold, and Connah's Quay Railway to Buckley; and for other Purposes.
Wrexham, Mold and Connah's Quay Railway (Extensions) Act 1866	29 & 30 Vict. c. ccclix	10 August 1866
An Act to enable the Wrexham, Mold, and Connah's Quay Railway Company to extend their Railway to Connah's Quay; to make a Deviation in their authorized Railway; and for other Purposes.
Sligo and Ballaghaderreen Junction Railway Act 1866	29 & 30 Vict. c. ccclx	10 August 1866
An Act to renew and extend the Powers of the Sligo and Ballaghaderreen Junction Railway Company; and for other Purposes.
Brighton West Pier Act 1866	29 & 30 Vict. c. ccclxi	10 August 1866
An Act to incorporate the Brighton West Pier Company; and to enable them to construct a Pier at Brighton in the County of Sussex; and for other Purposes.
Downpatrick, Dundrum and Newcastle Railway Act 1866	29 & 30 Vict. c. ccclxii	10 August 1866
An Act to authorize the Construction of a Railway from Dowmpatrick through Dundrum to Newcastle in the County of Down.
London, Chatham and Dover Railway (New Streets) Act 1866	29 & 30 Vict. c. ccclxiii	10 August 1866
An Act to authorize the London, Chatham, and Dover Railway Company to make new Streets and Alterations of Streets for improving the Access to their Ludgate Station; to authorize the Kent Coast Railway Company to make a new Road at Ramsgate; and to confer Powers and impose Obligations on the Corporation of the City of London with respect to the new and altered Streets; and for other Purposes.

=== Private acts ===
Short title	Citation	Royal assent
Long title
Buchanan's Estate Act 1866	29 & 30 Vict. c. 1 Pr.	16 July 1866
An Act to authorize the Sale of the Entailed Estate of Arden in the County of Dumbarton, and to apply the Prices to be received for the same in the Purchase of other Lands in Scotland to be entailed in lieu thereof.
Clare College (Blythe's Benefaction) Act 1866	29 & 30 Vict. c. 2 Pr.	23 July 1866
An Act for the better Regulation of Doctor Blythe's Benefaction to Clare College, Cambridge.
Taylor's Estate Act 1866	29 & 30 Vict. c. 3 Pr.	23 July 1866
An Act to authorize a Sale of Part of the Estates of the late Joseph Taylor of Gledhow Mount in the Parish of Leeds in the West Riding of the County of York, Esquire.
Troyte's Estate Act 1866	29 & 30 Vict. c. 4 Pr.	23 July 1866
An Act for authorizing the Trustees of the Will of the Reverend Edward Berkeley Troyte, Doctor of Laws, deceased, to pull down the existing Family Mansion of Huntsham Court, and to build a new Family Mansion on a fresh Site on Part of the Estates subject to the Limitations of the same Will, situate in the Parish of Huntsham in the County of Devon; and for other Purposes.
Rawson's Estate Act 1866	29 & 30 Vict. c. 5 Pr.	30 July 1866
An Act for authorizing a Lease to the Mayor, Aldermen, and Burgesses of the Borough of Bradford in the County of York of Part of the Settled Estates devised by the Will of Benjamin Rawson Esquire, deceased.
Sutherland-Walker's Estate Act 1866	29 & 30 Vict. c. 6 Pr.	30 July 1866
An Act for authorizing Leases and Sales of Estates in the West Riding of the County of York which are subject to the Limitations of the Will of Ann Walker deceased.
Hamilton's Estate Act 1866	29 & 30 Vict. c. 7 Pr.	6 August 1866
An Act to confirm an Agreement with Respect to the Estate of the late Agnes Hamilton, and to provide for the Administration of the Funds left by her for the Payment of Annuities.
Market Bosworth School Act 1866	29 & 30 Vict. c. 8 Pr.	6 August 1866
An Act for the better Regulation of Market Bosworth School.
Charles Sheils' Almshouses Charity Act 1866	29 & 30 Vict. c. 9 Pr.	6 August 1866
An Act for amending "Charles Sheils' Almshouses Charity Act, 1864." (Note: Charles Sheils' Almshouses Charity Act 1864 (27 & 28 Vict. c. 8 Pr.))
Lloyd's Estates (Partition) Act 1866	29 & 30 Vict. c. 10 Pr.	10 August 1866
An Act for the Partition or Division of certain Estates in the Counties of Flint and Denbigh formerly Property of Dorothea Lloyd and others.
Lady Slaney's (Trust) Estate Act 1866	29 & 30 Vict. c. 11 Pr.	10 August 1866
An Act to authorize the Wardens and Commonalty of the Mystery of Grocers of the City of London, as Trustees under the Will of Dame Margaret Slaney deceased, to consent to the Union of the Benefices of Allhallows Staining and Saini Catherine Coleman in the City of London, and for enabling the Trustees to carry into more complete Effect the Trusts of the Will.
Cashel's Divorce Act 1866 (Note: This act was not printed by the Queens's Printer.)	29 & 30 Vict. c. 12 Pr.	30 April 1866
An Act to dissolve the Marriage of Rowan Francis Cashel, Doctor of Medicine, with Emily Harriett his now Wife, and to enable him to marry again; and for other Purposes.
Lowther's Naturalization Act 1866	29 & 30 Vict. c. 13 Pr.	18 May 1866
An Act to naturalize Francis William Lowther, Esquire, a Lieutenant in Her Majesty's Royal Navy, and to grant to and confer upon him all the Rights, Privileges, and Capacities of a natural-born Subject of Her Majesty the Queen.
Whitmarsh's Disabilities Act 1866	29 & 30 Vict. c. 14 Pr.	18 May 1866
An Act to enable William Whitmarsh Clerk to execute his Office of a Priest and to hold any Ecclesiastical Preferment or Office in the United Church of England and Ireland within Her Majesty's Dominions.

=== Sources ===
- Rickards, George Kettilby, ed. (1866). The Statutes of the United Kingdom of Great Britain and Ireland, 29 & 30 Victoria. London: Eyre and Spottiswoode – via Internet Archive.
- A Collection of the Public General Statutes passed in the Twenty-ninth and Thirttieth Years of the Reign of Her Majesty Queen Victoria. London: Eyre and Spottiswoode. 1866 – via Internet Archive.
- The Public General Acts of the United Kingdom of Great Britain and Ireland: Anno Regni Victoriæ Britanniarum Reginæ Vicesimo Nono. London: Eyre and Spottiswoode. 1866 – via Google Books.

== See also ==
- List of acts of the Parliament of the United Kingdom
