= Easements in English law =

Rights in English land law over another's land

Easements in English law are certain rights in English land law that a person has over another's land. Rights recognised as easements range from very widespread forms of rights of way, most rights to use service conduits such as telecommunications cables, power supply lines, supply pipes and drains, rights to use communal gardens and rights of light to more strained and novel forms. All types are subject to general rules and constraints. As one of the formalities in English law express, express legal easements must be created by deed.

Some classes, types, of easement are heavily constrained — the courts of England and Wales will only uphold these as easements subject to wide-reaching public policy, chiefly property rights interference, tests they have laid down in precedent. Similar tests apply to the implication of easements. If they fail on any of these tests the right claimed may be interpreted as a "mere" licence, typically a right of use revocable at will. Details of the use, wording and history of certain rights is pivotal. Prime examples of express purported easements which will only be upheld on particular facts are the use of a communal garden with a public dimension, a neighbour's lavatory, or use of parts of another person's land for parking.

In all cases the neighbouring, impacted, "servient" land does not have to be adjoining.

The necessity of easements is shown by the Law Commission's 2008 statistical finding that express easements exist over or under at least 65% of registered freehold titles. In many cases it is impossible for a land owner or tenant to access a public highway without an easement of a right of way over intervening land. The creation of easements is usually done expressly by deed, but easements may be implied where they are necessary, or would be reasonably expected to be held by a land owner, an approach which reduces legal fees but is not altogether uncontroversial, and has been the subject of recent reform proposals.

== Characteristics of easements ==
Whilst an easement is essentially a right over another's land, any right claimed as an easement must satisfy the common law definition, outlined in the case of Re Ellenborough Park. Here, Danckwerts J laid out essential characteristics of an easement:

1. There must be a dominant and a servient tenement;
2. The easement must accommodate the dominant tenement, that is, be connected with its enjoyment and for its benefit;
3. The dominant and servient owners must be different persons;
4. The right claimed must be capable of forming the subject-matter of a grant.

The first requirement – that there must be two distinct plots of land affected – is central to the definition of an easement. A right of way granted to an individual is granted in their capacity as a land owner; if a right of way is granted to an individual who is not a land owner, it is merely a license.

Next, it must be shown that the right is connected with the enjoyment of the dominant tenement in some way. It is important to this end that the right must benefit an individual in their capacity as a land owner, and not merely form a personal right. For example, it has been judicially stated that a right of way over a plot of land in Northumberland to an estate in Kent would not form the requisite benefit, the proximity of the two pieces of land being too remote. It was recognised in Re Ellenborough Park however that an easement need not be over an adjacent property, though there must clearly be some reasonable connection in which the dominant tenement can be benefitted.

An easement can not be recognised where it the dominant and servient tenement are under common ownership. However, rights may be recognised as 'quasi-easements', which can then be implied as full easements upon the conveyance of the land in question.

The most problematic characteristic of an easement is that it must be capable of forming a grant by deed. The right must therefore be certain and definite in its purpose, and more importantly, that the courts are willing to recognise it as a right capable of being an easement. Many claimed rights fail this last criterion, for example, rights which require positive action by the owner of a servient tenement are unlikely to be granted, as are negative rights, which restrict the use of land. Rights which are excessive in nature are equally unlikely to be upheld. In Copeland v Greenhalf a claim to store unlimited vehicles on a neighbour's land failed, with the interference and right claimed being too great to be allowed as an easement.

== Comparison with other rights ==
Easements are distinct from restrictive covenants and the court will not allow the creation of an easement where the right is in substance a restrictive covenant. Showing a restrictive covenant exists requires demonstrating different criteria are met and a restrictive covenant operates only in equity and not at the common law, whereas an easement can operate at either. An instrument that imposes a negative obligation on another tenement will normally be a restrictive covenant, although there are exceptions – the right to light, capable of being an easement, acts to prevent the owner of the servient tenement from acting inconsistently with it.

Easements are also separate from natural rights, which operate universally and do not have to be created. Some natural rights appear similar to easements. For example, there is a natural right to support of one's land. This does not, however, extend to buildings upon the land or the consequences on the land of building upon it. The operate of prescription to bring about a right of support of buildings as well as land in the form of an easement limits the operation of this natural right, however. Natural rights are only actionable after the fact – where damage has already occurred; the neighbouring landowner cannot be compelled to take preventative steps or give support in any particular fashion. The right to water from a stream or river is another natural right which may be extended through the operation of an easement. Easements in this area must also be considered in light of statutory regimes, particularly in the commercial context. There is also a public right to fish and navigate on the foreshore, although this is limited in several respects.

Covenants are also separate to public rights. These include rights acquired as of custom – one being, for example, the right to hold a market in a particular location – thus acting in a similar way to an easement. However, in order to show a right as of custom it must be shown that the use dates back to at least 1189 and so these are rare. More common are rights of common. These are now regulated by the Commons Act 2006 which laid down a system of exclusive registration – all rights must now be registered if they are to operate. Thus new rights of common can only take effect by express grant. Rights of way often form the subject of easements, but public rights of way take effect without the need for a covenant. As well as the public highway, rights over common land and open country are also granted to the public, now regulated by the Countryside and Rights of Way Act 2000.

== Creation of easements ==
=== Express grant ===
Section 1(2) of the Law of Property Act 1925 states that easements are an interest capable of being legal, with s.52 of that act stating that all conveyances (transfers of interests in land) will be void unless created by deed. Therefore, for an express legal easement (which will automatically bind all successors) to be formed rather than simply equitable. it must have been created by deed. A legal easement must be registered against the dominant and servient land ("tenements"), if their titles are registered, to take effect. The benefit of legal easements pass automatically on the transfer of the dominant tenement or part of the dominant tenement.

=== Implied easement ===
Easements may also arise by implication where a vendor sells one plot of land but retains another neighbouring plot. Easements may arise in favour of the retained plot (reservation) or the sold plot (grant). Because a presumption operates that a vendor will have had ample opportunity to insert into the documents of sale a clause in his favour, the scope of implied reservation is much smaller than that of implied grant. Where the vendor sells two neighbouring plots (as determined by time of contract, not of conveyance) both plots will fall under the rules of implied grant with regard to the other. Two plots sold at the same auction will fall under provision, for example, but a period of a month between contracts is too long. Implied easements act at law, not in equity, because the effect is the same as if the provision had been express. Any requirement of registration would clearly be incompatible with the concept of an implied easement, so none is applied.

==== Implied grant ====
There are several circumstances where the grant of an easement may be implied, usually occurring on the conveyance of land. Where land is transferred, subject to contrary intention, existing easements are automatically conveyed under section 62 of the Law of Property Act 1925. Additionally – and controversially in some cases – 'precarious' rights, such as licenses or personal rights may be transformed into legal easements, as demonstrated in International Tea Stores Co v Hobbs and Hair v Gillman. In these cases a right of way (and right to park respectively) granted as licences were held to have been legally transformed into an easement, following the conveyance of the impacted (servient) land. A limitation of the section is that it does not act to reserve easements impliedly; for example, a land owner in common ownership of two plots of land could not claim that, after selling one plot, his remaining plot should have an easement for right of light implied. Other circumstances where easements may be implied are where they are necessary for the enjoyment of land.

==== Implied reservation ====
For reserved easements to be implied, they must be necessary either for the use of the land in general or for the use which the parties together intend the land to be put.

The first of these categories covers those cases where the land would be landlocked but for the proposed easement, but seems to extend no further than that. It has long been the case that any access, even if by water or inconvenient, will be enough to defeat a claim of necessity, although there are signs that courts might be more willing in the future to consider a wider approach, perhaps only vehicular access. A claim of necessity will not be defeated by an access provided by revokable licence, or where a building would need to be demolished to use it. In Nickerson v Barraclough, the Court of Appeal decided that the necessity requirement was based on the presumed intention of the parties at the time of the grant. It should therefore follow that subsequent events cannot destroy an easement arising by implied reservation, although one pre-Victorian case suggested that it might.

The second category includes cases like Wong v Beaumont Property Trust Ltd (although in that case, it operated to bring about an implied grant). The defendant leased a series of cellars to the claimant, requiring that they be used only as a restaurant. In order to comply with trading laws, however, the claimant was required by law, if he wished to use the cellars as a restaurant, to install ventilation ducts on the part of the building retained by the defendant. The court decided to imply a grant in that case because it was necessary for the carrying on the business required in the lease. As stated by Lord Atkinson in that case, it must be necessary, not merely reasonable or common in properties of that type or in that location. Where the right is reciprocal, for example support, then the rules of necessity are more relaxed.

=== Prescription ===
Where a right has long been physically enjoyed by a land owner, it may be upheld ("prescribed") as an easement with or without a dispute with the owner of the impacted land ("servient tenement"). To have done so it must meet the criteria of an easement, and the claimant must be able to show the use was not by force, stealth, or by permission, and continued for a period of twenty years. A land owner may be, but need not be, aware of such a use over his land. The claimant of the uses will see their claim rejected if that claimant has reason to believe that the land owner knows of and has objected to the claimed uses. It has been stated that:

"A landowner who wishes to stop the acquisition of prescriptive rights must not acquiesce and suffer in silence"

Such rights can be registered. The claimant must produce evidence, in a statement of truth or statutory declaration or a chain of such documents covering previous owners, of continuous use as of right, by or on behalf of and against the freehold owners, for a period of at least 20 years. The statement of truth or statutory declaration must set out in detail the use and enjoyment relied upon to substantiate the claim. The right claimed must be one that could have been lawfully granted. The Land Registry has form ST4, for a typical statement of truth related to prescriptive easements.

"Even if the claimant produces this evidence, it does not mean an easement has necessarily been acquired. Where the claim is based on common law prescription [rather than statutory prescription], the owner of the burdened land may be able to establish that the right could not possibly have been exercised from 1189 onwards. Where the claim is based on lost modern grant, the owner may be able to establish that nobody could have lawfully granted the easement. In these cases, there is no easement.

== Transfer of legal easements ==
The benefit of a legal easement will pass to the next owner of that tenement without express words. This was the position of the common law and is now reflected in both sections 62 and 187 of the Law of Property Act 1925. If the dominant tenement is leased, even if only at equity, the benefit of the legal easement will still pass to the lessee and it will remain an easement at law albeit one enforceable by the lessee in equity only.

== Equitable easements ==
Equitable easements have the same basic requirements as easements at law concerning their subject matter. Easements are recognised as arising in equity in at least three circumstances. The first is where section 1(2)(b) of the Law of Property Act 1925, requiring an easement to be "absolute in possession or a term of years absolute", renders an easement incapable of existing as an interest at law. This includes easements for periods of uncertain duration, such as those ending when a particular event happens (the passing of planning permission over one of the tenements, for example). More controversially this category also includes easements for life, similarly incapable of existing at law. Although the topic has not arisen in the courts since at least 1925, it is difficult to show that as easement for life accommodated the dominant tenement, since it is inherently personal in nature. Rights purporting to be easements for life would, if they were rejected as easements, be licences instead and take effect through contract. The second category involves those cases where a specifically enforceable contract to create an easement has taken effect but the easement has not been granted. Here, the regular principles of equity will operate to bring about an easement, since "equity regards as done those things which ought to be done". The third category is where the grantor holds only an equitable interest himself. The most common occasion where this will happen is where an easement is created by operation of a testamentary disposition. Where there is a will, legal title vests in the executors of the estate until transferred to the deceased's personal representatives, but any devised interests operate at equity from the time of disposition.

A fourth category, equitable easements arising by virtue of proprietary estoppel, is contested. Cases such as ER Ives Investments Ltd v High and Crabb v Arun District Council have been offered in support of their existence; however, some commentators prefer to analyse these cases as giving rise to a right distinct from an easement or a legal easement respectively. This makes an important difference when it comes to binding third-party purchasers.

Where land is registered, as is now common, there are further circumstances where an equitable easement will arise. Where both the dominant and servient tenements are registered, easements must be registered against both titles under the terms of the Land Registration Act 1925. Failure to do so will render them easements in equity only, although they will still bind purchasers under rule 258 of the Land Registration Rules 1925 (SR&O 1925/1093). Where the servient land is unregistered, it is likely that the easement will not have to be registered against the dominant title, even if that is itself registered land. This has been disputed, however, and is significant because if legal would bind successors after first registration whereas an equitable easement would require registration as a land charge. Rule 250(1) allows for easements to arise in equity through prescription where the title is registered, but a right arising through prescription would be created as a legal easement and there seems to be no part of this process where the owner of the dominant tenement has a right in equity only.

The benefit of an equitable easement passes with the transfer of the dominant tenement. Whether section 62 of the Law of Property Act 1925 can operate to turn an equitable easement into a legal easement upon conveyance of the dominant tenement is unclear. On the one hand, it would seem odd that a mere licence could become a legal easement through the section, when the much closer equitable easement could not; on the other hand, construing the section in this way is unnecessary from the perspective of the purchaser, since a right enforceable in equity will be almost as useful as one enforceable at common law.

An equitable easement when the servient tenement is unregistered is enforceable against a purchaser for value only when properly registered under the terms of the Land Charges Act 1972. Equitable easements arising by virtue of a contract to grant an easement are registerable as either estate contracts or equitable easements. Where the servient tenement is registered, the registration of an equitable easement at the Land Registry can take place through mere notice or caution and will then bind purchasers. Alternatively, it will still bind purchasers if it constitutes an "overriding interest". As confirmed in the case of Thatcher v Douglas, section 70(1)(c) of the Land Registration Act 1925 and rule 258 of the Land Registration Rules 1925 will operate to ensure that almost all equitable easements constitute overriding interests.

== Termination of easements ==
=== Deed of release or surrender ===
This is a document usually headed ‘deed of release’ (or similar), and optionally with ‘of easement’ or ‘of easements’ appended to the title.

All interested parties in the benefit of the easement must be parties to the deed or consent to the release, including:

- the registered proprietor/owner of the dominant land (land enjoying the easement)
- any chargee (usually termed the mortgagee) of the dominant land (land enjoying the easement)
- any other party whose interest was noted in the register for the dominant land and who would be adversely affected by the release. For example, if there was a contract for sale noted in the register for the dominant land, the person having the benefit of the contract would have to be a party or consent.
- the servient land owner, perhaps, if as is rarer than most instances the easement grants them benefit

In New Zealand, the law reflects the older alternate legal vocabulary in that "surrender" is often used. In England and Wales it had an easements application synonymous with release. Surrender is generally, for clarity, confined to a class of ending of leases, occupational rights, goods and similar rights in English law as has tended towards a more monetary character.

=== Determination of lease to which the easement is appurtenant ===
This is the formal, Latin-based legal language for the ending of a lease which, as in most leases, had the boon of an easement or set of easements.

Easements granted in leases normally come to an end with the lease.

Where a registered lease has terminated and an application is made in the standard Land Registry Application Form to close the title, completion of the application will mean removal of any entry in respect of the benefit of an appurtenant easement.

=== Merger, unity of possession and ownership ===
There must be unification of both ownership and possession of the dominant land and of the servient land. The rights may by continued use fall, that is evolve, to being quasi-easements and then be revived depending on the terms of a re-splitting of the title i.e. the later transfer of a relevant portion of the unified land, or effectively be revived by necessity. Assuming not, or in all cases at any time during unified ownership, entries seemingly confirming an easement at the Land Registry can at any time after unification be removed.

=== Abandonment allowed by law ===
The person entitled to the easement must not only have stopped exercising it, but also to have “demonstrated a fixed intention never at any time thereafter to assert the right himself or to attempt to transmit it to anyone else” The circumstances that are claimed to amount to abandonment must be set out in a statutory declaration or Statement of Truth.

=== By statute ===
An easement can be expressly, or impliedly, extinguished or modified by statute.

== Case law ==
- Moncrieff v Jamieson [2007] UKHL 42.
- Hill v Tupper (1863) 2 H & C 121
- Re Ellenborough Park [1956] Ch 131
- Pugh v Savage [1970] 2 QB 373
- Aldred's Case (1610) 9 Co Rep 57
- Webb v Bird (1862) 13 CB (NS) 841
- Bass v Gregory (1890) 25 QBD 481
- Cable v Bryant [1908] 1 Ch 259
- Prescription Act 1832 s 3
- Hunter v Canary Wharf Ltd [1997] 2 All ER 426
- Keppel v Bailey (1843) 2 My & K 517
- Dyce v Lady James Hay (1852) 1 Macq 305
- Phipps v Pears [1965] 1 QB 76
- Crow v Wood [1971] 1 QB 77
- Dalton v Angus (1881) 6 App Cas 740
- Law of Property Act 1925, section 1(2)
- Titchmarsh v Royston Water Co (1900) 81 LT 673
- Nickerson v Barraclough [1981] 2 WLR 773
- Access to Neighbouring Land Act 1992
- Law of Property Act 1925, section 62
- LRA 2002 Sch 3, para 3
- Crabb v Arun DC
- Payne v Inwood (1997) 74 P &CR 42
- International Tea Stores v Hobbs [1903] 2 Ch 165
- Conveyancing Act 1881 s 6
- Wong v Beaumont Property Trust [1965] 1 BE 173
- Wheeldon v Burrows (1879) 12 Ch D 31
- Wheeler v Saunders [1995] 2 All ER 697
- Kent v Kavanagh [2007] Ch 1
- Benn v Hardinge (1992) 66 P & CR 246
- Bosomworth v Faber (1995) 69 P & CR 288
- Huckvale v Aegean Hotels (1989) 58 P & CR 163

== See also ==
- English land law
- English property law
