= Numerus clausus (law) =

Concept of property law

The numerus clausus (lit. 'closed number') is a concept of property law which limits the number of types of right that the courts will acknowledge as having the character of "property". Several consequences follow from a right having the nature of property, as opposed to being a personal right, like a contract or obligation to pay compensation. Historically, the law has given privileged remedies to the holders of property rights over personal claims. These have included priority in payment from an insolvent debtor, a greater likelihood of being awarded specific performance, and security in remaining in possession of land or some other asset against termination of the right to possess. It holds especial importance in land law and corporate law.

== History ==
The numerus clausus principle has its roots in Roman law.

== England & Wales ==
In the United Kingdom, and particularly in the jurisprudence of the English courts, it is well established that individuals cannot freely create new categories of property right themselves: it has to be recognised by courts. This was held to be true in the 19th century in Keppell v Bailey and Hill v Tupper as a matter of public policy. In the 20th century, in National Provincial Bank Ltd v Ainsworth with a more open approach, Lord Wilberforce stated that

Before a right or an interest can be admitted into the category of property, or of a right affecting property, it must be definable, identifiable by third parties, capable in its nature of assumption by third parties, and have some degree of permanence or stability.

A widely held view is that a numerus clausus, or a property right limit, serves to protect wealth in the scope where it already exists, and does not need extension. This tends to be contested on the basis acknowledgement of property rights simply masks a privilege for people who have enough bargaining power to exercise the freedom of contract for the various privileges that property rights confer, such as priority in insolvency, security of tenure, a right to trace or follow an asset, and a greater likelihood of specific performance as a remedy.

Under English law today, there are fourteen property rights in the numerus clausus, as follows.

1. freehold ownership
2. easements, for the benefit of another piece of land, right to use land in a certain way, e.g. right of way
3. restrictive covenants, for the benefit of another piece of land, a restriction on the owner’s use, e.g. to not build
4. leases, exclusive possession for a defined period of time
5. mortgages, a security to take possession of land if an obligation is unfulfilled
6. rights under trusts, entitling beneficiaries to something
7. licenses coupled with an interest, allowing someone to enter to gain access to assets
8. profit a prendre, rights allowing one person to enter and take things like coal, timber or game
9. rentcharges, since the Rentcharges Act 1977 only in exiguous circumstances, a right to own land in return for periodical payments to someone else
10. rights of entry, especially found with leases and rentcharges if rent is not paid
11. estate contracts, rights arising where parties intend to create or purport to create some other right but have not yet done so
12. options and pre-emption rights, i.e. to demand a right under specified conditions
13. 'mere equities', rights to rescind a transaction if it is vitiated by mispresentation, undue influence and so on, under the Land Registration Act 2002 ss 115–116(b)
14. home rights, i.e. to occupy a home by virtue of a family relationship under the Family Law Act 1996 s 30

Before the Law of Property Act 1925, the life estate and the entail would have also counted as property rights, but they were abolished except as beneficial interests under a trust.

== Germany ==
In German law, the numerus clausus principle has a constitutional foundation and limits property rights in their number (Typenzwang) and content (Typenfixierung).

== Europe ==
Many other European states show equal doctrines. Exceptions include France and Spain.

== Australia ==
The concept is also applicable in Australian law, comprising fullest interests that provide the right to possession, lesser interests, and security interests.

== Theory ==
There are competing views about the desirability of having a limited numerus clausus of property rights, as well as what counts as having a proprietary quality.

== See also ==
- English land law
