= Colls v Home and Colonial Stores =

English tort law case

- Decided: 2 May 1904
- Citation: [1904] UKHL 1
- Transcript: judgment

Colls v Home and Colonial Stores is an English tort law case concerning the entitlement to daylight where a right to light exists.

== Facts ==
Home and Colonial Stores owned land at 44 Worship Street, Shoreditch, London EC2. They proposed to erect a tall building on the site. Colls owned a property immediately opposite number 44 and objected to the erection of the new building due to the effect this would have on light to a clerks’ office on the ground floor of his building.

He applied for an injunction to restrain the new development. He argued that he was entitled to an easement, under section 3 of the Prescription Act 1832, in respect of all the light currently enjoyed by his building.

== Judgment ==
The House of Lords held that Colls was entitled to "sufficient light" to light his premises "according to the ordinary notions of mankind". As, he would have in excess of this amount, even after the erection of the new building, he had not suffered an actionable interference with his easement of light.

The extent of the entitlement to light was described by Lord Lindley in the following terms:

"Generally speaking an owner of ancient lights is entitled to sufficient light according to the ordinary notions of mankind for the comfortable use and enjoyment of his house as a dwelling-house, if it is a dwelling-house, or for the beneficial use and occupation of the house if it is a warehouse, a shop, or other place of business."
