= Phipps v Pears =

United Kingdom court case about land law

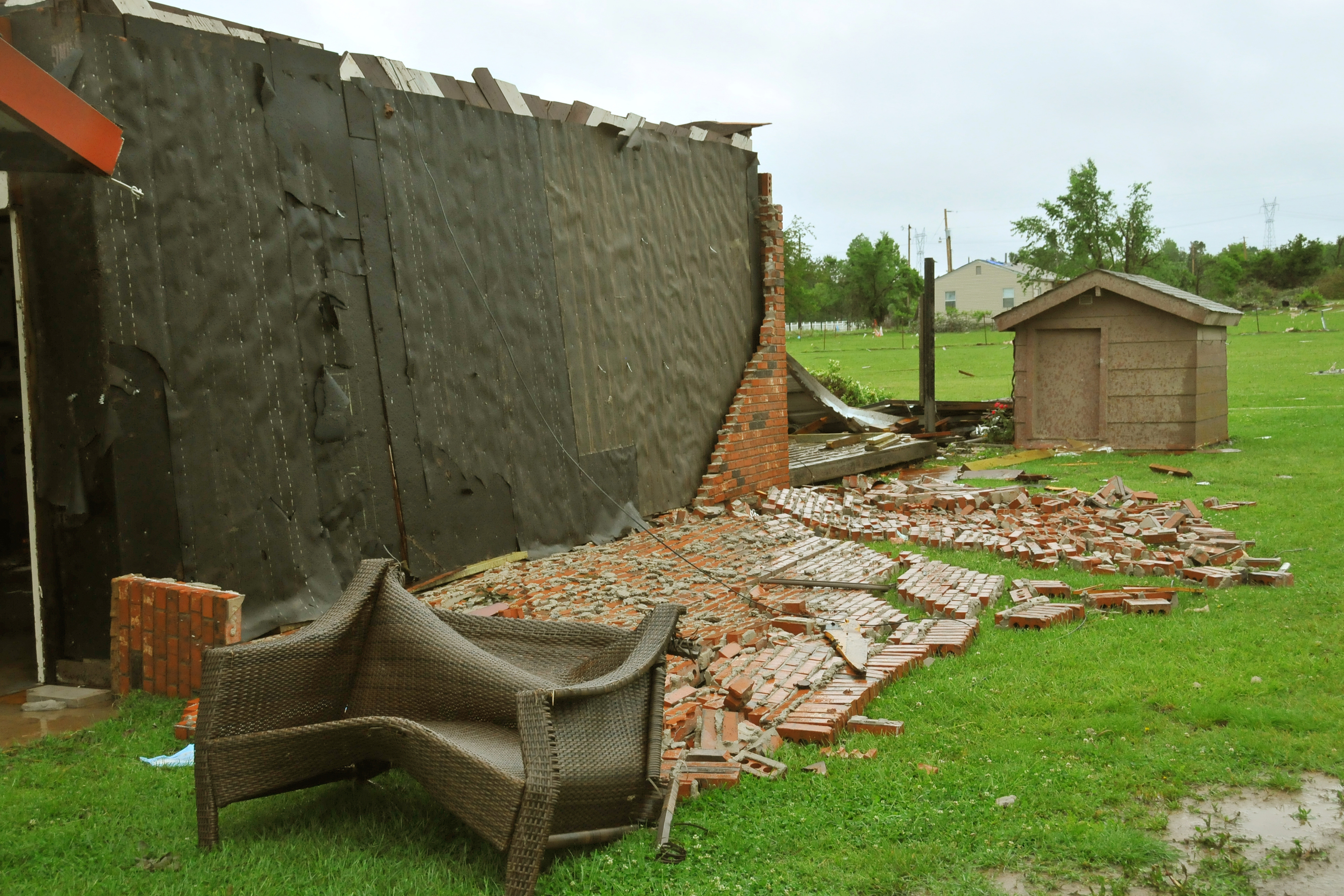
- Walls damaged by weather damage.
- Court: Court of Appeal
- Full case name: George Edward Phipps v Pears and others
- Decided: 10 March 1964
- Citations: [1964] EWCA Civ 3 [1965] 1 QB 76
- Transcript: EWCA Civ 3

Case history
- Prior action: Appellant also lost at first instance.
- Subsequent action: None.

Case opinions
- "Held: But a right to protection from the weather (if it exists) is entirely negative. It is a right to stop your neighbour pulling down his own house. Seeing that it is a negative easement, it must be looked at with caution. Because the law has been very wary of creating any new negative easements. Held: Likewise every man is entitled to cut down his trees if he likes, even if it leaves you without shelter from the wind or shade from the sun, see the decision of the Master of the Rolls in Ireland. There is no such easement known to the law as an easement to be protected from the weather. The only way for an owner to protect himself is by getting a covenant from his neighbour that he will not pull down his house or cut down his trees. Such a covenant would be binding on him in contract: and it would be enforceable on any successor who took with notice of it. But it would not be binding on one who took without notice.
- Decision by: Denning MR
- Concurrence: Pearson LJ; Salmon LJ

Keywords
- Creation of negative easements; rule against creation of new types of easements; non-existence of general right to continued protection against weather

Phipps v Pears [1964] is an English land law case, concerning easements. The case concerns walls other than those governed by the Party Wall Act. Party walls are those which are touch or are shared or agreed to be party walls. The court held the law will not imply or invent a new form of negative easement to prevent a neighbour's wall being pulled down which offers some protection (and no special agreement or covenant is in place).

== Facts ==
The wall of a newly built house, at number 16 Market Street, Warwick, was very close to the adjoining one, number 14, and was not rendered to make it weatherproof nor well-reinforced to make it strong against wind. The house at number 14 was demolished. This left the wall of number 16 exposed. Cracks soon appeared. Number 16's owner claimed damages against his neighbour for repairing the wall. He pled for the court to find a new kind of negative easement (which would, by extension from analogous types of easement) forbid the earlier, neighbour's wall being pulled down.

== Judgment ==
Lord Denning MR held that there could be no new easement. To be recognised under the Law of Property Act 1925 section 62, the right has to be capable of existing as an easement.

The case, so put, raises the question whether there is aright known to the law to be protected - by your neighbour's house - from the weather. Is there an easement of protection?

There are two kinds of easements known to the law: positive easements, such as a right of way, which give the owner of land a right himself to do something on or to his neighbour's lands and negative easements, such as a right of light, which gives him a right to stop his neighbour doing something on his (the neighbour's) own land. The right of support does not fall neatly into either category. It seems in some way to partake of the nature of a positive easement rather than a negative easement. The one building, by its weight, exerts a thrust, not only downwards, but also sideways on to the adjoining building or the adjoining land, and is thus doing something to the neighbour's land, exerting a thrust on it, see Dalton v Angus (1881) 6 A.C. at p.793 by Lord Selborne, Lord Chancellor.

But a right to protection from the weather (if it exists) is entirely negative. It is a right to stop your neighbour pulling down his own house. Seeing that it is a negative easement, it must be looked at with caution. Because the law has been very chary of creating any new negative easements.

Take this simple instance: Suppose you have a fine view from your house. You have enjoyed the view for many years. It adds greatly to the value of your house. But if your neighbour chooses to despoil it, by building up and blocking it, you have no redress. There is no such right known to the law as a right to a prospect or view, see Bland v Moseley (1587) cited by Lord Coke in Aldred's case, 9 Coke's Reports, 536. The only way in which you can keep the view from your house is to get your neighbour to make a covenant with you that he will not build so as to block your view. Such a covenant is binding on him by virtue of the contract. It is also binding in equity on anyone who buys the land from him with notice of the covenant. But it is not binding on a purchaser who has no notice of it, see Leech v Schweder (1874) LR 9 Ch, Ap 475.

Take next this instance from the last century. A man built a windmill. The winds blew freely on the sails for thirty years working the mill. Then his neighbour built a schoolhouse only twenty-five yards away which cut off the winds. It was held that the miller had no remedy for the right to wind and air, coming in an undefined channel, is not a right known to the law, see Webb v Bird (1863) 10 CB, NS, 268, 13 CB, MS, 84. The only way in which the miller could protect himself was by getting his neighbour to enter into a covenant.

The reason underlying these instances is that if such an easement were to be permitted, it would unduly restrict your neighbour in his enjoyment of his own land. It would hamper legitimate development, see Dalton v Angus (1881) 6 App Cas 740 at 824 per Lord Blackburn.... The only way for an owner to protect himself is by getting a covenant from his neighbour that he will not pull down his house or cut down his trees. Such a covenant would be binding on him in contract; and it would be enforceable on any successor who took with notice of it. But it would not be binding on one who took without notice...

It was said that when the owner, Mr Field, conveyed No.16 to Helena Field, the plaintiff's predecessor, there was implied in the conveyance all the general words of Section 62 of the Law of Property Act 1925. The conveyance included all "easements, rights and advantages whatsoever appertaining or reputed to appertain to the land". On the conveyance of No.16, Market Street to the plaintiff's predecessor, there passed to him all these "advantages" appertaining to No.16. One of these advantages, it was said, was the benefit of having the old No.14 there as a protection from the weather. I do not think this argument avails the plaintiff for the simple reason that, in order for Section 62 to apply, the right or advantage must be one which is known to the law, in this sense, that it is capable of being granted at law so as to be binding on all successors in title, even those who take without notice, see Wright v Macadam, 1949, 2 KB, 747. A fine view, or an expanse open to the winds may be an advantage to a house, but it would not pass under section 62. Whereas a right to use a coal shed or to go along a passage would pass under section 62. The reason being that these last are rights known to the law, whereas the others are not. A right to protection from the weather is not a right known to the law. It does not therefore pass under section 62.

== Cases applied ==
- Webb v Bird (1863) (see above summary)

== Cases followed ==
- Unnamed decision of Master of Rolls in Ireland regarding removal of trees.

== See also ==
- English land law
- Party Wall Act
