= Party wall surveyor =

Legal specialist in England and Wales

A Party Wall Surveyor is a person who specialises in resolving disputes arising under the Party Wall etc Act 1996. This legislation is only applicable to England and Wales, which, on 1 July 1997, replaced Part VI of the London Building Acts (Amendment) Act 1939, which was only applicable to the Inner London Boroughs.

== Appointment and duties ==
A surveyor appointed under the provisions of the Act has a duty to the Act and not to the party or parties appointing him/her. There is no client-surveyor relationship in the normal sense, as the surveyor has an 'appointing owner'. A person acting as a 'surveyor' under section 10 of the 1996 Act requires no qualifications as a surveyor (or any other profession) and can accept the appointment so long as he or she is not 'a party to the matter' in dispute.

Owners may choose to appoint someone who has a good working knowledge of the Act. The party wall surveyor's role is to resolve differences between neighbours when building works to a party structure, or within specified distances from a neighbour's property, are proposed. The surveyor (Agreed Surveyor where both parties concur in one person) or surveyors (where each party appoints their own surveyor) will resolve the dispute by making an Award, which is legally binding on both parties.

== Membership organisations ==
About 900 Party Wall Surveyors are members of the Pyramus and Thisbe Club, founded in 1974.

About 900 Party Wall Surveyors are members of the Faculty of Party Wall Surveyors, founded in 1997 when the Government introduced party wall legislation across the whole of England & Wales.

About 200 Party Wall Surveyors are members of the Party Wall Surveyors Association founded in 2015 providing free advice to consumers.

Members of the Royal Institution of Chartered Surveyors also provide advice.
