= Moncrieff v Jamieson =

Moncrieff v Jamieson [2007] UKHL 42 is a Scottish property law case decided by the House of Lords on servitudes (the Scottish equivalent of "easements").

== Facts ==
The appellant (J) appealed against a decision (2005 1 S.C. 281) that a right of vehicular access from a public road included a right to park on the servient tenement such vehicles as were reasonably incidental to the enjoyment of access to the dominant tenement. The respondents (M) owned a property situated between the foot of a steep escarpment and the foreshore. Vehicles could not be driven onto the property. The property once formed part of the lands owned by J and he was the owner of the land between the property and the public road. Since the property had no access to the public road, the rights conveyed by the disposition in 1973 included a right of access from the public road through J's land. The effect of that conveyance was to confer a servitude right of access to the property from the public road for both pedestrian and vehicular traffic; and a right to stop vehicles on the servient tenement in order to turn, load and unload goods from them and set down and pick up passengers was accessory to the right of vehicular access. M claimed that there was also an accessory right to park vehicles on the servient tenement. The sheriff granted declarator that M were entitled to park vehicles on the servient tenement in the exercise of rights accessory to the servitude right of access and pronounced permanent interdict against J. The Court of Session dismissed an appeal. J submitted that it was not possible in the law of Scotland for there to be a servitude of parking; a permanent interdict was unnecessary and its terms were too uncertain to enable J to know what was prohibited by it.

== Judgment ==
The appeal was dismissed.

1. A servitude right to park could be constituted as ancillary to a servitude right of vehicular access if it was necessary for the enjoyment of the servitude of access.
2. The express grant of a right of access had to be construed in the light of the circumstances that existed when it was granted in 1973, but it was not necessary for it to be shown that all the rights that were later claimed as necessary for the comfortable use and enjoyment of the servitude were actually in use at that date. It was sufficient that they might be considered to have been in contemplation at the time of the grant, having regard to what the dominant proprietor might reasonably be expected to do in the exercise of his right to convenient and comfortable use of the property, Ewart v Cochrane (1861) 4 Macq. 117 considered. In the particular and unusual circumstances of the instant case, the rights ancillary to the express grant of a right of access in favour of the dominant tenement included a right to park vehicles on the servient tenement, in so far as that was reasonably incidental to the enjoyment of the dominant tenement.
3. The history of the case justified the granting of interdict and in practice there ought to be no real difficulty in giving effect to the declarator or in enforcement of the interdict.

The House of Lords recognised that easements must always be exercised civiliter (without amounting to exclusive possession over the servient land), but the House of Lords displayed a more sympathetic attitude to easements that substantially exclude the servient owner.

Obiter, the court also recognised the possibility of a servitude right of parking in Scottish law and an easement of parking in English law.

== See also ==
- English land law
