= Kent v Kavanagh =

English land law case

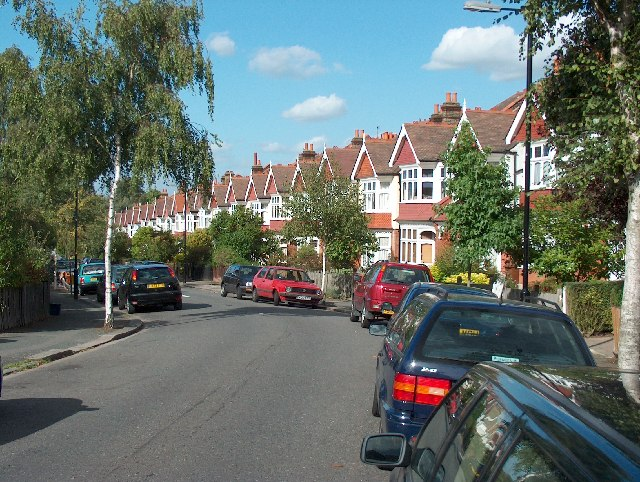
- The typical shared path lay between houses on this street.
- Court: Court of Appeal
- Full case name: (1) John Martin Kent and (2) Philippa Kent v (1) Matthew Kavanagh and (2) Marianne Morgan Kavanagh
- Citations: [2006] EWCA Civ 162 [2006] 2 All ER 765 [2007] Ch 1

Keywords
- Easements

Kent v Kavanagh [2006] EWCA Civ 162 is an English land law case, concerning easements. It concerns physically shared amenities with physically divided ownership as to the land or surface on which they rest.

== Facts ==
Constructed in 1907, numbers 56 and 58 in a semi-detached housing estate were built with a path between them, giving access from a road to the back gardens. The boundary between the two was the mid line of the path. On 14 May 1976 the estate owners sold number 56 to the tenants under the Leasehold Reform Act 1967 section 8 i.e. the lessees (tenants) exercised their rights to leasehold enfranchisement (purchase the freehold underlying their house). The tenants had not required an express right of way be included under LRA 1967, section 10(3)(a). In October 1976 number 58 was also enfranchised. In 2003, the occupants of number 56 sued number 58 for a right of way.

The learned judge at first instance rejected the claim that any right appertained to number 56 under the Law of Property Act 1925, section 62(2) because there was no evidence the path was used for gaining access to the back garden at the time of the conveyance. But he accepted an easement over the path should be implied into the 14 May 1976 conveyance under Wheeldon v Burrows because it was necessary for reasonable enjoyment.

== Judgment ==
Chadwick LJ held that there was no difficulty in implying into each lease the grant and reservation of reciprocal rights to share the pathway.

The alternative type of implied easements, under Wheeldon v Burrows, did not apply where between the land conveyed and that retained, there was common ownership, but not common occupation. There needed to be both. Hence it is inapplicable to standard leasehold enfranchisement.

43. The two propositions which together, comprise the rule (or rules) in Wheeldon v Burrows are confined in their application, to cases in which, by reason of the conveyance (or lease), land formerly in common ownership ceases to be owned by the same person. It is in cases of that nature that, in order to give effect to what must be taken to be the common intention of the grantor and grantee, the conveyance (or lease) will operate as a grant (for the benefit of the land conveyed) of such easements over the land retained by the grantor as are necessary to the reasonable enjoyment of the land conveyed. But, because the principle is founded on the common intention of the parties, the easements necessary to the reasonable enjoyment of the land conveyed are those which reflect (and, following separation of ownership, are needed to give effect to) the use and enjoyment of the land conveyed at the time of the conveyance and while that land and the retained land were in the common ownership of the grantor.

== See also ==
- English land law
- English trusts law
- English property law
