= Studebaker Corporation Branch Office Building =

- U.S. National Register of Historic Places
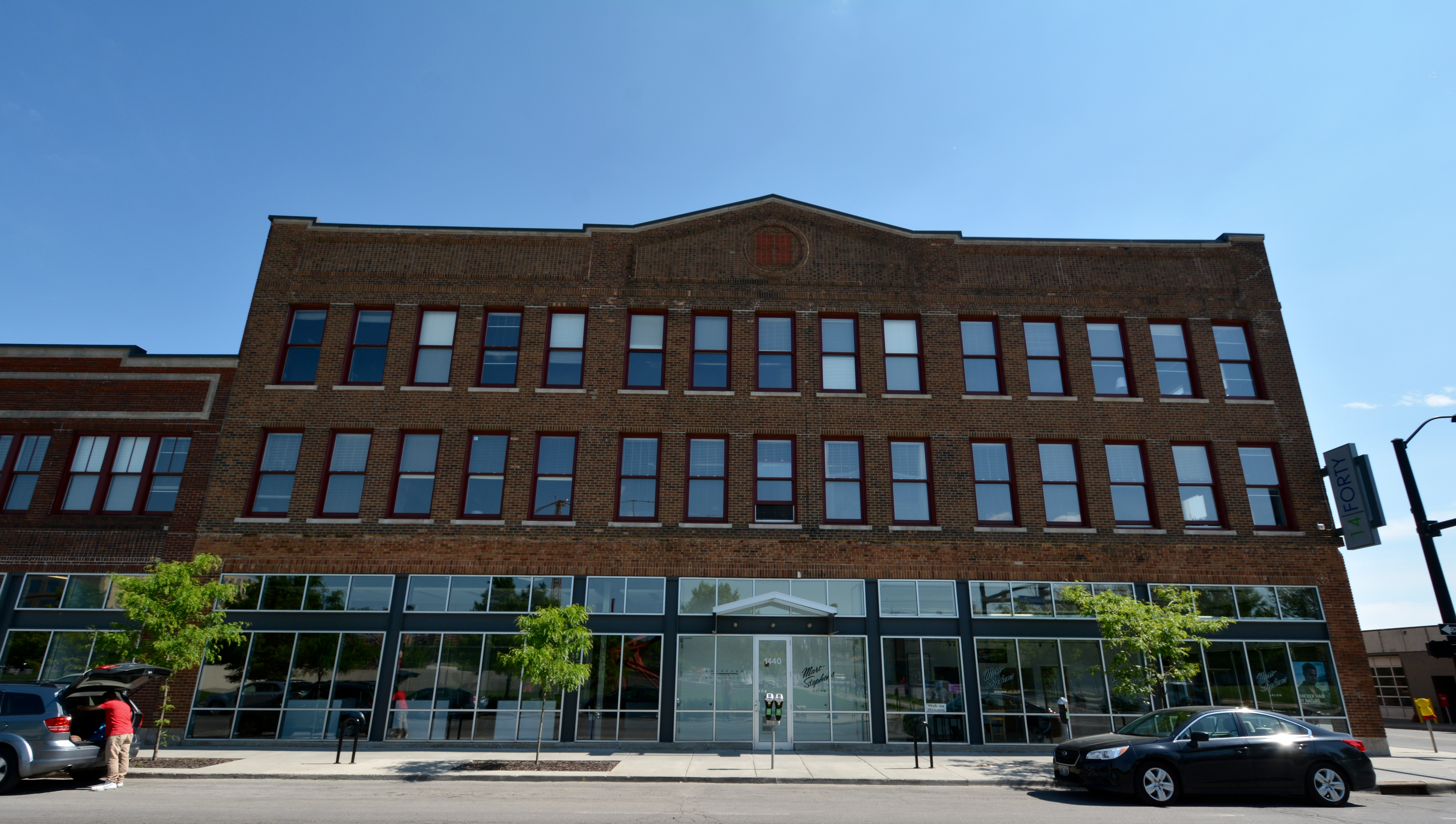

- Location within Iowa Location within the United States
- Location: 1436-42 Locust St. Des Moines, Iowa
- Coordinates: 41°35′02.8″N 93°38′10.7″W
- Area: less than one acre
- Built: 1918, 1922
- Architect: Proudfoot, Bird & Rawson
- Architectural style: Late 19th and Early 20th Century American Movements
- MPS: Architectural Legacy of Proudfoot & Bird in Iowa MPS
- NRHP reference No.: 15000895
- Added to NRHP: December 15, 2015

The Studebaker Corporation Branch Office Building, also known as the Iowa Truck and Tractor Co., Apperson Iowa Motor Car Co., Sears Auto Co., and the Sanders Motor Co., is a historic building located in Des Moines, Iowa, United States. This is actually two adjacent buildings, built four years apart. The building at 1442 Locust Street was completed in 1918 to house a Studebaker dealership, auto repair shop, and a corporate branch office. The addition of the corporate office made this building different from the others on Des Moines' "Auto Row," where it is located. The building was designed by the prominent local architectural firm of Proudfoot, Bird & Rawson, and built for the Hubbell Building Company who leased it out. The first floor was the location for Glass & Patton, the local Studebaker dealer. The second floor was where Studebaker's wholesale business in the state of Iowa was conducted. The third floor was a store room for automobiles. Studebaker's tenure here was short-lived, and by 1919 other auto and truck related businesses started to occupy the building.

The building at 1436 Locust Street was built in 1922 between two existing buildings, which means it only has party walls. It too housed car dealerships in its early years. It was acquired by Sanders Motor Company in 1937 to house their used cars. Sanders already owned and occupied 1442 Locust Street. The two buildings were incorporated in 1948 with the opening of the party wall on the first floor. The building was listed on the National Register of Historic Places in 2015.
