= Profit (real property) =

Right to a land's natural resources

A profit (short for profit-à-prendre in Middle French for "advantage or benefit for the taking"), in the law of real property, is a nonpossessory interest in land similar to the better-known easement, which gives the holder the right to take natural resources such as petroleum, minerals, timber, and wild game from the land of another. Indeed, because of the necessity of allowing access to the land so that resources may be gathered, every profit contains an implied easement for the owner of the profit to enter the other party's land for the purpose of collecting the resources permitted by the profit.

== Creation ==
Like an easement, profits can be created expressly by an agreement between the property owner and the owner of the profit, or by prescription, where the owner of the profit has made "open and notorious" use of the land for a continuous and uninterrupted statutory period.

== Types ==
A profit can be appurtenant (owned by an adjacent landowner, and tied to the use of the adjacent land) or in gross.

Appurtenant. An appurtenant profit may only be used by the owner of the adjacent property. A properly recorded profit will remain even if the ownership of the land upon which the profit exists changes hands.

In Gross. By contrast, a profit in gross can be assigned or otherwise transferred by its owner. Courts will construe a profit as being in gross unless the profit is expressly designated as being appurtenant. Therefore, profits by prescription will virtually always be profits in gross. Like a commercial easement in gross, a profit in gross is completely alienable. Profits can also be exclusive (guaranteeing the owner of the profit that no other person will be given the right to collect the specified resources on the land).

== Termination ==
Termination of a profit can occur by a number of means, including:

- merger - if the owner of the profit acquires the land to which it applies, there is no longer any need for a separate right to take resources off it.
- release - the owner of the profit can execute a contract to surrender the profit to the owner of the land.
- abandonment - the owner of the profit ceases to make use of it for a sufficient length of time to lead a reasonable owner to believe that it will no longer be used.
- misuse - if a profit is used in such a way that it places a burden on the servient estate, then it will be terminated.

== England and Wales ==
=== Creation ===
In English law, as a general rule, profits à prendre may be created in five different ways: express grant, reservation, implied grant, prescription, and by statute. Depending on the type of profit à prendre in question, there may be restrictions as to which methods of creation may be used.

==== Express grant and reservation ====
===== Express grant =====
The owner of an estate in land may expressly grant a profit à prendre over their estate.

===== Reservation =====
Where the owner of an estate in land sells part of their estate, but retains the other part, a profit-à-prendre may be created by reservation. This is actually a re-grant made by the purchaser of the newly created estate in land from which the owner of the original estate in land may benefit. This process is commonly referred to as reservation because the owner of the original estate in land has effectively reserved some of the rights they had previously enjoyed as owner of what is now part of the newly created estate in land.

For example, the owner of Blackacre, a freehold estate, may wish to sell part of their land, but retain a right to fish in the river flowing through that part of the land. The owner of Blackacre may therefore create a new estate over the part of the land they wish to sell, but make its sale conditional on a purchaser granting a profit à prendre to fish in the river from which the owner of Blackacre may benefit.

===== Formalities =====
In order for a profit à prendre created by express grant or reservation to take effect at law, it must be created by deed. In order for a deed to be valid, the formalities set out in section 1 of the Law of Property (Miscellaneous Provisions) Act 1989 must be satisfied. If a deed is not used, or if it is not valid, the profit à prendre may only take effect in equity.

==== Implied grant ====
===== Law of Property Act 1925 =====
Profits à prendre may be impliedly granted under section 62 of the Law of Property Act 1925.

===== Necessity =====
If it can be shown that without a profit à prendre, the dominant tenement will be incapable of enjoyment, an implied grant of such a profit may be found by the courts. In practice, this is unlikely to succeed.

===== Common intention =====
If it can be shown that the parties intended for one to grant a profit à prendre from which other could benefit, but that for some reason a deed to that effect was not executed, an implied grant of such a profit may be found by the courts.

===== Wheeldon v Burrows =====
Unlike easements, it does not appear that profits à prendre can be impliedly granted under the rule in Wheeldon v Burrows. In order for rights to be impliedly granted under this rule they must be, inter alia, "continuous and apparent", which profits are not.

==== Prescription ====
===== Common law prescription =====
For a profit à prendre to be created through prescription at common law, the claimant must show that the profit has been in continuous use since time immemorial, which was defined as 1189 by the Statute of Westminster I, an act of the English Parliament dating back to 1275. Given the difficulties in proving continuous use since 1189, the common law evolved to presume existence before 1189 provided the profit à prendre has been used for a 20 years, although this presumption is rebuttable.

Although it remains available, common law prescription has been largely superseded by the Prescription Act 1832 and the doctrine of lost modern grant.

===== Prescription Act 1832 =====
Section 1 of the Prescription Act 1832 provides that profits à prendre may be created by prescription after a period of lawful uninterrupted use. Where the owner of the servient tenement has not granted permission, the prescription period is 30 years; where the owner of the servient tenement has granted permission, provided any such permission is not in writing, the prescription period is 60 years.

===== Lost modern grant =====
Generally, under doctrine of the lost modern grant, if a claimant shown a profit à prendre has been in use for 20 years, it will be presumed that there was an express grant of such a profit, but that the deed has since been lost. This presumption is not rebuttable. The doctrine of the lost modern grant is an example of a legal fiction.

==== Statute ====
Profits à prendre may be expressly created by statute.

=== Enforcement ===
The beneficiary of a profit à prendre may enforce their rights through action, or abatement.

=== Extinguishment ===
==== Express release ====
Owners of a profit à prendre may expressly release the servient tenement from the burden of the profit à prendre. In order for express release to take effect at law, a deed must be executed by all of the beneficiaries; where a deed is not used, express release may only take effect in equity.

==== Statute ====
Profits à prendre may be extinguished by statute, either expressly or impliedly. Express statutory extinguishment occurs where a statute expressly provides that a profit à prendre is to be extinguished. Implied statutory extinguishment occurs where a statute does not expressly provide that a profit-à-prendre is extinguished, but does contain express provisions inconsistent with a continued existence of a profit à prendre.

==== Unity of seisin ====
Where the freehold estates in both the dominant and servient land come into the ownership of the same person, there will be unity of ownership. Unity of ownership is not sufficient on its own to bring about the extinguishment of a profit à prendre. Where the same person is in occupation of both the dominant land and servient land, there will be unity of possession. Unity of occupation is not sufficient on its own to bring about the extinguishment of a profit à prendre. Where the freehold estates in both the dominant and servient land come into both the ownership and possession of the same person, there is unity of seisin. Where there is unity of seisin, any profits à prendre the dominant tenement enjoys over the servient tenement will be extinguished.

==== Merger ====
Where the servient tenement is a freehold reversion, and the dominant tenement a leasehold, if the owner of the leasehold becomes the owner of the freehold reversion, a profit à prendre over the freehold reversion annexed to the leasehold will become extinguished through merger.

==== Abandonment ====
Profits à prendre cannot be extinguished through mere non-use for a long period of time; there must also be intention on the part of the beneficiary for their rights to be abandoned. Intention may be express or implied.

==== Exhaustion ====
It is possible for the servient tenement to become exhausted of the fructus naturales the beneficiary of a profit may take. If the fructus naturales are not capable of replenishment, the profit à prendre will be extinguished through exhaustion. If the fructus naturales are capable of replenishment, the profit will merely be suspended until such a time that the fructus naturales have replenished.

==== Excessive use ====
Excessive use by a beneficiary is not capable of extinguishing a profit à prendre, but it is capable of causing the beneficiary's rights to exercise it to be suspended until the excessive use ceases.

=== Exclusivity ===
==== Several profits ====
Several profits, also referred to as sole profits, grant the beneficiary (or beneficiaries, provided each person is identifiable from the moment of its creation) an exclusive right to enjoy the benefits over the servient tenement. The extent of the exclusivity is such that the owner of the servient tenement will be prohibited from collecting the specified fructus naturales from their own land, unless the right to do so has been reserved. The owner of the servient tenement will also be unable to grant the same profit to another person.

Where the type of profit à prendre is not specified, it will not usually be presumed by the courts to be a several profit, except in the case of a right to fish, which is presumed to be an exclusive right.

Several profits may be rights of common if over common land. There is no statutory definition for rights of common.

==== Profits in common ====
Profits in common grant a number of persons, including the owner of the servient tenement, the right to enjoy the benefits over the servient tenement.

All profits in common are rights of common.

=== Types ===
==== Profits appurtenant ====
The benefits of profits appurtenant are annexed to a dominant tenement. In order for a profit à prendre to be classified as a profit appurtenant, the four requirements set out by the Court of Appeal in Re Ellenborough Park must be satisfied. One of the requirements set out in Re Ellenborough Park is that the benefit must be to the advantage ("accommodate") the dominant tenement; in the case of profits à prendre, there need be no significant advantage provided in order for this criterion to be satisfied.

Profits appurtenant may not be expressed to be unlimited; a limit on use will either be express, or will be limited by the maximum extent to which the dominant tenement may actually benefit.

The majority of profits à prendre in England and Wales are profits appurtenant.

===== Registration =====
Profits appurtenant created over a registered servient tenement on or after 13 October 2003 (the date on which the relevant provisions of the Land Registration Act 2002 came into force) must be substantively registered with HM Land Registry in order to take effect at law. Unless and until substantive registration is completed, any such profit appurtenant may take effect in equity only.

Profits appurtenant created on or after 13 October 2003 over an unregistered servient tenement need not be substantively registered with HM Land Registry in order to take effect at law.

Where a profit appurtenant is a right of common, it cannot be registered within the land registry system, but will instead fall within the remit of the commons registration system. As of January 2021, the commons registration system is changing, with the Commons Registration Act 1965 is gradually being repealed by the Commons Act 2006. Different areas of England are now subject to different registration systems for rights of common.

==== Profits appendant ====
In feudal England, when a lord of the manor granted an enfeoff (freehold estate) over arable land, a profit appendant was automatically created in favour of the enfeoff. A profit appendant enabled the enfeoffee (the person to whom the enfeoff was granted) to benefit from a right to graze horses and oxen (needed to plough the arable land), and sheep and cows (needed to manure the arable land), on pastures belonging to the manor.

It is thought that profits appendant exist only in the form of commons of pasture, a type of right of common.

===== Restrictions on creation =====
Quia Emptores, an act of the English Parliament dating back to 1290, continues to prevent the creation of new profits appendant.

===== Registration =====
Profits à prendre deemed to be rights of common are incapable of substantive registration with HM Land Registry. Consequently, there are no profits appendant registered within the land registration system.

==== Profits in gross ====
Profits in gross are profits à prendre created for the benefit of a person or persons, not for the benefit of a dominant tenement.

Profits in gross, unlike profits appurtenant, may be expressed to be unlimited.

===== Restrictions on creation =====
The lack of a dominant tenement means profits in gross cannot be created by prescription under the Prescription Act 1832. For the same reason, it is not possible for a profit in gross to be created by necessity.

===== Registration =====
Provided that the servient tenement is a freehold or leasehold with more than seven years remaining, profits in gross created over that registered servient tenement on or after 13 October 2003 must be substantively registered with HM Land Registry in order to take effect at law. Unless and until substantive registration is completed, any such profit in gross may take effect in equity only. A profit in gross under these circumstances may be registered with its own title.

Profits in gross created over a registered servient tenement on or after 13 October 2003, where the servient tenement is a leasehold of seven years or less, must also be substantively registered with HM Land Registry. Such profits, however, cannot be registered with its own title; instead, the burden of the profit will be entered into the charges register (part of the title register) for the servient tenement.

Profits in gross created on or after 13 October 2003 over an unregistered servient tenement need not be substantively registered with HM Land Registry in order to take effect at law. Such a profit may, however, be voluntarily registered, provided it is over a freehold estate or over a leasehold estate with more than seven years remaining.

Where a profit in gross is a right of common, it cannot be registered within the land registry system, but will instead fall within the remit of the commons registration system.

==== Profits pur cause de vicinage ====
Profits pur cause de vicinage (Norman French for “because of vicinity”) is a profit à prendre concerning the grazing of cattle on commons of pasture. Profits pur cause de vicinage arise where two commons of pasture are immediately adjacent and open to each other (i.e., not fenced off from each other), and cattle grazing on one common of pasture have been able to stray onto the other common of pasture.

The Law Commission does not consider profits pur cause de vicinage to be profits proper, given they can only arise where there is a common of pasture, and that there is no grant by the owner of the servient tenement (the owner of the common of pasture). Nevertheless, some sources do consider profits pur cause de vicinage to be rights of common proper.

===== Registration =====
Profits pur cause de vicinage cannot be substantively registered with HM Land Registry. The Commons Commissioners, who were responsible for settling disputes as to the registration of rights of common under the Commons Registration Act 1965, have generally held that profits pur cause de vicinage cannot be registered as rights of common either.

== Ireland ==
Irish law governs profits by Part 8 of the 2009 Land Act.
