= Bass v Gregory =

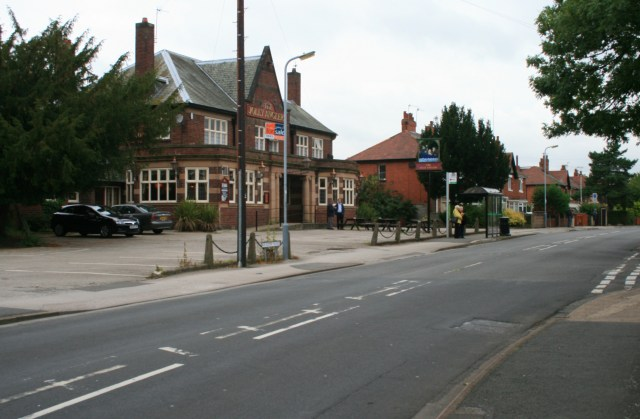
- The Jolly Angler, Nottingham
- Court: Queen's Bench
- Citation: (1890) 25 QBD 481

Court membership
- Judges sitting: Sir Charles Edward Pollock, Baron of the Court of Exchequer and Serjeant-at-Law

Keywords
- Easements, prescription, tort

Bass v Gregory (1890) is an English tort law and English land law case, concerning a ventilation shaft on under or through adjoining land (a "passage of air"). It was deemed an easement by prescription, having been used without long interruptions for forty years. At the time of the case, the law, and the leading judge made a fine technical distinction between prescription by statute and by the common law doctrine of lost modern grant.

== Facts ==
Bass and her tenant owned a pub called The Jolly Anglers in Meadow Road, Beeston, Nottingham. They brought a claim against the owner of neighbouring land (including the cottage in which he lived), Gregory, for blocking a ventilation shaft out of Bass' cellar. Bass brewed beer in the cellar, and the ventilation shaft allowed the fumes to run out of the cellar, through the ground, which connected to Gregory's water well, out of which the air escaped. The shaft had existed for at least 40 years.

== Judgment ==
Pollock B held that Bass had a right to the passage, because the law deemed that if a right had been exercised for a long number of years, there was a legal foundation to the right. He said the following.

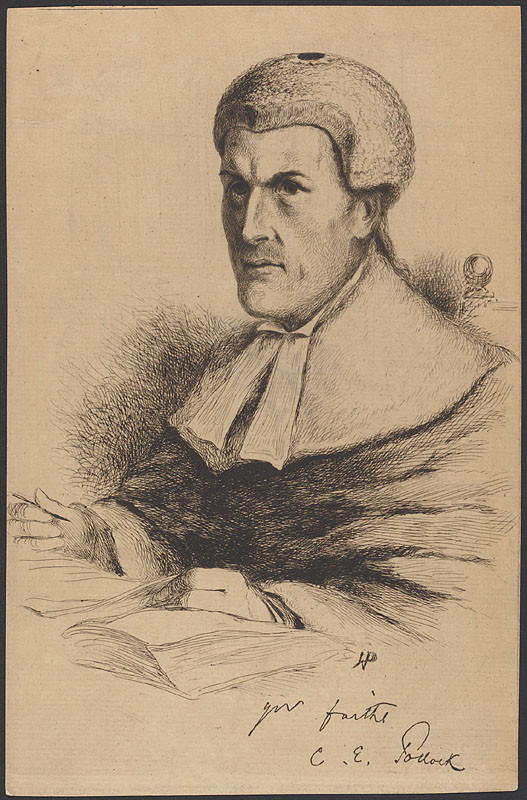
Baron Pollock.

I find, in fact, that for many years — certainly for forty years - there has been a communication between the plaintiffs' cellar and the old well; and by means of that communication the air, some of it impregnated by the brewing operations, has passed from the cellar into the well through the hole or shaft which formed the communication, and upwards through the grating at the top of the well into the open air; so that the well became the ventilating shaft for the cellar. I also find that that state of things was known to the defendant, and to those before him who occupied the yard in which the old well was. Upon the evidence given at the trial it was impossible, to my mind, to suppose that the air, especially when impregnated by the brewing operations, could have passed up the well and out into the open air without it being known to the person, whoever he might be, occupying the yard. Those being my findings in fact, it becomes necessary to consider the law applicable to them. It was argued for the defendant that no such right as that claimed in this case could exist at law, and in support of that proposition the case of Bryant v Lefevre was cited. I do not think that case has any application. There the plaintiff and defendant occupied adjoining premises, and the plaintiff's complaint was that the defendant, in rebuilding his house, carried up the building beyond its former height, and so checked the access of the draught of air to the plaintiff's chimneys. Lord Coleridge CJ, at nisi prius, gave judgment for the plaintiff, but the Court of Appeal, upon the authority of Webb v Bird, held that the right claimed could not exist at law, and that the principle laid down in Chasemore v Richards (a case decided with respect to the right to the flow of water) applied. The view of the Court was that no man could dictate to his neighbour how he should build his house with respect to the general current of air common to all mankind. It was thought that no such right could by the English law be successfully asserted; and it was said that no such right ever had been successfully asserted in this country. There are many reasons, which I need not now go into, for supporting that principle as a sound principle of law; but it does not apply to the present case, because if ever there was a case of the access of air to premises through a strictly defined channel this is that case. In Gale v Abbot and Dent v Auction Mart Co. injunctions were granted to remove and prevent impediments to ventilation. In both cases the right claimed was very much of the same nature as the right claimed here. In both cases it was held, after great consideration, that the right was one known to the English law, which could protect it by injunction. I do not, therefore, find any difficulty in holding, not only that in point of fact the plaintiffs proved their case, but that the case was proved establishing a legal right.

It was said for the defendant that, assuming such a right could exist at law, the Prescription Act did not apply to it, and that upon the evidence a lost grant ought not to be presumed. In Webb v Bird Erle CJ, expressed an opinion that the second section of the Prescription Act only applied to rights of way and of water. If it were necessary for me to decide that point, I should certainly prefer to adopt Lord Selborne's view in Dalton v Angus. But it is not necessary, because the plaintiffs have also claimed to be entitled by lost grant. Now, although a good deal has been said from time to time against the doctrine of lost grant, yet almost all civilized countries have adopted it. That doctrine amounts in substance to this: that if a legal right is proved to have existed and been exercised for a number of years the law ought to presume that it had a legal origin. Perhaps the doctrine has best been stated by Parke, B., in Bright v Walker, who says, at page 217: “For a series of years prior to the passing of this Act (the Prescription Act 1832) judges had been in the habit, for the furtherance of justice and the sake of peace, to leave it to juries to presume a grant from a long exercise of an incorporeal right, adopting the period of twenty years by analogy to the Statute of Limitations. Such presumption did not always proceed on a belief that the thing presumed had actually taken place; but, as is properly said by Mr. Starkie in his treatise on Evidence, a technical efficacy was given to the evidence of possession beyond its simple and natural force and operation.” That rule has been acted upon for very many years, and was recognized both in the Court of Appeal and in the House of Lords in Dalton v Angus. I am of opinion that the Court ought to presume a lost grant here, and I know no case in which the doctrine could be more properly applied, because it is impossible to suppose that the precise history of two adjoining tenements such as these should have been preserved. One must look at the state of things existing for a series of years, and then see what is the fair presumption where a person allows an easement of this kind to grow up to the benefit of his neighbour's land and the detriment of his own. I am of opinion, therefore, that the plaintiffs have properly stated their case, and that they have proved a legal right to the relief which they claim.

== See also ==
- English land law
