= Nonpossessory interest in land =

A nonpossessory interest in land is a term of property law to describe any of a category of rights held by one person to use land that is in the possession of another.

== Creation ==
Such rights can generally be created in one of two ways: either by an express agreement between the party who owns the land and the party who seeks to own the interest, such as by a deed or indenture; or by an order of a court, as an implied agreement.

== Types ==
Under the common law, there are five variations of such rights. These are:

- easements
- profits
- restrictive covenants
- equitable servitudes, and
- licenses.

The Restatement of the Law of Property both clarifies and expands upon the types of nonpossessory interests. For example, in § 28, a reversion is defined as "a nonpossessory interest in land remaining after the creation of one or more estates or interests in fee tail, for life, for years, for a periodic term, or at will."

== See also ==
- Fee simple
- Lease
- Seisin
