= Pyramus and Thisbe Club =

The Pyramus and Thisbe Society was founded (as the Pyramus and Thisbe Club) in 1974 to bring together surveyors and architects with a professional interest in party wall matters, especially related to the Party Wall etc. Act 1996.

The club is named after the Shakespearean characters Pyramus and Thisbe, the two lovers who were separated by a wall in Ovid’s Metamorphoses.

The Club has published a book called The Party Wall Act Explained (ISBN 9780955845406) which is often referred to as The Green Book, and was referred to in the House of Lords during the debate leading up to the Party Wall etc Act in January 1996.
