= Hair v Gillman =

2000 English land law case

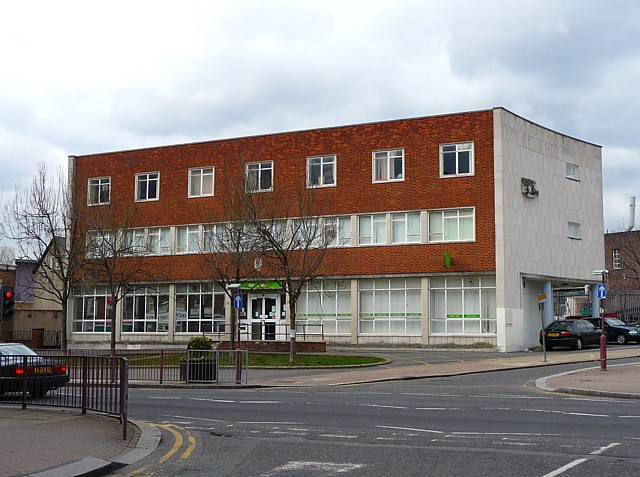
- A building with forecourt. The Court of Appeal determined a building's occupier behind (that had been part of the site) had a continued right to use its customary parking space(s) after entering into its lease which was silent on the matter.
- Court: Court of Appeal
- Decided: 17 February 2000
- Citations: (2000) 80 P.& C.R. 108 [2000] 3 EGLR 74 [2000] 48 E.G. 117

Keywords
- Easements; withdrawal of verbal permission; associated right of way on foot; right to park; interrelated parcels; s62 Law of Property Act

Hair v Gillman (2000) 80 P&CR 108 is an English land law case, concerning creation of easements.

== Facts ==
Ms Gillman had taken a seven-year lease of a school built in the back yard of a three-storey building that had a forecourt by the street. It was leased by a third party. The school's lease (and underlying freehold) had a right of way by the building in front of it, but no express right of way over the forecourt in front of that. The building was leased to accountants for 21 years from 1977, and the freehold was bought by Mr Hair in 1985. Gillman claimed that she had been given permission to park her car in the forecourt, and this crystallised into an easement under Law of Property Act 1925, section 62(1) when acting for the school she entered into the lease. Hair before the action denied Gillman the parking space he had earlier allowed on unstated terms. He sought a declaration Gillman would have no such continuing right related to her school.

== Judgment ==
Judge LJ sitting alone in the High Court held the permission was capable of being an easement, but Law of Property Act 1925, section 62(1) did not apply because here the use was "never intended to be on a permanent basis". Gillman appealed.

Held: that the right, even though precarious, was capable of falling under Law of Property Act 1925, section 62(1): Wright v Macadam [1949] 2 KB 744. The forecourt use was not temporary as it was not to end at a certain date. It was not secure either, and could have been withdrawn at any time, but it was nevertheless protected now.

== See also ==
- English trusts law
- English property law
