= Crow v Wood =

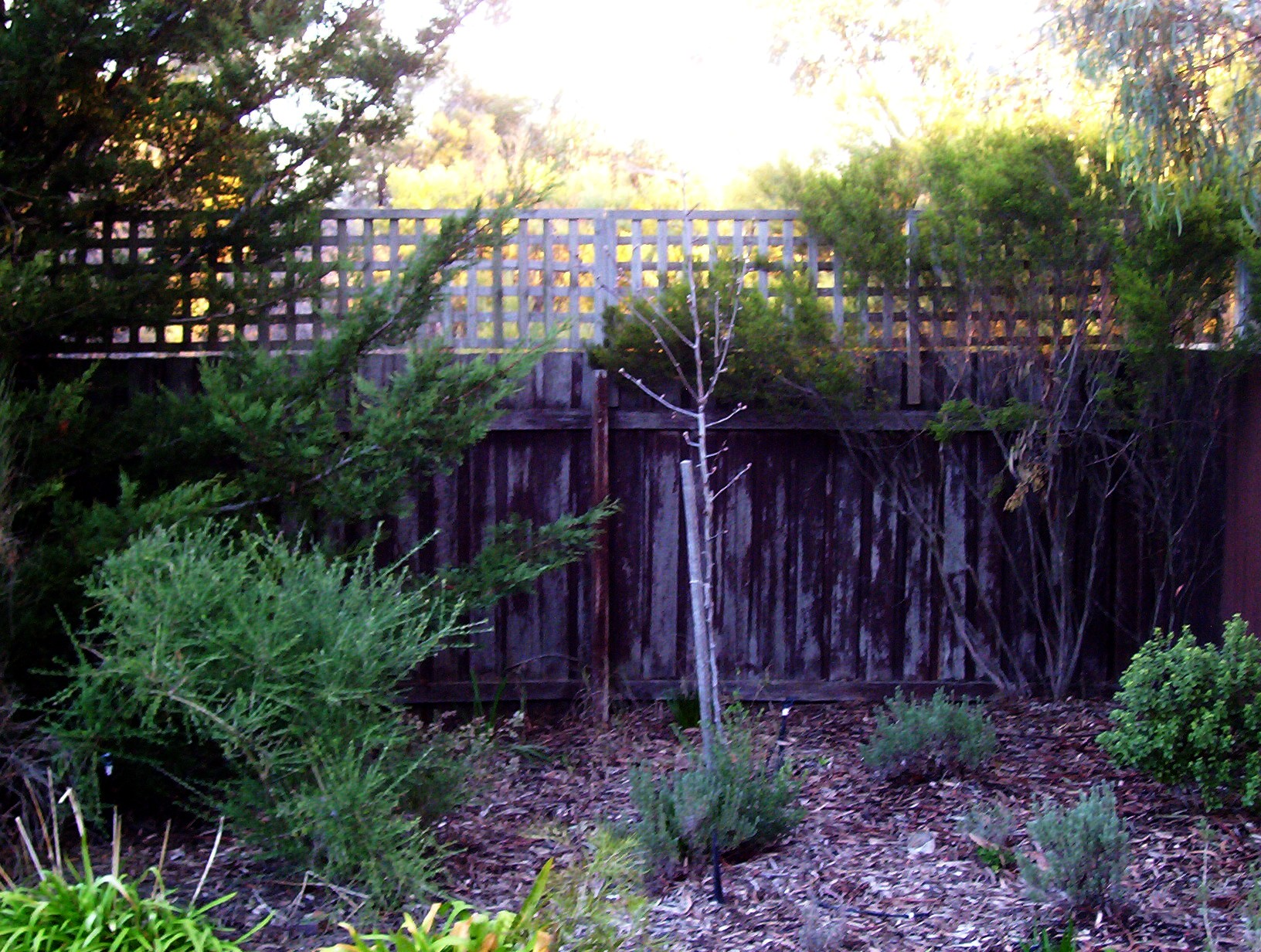
- Boundary fence
- Court: Court of Appeal
- Full case name: Edna Jean Crow v Robin Stuart Wood
- Decided: 9 June 1970
- Citations: [1970] EWCA Civ 5 [1971] 1 QB 77 [1970] 3 WLR 516 (1970) 21 P & CR 929 [1970] 3 All ER 425

Case history
- Prior actions: The appellant, Wood, lost at first instance.

Court membership
- Judges sitting: Denning LJ MR; Edmund-Davies LJ; Megaw LJ

Keywords
- Easements, cattle trespass

Crow v Wood [1970] EWCA Civ 5 is an English land law case, confirming an easement commonly exists for the right to have a fence or wall kept in repair expressed in earlier deeds, which is a right which is capable of being "granted" by law and secondly, as a separate but on the facts, related issue, of the right of common land pasture (common pasture) asserted by continued use (an easement by prescription).

== Facts ==
Mrs. Edna Crow of Stone House Farm sued Mr. Robin Wood of Wether Cote Farm (both located in Hawnby) for cattle/chattel trespass due to his sheep straying onto her land. She lived on a Yorkshire moor, which was once in common ownership where sheep had the right to stray. Some parcels were eventually sold off, but several shepherds such as the defendant Wood maintained their straying flocks. In 1966, the plaintiff Crow ceased to keep up a fence around her land. Wood claimed that under an implied grant under common law and section 62 of the Law of Property Act 1925 she was under a duty to keep up the fences separating her private land from the commons (for the benefit of those with grazing rights).

Judge awarded £205 damages and an injunction, and Mr Wood appealed.

== Judgment ==
Lord Denning MR held that the right to have a fence repaired "lay in grant", and so could pass under Law of Property Act 1925, section 62. Further, the right to have a fence or wall kept in repair is considered by the law "in the nature of an easement". Since the plaintiff was in breach of her duty to fence she could not complain of cattle trespass.

Thus a right to use a coal-shed is such a right. It is in the nature of an easement and passes under section 62. But a right, given by contract to have a road kept in repair, is not such a right. It is a positive covenant which does not run with the land and is not binding on successors: see Austerberry v Oldham Corporation (1885) 29 Ch D 750.

The question is, therefore, whether a right to have a fence or wall kept in repair is a right which is capable of being granted by law. I think it is because it is in the nature of an easement. It is not an easement strictly so called because it involves the servient owner in the expenditure of money. It was described by Gale [ Easements, 11th ed. (1932), p. 432] as a "spurious kind of easement." But it has been treated in practice by the courts as being an easement. Professor Glanville Williams on Liability for Animals (1939), says, at p. 209: "If we put aside these questions of theory and turn to the practice of the courts, there seems to be little doubt that fencing is an easement." In Jones v Price [1965] 2 QB 618, 633, Willmer LJ said: "It is clear that a right to require the owner of adjoining land to keep the boundary fence in repair is a right which the law will recognise as a quasi-easement." Diplock L.J., at p. 639, points out that it is a right of such a nature that it can be acquired by prescription which imports that it lies in grant, for prescription rests on a presumed grant.

It seems to me that it is now sufficiently established - or at any rate, if not established hitherto, we should now declare - that a right to have your neighbour keep up the fences is a right in the nature of an easement which is capable of being granted by law so as to run with the land and to be binding on successors. It is a right which lies in grant and is of such a nature that it can pass under section 62 of the Law of Property Act 1925.

Edmund Davies LJ stated that the duty to fence arises from proof that the land is accustomed to be fenced. This was strongly disapproved in the same court, five years later.

== Followed by ==
- Haddock v Churston Golf Club [2018] EWHC 347 (Ch)

== Obiter dictum of Edmund-Davies ==
This was disapproved in:

- Egerton v Harding [1975] QB 62, CA (England and Wales)

== See also ==
- English land law
- English trusts law
- English property law
