= Equitable servitude =

An equitable servitude is a term used in the law of real property to describe a nonpossessory interest in land that operates much like a covenant running with the land. In England and Wales the term is defunct and in Scotland it has very long been a sub-type of the Scottish legal version of servitudes, which are what English law calls easements. However, covenants and equitable servitudes in most of the jurisdictions across North America are slightly different. The usual distinction is based on the remedy plaintiff seeks and precedent will allow for the scenario in question. Where the terms are unmerged, holders of a covenant seek money damages; holders of equitable servitudes seek injunctions. The term used to exist in England widely before Tulk v Moxhay and as byproduct of the Judicature Acts became one of the fullest mergers of equity and common law in England and Wales so as to agree initially on the term "equitable covenant", then coming to be united in the term covenant save that "equitable" bears a particular meaning in English property rights since at least 1925: it means not fully compliant with registration/written formalities. If lacks legally routine formalities it is not a full legal covenant and therefore more tenuous, often only enforceable personally and against the original covenantor (in personam).

Equitable servitude remains conceptually unaltered from its original core meaning however in many derived jurisdictions today. It describes wherever a party is in a non-criminal way forbidden from certain use (of land) in such a way as for breach to justify prohibitory or mandatory action to be ordered by the court. The term usually applies only to permanent restrictions, others may more commonly branded rules, terms of use, private byelaws or restrictions.

The first example was wherever there was an enclave, the land owner would forever, while it is necessary, enjoy an implied positive servitude over the intervening land. In England and Wales that scenario is almost exclusively expressed in terms of implied easements in modern parlance.

In the United States, negative and affirmative equitable servitudes remain a live legal concept in their own right. It is a covenant that equity will enforce in equity, rather than in the common law, against the successors of the burdened land who have notice of the covenant. If such notice is by constructive knowledge, such as the enquiries an ordinary purchaser ought to have made, then the covenant is known as "implied".

== Creation ==
An equitable servitude must be created by a writing, unless it is a negative equitable servitude that may be implied from a common scheme for the development of a residential subdivision, so long as landowners have notice of the agreement. Implied negative servitudes, however, are not recognized in some states, such as Massachusetts and California.

== Burden ==
A successor of the promisor is bound if the original promise is in writing, the covenanting parties intended the servitude to be enforceable by and against assignees, the successor of the promisor has actual, inquiry (record), or constructive notice of the servitude, and the covenant touches and concerns the land.

== Benefit ==
The benefit of an equitable servitude runs with the land and thus is enforceable by the promisee's successors if the original parties so intended, and the servitude touches and concerns the benefited property.

== Equitable defenses ==
A court will not enforce an equitable servitude under the following circumstances:

- The person seeking enforcement is violating a similar restriction on his own land (unclean hands).
- The holder of the dominant estate acquiesced in violation of the servitude by the holder of the servient estate (acquiescence).
- The holder of the dominant estate acted in such a way that would have a reasonable person to believe that the covenant was abandoned (estoppel).
- The owner of the dominant estate fails to bring suit against the violator within a reasonable time (laches).
- The character of the neighborhood changed sufficiently through development, changes in zoning, or through non-enforcement of the equitable servitude (called the "changed conditions" doctrine).
