= Wong v Beaumont Property Trust Ltd =

- Court: Court of Appeal
- Citation: [1965] 1 QB 173

Keywords
- Easements

Wong v Beaumont Property Trust Ltd [1965] 1 QB 173 is an English land law case, concerning easements.

== Facts ==
Mr Wong leased a basement for his Chinese restaurant, Chopstick, 83 and 84 Queen Street, Exeter. The lease said he should control all smells, comply with health regulations and not cause nuisance to the landlord or other occupiers. The vent was inadequate, a larger flue needed. The landlord objected.

== Judgment ==
Lord Denning MR held that an easement could be implied so Mr Wong could comply with his obligations under the lease. He cited Pwllbach Colliery Co Ltd v Woodman on common intentions and said, ‘That is the principle which underlies all easements of necessity.’

== See also ==
- English land law
- English trusts law
- English property law
