= Copeland v Greenhalf =

- Court: Chancery Division
- Full case name: Copeland v Greenhalf
- Decided: 7 March 1952
- Citation: [1952] Ch 488; [1952] 1 All ER 809; [1952] 1 TLR 786; (1952) 96 SJ 261

Keywords
- Easements; excessive use

Copeland v Greenhalf [1952] Ch 488 is an English property law case establishing that excessive use of another's land cannot be granted by way of an easement. The defendant claimed that he held a prescriptive right to leave an unlimited number of cars on his neighbour's land, by way of such a right having existed for some fifty years previously. The court found that the claim would amount to the defendant effectively becoming a joint user of the plaintiff's land, and this was not something which could be implied as a right.

== Facts ==
The plaintiff, Mrs Copeland, owned an orchard, and an adjoining house. A strip of land, which measured around 150 feet long by 15 to 35 feet wide, provided access to the orchard from the road. The defendant, a wheelwright, owned a house opposite the strip of land. Mrs Copeland brought an action to prevent the defendant from storing vehicles on her strip of land, following her purchase of the land in 1946. Mr Greenhalf responded that he had a prescriptive right to store vehicles on the strip, as it had been used for such purposes for some fifty years prior to the action. It was submitted that the plaintiff and her predecessors had knowledge of this, with a space left for access to the orchard.

== Judgment ==
It was submitted for the defendant that the right to deposit objects on the land of another had been recognised, in the case of Pye v Mumford. Whilst Upjohn J accepted that such a right could form an easement, he noted that the right claimed was wholly uncertain and incapable of enforcement by the courts, due to the variable number of vehicles and their indeterminate tenure on the plaintiff's land. Additionally, as an easement must be for the benefit of the dominant tenement, it was submitted that the use of the plaintiff's land to carry out repairs was merely for the benefit of Mr Greenhalf's business, and did not in any way benefit his own land. The main problem the court found however was the breadth of the right that the defendant was seeking, with Upjohn J stating:

I think that the right claimed goes wholly outside any normal idea of an easement, that is, the right of the owner or the occupier of a dominant tenement over a servient tenement. This claim (to which no closely related authority has been referred to me) really amounts to a claim to a joint user of the land by the defendant.

It was therefore held that, as the right was not one which the courts could recognise as an easement, the injunction to prevent the defendant from storing vehicles on the plaintiff's strip of land should be granted.

== See also ==
- English property law
- Easements in English law
