= Aldred's Case =

Common law case regarding nuisance

Aldred's Case (1610) 9 Co Rep 57b; (1610) 77 ER 816, [1558–1774] All ER Rep 622, is an English land law and tort law case on nuisance. The case can be seen as the birth of the ordinary man having a cause of action in certain types of environmental law against his immediate neighbour. The case confirmed a legal right to abate relatively extreme noise and smell, provided it cannot be justified as being protected by way of an easement have arisen such as from the passing of time (an easement by prescription) or custom on the piece of land in question.

The judge recited the separate law, in an obiter dictum in an old Latin maxim in the English common law, that there is no right to a view.

William Aldred claimed that Thomas Benton had erected and used a pigsty too close to his house, so that the stench made his own house unbearable to live in, including the "stopping of wholesome air".

== Judgment ==
The court ruled that the smell of the sty was enough to deprive Aldred of his property and personal dignity and therefore a violation of his rights and his honour as it was stripped away from him, holding that a man has, "no right to maintain a structure upon his own land, which, by reason of disgusting smells, loud or unusual noises, thick smoke, noxious vapours, the jarring of machinery, or the unwarrantable collection of flies, renders the occupancy of adjoining property dangerous, intolerable, or even uncomfortable to its tenants..."

The court also held the following.

By force of which custom he justified the stopping [blocking] of the said windows; and upon that the plaintiff demurred in law; and it was adjudged by Sir Christopher Wray, Chief Justice, and the whole Court of King's Bench, that the bar was insufficient in law to bar the plaintiff of his actions, for two reasons:

1. When a man has a lawful easement or profit, by prescription from time whereof, etc another [has a] custom, which is also from time whereof, etc [one] cannot take it away, for the one custom is as ancient as the other: as if one has a way over the land of A. to his freehold by prescription from time whereof etc A. cannot allege a prescription or custom to stop the said way.
2. It may be, that before time of memory the owner of the said piece of land has granted to the owner of the said house to have the said windows, without any stopping of them, and so the prescription may have a lawful beginning: and Wray, Chief Justice, then said, that for stopping as well of the wholesome [healthy] air as of light, an action lies, and damages shall be recovered for them, for both are necessary, for it is said, et vescitur aura ætherea; and the said words horrida tenebritate, etc are significant, and imply the benefit of the light.

But he said, that for prospect [a view and similar], which is a matter only of delight, and not of necessity, no action lies for stopping thereof, and yet it is a great commendation of a house if it has a long and large prospect, unde dicitur, laudaturque domus longos qui prospicit agros. But the law does not give an action for such things of delight.

== See also ==
- Edward Coke
- Wheeler v JJ Saunders Ltd
