= Right to light =

Form of easement in English law

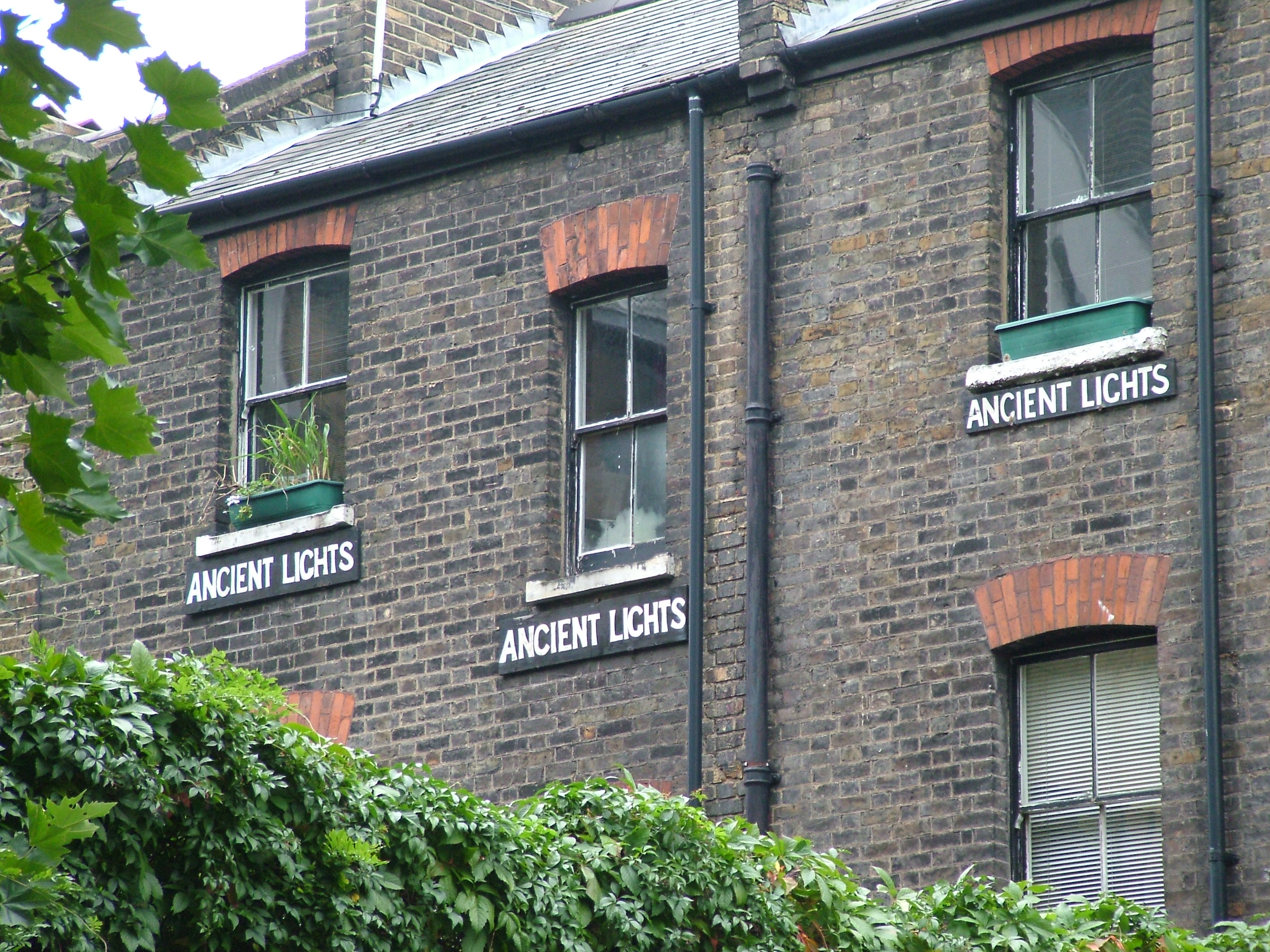
Ancient Lights signs in Clerkenwell, London, England

Right to light is a form of easement in English law that gives a long-standing owner of a building with windows a right to maintain an adequate level of illumination. The right was traditionally known as the doctrine of "ancient lights". A right to light can also be granted expressly by deed, or granted implicitly, for example under the rule in Wheeldon v. Burrows (1879).

In England, the rights to ancient lights are most usually acquired under the Prescription Act 1832.

In American common law the doctrine died out during the 19th century and is generally no longer recognized. Japanese law provides for a comparable concept known as nisshōken (日照権, lit. 'right to sunshine').

== Rights ==
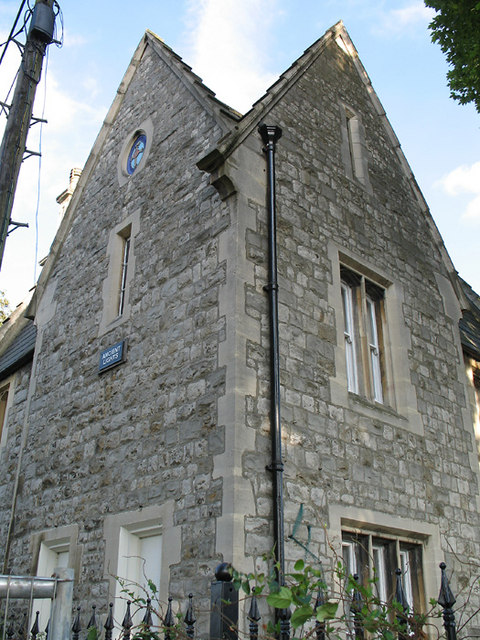
Gatehouse in St Pancras and Islington Cemetery, with "Ancient Lights" plaque visible at left

In effect, the owner of a building with windows that have received natural daylight for 20 years or more is entitled to forbid any construction or other obstruction on adjacent land that would block the light so as to deprive them of adequate illumination through those windows. The owner may build more or larger windows but cannot enlarge their new windows before the new period of 20 years has expired.

Once a right to light exists, the owner of the right is entitled to "sufficient light according to the ordinary notions of mankind": Colls v. Home & Colonial Stores Ltd (1904). Courts rely on expert witnesses to define this term. Since the 1920s, experts have used a method proposed by Percy Waldram to assist them with this. Waldram suggested that ordinary people require one foot-candle of illuminance (approximately ten lux) for reading and other work involving visual discrimination. This equates to a sky factor (similar to the daylight factor) of 0.2%. Today, Waldram's methods are increasingly subject to criticism, and the future of expert evidence in rights to light cases has been the subject of much debate within the surveying profession.

After the Second World War, owners of buildings could gain new rights by registering properties that had been destroyed by bombing, and the period was temporarily increased to 27 years.

In the centre of London, near Chinatown and Covent Garden, particularly in back alleyways, signs saying "Ancient Lights" can be seen marking individual windows. In the early 1930s, the design and construction of BBC's headquarters, Broadcasting House, was affected by local residents declaring their right to ancient lights. It resulted in a unique asymmetrical sloped design that allowed sunlight to pass over the building to the residential quarters eastwards, long since demolished and now home to the new Egton Wing.

Another factor considered with regard to Ancient Lights refers to the building's surroundings rather than its residents. The convention basically is that if an old building which is marked with 'Ancient Lights' is demolished, then the new building which replaces it cannot be taller than the original building.

Owners with rights can give them up in return for financial payment, or courts may award compensation for lost rights instead of stopping adjacent development. Case law from 2010, HKRUK II v Heaney, relating to a commercial development in the centre of Leeds, greatly changed the perceptions of risk to developers associated with right-to-light, particularly in the context of commercial schemes. This case upheld an injunction against a commercial property development, partly because compensation was not an adequate remedy.

One consequence of this is that many developers now look to work with local authorities to try to use section 237 of the Town and Country Planning Act 1990 as a way of potentially avoiding injunctions against schemes that have overriding social or economic advantages to an area.

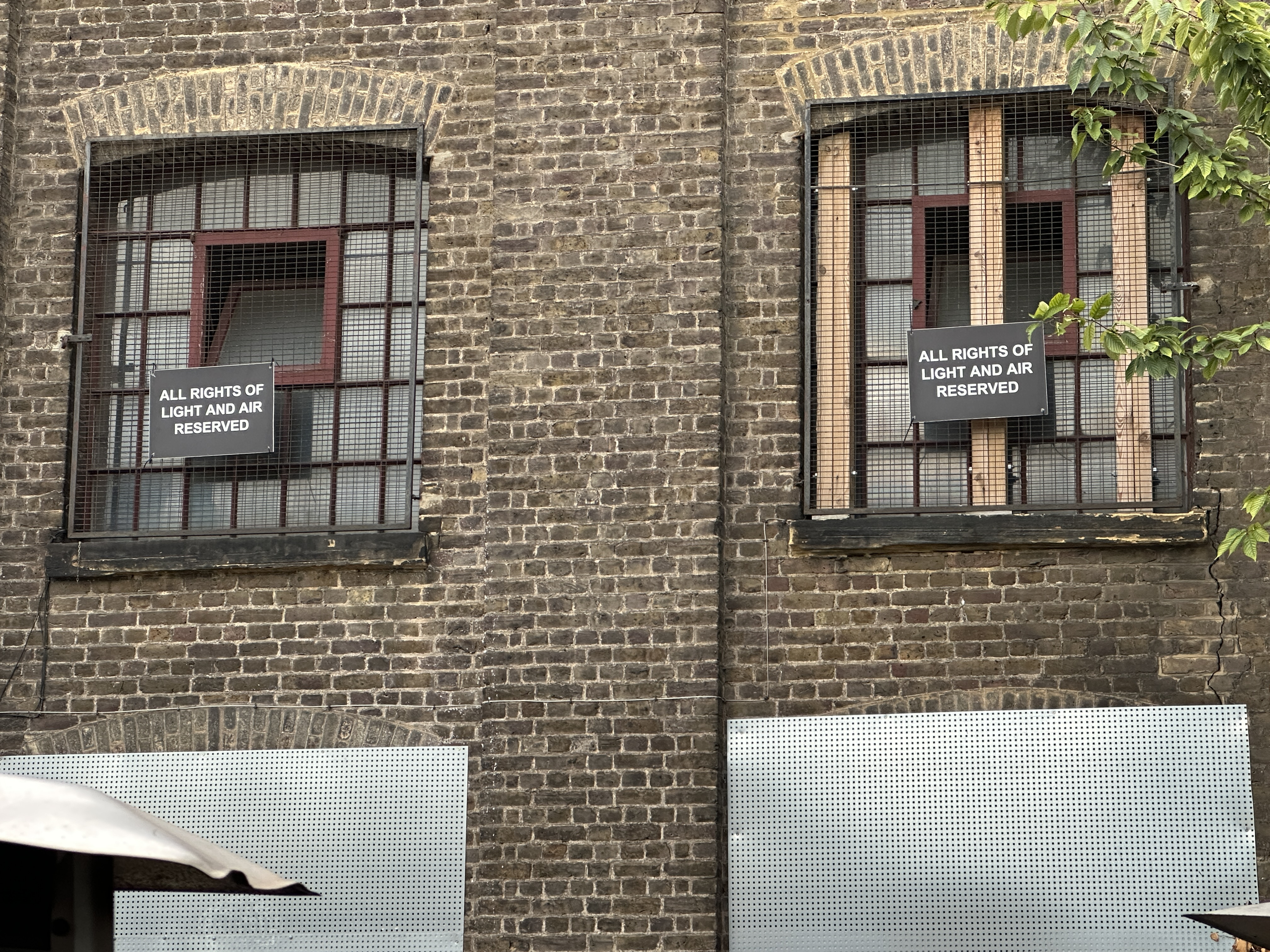
Modern signs in Southwark noting that "all rights of light and air reserved"

The Law Commission of England and Wales undertook a review of the law and practice of rights to light and reported to Parliament in 2014 with several recommendations and a draft Bill including: a statutory notice procedure which would allow landowners to require their neighbours to tell them within a specified time if they intend to seek an injunction to protect their right to light, or to lose the potential for that remedy to be granted; a statutory test to clarify when courts may order damages to be paid rather than halting development or ordering demolition; an updated version of the procedure that allows landowners to prevent their neighbours from acquiring rights to light by prescription; amendment of the law governing where an unused right to light is treated as abandoned; and a power for a tribunal to discharge or modify obsolete or unused rights to light. The Commission did not recommend that prescription should be abolished as a means of acquiring rights to light.

=== United States ===
Under United States tort law, in Fontainebleau Hotel Corp. v. Forty-Five Twenty-Five, Inc. (1959) the Florida District Courts of Appeal stated that the "ancient lights" doctrine had been unanimously repudiated in the United States.

In 1984, voters in San Francisco passed Proposition K, which bans construction of any building over 40 feet (12.2 m) high that casts a shadow on a public park, unless the Planning Commission decides the shadow is insignificant. Massachusetts has similar laws against the casting of shadows on Boston Common, the Public Garden, and other important public open spaces.

In 2016, the Eneref Institute in Washington, DC launched the Right To Daylight campaign to promote the idea that daylight is a natural right.

== See also ==
- Daylighting
- Protected view
- Air rights
- Spite fence
- Spite house
