= Hill v Tupper =

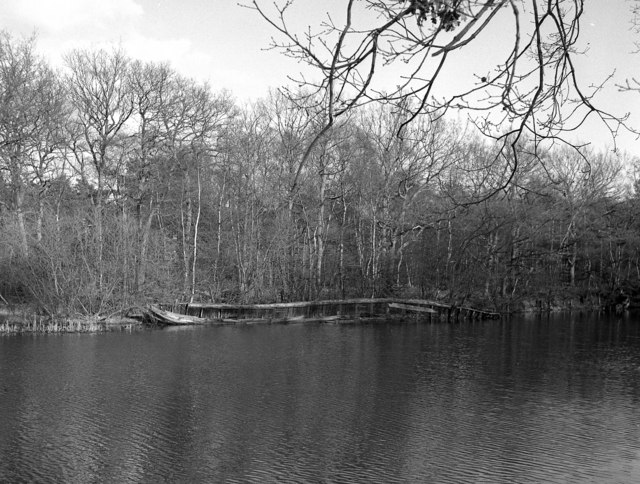
- Remains of a large old tour boat on the Basingstoke Canal
- Court: Court of Exchequer Chamber (precursor to the Court of Appeal)
- Decided: 1 May 1863
- Citations: (1863) 2 H & C 121; 159 ER 51
- Transcript: bailii.org

Case history
- Prior actions: Trial, before Bramwell, B and jury who awarded one farthing damages (1/960 of £1)

Court membership
- Judges sitting: Pollock CB; Martin B Bramwell B

Case opinions
- Decision by: Pollock CB
- Concurrence: Martin B Bramwell B

Keywords
- Easements; right for boating business agreed to be exclusive; whether an exclusive right of navigation enforceable against third parties (easement); competition law; exclusivity agreements

Hill v Tupper (1863) is an English land law case which did not find an easement in a commercial agreement, in this case, related to boat hire. Here, the agreed "exclusive" right was held not to be benefitting the land itself, but just for the business. It could not therefore be enforced directly against third parties competing.

== Facts ==
The Basingstoke Canal Co gave Hill an exclusive contractual licence in his lease of Aldershot Wharf, Cottage and Boathouse to hire boats out. Hill did so regularly. Mr Tupper also occasionally allowed customers to use his boats by his Aldershot Inn to bathe or fish in the canal. Hill wished to stop Tupper from doing so. He sued Tupper, arguing that his lease gave him an exclusive easement and so a direct right to enforce it against third parties (rather than mere licence).

== Judgment ==
Pollock CB held that the contract did not create any legal property right, and so there was no duty on Mr Tupper. If Hill wanted to stop Tupper, he would have to force the Canal Company to assert its property right against Tupper.

An easement would not be recognised. The benefit of an easement must be for the land. Here, the right to exclusive use of the canal was not for benefitting the land itself, but just for the business.

A new species of incorporeal hereditament cannot be created at the will and pleasure of the owner of property...

Bramwell and Martin BB concurred.

== See also ==
- English trusts law
- English property law
