= Party Wall etc. Act 1996 =

Act of the Parliament of the United Kingdom

Party Wall etc. Act 1996 (Note: Section 22(4).)
- Act of Parliament
- Parliament of the United Kingdom
- Long title: An Act to make provision in respect of party walls, and excavation and construction in proximity to certain buildings or structures; and for connected purposes.
- Citation: 1996 c. 40
- Territorial extent: England and Wales (Note: Section 22(4).)

Dates
- Royal assent: 18 July 1996
- Commencement: 1 July 1997 (Note: Section 22(2)–(3). The Party Wall etc. Act 1996 (Commencement) Order 1997 (SI 1997/670).)
Other legislation
Amended by	Party Wall etc. Act 1996 (Electronic Communications) Order 2016

Status: Amended

Text of statute as originally enacted

Text of the Party Wall etc. Act 1996 as in force today (including any amendments) within the United Kingdom, from legislation.gov.uk.

The Party Wall etc. Act 1996 (c. 40) is an act of the Parliament of the United Kingdom relating to party walls.

== Background ==
Before the act was passed, previous legislation had focused on the London area. The lineage of the 1996 act can ultimately be traced back to 1666, when The Great Fire of London gave rise to a radical re-think of party wall construction to restrict the spread of fire between adjacent properties in the future. Until the introduction of the act, there was no set procedure in England and Wales for dealing with such a frequent occurrence, and this often led to expensive litigation to resolve quite straightforward matters. In Inner London however, Part VI of the London Building Acts (Amendment) Act 1939 set out a well tried and tested mechanism for resolving disputes, having evolved over numerous previous enactments of that legislation since the mid nineteenth century. The Party Wall etc. Act 1996 is essentially a re-working of the 1939 act, albeit with certain modifications to improve some anomalies in the Part VI procedure and general updating of the text.

== Provisions ==
The act defines a party wall as a wall standing astride the boundary of land belonging to multiple different owners or is used to separate their properties.

The act introduced a procedure for resolving disputes between owners of neighbouring properties, arising as a result of one owner's intention to carry out works which would affect the party wall, involve the construction of a party wall or boundary wall at or adjacent to the line of junction between the two properties or excavation within certain distances of a neighbour's structure and to a lower depth than its foundations. A homeowner intending to build an extension or conversion or dig a hole that affects an existing party wall must notify their neighbour.

The resolution of a party wall dispute is known as an "award" and this may determine:

- the right to execute any work;
- the time and manner of executing any work; and
- any other matter arising out of or incidental to the dispute including the costs of making the award.

== See also ==
- Party wall surveyor
- Pyramus and Thisbe Club
