= Prescription Act 1832 =

Act of the Parliament of the United Kingdom on easements

Prescription Act 1832 (Note: The citation of this act by this short title was authorised by section 1 of, and the first schedule to, the Short Titles Act 1896. Due to the repeal of those provisions it is now authorised by section 19(2) of the Interpretation Act 1978.)
- Act of Parliament
- Parliament of the United Kingdom
- Long title: An Act for shortening the time of prescription in certain cases.
- Citation: 2 & 3 Will. 4. c. 71
- Territorial extent: England and Wales; Ireland; (Note: Section 9.)

Dates
- Royal assent: 1 August 1832
- Commencement: 2 November 1832 (Note: Section 10. The next first day of Michaelmas term.)
Other legislation
Amended by	Statute Law Revision Act 1874; Statute Law Revision Act 1890; Rights of Light Act 1959; Commons Registration Act 1965; Cross-Border Mediation (EU Directive) (EU Exit) Regulations 2019

Status: Amended

Text of statute as originally enacted

Revised text of statute as amended

Text of the Prescription Act 1832 as in force today (including any amendments) within the United Kingdom, from legislation.gov.uk.

The Prescription Act 1832 (2 & 3 Will. 4. c. 71) is an act of the Parliament of the United Kingdom concerning English land law, and particularly the method for acquiring an easement. It was passed on 1 August 1832.

== Background ==
Common law prescription assumed continuous prescriptive rights from 1189 when the legal regime officially began, all time before which having been designated as time immemorial. The Prescription Act 1832 was written hastily as a response to a criticism by Jeremy Bentham, who proposed the complete elimination of common law. It practically supersedes common law prescription but does not actually invalidate it.

== Provisions ==
- s 1 (not officially numbered), claims to right of common and other profits-à-prendre not to be defeated after thirty years enjoyment by merely showing the commencement; after sixty years enjoyment the right to be absolute, unless had by consent or agreement.

No claim which may be lawfully made at the common law, by custom, prescription, or grant, to any right of common or other profit or benefit to be taken and enjoyed from or upon any land of our sovereign lord the King, or any land being parcel of the duchy of Lancaster or of the duchy of Cornwall, or of any ecclesiastical or lay person, or body corporate, except such matters and things as are herein specially provided for, and except tithes, rent, and services, shall, where such right, profit, or benefit shall have been actually taken and enjoyed by any person claiming right thereto without interruption for the full period of thirty years, be defeated or destroyed by showing only that such right, profit, or benefit was first taken or enjoyed at any time prior to such period of thirty years, but nevertheless such claim may be defeated in any other way by which the same is now liable to be defeated; and when such right, profit, or benefit shall have been so taken and enjoyed as aforesaid for the full period of sixty years, the right thereto shall be deemed absolute and indefeasible, unless it shall appear that the same was taken and enjoyed by some consent or agreement expressly made or given for that purpose by deed or writing.

- s 2, In claims of right of way or other easement the periods to be twenty years and forty years.

No claim which may be lawfully made at the common law, by custom, prescription, or grant, to any way or other easement, or to any watercourse, or the use of any water, to be enjoyed or derived upon, over, or from any land or water of our said lord the King, or being parcel of the duchy of Lancaster or of the duchy of Cornwall, or being the property of any ecclesiastical or lay person, or body corporate, when such way or other matter as herein last before mentioned shall have been actually enjoyed by any person claiming right thereto without interruption for the full period of twenty years, shall be defeated or destroyed by showing only that such way or other matter was first enjoyed at any time prior to such period of twenty years, but nevertheless such claim may be defeated in any other way by which the same is now liable to be defeated; and where such way or other matter as herein last before mentioned shall have been so enjoyed as aforesaid for the full period of forty years, the right thereto shall be deemed absolute and indefeasible, unless it shall appear that the same was enjoyed by some consent or agreement expressly given or made for that purpose by deed or writing.

- s 3, Claim to the use of light enjoyed for 20 years.

When the access and use of light to and for any dwelling house, workshop, or other building shall have been actually enjoyed therewith for the full period of twenty years without interruption, the right thereto shall be deemed absolute and indefeasible, any local usage or custom to the contrary notwithstanding, unless it shall appear that the same was enjoyed by some consent or agreement expressly made or given for that purpose by deed or writing.

- s 4, Before mentioned periods to be deemed those next before suits.

Each of the respective periods of years herein-before mentioned shall be deemed and taken to be the period next before some suit or action wherein the claim or matter to which such period may relate shall have been or shall be brought into question and that no act or other matter shall be deemed to be an interruption, within the meaning of this statute, unless the same shall have been or shall be submitted to or acquiesced in for one year after the party interrupted shall have had or shall have notice thereof, and of the person making or authorizing the same to be made.

- s 5, In actions on the case, the claimant may allege his right generally, as at present. In pleas to trespass and certain other pleadings, the period mentioned in this Act may be alleged. Exceptions, &c. to be replied to specially.

In all actions upon the case and other pleadings, wherein the party claiming may now by law allege his right generally, without averring the existence of such right from time immemorial, such general allegation shall still be deemed sufficient, and if the same shall be denied, all and every the matters in this Act mentioned and provided, which shall be applicable to the case, shall be admissible in evidence to sustain or rebut such allegation; and that in all pleadings to actions of trespass, and in all other pleadings wherein before the passing of this Act it would have been necessary to allege the right to have existed from time immemorial, it shall be sufficient to allege the enjoyment thereof as of right by the occupiers of the tenement in respect whereof the same is claimed for and during such of the periods mentioned in this Act as may be applicable to the case, and without claiming in the name or right of the owner of the fee, as is now usually done; and if the other party shall intend to rely on any proviso, exception, incapacity, disability, contract, agreement, or other matter herein-before mentioned, or on any cause or matter of fact or of law not inconsistent with the simple fact of enjoyment, the same shall be specially alleged and set forth in answer to the allegation of the party claiming, and shall not be received in evidence on any general traverse or denial of such allegation.

- s 6, Presumption to be allowed in claims here provided for.

In the several cases mentioned in and provided for by this Act, no presumption shall be allowed or made in favour or support of any claim, upon proof of the exercise or enjoyment of the right or matter claimed for any less period of time or number of years than for such period or number mentioned in this Act as may be applicable to the case and to the nature of the claim.

- s 7, Proviso for infants, &c.

Provided also, that the time during which any person otherwise capable of resisting any claim to any of the matters before mentioned shall have been or shall be an infant, idiot, non compos mentis, feme covert, or tenant for life, or during which any action or suit shall have been pending, and which shall have been diligently prosecuted, until abated by the death of any party or parties thereto, shall be excluded in the computation of the periods herein-before mentioned, except only in cases where the right or claim is hereby declared to be absolute and indefeasible.

- s 8, What time to be excluded in computing the term of forty years appointed by this Act.

Provided always, that when any land or water upon, over, or from which any such way or other convenient watercourse or use of water shall have been or shall be enjoyed or derived hath been or shall be held under or by virtue of any term of life, or any term of years exceeding three years from the granting thereof, the time of the enjoyment of any such way or other matter as herein last before mentioned, during the continuance of such term, shall be excluded in the computation of the said period of forty years, in case the claim shall within three years next after the end or sooner determination of such term be resisted by any person entitled to any reversion expectant on the determination thereof.

- s 9, Not to extend to Scotland or Ireland (limitation).

And be it further enacted, that this Act shall not extend to Scotland or Ireland.

== Status outside the United Kingdom ==
=== New Zealand ===
In New Zealand, the Imperial Laws Application Act 1988, an Act of the New Zealand Parliament, provided that the Prescription Act 1832 formed part of the law of New Zealand. On 1 January 2008, the Prescription Act 1832 was repealed by the Property Law Act 2007 and ceased to have effect in New Zealand.

=== Western Australia ===
On 11 April 1836, the Imperial Acts Adopting Act 1836, an Act of the Parliament of Western Australia, transposed the Prescription Act 1832 into the law of Western Australia. As of January 2021, the Prescription Act 1832 remains in force in Western Australia.

== Criticism and proposed reform ==
The Law Commission have described the Prescription Act as "one of the worst drafted Acts on the Statute Book" and called for it to be repealed and replaced.

== See also ==
- English land law
- English property law
