= Party wall =

Wall shared by two adjoining properties

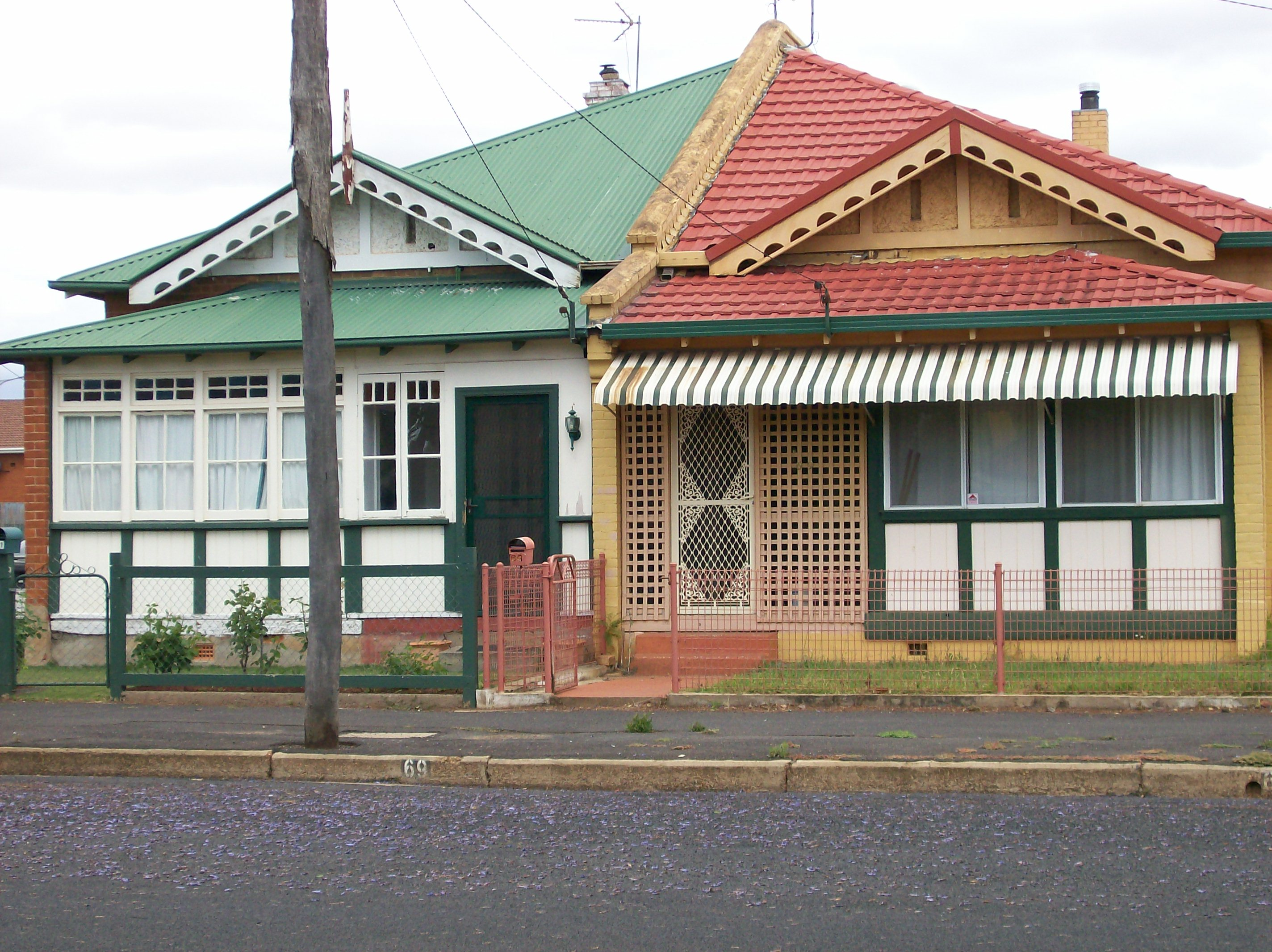
Semi-detached houses typically share a central party wall, which separates the adjoining dwellings.

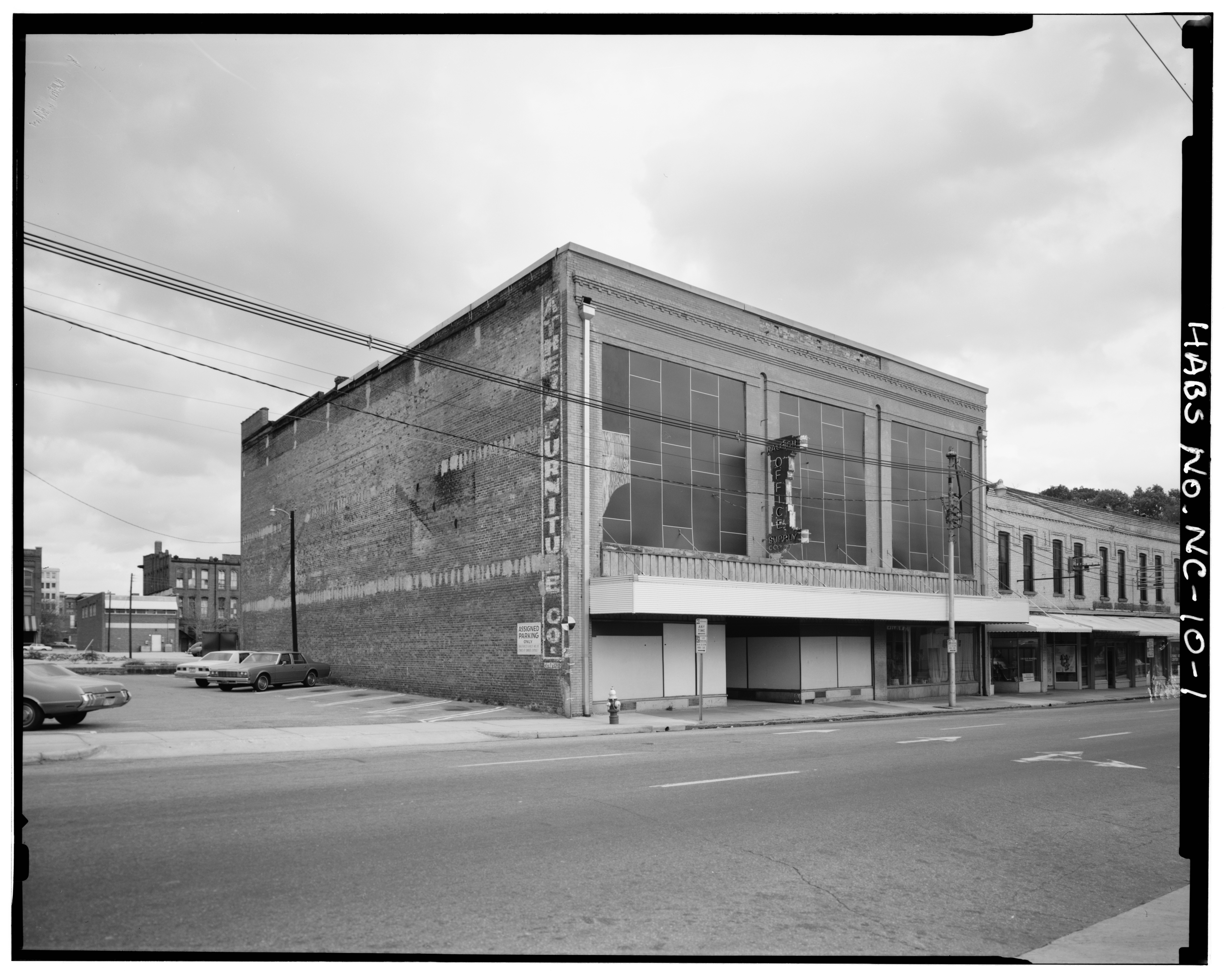
View from southwest, East Martin Street entrance and west party wall – Barber-Towler Building (Commercial Building), 123 East Martin Street, Raleigh, Wake County, North Carolina

A party wall (occasionally parti-wall or parting wall, also known as a shared wall, common wall or demising wall) is a wall shared by two adjoining properties. Typically, the builder lays the wall along a property line dividing two terraced houses, so that one half of the wall's thickness lies on each side. This type of wall is usually structural. Party walls can also be formed by two abutting walls built at different times. The term can also be used to describe a division between separate units within a multi-unit apartment complex. Very often in this case the wall is non-structural but designed to meet established criteria for sound or fire protection, i.e. a firewall.

== England and Wales ==
While party walls are effectively in common ownership of two or more immediately adjacent owners, there are various possibilities for legal ownership: The wall may belong to both tenants (in common), to one tenant or the other, or partly to one, partly to the other. In cases where the ownership is not shared, both parties have use of the wall, if not ownership. Other party structures can exist, such as floors dividing flats or apartments.

In English law the party wall does not confirm a boundary at its median point and there are instances where the legal boundary between adjoining lands actually comes at one face or the other of a wall or part of it, and sometimes at some odd measurement within the thickness of the wall. The legal position is, however, clear insofar as a party using or benefiting from a party wall or structure abutting, on or in its land has rights to use the wall and for it to be retained should the other side no longer wish it to be there. For this reason, expert surveyors are used in the main to issue notices, deal with the response from someone receiving a notice and settling any dispute by an Award. Details can be obtained from the Royal Institution of Chartered Surveyors.

Originating in London as early as the 11th century, requirements for terraced houses to have a dividing wall substantially capable of acting as a fire break have been applied in some form or other. Evidently, this was not enough to prevent the several great fires of London, and the most famous of which being the Great Fire of 1666.

In England and Wales, the Party Wall etc. Act 1996 confers rights on those whose property adjoins a party wall or other 'party structure' irrespective of ownership of the wall or structure.

== United States ==
In the United States, the term may refer to a fire wall that separates and is used in common by two adjoining buildings (condominium, row house), or the wall between two adjacent commercial buildings that were built using common walls, or walls built onto existing walls. Rights and obligations are governed by state statutes and common law.

The wall starts at the foundation and continues up to a parapet, separating two structurally independent buildings.

== See also ==
- Right to light
- Architectural acoustics
- Property law
- Semi-detached housing
- Condominium
- Partition wall
