= Wheeldon v Burrows =

1879 English land law case

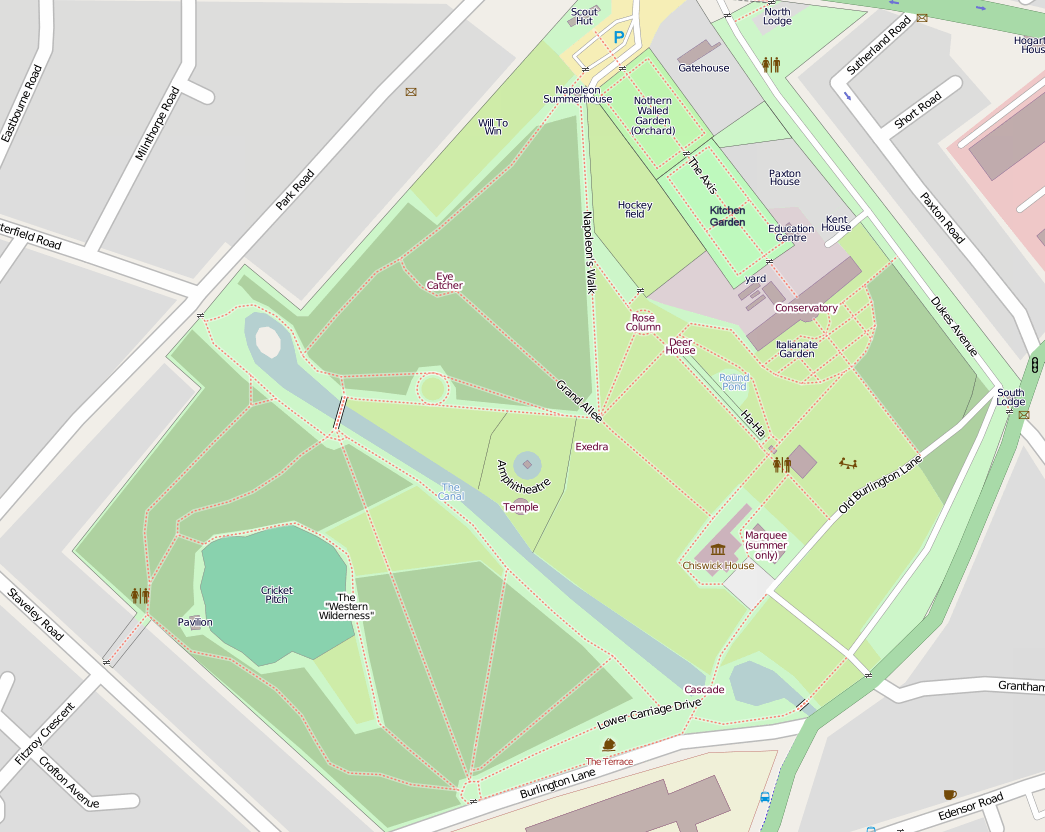
- An estate containing not an easement, but what could become easements, rights of way for example, on a transfer of part (severance) pursuant to the rule in Wheeldon v Burrows.
- Court: Court of Appeal
- Full case name: Wheeldon v Burrows
- Decided: 17 June 1879
- Citation: (1879) LR 12 Ch D 31; [1874-90] All ER Rep. 669; (1879) 48 LJ Ch 853; (1879) 41 LT 327

Court membership
- Judge sitting: Thesiger LJ

Keywords
- Easements; implied easements

Wheeldon v Burrows (1879) LR 12 Ch D 31 is an English land law case confirming and governing a means of the implied grant or grants of easements — the implied grant of all continuous and apparent inchoate easements (quasi easements, that is they would be easements if the land were not before transfer in the unity of possession and title) to a transferee of part, unless expressly excluded. The case consolidated one of the three current methods by which an easement can be acquired by implied grant.

It was little altered by subsequent case law by 1925 but has been further consolidated by section 62 of the Law of Property Act 1925. Both types of implied grant are widely excluded in agreements by sellers of part and to some extent other transferors of part, so that the retained land can be developed subject to general and local planning law constraints.

== Facts ==
Mr Tetley owned a piece of land and a workshop in Derby, which had windows overlooking and receiving light from the first piece of land. He sold the workshop to Mr Burrows, and the piece of land to Mr Wheeldon. Mr Wheeldon's widow (Mrs Wheeldon, the plaintiff) built on the piece of land, and it obstructed the windows of Mr Burrows' workshop. In response, Mr Burrows dismantled Mrs Wheeldon's construction, asserting an easement over the light passing through Wheeldon's lot. Mrs Wheeldon brought an action in trespass.

== Judgment ==
Thesiger LJ held that because the seller had not reserved the right of access to light the windows, no such right was passed to the purchaser of the workshop. So the buyer of the land could obstruct the workshop windows with building. However, the principles governing the area of law where are referred to said the following.

We have had a considerable number of cases cited to us, and out of them I think that two propositions may be stated as what I may call the general rule governing cases of this kind. The first of these rules is that, on the grant by the owner of a tenement of part of that tenement as it is then used and enjoyed, there will pass to the grantee all those continuous and apparent easements (by which of course I mean quasi easements), or, in other words, all those easements which are necessary to the reasonable enjoyment of the property granted, and which have been and are at the time of the grant used by the owners of the entirety for the benefit of the part granted. The second proposition is that, if the grantor intends to reserve any right over the tenement granted it is his duty to reserve it expressly in the grant… Both of the general rules which I have mentioned are founded upon a maxim which is as well established by authority as it is consistent with common sense, viz., that a grantor shall not derogate from his grant…

== See also ==
- English land law
- Easements in English law
