= Easement =

Right to use or enter real property

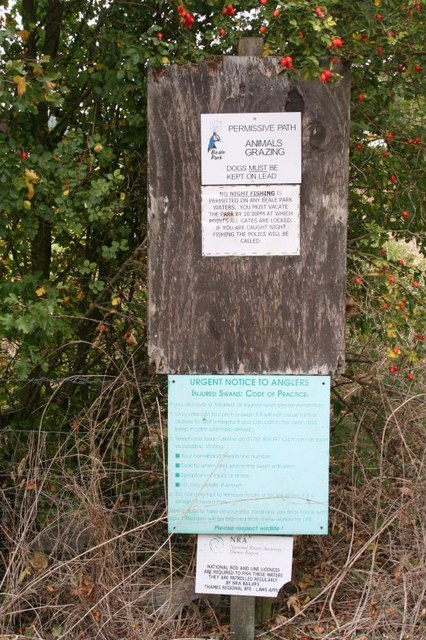
Notices by the path

An easement is a nonpossessory right to use or enter onto the real property of another. It is "best typified in the right of way which one landowner, A, may enjoy over the land of another, B". An easement is a property right and type of incorporeal property in itself at common law in most jurisdictions.

An easement is similar to real covenants and equitable servitudes. In the United States, the Restatement (Third) of Property takes steps to merge these concepts as servitudes.

Easements are helpful for providing a 'limited right to use another person's land for a stated purpose. For example, an easement may allow someone to use a road on their neighbor's land to get to their own.' Another example is someone's right to fish in a privately owned pond, or to have access to a public beach.

The rights of an easement holder vary substantially among jurisdictions.

== Types ==
Historically, common law courts would enforce only four types of easements:

1. Easements of way (also known as Right-of-way)
2. Easements of support (pertaining to excavations)
3. Easements of "light and air"
4. Rights pertaining to artificial waterways

Courts now recognize more varieties of easements, but these original four categories still form the foundation of easement law.

=== Affirmative or negative ===
An affirmative easement is the right to use another property for a specific purpose while a negative easement is the right to prevent another from performing an otherwise lawful activity on their own property. For example, an affirmative easement might allow land owner A to drive their cattle over the land of B. A has an affirmative easement from B. Conversely, a negative easement might restrict land owner A from putting up a wall of trees that would block the adjacent land owner B's mountain view. A is subject to a negative easement from B.

=== Dominant or servient estate ===
As defined by Evershed MR in Re Ellenborough Park [1956] Ch 131, an easement requires the existence of at least two pieces of land. The land with the benefit of the easement is the dominant estate or dominant tenement, while the land burdened by the easement is the servient estate or servient tenement. For example, the owner of parcel A holds an easement to use a driveway on parcel B to gain access to A's house. Here, parcel A is the dominant estate, receiving the benefit, and parcel B is the servient estate, granting the benefit or suffering the burden.

=== Public or private ===
A private easement is held by private individuals or entities. A public easement grants an easement to the public, for example, to allow public access over a parcel owned by an individual.

=== Appurtenant or in gross ===
In the US, an easement appurtenant is one that benefits the dominant estate and "runs with the land" and so generally transfers automatically when the dominant estate is transferred. An appurtenant easement allows property owners to access land that is only accessible through a neighbor's land.

Conversely, an easement in gross benefits an individual or a legal entity, rather than a dominant estate. The easement can be for a personal use (for example, an easement to use a boat ramp) or a commercial use (for example, an easement to a railroad company to cross property to build and maintain a rail line). Historically, an easement in gross was neither assignable nor inheritable, but commercial easements are now freely transferable to a third party. They are divisible but must be exclusive (the original owner no longer uses it and exclusive to easement holder) and all holders of the easement must agree to divide. If subdivided, each subdivided parcel enjoys the easement.

=== Floating ===
A floating easement exists when there is no fixed location, route, method, or limit to the right of way. For example, a right of way may cross a field, without any visible path, or allow egress through another building for fire safety purposes. A floating easement may be public or private, appurtenant or in gross. One case defined it as "(an) easement defined in general terms, without a definite location or description, is called a floating or roving easement". Furthermore, "a floating easement becomes fixed after construction and cannot thereafter be changed".

=== Wayleave ===
In general, a wayleave is a right to access or cross the land of another for some purpose. Frequently nowadays in British energy law and real property law, a wayleave is a type of easement, appurtenant to land or in gross, used by a utility that allows a linesman to enter the premises, "to install and retain their cabling or piping across private land in return for annual payments to the landowner". Like a license or profit-à-prendre, a "wayleave is normally a temporary arrangement and does not automatically transfer to a new owner or occupier". More generally, a wayleave agreement can be used for the infrastructure needs of any service provider, such as a telecommunications network, electricity grid or gas pipeline. In mining law, a wayleave is a right to cross a neighbour's land e.g. in order to convey a mineral to a seaport, and might include the right to run a private railway, payment depending on the tonnage conveyed. Variants of the concept included waterleaves (the right to drain away water) or airleaves (the right to convey air for ventilation).

In the United States, an easement in gross is used for such needs, especially for permanent rights.

=== Access ===
An access easement can provide access from public land, road or path or a public right of way to a parcel of land. For example, if Zach and James own neighboring parcels of land, Zach's parcel may have easement rights to cross James's parcel from public land, road or path or a public right of way. In such a case, Zach's "dominant" parcel would contain an access easement to cross James's "servient" parcel.

== Creation ==
An easement may be implied, express or created in other ways.

=== Express ===
Easements are most often created by express language in binding documents. Under most circumstances, having a conversation with another party is not sufficient. Parties generally grant an easement to another, or reserve an easement for themselves on disposition of land. An express easement may be "granted" or "reserved" in a deed or other legal instrument. Alternatively, it may be created by reference to a subdivision plan by "dedication" or in a restrictive covenant in the agreement of an owners association. Generally, the doctrines of contract law are central to disputes regarding express easements.

=== Implied ===
Implied easements are more complex and are determined by the courts based on the use of a property and the intention of the original parties, who can be private or public/government entities. Implied easements are not recorded or explicitly stated until a court decides a dispute, but reflect the practices and customs of use for a property. Courts typically refer to the intent of the parties, as well as prior use, to determine the existence of an implied easement. Disputes regarding implied easements usually apply the principles of property law.

A government authority or private service provider may acquire an implied easement over private land by virtue of the public service it performs. For example, a local authority may have the responsibility of installing and maintaining the sewage system in an urban area. Merely by the fact that it has that responsibility, usually enshrined in some statute or local laws, may give the authority the right, by virtue of an implied easement, to enter private property to carry out installation and maintenance. The location of the easement will not usually be described precisely, but its general position will be defined by the service route (i.e., the sewer pipes in this example). Power and water lines may also have implied easements linked to them, but drainage and stormwater systems are commonly precisely defined in location and recorded in the title documents for private land.

=== By necessity ===
Necessity alone is an insufficient claim to create any easement. Parcels without access to a public way may have an easement of access over adjacent land if crossing that land is absolutely necessary to reach the landlocked parcel and there has been some original intent to provide the lot with access, and the grant was never completed or recorded but is thought to exist. A court order is necessary to determine the existence of an easement by necessity. To obtain this generally the party which claims the easement files a lawsuit, and the judge weighs the relative damage caused by enforcing an easement against the servient estate against the damage to the dominant estate if the easement is found not to exist and is thus landlocked.

Because this method of creating an easement requires imposing a burden (the easement) upon another party for the benefit of the landlocked owner, the court looks to the original circumstances in weighing the relative apportionment of benefit and burden to both lots in making its equitable determination whether such easement shall be created by the court. This method of creating an easement, being an active creation by a court of an otherwise non-existent right, may be automatically extinguished upon termination of the necessity (for example, if a new public road is built adjacent to the landlocked tenement or another easement is acquired without regard to comparison of ease or practicality between the imposed easement and any valid substitute).

There is also an unwritten form of easement referred to as an implied easement or easement by implication, arising from the original subdivision of the land for continuous and obvious use of the adjacent parcel (e.g., for access to a road, or to a source of water) such as the right of lot owners in a subdivision to use the roadway on the approved subdivision plan without requiring a specific grant of easement to each new lot when first conveyed. An easement by necessity is distinguished from an easement by implication in that the easement by necessity arises only when "strictly necessary", whereas the easement by implication can arise when "reasonably necessary". Easement by necessity is a higher standard by which to imply an easement.

In India, easement of necessity could be claimed only in such cases where transfer, bequeathment or partition necessitates such claim.

As an example, some U.S. state statutes grant a permanent easement of access to any descendant of a person buried in a cemetery on private property.

In some states, such as New York, this type of easement is called an easement of necessity.

=== By prior use ===
An easement may also be created by prior use. Easements by prior use are based on the idea that land owners can intend to create an easement, but forget to include it in the deed.

There are five elements to establish an easement by prior use:

1. Common ownership of both properties at one time
2. Followed by a severance
3. Use occurs before the severance and afterward
4. Notice
  1. Not simply visibility, but apparent or discoverable by reasonable inspection (e.g. the hidden existence of a sewer line that a plumber could identify may be notice enough)
5. Necessary and beneficial
  1. Reasonably necessary
  2. Not the "strict necessity" required by an easement by necessity

==== Example ====
A sells the front lot, but forgets to get an easement for driveway access.

A owns two lots. One lot has access to a public street and the second is tucked behind it and fully landlocked. A's driveway leads from the public street, across the first lot and onto the second lot to A's house. A then sells off the first lot but forgets to reserve a driveway easement in the deed.

A originally had common ownership of both properties. A also used the driveway during this period. A then severed the land. Although A did not reserve an easement, the driveway is obviously on the property and a reasonable buyer would know what it is for. Finally, the driveway is reasonably necessary for a residential plot; here is an implied easement.

=== By prescription ===
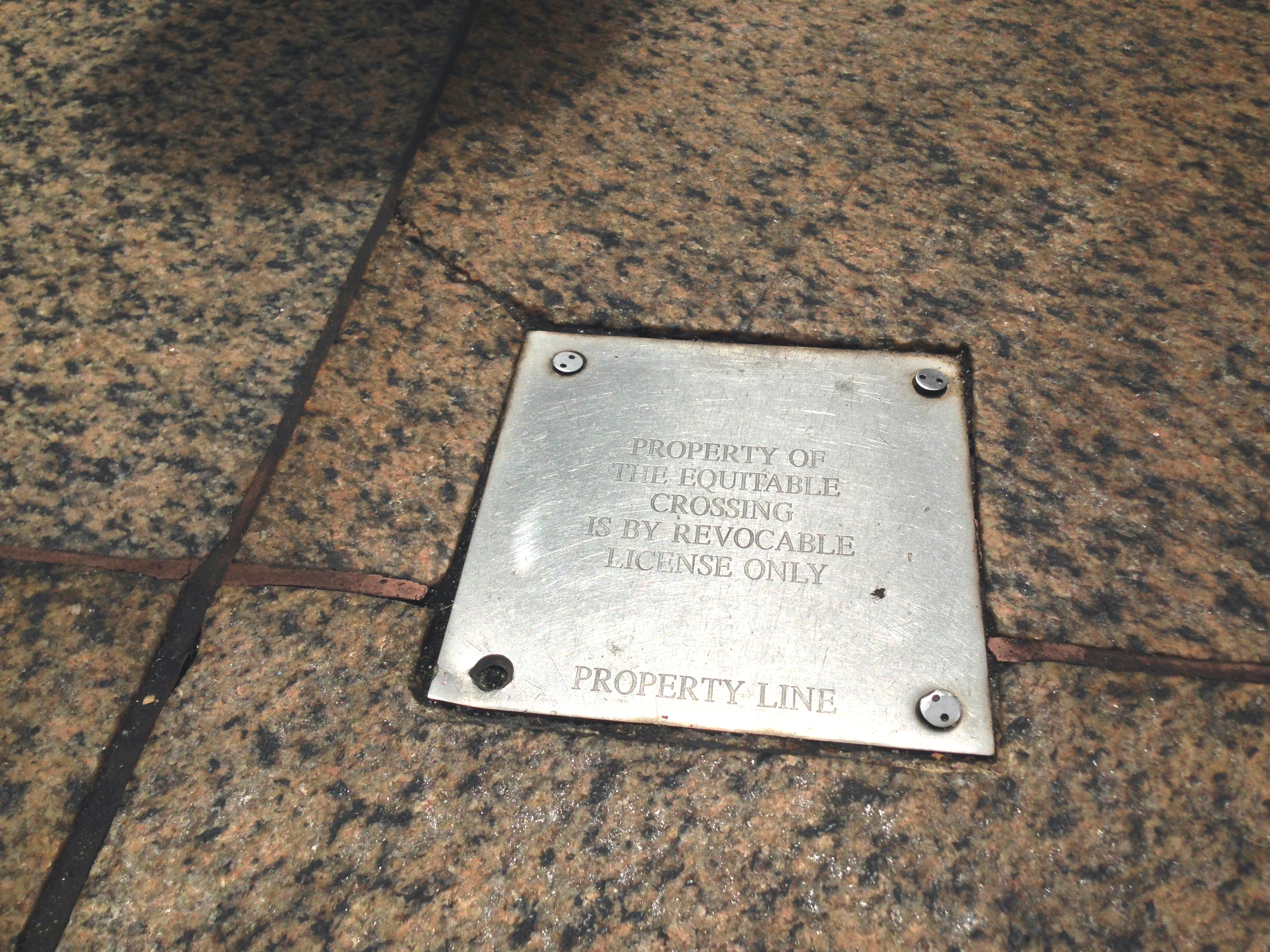
A metal plaque on the sidewalk of New York City to declare that the crossing onto the private property is a revocable license to protect it from becoming an easement by prescription

Easements by prescription, also called prescriptive easements, are implied easements granted after the dominant estate has used the property in a hostile, continuous and open manner for a statutorily prescribed number of years. Prescriptive easements differ from adverse possession by not requiring exclusivity.

Once they become legally binding, easements by prescription hold the same legal weight as written or implied easements. But, before they become binding, they hold no legal weight and are broken if the true property owner takes appropriate acts to defend their ownership rights. Easement by prescription is typically found in legal systems based on common law, although other legal systems may also allow easement by prescription.

Laws and regulations vary among local and national governments, but some traits are common to most prescription laws:

- open and notorious (i.e., obvious to anyone)
- actual, continuous (i.e., uninterrupted for the entire required time period); this does not necessarily require use daily, weekly, etc.
- adverse to the rights of the true property owner
- hostile (i.e., in opposition to the claim of another; this can be accidental, not "hostile" in the common sense)
- continuous for a period of time defined by statute or appellate case law

Unlike fee simple adverse possession, prescriptive easements typically do not require exclusivity. In states that do, such as Virginia, the exclusivity requirement has been interpreted to mean that the prescriptive user must use the easement in a different way from the general public, i.e., a use that is "exclusive" to that user.

The period of continuous use for a prescriptive easement to become binding is generally between 5 and 30 years depending upon local laws (sometimes based on the statute of limitations on trespass). Generally, if the true property owner acts appropriately to defend their property rights at any time during the required time period the hostile use will end, claims on adverse possession rights are voided, and the continuous use time period will be reset to zero.

In some jurisdictions, if the use is not hostile but given actual or implied consent by the legal property owner, the prescriptive easement may become a regular or implied easement rather than a prescriptive easement and immediately becomes binding. An example of this is the lengthy Irish Lissadell House rights of way case heard since 2010, that extended long-standing consents given to individuals into a public right of way.

In other jurisdictions, such permission immediately converts the easement into a terminable license, or restarts the time for obtaining a prescriptive easement.

Government- or railroad-owned property is generally immune from prescriptive easement in most cases, but some other types of government owned-property may be subject to prescription in certain instances. In New York, such government property is subject to a longer statute of limitations of action, 20 years instead of 10 years for private property.

In most U.S. jurisdictions, a prescriptive easement can only be determined for an affirmative easement not a negative easement. In all U.S. jurisdictions, an easement for view (which is a negative easement) cannot be created by prescription.

Prescription may also be used to end an existing legal easement. For example, if a servient tenement (estate) holder were to erect a fence blocking a legally deeded right-of-way easement, the dominant tenement holder would have to act to defend their easement rights during the statutory period or the easement might cease to have legal force, even though it would remain a deeded document. Failure to use an easement leading to loss of the easement is sometimes referred to as "non-user".

==== Quebec ====
Under the civil law of Quebec possessors with the animus (will) to be owners can acquire a right of ownership (or to a dismemberment of ownership if animus is to inclined) as long as the nature of possession is peaceful, continuous, public and unequivocal throughout. (According to article 2922 of the Civil Code of Quebec or CCQ) the prescribed period is 10 years (2917–2920 CCQ), except as otherwise provided by law. (2918 sets a different time for unregistered property. Reduced from 30 years.)

Exceptions to prescription: Possession cannot establish a servitude under 1181 CCQ, but non-use of a servitude will extinguish it.

==== Louisiana ====
In the state of Louisiana, a mixed legal jurisdiction with strong civil law roots, prescription can be either acquisitive or liberative, both of which involve the creation or extinguishing of rights over time. Acquisitive prescription in Louisiana is analogous to the common law idea of adverse possession. As defined in La. C.C. Art. 3446, "acquisitive prescription is a mode of acquiring ownership or other real rights by possession for a period of time." Unlike the common law adverse position, Louisiana's acquisitive prescription is not a procedural bar to recovering property but the creation of a new ownership right in the property. Time periods for acquisitive prescription depend on whether the property is movable or immovable and whether the property is possessed in good faith (possessor believes they have title to the property) or in bad faith.

Liberative prescription is analogous to the common law statute of limitations. As defined in La. C.C. Art. 3447, "liberative prescription is a mode of barring of actions as a result of inaction for a period of time." It can be renewed by the party who has gained its protection. For example, a debtor's admission that a debt is still owed renews the creditor's claim against the debtor and starts the tolling of another prescriptive period. This differs from peremption, which is a fixed time for the existence of a legal right and which cannot be renewed like liberative prescription.

=== By estoppel ===
When a property owner misrepresents the existence of an easement while selling a property and does not include in the deed to the buyer an express easement over an adjoining property that the seller owns, a court may step in and create an easement. Easements by estoppel generally look to any promises not made in writing, any money spent by the benefiting party in reliance on the representations of the burdened party, and other factors. If the court finds that the buyer acted reasonably and in good faith and relied on the seller's promises, the court may create an easement by estoppel.

For example: Ray sells land to Joe on the promise that Joe can use Ray's driveway and bridge to the main road at any time, but Ray does not include the easement in the deed to the land. Joe, deciding that the land is now worth the price, builds a house and connects a garage to Ray's driveway. If Ray (or his successor) later decides to gate off the driveway and prevent Joe (or Joe's successor) from accessing the driveway, a court would likely find an easement by estoppel.

Because Joe purchased the land believing that there would be access to the bridge and the driveway and Joe then paid for a house and a connection, Joe can be said to rely on Ray's promise of an easement. Ray materially misrepresented the facts to Joe. In order to preserve equity, the court will likely find an easement by estoppel.

On the other hand, if Ray had offered access to the bridge and driveway after selling Joe the land, there may not be an easement by estoppel. In this instance, it is merely inconvenient if Ray revokes access to the driveway. Joe did not purchase the land and build the house in reliance on access to the driveway and bridge. Joe will need to find a separate theory to justify an easement.

=== By government ===
In the United States, easements may be acquired (bought) by the government using its power of eminent domain in a condemnation proceeding in the courts. Note that in the United States, in accordance with the Fifth Amendment to the U.S. Constitution, property cannot simply be taken by the government unless the property owner is compensated for the fair market value of what is taken. This is true whether the government acquires full ownership of the property ("fee title") or a lesser property interest, such as an easement. For example, utility providers are typically granted jurisdiction-wide easement to access and maintain their existing infrastructure.

In the law of England and Wales following the incorporation of the European Convention on Human Rights into English law, any deprivation of the rights of the owner of property must be "in accordance with law" as well as "necessary in a democratic society" and "proportionate".

=== By equity ===
In certain jurisdictions in the United States, especially California, the court has the power to grant an equitable easement based on principles of equity (fairness). Equitable easements can be created for physical encroachments where the court balances the hardships of the properties and determines an easement is warranted. When determining whether to award an equitable easement, courts utilize the “relative hardship” test. The test is based on the following three factors:

1. The defendant must be innocent. This means that the encroachment must not be willful or based on a negligent act.
2. Unless the rights to the public would be harmed, the court will not allow the encroachment to remain if the encroached upon party will suffer irreparable injury.
3. The hardship to the encroacher must be greatly disproportionate (more) than the hardship to the encroached upon party by allowing the encroachment to remain.

Unlike other methods of easement creation, if the court determines that an equitable easement exists, then property owners who are encroached upon are generally entitled to damages.

== Difference from license ==
Licenses to use property in a nonpossessory manner are similar to but more limited than easements but, under certain circumstances, can be transformed into easements by the courts. Some general differences do exist:

- An easement is appurtenant to and only for the benefit of specific land whereas a licence is a personal right.
- An easement is owned incorporeal property which cannot be revoked whereas a license is revocable.
- An easement owner, as the owner of incorporeal property, can take legal action regarding their property in their own name, whereas a licence holder has no standing of their own to take legal action regarding the property against any other party (other than the landowner) and must have the landowner take action or take action in the landowner's name.
- An easement, is owned incorporeal property that, usually, may be transferred to successive owners whereas a licence is a personal right.
- An easement may run with the land or terminate whereas a license is typically limited in duration.
- A license is often uninsurable.
- A license is often not recorded.
- A license is often vested in one person.

Easements, as property rights owned by the beneficiary and usually recorded on titles, are stronger than licenses which are merely personal rights under contract. Purported licenses that have any of the properties of an easement may be determined to be easements or bound by the higher standards for termination of an easement.

== Termination ==
A party claiming termination should show one or more of the following factors:

- Release: agreement to terminate by the grantor and the grantee of the easement
- Expiration: the easement reaches an expiration date, event or condition.
- Abandonment: the holder demonstrates intent to discontinue the easement
- Merger: When one owner gains title to both dominant and servient tenement
  - Mortgaged properties with merged easements that then go into foreclosure can cause the easement to revive when the bank takes possession of part of the dominant estate
- Necessity: If the easement was created by necessity and the necessity no longer exists
- Estoppel: The easement is unused and the servient estate takes some action in reliance on the easement's termination
- Prescription: The servient estate reclaims the easement with actual, open, hostile and continuous use of the easement
- Condemnation: The government exercises eminent domain or the land is officially condemned. Depending on the situation this could take a number of forms. A government can condemn a plot of land and remove an easement even if the easement is in favor of the adjoining property owner.
- Statutory termination: The easement is terminated by or under a statute law.

== Rights ==
See also, Right of way (property access)

The following rights are recognized of an easement:

- Right to light, also called solar easement. The right to receive a minimum quantity of light in favour of a window or other aperture in a building which is primarily designed to admit light.
- Aviation easement. The right to use the airspace above a specified altitude for aviation purposes. Also known as aviation easement, where needed for low-altitude spraying of adjacent agricultural property.
- Railroad easement.
- Utility easement, including:
  - Storm drain or storm water easement. An easement to carry rainwater to a river, wetland, detention pond, or other body of water.
  - Sanitary sewer easement. An easement to carry used water to a sewage treatment plant.
  - Electrical power line easement.
  - Telephone line easement.
  - Fuel gas pipe easement.
- Sidewalk easement. Usually sidewalks are in the public right-of-way.
- View easement. Prevents someone from blocking the view of the easement owner, or permits the owner to cut the blocking vegetation on the land of another.
- Driveway easement, also known as easement of access. Some lots do not border a road, so an easement through another lot must be provided for access. Sometimes adjacent lots have "mutual" driveways that both lot owners share to access garages in the backyard. The houses are so close together that there can only be a single driveway to both backyards. The same can also be the case for walkways to the backyard: the houses are so close together that there is only a single walkway between the houses and the walkway is shared. Even when the walkway is wide enough, easement may exist to allow for access to the roof and other parts of the house close to a lot boundary. To avoid disputes, such easement should be recorded in each property deed.
- Beach access. Some jurisdictions permit residents to access a public lake or beach by crossing adjacent private property. Similarly, there may be a private easement to cross a private lake to reach a remote private property, or an easement to cross private property during high tide to reach remote beach property on foot.
- Dead end easement. Sets aside a path for pedestrians on a dead-end street to access the next public way. These could be contained in covenants of a homeowner association, notes in a subdivision plan, or directly in the deeds of the affected properties.
- Recreational easement. Some U.S. states offer tax incentives to larger landowners if they grant permission to the public to use their undeveloped land for recreational use (not including motorized vehicles). If the landowner posts the land (i.e., "No Trespassing") or prevents the public from using the easement, the tax abatement is revoked and a penalty may be assessed. Recreational easement also includes such easements as equestrian, fishing, hunting, hiking, trapping, biking (e.g., Indiana's Calumet Trail) and other such uses.
- Conservation easement. Grants rights to a land trust to limit development in order to protect the environment.
- Historic preservation easement. Similar to the conservation easement, typically grants rights to a historic preservation organization to enforce restrictions on alteration of a historic building's exterior or interior.
- Easement of lateral and subjacent support. Prohibits an adjoining land owner from digging too deep on his lot or in any manner depriving his neighbor of vertical or horizontal support on the latter's structures, e.g., buildings, fences, etc.
- Communications easement. This easement can be used for wireless communications towers, cable lines, and other communications services. This is a private easement and the rights granted by the property owner are for the specific use of communications.
- Ingress/egress easement. This easement can be used for entering and exiting a property through or over the easement area. This might be used for a person's driveway, going over another person's property.

== Trespass ==
Blocking access to someone who has an easement is a trespass upon the easement and creates a cause of action for civil suit. For example, putting up a fence across a long-used public path through private property may be a trespass and a court may order the obstacle removed. Turning off the water supply to a downstream neighbor may similarly trespass on the neighbor's water easement.

Open and continuous trespassing upon an easement can lead to the extinguishment of an easement by prescription (see above) if no action is taken to cure the limitation over an extended period.

== Torrens title registration ==
Under the Torrens title system of land ownership registration, easements are recorded on the titles kept in the central land registry or cadastre and any unrecorded easement is not recognised. No easement by prescription or implication may be claimed unless it was created prior to the land being brought under the Torrens system or there is an exception to indefeasibility.

== See also ==
- Air rights
- Countryside and Rights of Way Act 2000 (England and Wales)
- Crown land (see "logging and mineral rights" under Canada)
- Easements in English law
- Fee tail
- Ginnel
- M.P.M. Builders, LLC v. Dwyer
- Party wall, often subject to easement
- Prior appropriation water rights
- Right of public access to the wilderness
- Riparian water rights
- Servitude (Roman law)
- Servitude in civil law
- Turbary
