= Peter Gibson (judge) =

British judge

The Right Honourable Sir Peter Gibson

Lord Justice of Appeal
- In office 1993–2005
- Monarch: Elizabeth II

Justice of the High Court

Personal details
- Born: 10 June 1934 (age 92)
- Education: Worcester College, Oxford
- Occupation: Judge
- Profession: Law

Sir Peter Leslie Gibson (born 10 June 1934) is a British former barrister and Lord Justice of Appeal of the Court of Appeal of England and Wales, and was a judge of the Qatar International Court. Gibson has also served, between April 2006 and December 2010, as the UK's Intelligence Services Commissioner, and was appointed by David Cameron in July 2010 to lead the Detainee Inquiry. He is an honorary member of the Society of Legal Scholars.

== Education and career ==
Gibson was educated at Malvern College and graduated from Worcester College, Oxford of which he was an open scholar and he is an Honorary Fellow.

He was called to the Bar by the Inner Temple in 1960 and was appointed the Chancery Treasury Counsel in 1972. He joined ad eundem Lincoln's Inn of which he became a Bencher in 1975 and the Treasurer in 1996. He was knighted and appointed to the High Court of Justice in 1981, serving in the Chancery Division. He served as a judge of the Employment Appeal Tribunal from 1984 to 1986, and as Chairman of the Law Commission for England and Wales from 1990 to 1992. From 1993 until 2005, he was a Lord Justice of Appeal of the Court of Appeal of England and Wales. In 2006, he was made Intelligence Services Commissioner by Tony Blair, with his first term expiring in 2009. In 2008 he was appointed by Gordon Brown to review the 1998 Omagh bombing intelligence and reported to the Prime Minister on it. On 1 April 2009, Gordon Brown appointed him ISC for a second term, though Gibson stepped down early, at the end of 2010, in order to chair an inquiry into "whether the UK was implicated in the improper treatment of detainees held by other countries that may have occurred after 9/11". He was succeeded, on 1 January 2011, as ISC by Sir Mark Waller.

Gibson was a judge of the Qatar International Court from 2006 to 2014.

=== Judgments ===
- Wheeler v JJ Saunders Ltd [1994] EWCA Civ 32 - case on nuisance which amended the precedent set by Gillingham Borough Council v Medway (Chatham) Dock Co Ltd.

== Detainee Inquiry ==
On 6 July 2010, Prime Minister David Cameron appointed Gibson to head the Detainee Inquiry, which would examine whether and if so to what extent the British Government and its agencies were involved in improper treatment of detainees held by other countries in counter-terrorism operations overseas or were aware of improper treatment of detainees in operations in which the UK was involved.

In his letter dated 6 July 2010 to Gibson Cameron set out the parameters of the Inquiry. They included that the Inquiry was to be non-statutory, that it was of fundamental importance to protect national security and not to undermine international intelligence sharing undertakings and that there were limitations on what could be reviewed in public. Cameron said that the Inquiry could not start until the conclusion of police investigations into matters related to what the Inquiry was to examine but he indicated that the Inquiry could read into relevant material in the preparatory phase of the Inquiry.

Human and civil rights and other advocacy groups criticised the Inquiry, alleging that it lacked independence, impartiality, openness that it failed to meet what it called the UK's stringent obligations under domestic and international law to comprehensively investigate claims of torture. Some NGOs considered boycotting the inquiry.

In 2012, the Government decided that because of the further indefinite delay before the Inquiry could commence it would bring the Inquiry's role to an end, but it requested the Inquiry to report to the Prime Minister on the work it had done and to indicate what issues it might have wanted to examine. On 27 June 2012, the Inquiry delivered to the Prime Minister its full report and an open version of that report. That version removed those parts of the full report which for national security reasons it considered should not be made public. In the report the Inquiry referred to the 20,000 documents which it had received and collated and set out 27 issues for further examination.

After a much-criticised delay, the report of the Inquiry was published by the Government on 19 December 2013. It was announced that the Parliamentary Intelligence and Security Committee would inquire into the issues identified by the Detainee Inquiry and report.

== Arms ==
Coat of arms of Peter Gibson

Motto
Fortem Posce Animum
