= John May (judge) =

British judge (1923–1997)

Sir John Douglas May, PC (28 June 1923 – 15 January 1997) was a British Court of Appeal judge appointed by the British Government to investigate the miscarriages of justice related to the Maguire Seven and other miscarriages linked to IRA bombing offences.

May was educated at Clifton College and Balliol College, Oxford, where he was a scholar. During World War II, he served with the Royal Naval Volunteer Reserve. He was called to the bar by the Inner Temple in 1947 and took silk in 1965. He was appointed to the High Court and assigned to the Queen's Bench Division in 1972, receiving the customary knighthood. In 1982, he was made a Lord Justice of Appeal and made a Privy Counsellor, serving until 1989.

== Maguire Seven inquiry ==
On 20 October 1989 following the quashing of the Guildford Four convictions, May was appointed to chair an inquiry into both that case and the related case of the Maguire Seven.

On 12 July 1990, the Home Secretary David Waddington published the interim report, Interim Report on the Maguire Case: The Inquiry into the circumstances surrounding the convictions arising out of the bomb attacks in Guildford and Woolwich in 1974.

The report criticised the trial judge Lord Donaldson of Lymington. It unearthed improprieties in the handling of scientific evidence that were relevant to the other cases and declared the convictions unsound and recommended referral back to the Court of Appeal.

The scientific work in examining the failings of the original forensic work leading to the convictions was undertaken by the "West" Committee led by Professor Thomas Summers West CBE FRS and the findings published in 1992 in Sir John May's report to the House of Commons entitled the Second Maguire report.

=== RARDE scientific tests ===
The Inquiry found that RARDE scientists Walter Elliott and Douglas Higgs had lied and suppressed evidence at the trials of Judith Ward and the Maguire Seven.

The terms of reference of the initial inquiry were expanded, as a result, to include

- The preparation of court evidence by expert witnesses
- The advance disclosure of scientific findings
- The authorisation of prosecutions based on scientific evidence
- Home Office assessment of scientific evidence after miscarriage claims

=== Royal Commission on Criminal Justice ===
On 14 March 1991, the inquiry became the Royal Commission on Criminal Justice covering the systemic problems uncovered earlier. The commission was chaired by Viscount Runciman of Doxford.

== Judgments ==
- Wheeler v JJ Saunders Ltd [1994] EWCA Civ 32 - case on nuisance which amended the precedent set by Gillingham Borough Council v Medway (Chatham) Dock Co Ltd.
