= Dangerous and offensive trades =

Dangerous and offensive trades or offensive trades are business activities that deal with processing dead animals or that generate unpleasant smells. The term is used in jurisdictions that include India and some former British possessions.

Offensive industries can encompass a variety of commercial activities, but mainly involve the handling of animal carcasses and hides. Regulation is aimed at public health, addressing risks such as injury or death, chemical risks from natural or synthetic substances used, or biological risk from pathogens and vermin.

== Definition ==
The Oxford Dictionary of Public Health defines offensive trades as

An official designation used in some countries to describe an industry or trade that damages the health and/or economic interests of significant numbers of people in the neighborhood or environment of that industry. The term is usually applied to an industry that produces unpleasant odors, such as a tannery or rendering plant, which in many jurisdictions is subject to public health regulations dealing with abatement of nuisances.

== History ==
=== Early sanitary reform (1840s-1860s) ===
In response to recurring cholera outbreaks, the Royal Commission on the Health of Towns was established in 1843. Its reports (published in 1844-45) strongly criticized the overcrowded, filth-laden conditions of urban housing and infrastructure, calling for unified sanitary authorities empowered to enforce drainage, paving, and water-supply reforms. These concerns yielded a series of Nuisance Removal and Disease Prevention Acts. The Nuisances Removal, etc. Act 1846 (9 & 10 Vict. c. 96) allowed local authorities to act on “nuisances” certified by medical practitioners, and to issue orders to deintensify these threats to health.

The Public Health Act 1848 further consolidated powers: it created a local board of health, allowed for the formation of other local health boards, and empowered them to appoint medical officers of health and sanitary inspectors tasked with identifying and eliminating health hazards. Nevertheless, the 1848 reforms were permissive rather than mandatory; without strong enforcement and funding, many local boards failed to act decisively.

By 1866, reformers strengthened these powers through the Sanitary Act 1866, which obliged local councils to inspect their districts, remove nuisances, and act against health risks. It also expanded authorities’ responsibilities for house drainage and water supply.

=== Institutional consolidation (1870s–1880s) ===
In the early 1870s, governmental reform continued. A Royal Commission in 1869 reviewed sanitary law and administration, and its findings shaped further legislation. The Public Health Act 1875 was a landmark in consolidating public health regulation. It codified earlier measures, placed even stronger obligations on local authorities, and introduced by-laws to manage “offensive trades” explicitly. Under the 1875 act, certain trades (blood-boiling, bone-boiling, fellmongering, soap-boiling, tallow-melting, and offal- or tripe-boiling) were defined for the first time as “noxious or offensive trades.”

Local authorities could refuse permission to set up these businesses, impose penalties, and make by-laws to control their effects. The act also made it a duty of the local authority to initiate legal action if a trade was certified to be a nuisance to health.

=== Extension regulation (1890s-Present) ===
The Public Health Acts Amendment Act 1907 (7 Edw. 7. c. 53) modernized the 1875 provisions: it gave local authorities broader discretion to declare any trade “offensive” by order, rather than relying purely on a fixed blacklist.

Separately, concerns over occupational health also led to specific regulation of hazardous industry. In 1895, a formal “Dangerous Trades Committee” was established to examine severe health risks in various industries (such as lead, mercury, arsenic, and phosphorus) and advise on regulation.

Later laws, such as the Factories Act 1961, consolidated many regulations regarding workplace health, safety, and welfare.

== Individual countries ==
=== Barbados ===
In Barbados, the following are considered offensive trades:

- Blood or offal boiling
- Bone boiling or crushing
- Chemical or acid making
- Fellmongering
- Glue making
- Gut spinning
- Gut scraping
- Manure manufacturing
- Slaughtering
- Soap boiling
- Tallow melting
- Tanning

=== India ===
Offensive trades are classified under the Municipalities of India by an act passed by the Legislature of India that requires licensing and also serves as a source of income for the states and municipalities. The trades practiced by the traders are called "D & O Traders".
