= 1851 in the United Kingdom =

Events from the year 1851 in the United Kingdom.

== Incumbents ==
- Monarch – Victoria
- Prime Minister – Lord John Russell (Whig)
- Foreign Secretary – Henry John Temple, 3rd Viscount Palmerston (until 26 December) Granville Leveson-Gower, 2nd Earl Granville (starting 26 December)

== Events ==
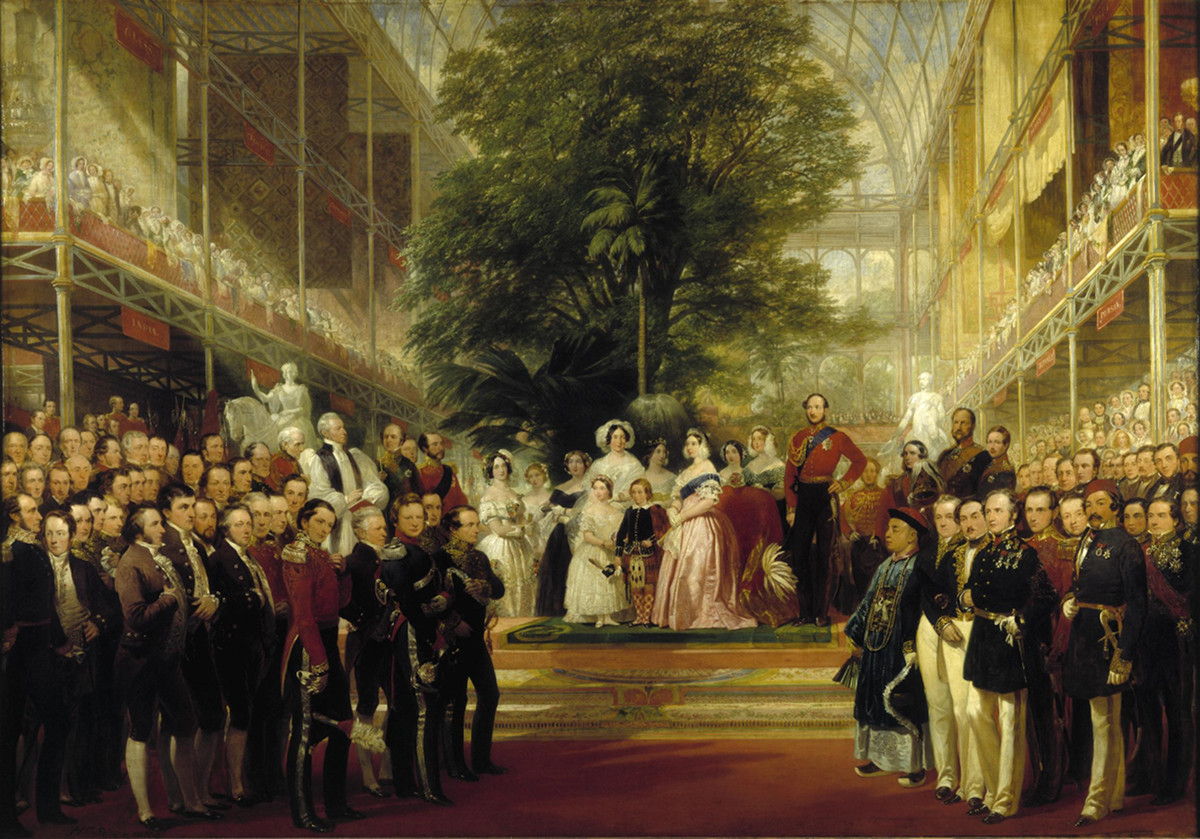
The Opening of the Great Exhibition by Queen Victoria by Henry Courtney Selous. Great Exhibition in The Crystal Palace is opened on 1 May

.

- February–March – Brief resignation of government and Cabinet crisis over passage of the Ecclesiastical Titles Act.
- March – Sculptor Frederick Scott Archer makes public the wet plate collodion photographic process.
- 12 March – Foundation of Owens College, Manchester, predecessor of the Victoria University of Manchester.
- 30 March – The United Kingdom Census 1851 is the first to include detailed ages, date and place of birth, occupations and marital status of those listed. The population of the UK is revealed to have reached 21 million. 6.3 million live in cities of 20,000 or more in England and Wales and such cities account for 35% of the total English population. Uniquely, this census also counts attendance at places of religious worship: it shows that only 35% of the population attend and, of those, nonconformists are in a majority. As part of the legacy of the Great Irish Famine, the population of Ireland has fallen to 6,575,000, a drop of 1.6 million in ten years.
- 6 April – Henry Edward Manning is received into the Roman Catholic Church.
- 1 May – The Great Exhibition of the Works of Industry of All Nations in the Crystal Palace, Hyde Park, London is opened by Queen Victoria.
- 26 May – The first international chess tournament held in London, organised by Howard Staunton.
- c. June – Sir Edwin Landseer's painting of a Scottish stag, The Monarch of the Glen, is first exhibited, at the Royal Academy Summer Exhibition.
- 5 June – Arsenic Act 1851, placing restrictions on the sale of the substance, comes into force.
- 24 June – Abolition of the Window Tax.
- July
  - Banker David Salomons attempts to occupy the seat to which he has been elected in the House of Commons but is prevented from doing so since, as a Jew, he is unable to take the oath in the prescribed form.
  - Florence Nightingale's father allows her to return to the Institution of Protestant Deaconesses at Kaiserswerth in Germany for 3 months of nurse training.
- 24 July – Housing Acts promoted by the Earl of Shaftesbury are passed:
  - Common Lodging Houses Act gives local authorities power to supervise common lodging houses for the poor and migratory people for public health purposes.
  - Labouring Classes Lodging Houses Act gives local authorities power to provide lodging houses for single working people, but is little used.
- 1 August – Ecclesiastical Titles Act ("An Act to prevent the Assumption of certain Ecclesiastical Titles in respect of Places in the United Kingdom"), passed into law in response to the previous year's recreation of the Roman Catholic hierarchy by the papal bull Universalis Ecclesiae, attempts to prevent the use of English titles by Catholic bishops; it has no practical effect.
- 22 August – The first international challenge for the 100 Guineas Cup yacht race (later known after the winner, America, as the America's Cup) is held around the Isle of Wight.
- 15 October – End of the Great Exhibition.
- 23 October – Exiled Hungarian regent-president Lajos Kossuth arrives at Southampton. After a tour of the UK and 6 months in the United States, he will spend 8 years in England.
- 24 October – Ariel and Umbriel, moons of Uranus, are discovered by William Lassell.
- 13 November – The first protected submarine telegraph cable is laid across the English Channel.
- 19 December – Palmerston is dismissed as Foreign Secretary for sending a congratulatory telegram to Napoleon III on his recent coup d'ėtat.

=== Undated ===
- The New Model Union the Amalgamated Society of Engineers, Machinists, Smiths, Millwrights and Patternmakers is formed.
- Royal School of Mines established, as the Government School of Mines and Science Applied to the Art.
- The Royal Marsden is established as the Free Cancer Hospital by surgeon William Marsden in London, the world's first specialist cancer hospital.
- Admiralty determines that Welsh steam coal is the best suited to its ships, giving a boost to the South Wales industry.
- The card game Happy Families is introduced by Jaques of London.

== Publications ==
- Edward Creasy's military history book The Fifteen Decisive Battles of the World.
- 'Lady Maria Clutterbuck' (Catherine Dickens)'s cookbook What Shall We Have for Dinner? Satisfactorily Answered by Numerous Bills of Fare for from Two to Eighteen Persons.
- Mrs Gaskell's novel Cranford begins serialisation.
- Henry Mayhew's social survey London Labour and the London Poor collected in book form.
- John Henry Newman's Lectures on the Present Position of Catholics in England.
- John Ruskin's treatise The Stones of Venice vol. 1.
- Herbert Spencer's book Social Statics

== Births ==
- 16 January – William Hall-Jones, 16th Prime Minister of New Zealand (died 1936)
- 23 February – Frederick Warde, actor (died 1935)
- 13 March – George Newnes, periodical publisher (died 1910)
- 18 March – Rose Coghlan, actress (died 1932)
- 12 April – Edward Walter Maunder, astronomer (died 1928)
- 20 April – Young Tom Morris, Scottish golfer (died 1875)
- 28 May – Dick Barlow, cricketer (died 1919)
- 12 June – Oliver Lodge, physicist (died 1940)
- 21 June – Frederick Green, footballer (died 1928)
- 5 July – William Lionel Wyllie, marine painter (died 1931)
- 8 July – Arthur Evans, archaeologist (died 1941)
- 19 September – William Lever, 1st Viscount Leverhulme, soap-maker and philanthropist (died 1925)
- 29 September – Hardwicke Rawnsley, clergyman, poet, hymn-writer and conservationist (died 1920)
- 5 October – Frederic Fisher, admiral (died 1943)
- 30 October – George Lennox Watson, Scottish naval architect (died 1904)
- 21 November – Leslie Ward ("Spy"), caricaturist (died 1922)
- 24 November – John Indermaur, lawyer (died 1925)
- 8 December – St. George Littledale, big game hunter (died 1931)
- 20 December – Dora Montefiore, suffragist and socialist (died 1933)
- 27 December – Percy Gilchrist, industrialist (died 1935)

== Deaths ==
- 23 January – Archibald Primrose, Lord Dalmeny, Scottish politician (born 1809)
- 1 February – Mary Shelley, author (born 1797)
- 23 February – Joanna Baillie, Scottish writer (born 1762)
- 7 April – Henry Thomas Alken, engraver, illustrator and sporting artist (born 1785)
- 29 May – Bartholomew Frere, diplomat (born 1776)
- 10 June – Robert Dundas, 2nd Viscount Melville, politician (born 1771)
- 17 July
  - John Farey Jr., mechanical engineer and technical writer (born 1791)
  - John Lingard, Roman Catholic priest (born 1771)
  - Roger Sheaffe, general (born 1763)
- 8 August – James Broadwood, piano manufacturer (born 1772)
- 22 September – Sarah Elizabeth Utterson, translator and author (born 1781)
- 13 October – Samuel Beazley, theatre architect and writer (born 1786)
- 29 October – William Wyon, engraver (born 1795)
- 11 November – John Dowdeswell, English politician (born 1772)
- 6 December – John Buckler, draughtsman and engraver (born 1770)
- 7 December – Sir John Gladstone, 1st Baronet, merchant (born 1764)
- 19 December
  - Henry Luttrell, politician, wit and society poet (born c. 1765)
  - J. M. W. Turner, painter (born 1775)
