= Shaftesbury Act =

Shaftesbury Act 1851 can refer to:

- The Labouring Classes Lodging Houses Act 1851, British legislation
- The Common Lodging Houses Act 1851, British legislation
