= Infectious Disease (Notification) Act 1889 =

Act of the Parliament of the United Kingdom

Infectious Disease (Notification) Act 1889 (Note: Section 1.)
- Act of Parliament
- Parliament of the United Kingdom
- Long title: An Act to provide for the Notification of Infectious Disease to Local Authorities.
- Citation: 52 & 53 Vict. c. 72
- Territorial extent: United Kingdom

Dates
- Royal assent: 30 August 1889
- Commencement: 30 August 1889 (Note: Section 2.)
- Repealed: England and Wales: 1 October 1937; Northern Ireland: Scotland: 1 January 2010
Other legislation
Amended by	Public Health (London) Act 1891; Infectious Disease (Notification) Extension Act 1899; Local Government Act 1933
Repealed by	England and Wales: Public Health Act 1936; Northern Ireland: Public Health Act (Northern Ireland) 1967; Scotland: Public Health etc. (Scotland) Act 2008

Status: Repealed

Text of statute as originally enacted

Revised text of statute as amended

The Infectious Disease (Notification) Act 1889 (52 & 53 Vict. c. 72) was an act of the Parliament of the United Kingdom. It was compulsory in London and optional in the rest of the country. It later became a mandatory law with the Infectious Disease (Notification) Extension Act 1899 (62 & 63 Vict. c. 8). These acts required householders and/or general practitioners to report cases of infectious disease to the local sanitary authority. The following diseases were covered by the acts: smallpox, cholera, diphtheria, membranous croup. erysipelas, scarlatina or scarlet fever, typhus fever, typhoid fever, enteric fever, relapsing fever, continued fever and puerperal fever. Householders or general practitioners who failed to notify a case of one of these diseases was liable to a fine of up to forty shillings.

The act came about after experiments in fifty provincial towns and cities that had adopted some form of infectious diseases notification through a local act of Parliament. These local laws were important forerunners of the national legislation, but they covered less than one-quarter of the country’s urban population and no rural sanitary authority had a local act in place in 1889. The act was widely taken up and by the time the mandatory act came into effect, notification reached almost all corners of the UK.

Following receipt of a notification certificate, the local sanitary authority's Medical Officer of Health could pursue existing public health laws, such as the Public Health Act 1875 (38 & 39 Vict. c. 55), to isolate patients in hospital, disinfect property and belongings, suspend schooling, and temporarily close businesses.
