= Housing of the Working Classes Act 1890 =

Act of the Parliament of the United Kingdom

Housing of the Working Classes Act 1890 (Note: Section 1.)
- Act of Parliament
- Parliament of the United Kingdom
- Long title: An Act to consolidate and amend the Acts relating to Artizans and Labourers Dwellings and the Housing of the Working Classes.
- Citation: 53 & 54 Vict. c. 70
- Territorial extent: United Kingdom

Dates
- Royal assent: 18 August 1890
- Commencement: 18 August 1890 (Note: The Acts of Parliament (Commencement) Act 1793.)
- Repealed: 1 July 1925 (except section 74(1)); 1 January 1926 (section 74(1))
Other legislation
Amends	See § Repealed enactments
Repeals/revokes	See § Repealed enactments
Amended by	Housing of the Working Classes Act 1894; Housing of the Working Classes Act 1890 Amendment (Scotland) Act 1896; Housing of the Working Classes Act 1900; Housing, Town Planning, &c. Act 1919
Repealed by	England and Wales: Housing Act 1925 and Settled Land Act 1925; Scotland: Housing (Scotland) Act 1925

Status: Repealed

Text of statute as originally enacted

The Housing of the Working Classes Act 1890 (53 & 54 Vict. c. 70) was an act of the Parliament of the United Kingdom.

== Background ==
The act followed the Housing of the Working Classes Act 1885 (48 & 49 Vict. c. 72), which had empowered local authorities to condemn slum housing as a public health measure, but no more. This act extended their powers, allowing them to also purchase the land and finance new housing.

== Provisions ==
The act was made up of four parts and seven schedules:

- Part 1: Unhealthy Areas
- Part 2: Unhealthy Dwellings
- Part 3: Working Class Lodging Houses
- Part 4: Supplemental
- First Schedule: A list of the names of relevant authorities
- Second Schedule: Provisions for compulsory purchase
- Third Schedule: Provisions for closing premises
- Fourth and Fifth Schedule: A collection of forms to be used in applying the act
- Sixth Schedule: Lists required byelaws that authorities need to enact.

=== Repealed enactments ===
Section 102 of the act repealed 15 enactments, listed in the seventh schedule to the act.

Citation	Short title	Description	Extent of repeal
14 & 15 Vict. c. 34	Labouring Classes Lodging Houses Act 1851	The Labouring Classes Lodging Houses Act, 1851.	The whole act.
18 & 19 Vict. c. 88	Dwelling Houses (Scotland) Act 1855	The Dwelling Houses (Scotland) Act, 1855.	The whole act.
29 & 30 Vict. c. 28	Labouring Classes Dwelling Houses Act 1866	The Labouring Classes Dwelling Houses Act, 1866.	The whole act.
29 & 30 Vict. c. 44	Labouring Classes Lodging Houses and Dwellings Act (Ireland) 1866	The Labouring Classes Lodging Houses and Dwellings Act (Ireland), 1866.	The whole act.
30 & 31 Vict. c. 28	Labouring Classes Dwelling Houses Act 1867	The Labouring Classes Dwelling Houses Act, 1867.	The whole act.
31 & 32 Vict. c. 130	Artizans and Labourers Dwellings Act 1868	The Artizans and Labourers Dwellings Act, 1868.	The whole act.
38 & 39 Vict. c. 36	Artisans' and Labourers' Dwellings Improvement Act 1875	The Artizans and Labourers Dwellings Improvement Act, 1875.	The whole act.
38 & 39 Vict. c. 49	Artisans and Labourers Dwellings Improvement (Scotland) Act 1875	The Artizans and Labourers Dwellings Improvement (Scotland) Act, 1875.	The whole act.
42 & 43 Vict. c. 63	Artizans and Labourers Dwellings Improvement Act 1879	The Artizans and Labourers Dwellings Improvement Act, 1879.	The whole act.
42 & 43 Vict. c. 64	Artizans and Labourers Dwellings Act (1868) Amendment Act 1879	The Artizans and Labourers Dwellings Act (1868) Amendment Act, 1879.	The whole act.
42 & 43 Vict. c. 77	Public Works Loans Act 1879	The Public Works Loans Act, 1879.	Section six.
43 Vict. c. 2	Artizans and Labourers Dwellings Improvement (Scotland) Act 1880	The Artizans and Labourers Dwellings Improvement (Scotland) Act, 1880.	The whole act.
43 Vict. c. 8	Artizans' Dwellings Act (1868) Amendment Act (1879) Amendment Act 1880	An Act to explain and amend the twenty-second section of the Artizans and Labourers Dwellings Act (1868) Amendment Act, 1879.	The whole act.
45 & 46 Vict. c. 54	Artizans Dwellings Act 1882	The Artizans Dwellings Act, 1882.	The whole act.
48 & 49 Vict. c. 72	Housing of the Working Classes Act 1885	The Housing of the Working Classes Act, 1885.	The whole act except sections three and seven to nine, and except section ten so far as it relates to byelaws authorised by those sections.

== Implications ==
This gave London County Council the legal power to compulsory buy land out of area and to construct tenements and housing estates. The powers under part 3 were extensive: allowing the council to:

- lease land for the erection thereon of workmen's dwellings
- itself undertake the erection of dwellings or the improvement or reconstruction of existing dwellings
- fit up, furnish and maintain lodging working classes
- make any necessary by-laws and regulations for the management and use of the lodging houses
- sell dwellings or lodging houses established for seven years or upwards under part III of the act whenever such dwellings or lodging houses are deemed by the Council and the Local Government Board to be unnecessary or too expensive to keep up.

== Subsequent developments ==
The Housing of the Working Classes Act 1894 (57 & 58 Vict. c. 55) amended the financial provisions of part 2 of the principal act.

The Housing of the Working Classes Act 1900 (63 & 64 Vict. c. 59) extended these powers to all authorities other than rural district councils.

The whole act, except section 74(1), was repealed for England and Wales by section 136 of, and the sixth schedule to, the Housing Act 1925 (15 & 16 Geo. 5. c. 14), which came into force on 1 July 1925. Section 74(1) was repealed for England and Wales by section 119(1) of, and the fifth schedule to, the Settled Land Act 1925 (c. 18), which came into force on 1 January 1926.

The whole act, so far as unrepealed, was repealed for Scotland by section 120(1) of, and the sixth schedule to, the Housing (Scotland) Act 1925 (15 & 16 Geo. 5. c. 15), which came into force on 1 July 1925.

== See also ==
- Boundary Estate
