= Public Health (London) Act 1891 =

Act of the Parliament of the United Kingdom

Public Health (London) Act 1891 (Note: Section 144.)
- Act of Parliament
- Parliament of the United Kingdom
- Long title: An Act to consolidate and amend the Laws relating to Public Health in London.
- Citation: 54 & 55 Vict. c. 76
- Territorial extent: United Kingdom

Dates
- Royal assent: 5 August 1891
- Commencement: 1 January 1892 (Note: Section 143.)
- Repealed: 1 October 1936
Other legislation
Amends	See § Repealed enactments
Repeals/revokes	See § Repealed enactments
Amended by	Public Health (London) Act 1891 Amendment Act 1893; Public Health Act 1936
Repealed by	Public Health (London) Act 1936

Status: Repealed

Text of statute as originally enacted

The Public Health (London) Act 1891 (54 & 55 Vict. c. 76) was an act of the Parliament of the United Kingdom which extended access to Metropolitan Asylums Board hospitals to those who were not eligible for poor relief.

== Provisions ==
The act transferred responsibility for removing snow from footpaths from individual householders to the London vestries and district boards.

The act required sanitary authorities (the London vestries and district boards) to provide mortuaries. This had previously been a right but was now an obligation.

In a small number of cases, the act was used to provide maternity homes under the Maternity and Child Welfare Act 1918.

=== Repealed enactments ===
Section 142(1) of the act repealed 35 enactments, listed in the fourth schedule to the act.

Section 142(5) of the act provided so much of the Public Health Act 1875 (38 & 39 Vict. c. 55) as re-enacted sections 51 and 52 of the Sanitary Act 1866 (29 & 30 Vict. c. 90) and sections 34–36 of the Public Health Act 1872 (35 & 36 Vict. c. 79) would extend to London.

Citation	Short title	Description	Extent of Repeal
26 Geo. 3. c. 71	Knackers Act 1786	An Act for regulating houses and other places kept for the purpose of slaughtering horses.	The whole act.
57 Geo. 3. c. xxix	Metropolitan Paving Act 1817	An Act for better Paving, Improving, and Regulating the Streets of the Metropolis, and Removing and Preventing Nuisances and Obstructions therein.	Section fifty-seven so far as it relates to a cesspool; sections fifty-nine to sixty-one; section sixty-three; section sixty-four from "or shall throw" to "either of 'such pavements'" as from the coming into operation of any byelaw made for the like object; sections sixty-seven and sixty-eight; and sections seventy-three and seventy-four as from the coming into operation of any byelaw made for the like object.
2 & 3 Vict. c. 47	Metropolitan Police Act 1839	An Act for further improving the police in and near the metropolis.	Section sixty, from "or cause any offensive matter" to "so as to be a common nuisance," as from the coming into operation of any byelaw made for the like object; and from "every occupier of a house" to "reference to this enactment."
7 & 8 Vict. c. 87	Knackers Act 1844	An Act to amend the law for regulating places kept for slaughtering horses.	The whole act.
16 & 17 Vict. c. 128	Smoke Abatement, London Act 1853	An Act to abate the Nuisance arising from the smoke of Furnaces in the Metropolis and from Steam Vessels above London Bridge.	The whole act as respects all places without as well as within London.
18 & 19 Vict. c. 116	Diseases Prevention Act 1855	The Diseases Prevention Act, 1855.	The whole act.
18 & 19 Vict. c. 120	Metropolis Management Act 1855	The Metropolis Management Act, 1855.	Section eighty-one; sections eighty-two to eighty-five, except so far as they relate to a drain or sewer, or any work or apparatus connected therewith; section eighty-six down to "defrayed under this Act"; sections eighty-eight, one hundred and three, and one hundred and four; section one hundred and sixteen from "and also to cause" to the end of the section; sections one hundred and seventeen, and one hundred and twenty-five; section one hundred and twenty-six, as from the coming into operation of any byelaw made for the like object; sections one hundred and twenty-seven to one hundred and twenty-nine, one hundred and thirty-two, one hundred and thirty-three, and one hundred and thirty-four; section one hundred and ninety-eight from "and to every such report" to "for their parish or district"; section two hundred and two from "for the emptying" to "disposing of refuse" as from the coming into operation of any byelaw made for the like object and; section two hundred and eleven so far as regards any watercloset, privy, ashpit, or cesspool.
18 & 19 Vict. c. 121	Nuisances Removal Act for England 1855	The Nuisances Removal Act for England, 1855.	The whole act.
19 & 20 Vict. c. 107	Smoke Abatement, London Act 1856	An Act to amend the Smoke Nuisance Abatement (Metropolis) Act, 1853.	The wholeact as respects all places without as well as within London.
23 & 24 Vict. c. 77	Nuisances Removal Act 1860	An Act to amend the Acts for the Removal of Nuisances and the Prevention of Diseases.	The whole act.
25 & 26 Vict. c. 102	Metropolis Management Amendment Act 1862	The Metropolis Management Amendment Act, 1862.	Sections forty-three and sixty-two; in section sixty-four the word "eighty-first," and the words "and eighty-sixth"; sections sixty-seven, seventy, eighty-nine, ninety-one, ninety-three, ninety-four, and ninety-five and section one hundred and five, from "and all penalties" to "1855."
26 & 27 Vict. c. 117	Nuisances Removal Act for England (Amendment) Act 1863	The Nuisances Removal Act for England (Amendment) Act, 1863.	Thewhole act.
29 & 30 Vict. c. 41	Nuisances Removal Act (No. 1) 1866	The Nuisances Removal (No. 1) Act, 1866.	The whole act.
29 & 30 Vict. c. 90	Sanitary Act 1866	The Sanitary Act, 1866.	The whole act, except section forty-one.
31 & 32 Vict. c. 115	Sanitary Act 1868	The Sanitary Act, 1868.	The whole act.
32 & 33 Vict. c. 100	Sanitary Loans Act 1869	The Sanitary Loans Act, 1869.	The whole act.
33 & 34 Vict. c. 53	Sanitary Act 1870	The Sanitary Act, 1870.	The whole act.
35 & 36 Vict. c. 79	Public Health Act 1872	The Public Health Act, 1872.	The whole act.
37 & 38 Vict. c. 67	Slaughter-houses, &c. (Metropolis) Act 1874	The Slaughterhouses, &c. (Metropolis) Act, 1874.	The whole act.
37 & 38 Vict. c. 89	Sanitary Law Amendment Act 1874	The Sanitary Law Amendment Act, 1874.	The whole act, except so much of sections forty-six and forty-nine as relates to common lodging-houses.
38 & 39 Vict. c. 55	Public Health Act 1875	The Public Health Act, 1875.	Section one hundred and eight from "In this section" to the end of the section; section one hundred and fifteen from "In this section" to the end of the section. Section two hundred and ninety-one, as respects the whole of the Port of London.
41 & 42 Vict. c. 74	Contagious Diseases (Animals) Act 1878	The Contagious Diseases (Animals) Act, 1878.	Section thirty-four.
42 & 43 Vict. c. 54	Poor Law Act 1879	The Poor Law Act, 1879.	Sections fifteen and sixteen.
43 & 44 Vict. c. lix	Local Government Board's Provisional Orders Confirmation (Amersham Union, &c.) Act 1880	The Local Government Board's Provisional Orders Confirmation (Amersham Union, &c.) Act, 1880.	Section two.
46 & 47 Vict. c. 35	Diseases Prevention (Metropolis) Act 1883	The Diseases Prevention (Metropolis) Act, 1883.	The whole act.
46 & 47 Vict. c. 53	Factory and Workshop Act 1883	The Factory and Workshop Act, 1883.	Section seventeen, down to "for the district," being the first two subsections.
47 & 48 Vict. c. 60	Metropolitan Asylum Board (Borrowing Powers) Act 1884	The Metropolitan Asylum Board (Borrowing Powers) Act, 1884.	The whole act.
48 & 49 Vict. c. 72	Housing of the Working Classes Act 1885	The Housing of the Working Classes Act, 1885.	Section seven; and section nine from "This section shall apply" to "sanitary authority," being subsection (6).
49 & 50 Vict. c. 32	Contagious Diseases (Animals) Act 1886	The Contagious Diseases (Animals) Act, 1886.	Section nine.
51 & 52 Vict. c. 41	Local Government Act 1888	The Local Government Act, 1888.	Section forty-five; and section eighty-eight, from "Section one hundred and ninety-one" to the end of the section, being subsection (c).
52 & 53 Vict. c. 56	Poor Law Act 1889	The Poor Law Act, 1889.	Section three, down to "common poor fund," being subsections (1), (2), and (3); and sections six and seven.
52 & 53 Vict. c. 64	Public Health Act 1889	The Public Health Act, 1889.	Section one, from "and as regards" to the end of the section; and in section two the words "or of section fifty-two of the Sanitary Act, 1866."
52 & 53 Vict. c. 72	Infectious Disease (Notification) Act 1889	The Infectious Disease (Notification) Act, 1889.	Section two, from "to every London" down to "Act and" being subsection (a); sections ten and twelve; section sixteen, from "the Commissioners of Sewers" down to "Act, 1887," being subsections (a) and (b); and from "The expression 'London district'" down to "local authority is elected."
53 & 54 Vict. c. 34	Infectious Disease (Prevention) Act 1890	The Infectious Disease (Prevention) Act, 1890.	Section two, from "Local authority" to the end of the section; section three, from "to every London district" to "this Act; and"; and section five, down to "London district, and".
53 & 54 Vict. c. ccxliii	London Council (General Powers) Act 1890	The London Council (General Powers) Act, 1890.	Sections twenty-two and twenty-four.

== Subsequent developments ==
The whole act was repealed by section 308 of, and the seventh schedule to, the Public Health (London) Act 1936 (26 Geo. 5 & 1 Edw. 8. c. 50), which came into force on 1 October 1936.

== See also ==
- Healthcare in London
- Public Health Act
