= Wheeler v JJ Saunders Ltd =

- Court: Court of Appeal of England and Wales
- Full case name: Dr. Graham Edward Wheeler v J.J. Saunders Ltd
- Decided: 19 December 1994
- Citation: [1994] EWCA Civ 32
- Transcript: Bailii transcript

Case history
- Prior action: High Court of Justice

Court membership
- Judges sitting: Staughton LJ; Gibson LJ; Sir John May

Wheeler v JJ Saunders Ltd [1994] EWCA Civ 32 is an English Court of Appeal case on nuisance which amended the precedent set by Gillingham Borough Council v Medway (Chatham) Dock Co Ltd. Wheeler was a veterinary surgeon who owned Kingdown Farm House; the wider farm was owned by J.J. Saunders Ltd, who used it for raising pigs. After Saunders gained planning permission for a pair of pig houses, Wheeler brought an action in nuisance, alleging that the smell of the pigs interfered with his use and enjoyment of the land. When the case went to the Court of Appeal, Saunders argued that the granting of planning permission for the pig houses had changed the nature of the area, as in Gillingham, making the nuisance permissible. The Court of Appeal rejected this argument, holding that a pair of pig houses was not a sufficient development to change the nature of an area; the centre of the Gillingham case had been a commercial dock, which was a sufficient development.

== Facts ==
Wheeler was a veterinary surgeon who owned Kingdown Farm House, near Priddy, with his wife. The farm itself belonged to Kingdown Farm Limited, a company 15 percent owned by Wheeler and 85 percent owned by J.J. Saunders Ltd. The two fell out by March 1988, with Wheeler dismissed from his position as managing director of Kingdown Farm Limited. Between July 1988 and April 1990, J.J. Saunders constructed a pair of pig houses near Kingdown Farm House, which featured a channel to contain the pigs' excrement. Wheeler brought a case on two grounds, the first querying whether he was entitled to an easement allowing him to use one of the two ways to access the farmhouse, which involved going between the farmhouse and farm. The second was a claim in nuisance, Wheeler asserting that the smell of the pigs and their excrement was interfering with his use and enjoyment of the farmhouse.

== Judgment ==
The case was originally sent to the Chancery Division of the High Court of Justice, before being transferred to Bristol District Registry, where Judge Weeks gave his judgment on 24 July 1992, dismissing 6 of the 10 claims made by Wheeler but awarding £2,820 of damages and issuing 3 injunctions. The case was appealed to the Court of Appeal of England and Wales, where it was heard by Staughton LJ, Gibson LJ and Sir John May. The matter of the easement was based on the case of Wheeldon v Burrows, where Thesiger LJ said that easements would be transferred when they were "necessary to the reasonable enjoyment of the property". The Court of Appeal held that the use of this easement was not necessary for the enjoyment of the property.

On the matter of the nuisance, the defendants relied on Gillingham Borough Council v Medway (Chatham) Dock Co Ltd, where it was held that the granting of planning permission had changed the area in such a way that what would previously have been a nuisance was not. The defendants argued that the granting of planning permission for their pig houses authorised the nuisance in line with Gillingham. This argument was rejected by the Court of Appeal, which held that the granting of planning permission for a pair of pig houses did not alter the area in the same way that the granting of planning permission for a commercial dock had in Gillingham.

== See also ==
- Aldred's Case (1610) 77 ER 816

== Bibliography ==
- J.P.L. (1995). "Residential property with adjoining holiday cottages – pig farm on adjacent land". Journal of Planning & Environment Law. 1995 (7). Sweet & Maxwell. ISSN 0307-4870.
- Thompson, M.P. (1995). "Paths and pigs". Conveyancer and Property Lawyer. 1995 (July). Sweet & Maxwell. ISSN 0010-8200.
