= Hunter v Canary Wharf Ltd =

1997 English tort law case

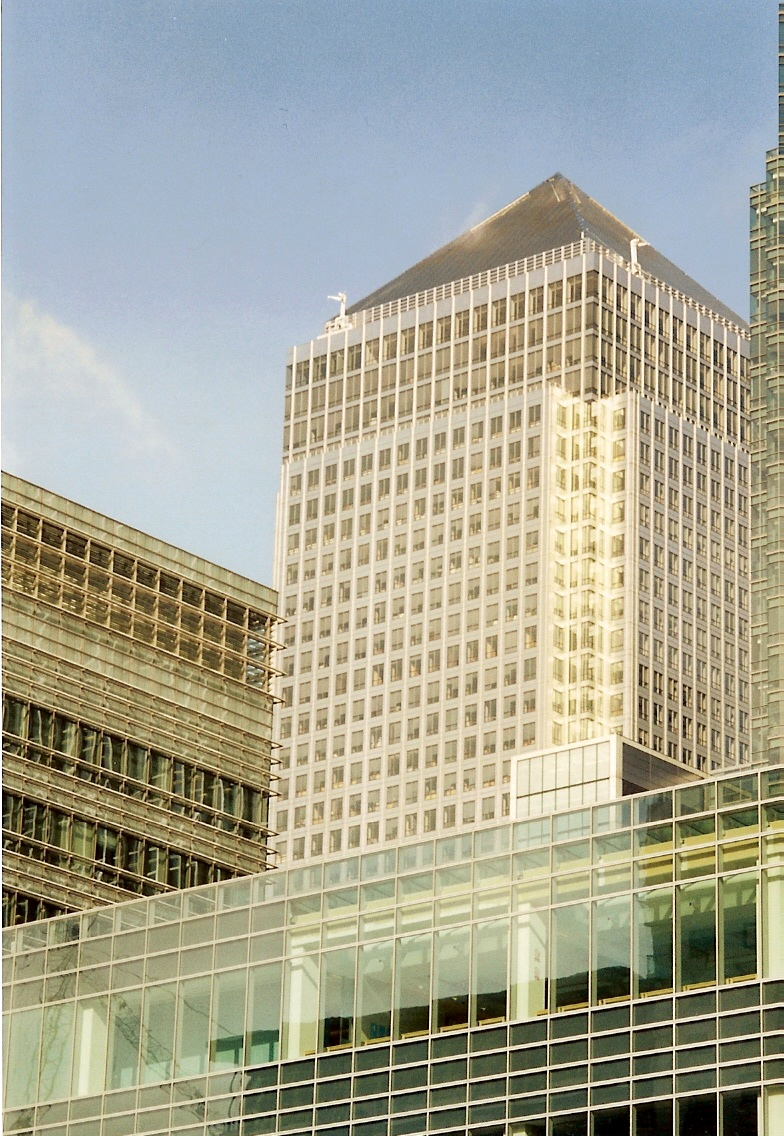
- One Canada Square, the building which triggered this case.
- Court: House of Lords
- Decided: 24 April 1997
- Citations: [1997] UKHL 14, [1997] AC 655, [1997] 2 WLR 684, [1997] 2 All ER 426, [1997] 2 FLR 342, [1997] Fam Law 601

Court membership
- Judges sitting: Lord Goff of Chieveley, Lord Lloyd of Berwick, Lord Hoffmann, Lord Cooke of Thorndon, Lord Hope of Craighead

Keywords
- Nuisance, protected property rights

Hunter v Canary Wharf Ltd [1997] UKHL 14 is an English tort law case on the subject of private nuisance. Several hundred claimants alleged that Canary Wharf Ltd, in constructing One Canada Square, had caused nuisance to them by impairing their television signal. The House of Lords held unanimously that such interference could not amount to an actionable nuisance; the nuisance was equivalent to loss of a view, or of a prospect, which had never previously been actionable.

== Facts ==
Canary Wharf Ltd undertook to construct a large tower (now known as the One Canada Square), for commercial purposes. The tower was completed in November 1990, reaching 250 metres in height, and 50 metres squared in area. However, the tower, being situated less than 10 kilometres from the BBC's primary television transmitter, in Crystal Palace, interfered with the reception of several hundred home owners. It was submitted that before the construction of the tower (in the summer of 1989), television reception had been good. The issue was remedied in April 1991, whereby a broadcast relay was installed in Balfron Tower, to transmit television signal into the area affected. Nevertheless, the claimants alleged that the large metallic structure had interrupted their television reception, and claimed private nuisance – for loss of enjoyment – and remuneration for their wasted television license fee, for the time their signal had been impaired.

== Judgment ==
The judgment of the House of Lords concentrated on two aspects of private nuisance.

The first issue was who could be seen to have a legitimate right in land, a requirement to sue in nuisance. The Lords rejected the interim case of Khorasandjian v Bush, where it had been found that no proprietary interest in a property was required to bring an action. In doing so, they upheld the findings of Malone v Laskey, establishing again that only householders with a right to a property could commence actions in nuisance. The second issue was that, after establishing who could bring an action for nuisance, what rights were protected by the tort. Lord Lloyd in his judgment referred to three areas of private nuisance:

Private nuisances are of three kinds. They are (1) nuisance by encroachment on a neighbour's land; (2) nuisance by direct physical injury to a neighbour's land; and (3) nuisance by interference with a neighbour's quiet enjoyment of his land.

It was pointed out that, as stated in Walter v Selfe, any nuisance must be relatively substantial, and not merely a 'fanciful complaint'. It had been established previously that a drop in the value of land would not necessarily allow an action in nuisance. The issue at hand however was whether it would be fair in the circumstances to impose restrictions upon land owners with regard to their right to build properties.

Lord Goff referred to several authorities in support of the common law standing that merely blocking a property owner's view, airflow, or light, is not actionable. From this, he stated that: "more is required than the mere presence of a neighbouring building to give rise to an actionable private nuisance." On the idea that it would be more desirable to allow nuisance claims from someone without an interest in land, Lord Goff said the following.

would not wish it to be thought that I myself have not consulted the relevant academic writings. I have, of course, done so, as is my usual practice; and it is my practice to refer to those which I have found to be of assistance, but not to refer, critically or otherwise, to those which are not. In the present circumstances, however, I feel driven to say that I found in the academic works which I consulted little more than an assertion of the desirability of extending the right of recovery in the manner favoured by the Court of Appeal in the present case. I have to say (though I say it in no spirit of criticism, because I know full well the limits within which writers of textbooks on major subjects must work) that I have found no analysis of the problem; and, in circumstances such as this, a crumb of analysis is worth a loaf of opinion. Some writers have uncritically commended the decision of the Court of Appeal in Khorasandjian v Bush [1993] QB 727, without reference to the misunderstanding in Motherwell v Motherwell 73 DLR (3d) 62, on which the Court of Appeal relied, or consideration of the undesirability of making a fundamental change to the tort of private nuisance to provide a partial remedy in cases of individual harassment. For these and other reasons, I did not, with all respect, find the stream of academic authority referred to by my noble and learned friend to be of assistance in the present case.

Whilst it was agreed upon that there had been no actionable nuisance in the instant case, the Lords differed in their interpretations of whether an interference to television reception could constitute a nuisance. Lord Cooke found that an interference by a building could amount to a nuisance, if it was unreasonable, or a misuse of the defendant's land; Lord Hoffmann and Lord Hope however stated that as the right to television reception is not obtained, interference with it could not amount to a nuisance:

On the one hand, therefore, we have a rule of common law which, absent easements, entitles an owner of land to build what he likes upon his land. It has stood for many centuries. If an exception were to be created for large buildings which interfere with television reception, the developers would be exposed to legal action by an indeterminate number of plaintiffs, each claiming compensation in a relatively modest amount. Defending such actions, whatever their merits or demerits, would hardly be cost-effective. The compensation and legal fees would form an unpredictable additional cost of the building. On the other hand, the plaintiffs will ordinarily have been able to make their complaints at the planning stage of the development and, if necessary, secure whatever conditions were necessary to provide them with an alternative source of television signals. The interference in such a case is not likely to last very long because there is no technical difficulty about the solution. In my view the case for a change in the law is not made out.

== Significance ==
"Ought this inconvenience to be considered in fact as more than fanciful, more than one of mere delicacy or fastidiousness, as an inconvenience materially interfering with the ordinary comfort physically of human existence, not merely according to the elegant or dainty modes and habits of living, but according to the plain and sober and simple notions among the English people?"
Walter v Selfe (1851)

Before Hunter it had been judicially stated in Bridlington Relay v Yorkshire Electricity Board that it was not thought interference to television reception could give rise to an actionable nuisance, by Buckley J:

For myself, however, I do not think that it can at present be said that the ability to receive television free from occasional, even if recurrent and severe, electrical interference is so important a part of an ordinary householder's enjoyment of his property that such interference should be regarded as a legal nuisance, particularly, perhaps, if such interference affects only one of the available alternative programmes.

However, these remarks had been made obiter dicta, and thus held no judicial authority. The legal basis on which a complaint of television reception was considered to take place was that of loss of a view, or prospect.

== See also ==
- Nuisance in English law
- Privacy in English law
- English tort law
