= Nuisances Removal Act for England 1855 =

Act of the Parliament of the United Kingdom

Nuisances Removal Act for England 1855 (Note: Section 46.)
- Act of Parliament
- Parliament of the United Kingdom
- Long title: An Act to consolidate and amend the Nuisances Removal and Diseases Prevention Acts, 1848 and 1849.
- Citation: 18 & 19 Vict. c. 121
- Territorial extent: United Kingdom

Dates
- Royal assent: 14 August 1855
- Commencement: 14 August 1855 (Note: The Acts of Parliament (Commencement) Act 1793.)
- Repealed: 1 January 1892
Other legislation
Repeals/revokes	See § Repealed enactments
Amended by	Nuisances Removal Act 1860; Nuisances Removal Act for England (Amendment) Act 1863; Nuisances Removal Act (No. 1) 1866; Public Health Act 1875; Public Health (Ireland) Act 1878
Repealed by	Public Health (London) Act 1891

Status: Repealed

Text of statute as originally enacted

The Nuisances Removal Act for England 1855 (18 & 19 Vict. c. 121) was an act of the Parliament of the United Kingdom that consolidated enactments related to nuisances and the prevention of diseases in England.

== Provisions ==
=== Repealed enactments ===
Section 1 of the act repealed 2 enactments, listed in that section, as far as they related to England. The repeal did not affect proceedings commenced or taken under the repealed acts and not yet completed, which could be proceeded with under those acts, and contracts or works undertaken by virtue of the repealed acts continued to be as effectual as if those acts had not been repealed.

Citation	Short title	Description	Extent of repeal
11 & 12 Vict. c. 123	Nuisances Removal and Diseases Prevention Act 1848	An Act to renew and amend an Act of the Tenth Year of Her present Majesty, for the more speedy Removal of certain Nuisances, and the Prevention of contagious and epidemic Diseases.	The whole act as it applies to England.
12 & 13 Vict. c. 111	Nuisances Removal and Diseases Prevention Amendment Act 1849	An Act to amend the Nuisances Removal and Diseases Prevention Act, 1848.	The whole act as it applies to England.

== Subsequent developments ==
The whole act was repealed, except so far as it related to the metropolis, by section 343 of, and the fifth schedule to, the Public Health Act 1875 (38 & 39 Vict. c. 55), which came into force on 11 August 1875.

The whole act was repealed by section 142(1) of, and the fourth schedule to, the Public Health (London) Act 1891 (54 & 55 Vict. c. 76), which came into force on 1 January 1892.
