= Public Health (London) Act 1936 =

Act of the Parliament of the United Kingdom

Public Health (London) Act 1936 (Note: Section 309(1).)
- Act of Parliament
- Parliament of the United Kingdom
- Long title: An Act to consolidate certain enactments relating to public health in London.
- Citation: 26 Geo. 5 & 1 Edw. 8. c. 50
- Territorial extent: County of London (Note: Section 309(2).)

Dates
- Royal assent: 31 July 1936
- Commencement: 1 October 1936 (Note: Section 309(1).)
- Repealed: 1 April 1965
Other legislation
Amends	See § Repealed enactments
Repeals/revokes	See § Repealed enactments
Amended by	Factories Act 1937; Food and Drugs Act 1938; London Government Act 1939; Local Government Act 1948; National Assistance Act 1948; Justices of the Peace Act 1949; Magistrates' Courts Act 1952; Children Act 1958; Charities Act 1960; Nursing Homes Act 1963
Repealed by	London Government Act 1963

Status: Repealed

Text of statute as originally enacted

The Public Health (London) Act 1936 (26 Geo. 5 & 1 Edw. 8. c. 50) was an act of the Parliament of the United Kingdom that consolidated legislation related to public health in London.

== Provisions ==
The act contained provisions designed to deal with smoke, but these provisions were conditional on proving that the smoke was a nuisance.

=== Repealed enactments ===
Section 308 of the act repealed 82 enactments listed in the seventh schedule to the act.

Citation	Short title	Description	Extent of repeal
57 Geo. 3. c. xxix	Metropolitan Paving Act 1817	An Act for better paving, improving and regulating the streets of the Metropolis, and removing and preventing nuisances and obstructions therein.	Sections fifty-seven, sixty-two and seventy-seven.
2 & 3 Vict. c. 71	Metropolitan Police Courts Act 1839	The Metropolitan Police Courts Act, 1839.	Section forty-one.
9 & 10 Vict. c. 74	Baths and Washhouses Act 1846	The Baths and Washhouses Act, 1846.	The whole act except so far as it applies to the city.
10 & 11 Vict. c. 61	Baths and Washhouses Act 1847	The Baths and Washhouses Act, 1847.	The whole act except so far as it applies to the city.
14 & 15 Vict. c. 28	Common Lodging Houses Act 1851	The Common Lodging Houses Act, 1851.	The whole act.
16 & 17 Vict. c. 41	Common Lodging Houses Act 1853	The Common Lodging Houses Act, 1853.	The whole act.
18 & 19 Vict. c. 120	Metropolis Management Act 1855	The Metropolis Management Act, 1855.	Sections sixty-eight to seventy-six; sections seventy-eight to eighty; sections eighty-two to eighty-seven; section eighty-nine; in section ninety-two the words “watering, cleansing,”; in section one hundred the words from “and lay” to “a drain, channel, or gutter,” the words “and drain, channel, or gutter” and the words “or do not lay down therein such drain, channel, or gutter”; section one hundred and sixteen; section one hundred and thirty-five; sections one hundred and thirty-seven and one hundred and thirty-eight; in section one hundred and forty the words “watering and cleansing,” the words “or for the purposes of sewerage and drainage” and the words from “and it shall also be lawful” to the end of the section; in section one hundred and fifty the words from “and also to contract for the purchase” to “obstruction of sewerage or drainage” and the words “of cleansing sewers and drains and the other purposes”; in section one hundred and fifty-two the words from “save for enabling” to the end of the section; section one hundred and fifty-three; in section two hundred and two the words from “and for regulating the dimensions” to “proceeding thereon”; sections two hundred and four and two hundred and five; sections two hundred and eleven and two hundred and twelve; in section two hundred and thirty-seven the words “to all the provisions of this Act relating to sewerage and house drainage and”; in section two hundred and forty the words “to all the provisions of this Act relating to sewerage and house drainage, and”; in section two hundred and fifty the words from “except for the purpose” to the word “compulsorily” and the words from “the word ‘drain’” to the end of the section; and Schedule (D).
21 & 22 Vict. c. 104	Metropolis Management Amendment Act 1858	The Metropolis Management Amendment Act, 1858.	The whole act.
25 & 26 Vict. c. 102	Metropolis Management Amendment Act 1862	The Metropolis Management Amendment Act, 1862.	Sections twenty-one and twenty-two; sections twenty-four and twenty-five; sections twenty-seven to twenty-nine; section thirty-two; sections forty-four to sixty-one; sections sixty-three and sixty-four; section sixty-six; sections sixty-eight and sixty-nine; in section eighty-one the words “or draining”; section eighty-three; in section eighty-four the word “sewerage”; in section eighty-six the words “sewerage, drainage” and the words from “of constructing” to “therein or”; section eighty-eight; in section one hundred and twelve the words from “the word ‘drain’” to the words “Commissioners of Sewers.”
29 & 30 Vict. c. 90	Sanitary Act 1866	The Sanitary Act, 1866.	Section forty-one.
30 & 31 Vict. c. 134	Metropolitan Streets Act 1867	The Metropolitan Streets Act, 1867	Section five.
34 & 35 Vict. c. 113	Metropolis Water Act 1871	The Metropolis Water Act, 1871	Section thirty-three.
37 & 38 Vict. c. 89	Sanitary Law Amendment Act 1874	The Sanitary Law Amendment Act, 1874	Sections forty-six and forty-nine.
38 & 39 Vict. c. 55	Public Health Act 1875	The Public Health Act, 1875	In section one hundred and eight the words from “any nuisance authority” to “or by”; in section one hundred and fifteen the words from “any nuisance authority” to “or by”.
41 & 42 Vict. c. 14	Baths and Washhouses Act 1878	The Baths and Wash-houses Act, 1878	The following provisions, except so far as they apply to the city, that is to say:—in section one, the words from “The words” to the end of the section; sections two to four; sections nine to eleven; sections thirteen and fourteen; and the Schedule.
42 & 43 Vict. c. cxcviii	Metropolis Management (Thames River Prevention of Floods) Amendment Act 1879	The Metropolis Management (Thames River Prevention of Floods) Amendment Act, 1879	Section forty-three.
45 & 46 Vict. c. 30	Baths and Wash Houses Act 1882	The Baths and Wash-houses Act, 1882	The whole act except so far as it applies to the city.
51 & 52 Vict. c. 41	Local Government Act 1888	The Local Government Act, 1888	Sections seventeen and eighteen.
52 & 53 Vict. c. 11	Sale of Horseflesh, &c. Regulation Act 1889	The Sale of Horseflesh, &c., Regulation Act, 1889	The whole act.
53 & 54 Vict. c. 66	Metropolis Management Amendment Act 1890	The Metropolis Management Amendment Act, 1890	Sections four and five; and in section eight the words “Except so far as relates to any sewers vested in the Council.”
53 & 54 Vict. c. ccxliii	London Council (General Powers) Act 1890	The London Council (General Powers) Act, 1890	Section thirty-nine.
54 & 55 Vict. c. 76	Public Health (London) Act 1891	The Public Health (London) Act, 1891	The whole act.
56 & 57 Vict. c. 47	Public Health (London) Act 1891 Amendment Act 1893	The Public Health (London) Act, 1891, Amendment Act, 1893	The whole act.
56 & 57 Vict. c. ccxxi	London County Council (General Powers) Act 1893	The London County Council (General Powers) Act, 1893	Sections thirteen, twenty-three and twenty-five.
57 & 58 Vict. c. cxxiv	Local Government Board's Provisional Orders Confirmation (No. 12) Act 1894	The Local Government Board's Provisional Orders Confirmation (No. 12) Act, 1894	In the Schedule, the County of London (Common Lodging Houses) Order, 1894.
57 & 58 Vict. c. ccxii	London County Council (General Powers) Act 1894	The London County Council (General Powers) Act, 1894	In the preamble, the third recital; and Part IV.
59 & 60 Vict. c. 59	Baths and Washhouses Act 1896	The Baths and Wash-houses Act, 1896	The whole act except so far as it applies to the city.
59 & 60 Vict. c. clxxxviii	London County Council (General Powers) Act 1896	The London County Council (General Powers) Act, 1896	Section thirty-two.
60 & 61 Vict. c. 31	Cleansing of Persons Act 1897	The Cleansing of Persons Act, 1897	The whole act.
60 & 61 Vict. c. cclii	London County Council (General Powers) Act 1897	The London County Council (General Powers) Act, 1897	In the preamble, the seventh recital, and section fifty.
62 & 63 Vict. c. 14	London Government Act 1899	The London Government Act, 1899	In section five, subsection (1); in section six, subsection (4); in section thirty-four the words “the Baths and Wash-houses Acts, 1846 to 1896”; in the Second Schedule, Part I.
62 & 63 Vict. c. 15	Metropolis Management Acts Amendment (Byelaws) Act 1899	The Metropolis Management Acts Amendment (Byelaws) Act, 1899	Section two; in section three the words “of the byelaws under this Act, and”; and the Schedule except so far as it relates to byelaws under Section 202 of the Metropolis Management Act, 1855, for regulating the material of the pavement and roadway of new streets and roads.
1 Edw. 7 c. 22	Factory and Workshop Act 1901	The Factory and Workshop Act, 1901	In section one hundred and one, subsection (5).
2 Edw. 7 c. clxxiii	London County Council (General Powers) Act 1902	The London County Council (General Powers) Act, 1002	In the preamble the tenth and eleventh recitals; Parts VIII and IX; and the Schedule.
3 Edw. 7 c. clxxxvii	London County Council (General Powers) Act 1903	The London County Council (General Powers) Act, 1903	In the preamble, the seventh recital; and Part VIII.
4 Edw. 7 c. ccxliv	London County Council (General Powers) Act 1904	The London County Council (General Powers) Act, 1904	In the preamble, the third, tenth and eleventh recitals; in section three the definition of the expression “the Corporation”; Part IV; sections forty-seven and forty-eight, and subsections (3) and (4) of section fifty-four.
7 Edw. 7 c. 40	Notification of Births Act 1907	The Notification of Births Act, 1907	In section one, subsection (6); in section two, in subsection (4) the words from “including the council” to “common council assembled,” and subsection (5).
7 Edw. 7 c. clxxv	London County Council (General Powers) Act 1907	The London County Council (General Powers) Act, 1907	In section three, in subsection (2), the definitions of the expressions “tenement house” and “working class”; Part V; sections seventy-eight and seventy-nine.
8 Edw. 7 c. 67	Children Act 1908	The Children Act, 1908	The whole act.
8 Edw. 7 c. cvii	London County Council (General Powers) Act 1908	The London County Council (General Powers) Act, 1908	In the preamble, the second recital; in section three the definitions of the expressions “the corporation”, “sanitary authority”, “daily penalty”, “rag and bone dealer”, “tenement house,” and “working class”; Part II; section seventy-five; and subsections (3) and (4) of section seventy-nine.
9 Edw. 7 c. 17	Metropolitan Ambulances Act 1909	The Metropolitan Ambulances Act, 1909	The whole act.
9 Edw. 7 c. 44	Housing, Town Planning, etc. Act 1909	The Housing, Town Planning, &c. Act, 1909	In section sixty-eight, subsection (4); and in section seventy the words “except subsection (4) of section sixty-eight” and the words from “and, in the application” to the end of the section.
9 Edw. 7 c. cxxx	London County Council (General Powers) Act 1909	The London County Council (General Powers) Act, 1909	In section three the definitions of the expressions “the corporation,” “sanitary authority,” “daily penalty,” “tenement house,” and “working class”; Part III; sections fifty-eight, fifty-nine and sixty-six; and subsections (3) and (4) of section seventy.
10 Edw. 7 & 1 Geo. 5 c. cxxix	London County Council (General Powers) Act 1910	The London County Council (General Powers) Act, 1910	In the preamble, the third recital; in section four, the definitions of the expressions “sanitary authority,” and “the Act of 1891”; and Part IV.
1 & 2 Geo. 5 c. 52	Rag Flock Act 1911	The Rag Flock Act, 1911	In section one, subsections (1) to (5), in subsection (6) paragraphs (a) and (b) and in paragraph (c) the words “any other sanitary authority, namely,” and subsection (7).
1 & 2 Geo. 5 c. 55	National Insurance Act 1911	The National Insurance Act, 1911	Section sixty-four.
1 & 2 Geo. 5 c. lxiii	London County Council (General Powers) Act 1911	The London County Council (General Powers) Act, 1911	In the preamble, in the seventh recital the words “public lavatories, sanitary conveniences, and”; in section thirteen, in subsection (1) the words “lavatories, sanitary conveniences and” and the words from “and may make” to the end of the subsection, subsections (2) and (3), in subsection (4) the words “lavatories, “sanitary conveniences, “and”, in subsection (5) the words “lavatories, “sanitary conveniences “and”, and subsections (7) to (9); and section fifteen.
3 & 4 Geo. 5 c. 23	Public Health (Prevention and Treatment of Disease) Act 1913	The Public Health (Prevention and Treatment of Disease) Act, 1913	Sections two to four.
3 & 4 Geo. 5 c. ci	London County Council (General Powers) Act 1913	The London County Council (General Powers) Act, 1913	In the preamble, the third recital; and section fifteen.
5 & 6 Geo. 5 c. 64	Notification of Births (Extension) Act 1915	The Notification of Births (Extension) Act, 1915	Section one.
5 & 6 Geo. 5 c. 66	Milk and Dairies (Consolidation) Act 1915	The Milk and Dairies (Consolidation) Act, 1915	In section twenty, subsections (1) and (4); and in the Fifth Schedule the words “and the Public Health (London) Act, 1891” and the words “The Public Health (London) Act, 1891, sections sixty-nine and seventy-one.”
5 & 6 Geo. 5 c. ciii	London County Council (General Powers) Act 1915	The London County Council (General Powers) Act, 1915	In section sixty-four, the word “sewering.”
6 & 7 Geo. 5 c. 12	Local Government (Emergency Provisions) Act 1916	The Local Government (Emergency Provisions) Act, 1916	Section five.
8 & 9 Geo. 5 c. 29	Maternity and Child Welfare Act 1918	The Maternity and Child Welfare Act, 1918	Sections one and two, and in section three the words from “and the purposes” to “1891.”
9 & 10 Geo. 5 c. 21	Ministry of Health Act 1919	The Ministry of Health Act, 1919	In section three, in subsection (1), paragraph (f).
10 & 11 Geo. 5 c. lxxxix	London County Council (General Powers) Act 1920	The London County Council (General Powers) Act, 1920	In the preamble, the first recital; and Part II.
11 & 12 Geo. 5 c. 12	Public Health (Tuberculosis) Act 1921	The Public Health (Tuberculosis) Act, 1921	Sections one, two, three and six.
11 & 12 Geo. 5 c. 23	Public Health (Officers) Act 1921	The Public Health (Officers) Act, 1921	In section seven, subsection (1), and in subsection (2) the words “Save as provided by this section”; and in section nine the words “except so far as it relates to the administrative county of London.”
12 & 13 Geo. 5 c. lxii	London County Council (General Powers) Act 1922	The London County Council (General Powers) Act, 1922	In the preamble, the second and third recitals; in section four the definitions of “sanitary authority,” “district,” “house,” “owner,” “rack rent” and “vermin”; Part III; and subsection (2) of section nineteen.
15 & 16 Geo. 5 c. 14	Housing Act 1925	The Housing Act, 1925	In section six, in subsection (2) the words from “and as soon as” to the end of the subsection.
15 & 16 Geo. 5 c. 71	Public Health Act 1925	The Public Health Act, 1925	In section two, in subsection (1) the words “save as expressly provided in this Act,” and in subsection (4) the words “inclusive of the administrative county of London”; and in subsection (3) of section eighty-seven the words “proviso (a) or (c) to section two of the Baths and Washhouses Act, 1896, or”.
15 & 16 Geo. 5 c. 76	Expiring Laws Act 1925	The Expiring Laws Act, 1925	In Part I of the First Schedule, in column 3, the words “Section five, except paragraph (a)”.
15 & 16 Geo. 5 c. cxix	London County Council (General Powers) Act 1925	The London County Council (General Powers) Act, 1925	In subsection (1) of section thirty-four the words from “the sewering” to “at large or”.
16 & 17 Geo. 5 c. 43	Public Health (Smoke Abatement) Act 1926	The Public Health (Smoke Abatement) Act, 1926	In section one, subsections (2), (3) and (4); in section two, subsections (1) and (2), and in subsection (3) the words “and of the Public Health (London) Act, 1891, as the case may be”; in section three the words “section twenty-four of the Public Health (London) Act, 1891”; in section five the words “and of the London County Council under section one hundred and sixty-four of the London Building Act, 1894”; sections eight, ten and eleven; in section twelve, in subsection (1) the words “except so far as it relates to London” and the words from “and the Public Health (London) Act, 1891” to the end of the subsection, and in subsection (2) the words “and the other provisions of this Act in their application to London shall be construed as one with the Public Health (London) Act, 1891” and the words from “Provided that” to the end of the subsection.
16 & 17 Geo. 5 c. 48	Births and Deaths Registration Act 1926	The Births and Deaths Registration Act, 1926	In section nine, paragraph (b).
16 & 17 Geo. 5 c. xiv	Hackney Borough Council Act 1926	The Hackney Borough Council Act, 1926	In section fifty-two, in subsection (1), the words “or into any sewer or gully therein” and the words “or choke up such sewer or gully”; and section fifty-five.
16 & 17 Geo. 5 c. xcviii	London County Council (General Powers) Act 1926	The London County Council (General Powers) Act, 1926	Sections forty-two, forty-four and forty-five.
17 & 18 Geo. 5 c. 38	Nursing Homes Registration Act 1927	The Nursing Homes Registration Act, 1927	The whole Act.
17 & 18 Geo. 5 c. xxii	London County Council (General Powers) Act 1927	The London County Council (General Powers) Act, 1927	In section three the definition of the expression “the corporation”; sections fifty-two to fifty-five; section sixty-one; and subsection (2) of section sixty-seven.
18 & 19 Geo. 5 c. 39	Rag Flock Act (1911) Amendment Act 1928	The Rag Flock Act (1911) Amendment Act, 1928	The whole Act.
18 & 19 Geo. 5 c. lxxvii	London County Council (General Powers) Act 1928	The London County Council (General Powers) Act, 1928	In the preamble, the second recital; in section three the definitions of the expressions “the corporation” and “the overseers”, in the definition of the expression “the town clerk” the words “of the City of London or”, and the definitions of the expressions “sanitary authority”, “medical officer” and “the district”; Parts III and IV; section thirty-two; in subsection (1) of section thirty-eight the words “or into any sewer or gully therein” and the words “or choke up such sewer or gully”; in section sixty the words “the corporation or the overseers or” in each place where those words occur; in section sixty-one the words from “Medical” to “drains”; in subsection (1) of section sixty-three the words “the corporation or” where those words first occur, the words “of the corporation or”, and the words “as the case may be”; in section sixty-five the words “the corporation or the overseers or”, wherever those words occur, and the words “as the case may be”; in section sixty-six the words “the corporation or the overseers or” wherever those words occur; and subsections (2) and (4) of section seventy.
19 & 20 Geo. 5 c. 17	Local Government Act 1929	The Local Government Act, 1929	Subsections (1) and (2) of section fourteen; section sixteen; in section eighteen, paragraph (d), in paragraph (e) the words “under the Public Health (London) Act, 1891”, and in paragraph (f) the words from “any expenses” to “Council and”; in section fifty-nine, in subsection (1), the words “and the Public Health (London) Act, 1891” and subsection (2); in the Third Schedule, paragraph 3; and in the Tenth Schedule, in paragraph 26, sub-paragraph (a).
19 & 20 Geo. 5 c. lxxxvii	London County Council (General Powers) Act 1929	The London County Council (General Powers) Act, 1929	Section sixty and the Third Schedule.
20 & 21 Geo. 5 c. clix	London County Council (General Powers) Act 1930	The London County Council (General Powers) Act, 1930	In subsection (2) of section seventeen the words from “The Baths and Washhouses Act, 1896” to “swimming baths”; and sections fifty-four and sixty-two.
22 & 23 Geo. 5 c. 28	Public Health (Cleansing of Shell-fish) Act 1932	The Public Health (Cleansing of Shell-fish) Act, 1932	Section one, so far as it confers powers on the county council or a sanitary authority; in section four, in subsection (2) the words from “and the Public Health (London) Acts” to the end of the subsection; and in subsection (3) the words from “and, in its application to London” to the end of the subsection.
22 & 23 Geo. 5 c. 46	Children and Young Persons Act 1932	The Children and Young Persons Act, 1932	Part V; sections seventy-seven and eighty-seven; and the Second Schedule.
22 & 23 Geo. 5 c. lxx	London County Council (General Powers) Act 1932	The London County Council (General Powers) Act, 1932	Part II; sections eighteen to twenty; and subsections (2) to (4) of section twenty-four.
23 & 24 Geo. 5 c. 12	Children and Young Persons Act 1933	The Children and Young Persons Act, 1933	In section ninety-eight, in subsection (1), the words “or under Part I of the Children Act, 1908.”
23 & 24 Geo. 5 c. xxviii	London County Council (General Powers) Act 1933	The London County Council (General Powers) Act, 1933	Section sixty-six.
24 & 25 Geo. 5 c. xl	London County Council (General Powers) Act 1934	The London County Council (General Powers) Act, 1934	In section twenty-seven, subsection (5).
25 & 26 Geo. 5 c. xxxiii	London County Council (General Powers) Act 1935	The London County Council (General Powers) Act, 1935	In section three, in subsection (1), the definition of “the common council”; section sixty-seven; and in section seventy, the words “or other sanitary authority”; and in section seventy-five, subsections (2) and (4).
26 Geo. 5 & 1 Edw. 8 c. lx	London County Council (General Powers) Act 1936	The London County Council (General Powers) Act, 1936	Section forty-three.

== Subsequent developments ==
The whole act was repealed by schedule 18 to the London Government Act 1963, which came into force on 1 April 1965.
