= Artisans' and Labourers' Dwellings Improvement Act 1875 =

Act of the Parliament of the United Kingdom

Artisans and Labourers Dwellings Improvement Act 1875 (Note: Section 1.)
- Act of Parliament
- Parliament of the United Kingdom
- Long title: An Act for facilitating the Improvement of the Dwellings of the Working Classes in Large Towns.
- Citation: 38 & 39 Vict. c. 36
- Territorial extent: United Kingdom

Dates
- Royal assent: 29 June 1875
- Commencement: 29 June 1875 (Note: The Acts of Parliament (Commencement) Act 1793.)
- Repealed: 18 August 1890
Other legislation
Repealed by	Housing of the Working Classes Act 1890

Status: Repealed

Text of statute as originally enacted

The Artisans' and Labourers' Dwellings Improvement Act 1875 (38 & 39 Vict. c. 36), also known as the Cross Act, was an act of the Parliament of the United Kingdom designed by Richard Cross, Home Secretary during Prime Minister Benjamin Disraeli's second Conservative Government, which involved allowing local councils to buy up areas of slum dwellings in order to clear and then rebuild them. It formed part of Disraeli's social reform initiative aimed at the "elevation of the people" (the working class), a policy stated in his 1872 speeches at Manchester and Crystal Palace, and associated with his doctrine of One Nation Conservatism. Also, key individuals, such as the philanthropist Octavia Hill, helped pressurise the government into passing the act.

== Terms ==
1. Compel owners of slum dwelling to sell to councils, who must provide compensation.
2. Take advantage of lower than normal interest rates from the government.
3. Demolish the areas of slum housing to be redeveloped by commercial builders.

== Importance ==
Considered one of the most significant acts of Disraeli's administration (he said it was their "chief measure") the act was a classic example of permissive legislation that typified Disraeli's social policy. Councils were not compelled to take action and, due to the obvious cost involved, few did. In fact, by 1881, only 10 out of 87 towns in England and Wales used their permitted powers. The most notable major redevelopment occurred in Birmingham under the prominent, radical Liberal Member of Parliament, Joseph Chamberlain, founder of the National Liberal Federation. There, it led to the creation of Corporation Street; overall, however, it proved ineffective.

== Permissiveness ==
The act was permissive, mainly for the protection of property rights. Many felt the act was an infringement of such rights, including many within the party, who pressured Richard Cross against making it compulsory. Also, it may have been seen to be an attack on landlords, traditional Tory voters. As well, it was passed in a time that the government adopted a predominantly laissez-faire attitude to politics. Disraeli proclaimed in June 1875: "Permissive legislation is the characteristic of a free people".

== Subsequent developments ==
The whole act was repealed by section 102 of, and the seventh schedule to, the Housing of the Working Classes Act 1890 (53 & 54 Vict. c. 70), which came into force on 18 August 1890.

== See also ==
- Back-to-back houses

== Bibliography ==
- Glen, Alexander. The Artizans' and Labourers' Dwellings Improvement Act, 1875: With Introduction, Notes, Appendix of Statutes and Forms, and Index. Re-issued with the Artizans' and Labourers' Dwellings Improvement Act, 1879. Knight & Co. Fleet Street, London. 1880. Google Books.
- Paterson, William. "Artisans Dwellings Act". The Practical Statutes of the Session 1875. Law Times Office. Wellington Street, Strand, London. 1875. Pages 147 to 180.
- "Artisans Dwellings" in "Abstracts of Important Acts of Parliament". Companion to the Almanac, or, Year-Book of General Information for the Year 1876. (The British Almanac). Printed for the Company of Stationers. London. 1876. Pages 243 and 244.
