= Sanitary Act 1866 =

Act of the Parliament of the United Kingdom

Sanitary Act 1866 (Note: Section 1.)
- Act of Parliament
- Parliament of the United Kingdom
- Long title: An Act to amend the Law relating to the Public Health.
- Citation: 29 & 30 Vict. c. 90
- Territorial extent: United Kingdom

Dates
- Royal assent: 7 August 1866
- Commencement: 7 August 1866 (Note: The Acts of Parliament (Commencement) Act 1793.)
- Repealed: 1 October 1936
Other legislation
Amends	See § Repealed enactments
Repeals/revokes	See § Repealed enactments
Amended by	Public Health (Scotland) Act 1867; Sanitary Act 1868; Sanitary Act 1870; Public Health Act 1872; Sanitary Act 1866, Ireland, Amendment Act 1873; Public Health Act 1875; Statute Law Revision Act 1875; Factory and Workshop Act 1878; Public Health (Ireland) Act 1878; Coroners Act 1887; Public Health (London) Act 1891
Repealed by	Public Health (London) Act 1936
Relates to	Sanitary Loans Act 1869

Status: Repealed

Text of statute as originally enacted

The Sanitary Act 1866 (29 & 30 Vict. c. 90), sometimes called the Public Health Act 1866, was an act of the Parliament of the United Kingdom. The act allowed the formation of drainage districts and enabled the provision of better house drainage. The second part of the act dealt with nuisances and stated that it was the duty of councils to locate nuisances and remove them.

== Provisions ==
=== Repealed enactments ===
Section 69 of the act repealed 4 enactments, listed in the second schedule to the act.

Citation	Short title	Description	Extent of repeal
58 Geo. 3. c. 47	Hospitals (Ireland) Act 1818	Local Boards of Health Act for Ireland, 1818.	Sections 10 to 15 inclusive.
59 Geo. 3. c. 41	Contagious Diseases (Ireland) Act 1819	Officers of Health Act for Ireland, 1819.	The whole act.
11 & 12 Vict. c. 123	Nuisances Removal and Diseases Prevention Act 1848	Nuisance Removal and Disease Prevention Act, 1848.	The whole act.
12 & 13 Vict. c. 111	Nuisances Removal and Diseases Prevention Act 1849	Nuisance Removal and Disease Prevention Act, 1849.	The whole act.

== Subsequent developments ==
From and after 1 November 1867, the act, so far as it applied to Scotland, was repealed by section 2 of the Public Health (Scotland) Act 1867 (30 & 31 Vict. c. 101), which came into force on 1 November 1867.

The act was amended by the Sanitary Act 1868 (31 & 32 Vict. c. 115), and the Sanitary Act 1870 (33 & 34 Vict. c. 53).

Section 4 of the act was repealed by section 14 of the Public Health Act 1872 (35 & 36 Vict. c. 79), which came into force on 10 August 1872. Glen said that the effect of this was that "the town council, as far as regards appointments of committees for purposes of the Sanitary Acts, must proceed under the Municipal Corporation Acts, or under" section 36 of the Public Health Act 1848 (11 & 12 Vict. c. 63).

Parts I, II and III, except so far as related to the Metropolis or to Scotland or Ireland, were repealed by section 343 of, and part I of schedule V to, the Public Health Act 1875 (38 & 39 Vict. c. 55), which came into force on 11 August 1875.

The words "not already under the operation of any general Act for the regulation of factories or bakehouses" (so far as unrepealed) in section 19 of the act were repealed by section 107 of, and the sixth schedule to, the Factory and Workshop Act 1878 (41 & 42 Vict. c. 16), which came into force on 1 January 1879.

The whole act, so far as it related to Ireland, was repealed by sections 279 and 294 of, and schedule A to, the Public Health (Ireland) Act 1878 (41 & 42 Vict. c. 52), which came into force on 8 August 1878.

The whole act, except section 41, was repealed by section 142(1) of, and the fourth schedule to, the Public Health (London) Act 1891 (54 & 55 Vict. c. 76), which came into force on 1 January 1892.

Section 41 of the act was repealed by section 308 of, and the seventh schedule to, the Public Health (London) Act 1936 (26 Geo. 5 & 1 Edw. 8. c. 50), which came into force on 1 October 1936.

== Bibliography ==
- Michael, William Henry. The Sanitary Acts: Comprising the Sewage Utilization Act, 1865, and the Sanitary Act, 1866, and various selections of other Acts incorporated therewith. H Sweet. Stevens and Sons. London. 1867. Google Books. Internet Archive.
- Austin, Robert Cecil. The Sanitary Act, 1866, with Notes, Statutes, &c. Nicholls Bros. Frederick Street, London. 1867. Internet Archive.
- Hutchins, James B. The Sanitary Act, 1866 (29 & 30 Vict., c. 90); and the Sewage Utilization Acts of 1865 and 1867 (28 & 29 Vict. c. 75, and 30 & 31 Vict. c. 113). Third Edition. Knight and Co. London. 1867.
- "The Sanitary Act, 1866". Halsbury's Statutes of England. (The Complete Statutes of England). First Edition. Butterworth & Co (Publishers) Limited. 1930. Volume 11. Pages 1005 to 1006.
- Paterson, William (ed). "Public Health Act". The Practical Statutes of the Session 1866. Horace Cox. Wellington Street, London. 1866. Pages 178 to 202.
