= Public Health (Ireland) Act 1878 =

Act of the Parliament of the United Kingdom

Public Health (Ireland) Act 1878 (Note: Section 1.)
- Act of Parliament
- Parliament of the United Kingdom
- Long title: An Act to consolidate and amend the Acts relating to Public Health in Ireland.
- Citation: 41 & 42 Vict. c. 52
- Territorial extent: United Kingdom

Dates
- Royal assent: 8 August 1878
- Commencement: 8 August 1878 (Note: The Acts of Parliament (Commencement) Act 1793.)
Other legislation
Amends	See § Repealed enactments
Repeals/revokes	See § Repealed enactments
Amended by	Statute Law Revision Act 1883; Public Authorities Protection Act 1893; Statute Law (Repeals) Act 1976
Relates to	Public Health Act 1875

Status: Partially repealed

Status
- Republic of Ireland: Partially repealed
- Northern Ireland: Partially repealed

Text of statute as originally enacted

The Public Health (Ireland) Act 1878 (41 & 42 Vict. c. 52) is an act of the Parliament of the United Kingdom which introduced a comprehensive code of sanitary law in Ireland.

== Provisions ==
=== Repealed enactments ===
Section 294 of the act repealed 20 enactments, listed in schedule A to the act.

Citation	Short title	Description	Extent of Repeal
14 & 15 Vict. c. 28	Common Lodging Houses Act 1851	The Common Lodging Houses Act, 1851	The whole act, so far as same relates to Ireland.
16 & 17 Vict. c. 41	Common Lodging Houses Act 1853	The Common Lodging Houses Act, 1853	The whole act, so far as same relates to Ireland.
23 & 24 Vict. c. 26	Common Lodging Houses Act, Ireland, 1860	The Common Lodging Houses Act (Ireland), 1860	The whole act.
17 & 18 Vict. c. 103	Towns Improvement (Ireland) Act 1854	The Towns Improvement (Ireland) Act, 1854	Sections 33, 34, 35, 42, 45, 46, 48, 49, 52, 53, 54.
18 & 19 Vict. c. 116	Diseases Prevention Act 1855	The Diseases Prevention Act, 1855	The whole act, so far as relates to Ireland.
18 & 19 Vict. c. 121	Nuisances Removal Act for England 1855	The Nuisances Removal Act for England, 1855	The whole act, so far as relates to Ireland.
23 & 24 Vict. c. 77	Nuisances Removal Act 1860	An Act to amend the Acts for the Removal of Nuisances and the Prevention of Diseases	The whole act, so far as relates to Ireland.
19 & 20 Vict. c. 98	Burial Grounds (Ireland) Act 1856	The Burial Grounds (Ireland) Act, 1856	The whole act.
23 & 24 Vict. c. 76	Burial Grounds (Ireland) Act 1860	An Act to amend the Burial Grounds (Ireland) Act, 1856	The whole act.
26 & 27 Vict. c. 117	Nuisances Removal Act for England (Amendment) Act 1863	The Nuisance Removal Act for England (Amendment) Act, 1863	The whole act, so far as relates to Ireland.
28 & 29 Vict. c. 75	Sewage Utilization Act 1865	The Sewage Utilization Act, 1865	The whole act, so far as relates to Ireland.
29 & 30 Vict. c. 41	Nuisances Removal Act (No. 1) 1866	The Nuisances Removal (No. 1) Act, 1866	The whole act, so far as relates to Ireland.
29 & 30 Vict. c. 90	Sanitary Act 1866	The Sanitary Act, 1866	The whole act, so far as relates to Ireland.
30 & 31 Vict. c. 113	Sewage Utilization Act 1867	The Sewage Utilization Act, 1867	The whole act, so far as relates to Ireland.
31 & 32 Vict. c. 115	Sanitary Act 1868	The Sanitary Act, 1868	The whole act, so far as relates to Ireland.
32 & 33 Vict. c. 100	Sanitary Loans Act 1869	The Sanitary Loans Act, 1869	The whole act, so far as relates to Ireland.
34 & 35 Vict. c. 109	Local Government (Ireland) Act 1871	The Local Government (Ireland) Act, 1871	The whole act, except sections 11 to 18, both inclusive, 20, 21, 24 to 27, both inclusive, 29 and 30, and the schedule.
35 & 36 Vict. c. 69	Local Government Board (Ireland) Act 1872	The Local Government Board (Ireland) Act, 1872	Sections 8 and 9.
36 & 37 Vict. c. 78	Sanitary Act 1866, Ireland, Amendment Act 1873	The Sanitary Act, 1866, (Ireland) Amendment Act, 1873	The whole act.
37 & 38 Vict. c. 93	Public Health (Ireland) Act 1874	The Public Health (Ireland) Act, 1874	The whole act.

== Subsequent developments ==
Section 263 of the act was repealed by section 2 of, and the schedule to, the Public Authorities Protection Act 1893 (56 & 57 Vict. c. 61), which came into force on 1 January 1894.

Section 261 of the act was repealed by section 1(1) of, and part XIX of schedule 1 to, the Statute Law (Repeals) Act 1976, which came into force on 27 May 1976.

== See also ==
- Public Health Act
- Irish poor laws

== Bibliography ==
- Galligan and McGrath. "Public Health (Ireland) Act 1878". Compulsory Purchase and Compensation in Ireland: Law and Practice. Second Edition. Bloomsbury Professional. 2013. Paragraphs 4.02 to 4.09 at pages 151 to 153.
- Vanston, George Thomas Barrett. The Law relating to Public Health in Ireland: being the Public Health (Ireland) Act, 1878, and amending Acts. With notes of all reported decisions, tables of cases and statutes, and an index. E Ponsonby. Dublin. 1892. Catalogue.
- William Dudley Wodsworth. The Public Health (Ireland) Act, 1878. Alexander Thom. Dublin. 1878. Catalogue. Reviewed at (1878) 2 The Medical Press and Circular 322 (16 October).
