= Public Health (Scotland) Act 1867 =

Act of the Parliament of the United Kingdom

Public Health (Scotland) Act 1867 (Note: Section 1.)
- Act of Parliament
- Parliament of the United Kingdom
- Long title: An Act to consolidate and amend the Law relating to the Public Health in Scotland.
- Citation: 30 & 31 Vict. c. 101
- Territorial extent: Scotland (Note: Preamble.)

Dates
- Royal assent: 10 August 1867
- Commencement: 1 November 1867 (Note: Section 2.)
- Repealed: 1 January 1898
Other legislation
Amends	See § Repealed enactments
Repeals/revokes	See § Repealed enactments
Amended by	Public Health (Scotland) Amendment Act 1871; Public Health (Scotland) Act 1867 Amendment Act 1875; Public Health (Scotland) Act 1867 Amendment Act 1882; Public Health Amendment (Scotland) Act 1890
Repealed by	Public Health (Scotland) Act 1897

Status: Repealed

Text of statute as originally enacted

The Public Health (Scotland) Act 1867 (30 & 31 Vict. c. 101) was an act of the Parliament of the United Kingdom that consolidated and amended enactments related to public health in Scotland.

== Provisions ==
=== Repealed enactments ===
Section 2 of the act repealed 4 enactments, listed in that section.

Citation	Short title	Extent of repeal
19 & 20 Vict. c. 103	Nuisances Removal (Scotland) Act 1856	The whole act, except Part V.
25 & 26 Vict. c. 101	General Police and Improvement (Scotland) Act 1862	Sections 441 to 447, both inclusive.
28 & 29 Vict. c. 75	Sewage Utilization Act 1865	So far as it applies to Scotland.
29 & 30 Vict. c. 90	Sanitary Act 1866	So far as it applies to Scotland.

== Subsequent developments ==
The whole act was repealed by section 196(1) of, and the first schedule to, the Public Health (Scotland) Act 1897 (60 & 61 Vict. c. 38), which came into operation on 1 January 1898.
