= Common Lodging Houses Act 1851 =

Act of the Parliament of the United Kingdom

Common Lodging Houses Act 1851 (Note: Section 1.)
- Act of Parliament
- Parliament of the United Kingdom
- Long title: An Act for the well-ordering of Common Lodging Houses.
- Citation: 14 & 15 Vict. c. 28
- Territorial extent: England and Wales; Ireland; (Note: Section 18.)

Dates
- Royal assent: 24 July 1851
- Commencement: 24 July 1851 (Note: The Acts of Parliament (Commencement) Act 1793.)
- Repealed: 1 October 1936
Other legislation
Amended by	Statute Law Revision Act 1875
Repealed by	Public Health Act 1875; Public Health (Ireland) Act 1878; Statute Law Revision Act 1892; Public Health (London) Act 1936

Status: Repealed

Text of statute as originally enacted

The Common Lodging Houses Act 1851 (14 & 15 Vict. c. 28), sometimes (like the Labouring Classes Lodging Houses Act 1851) known as the Shaftesbury Act, was an act of the Parliament of the United Kingdom. It is one of the principal British Housing Acts. It gave boroughs and vestries the power to supervise public health regarding 'common lodging houses' for the poor and migratory people. The act takes its name from Anthony Ashley-Cooper, 7th Earl of Shaftesbury.

== Subsequent developments ==
The whole act, except as related to the Metropolitan Police District, was repealed for England and Wales by section 343 of, and part I of schedule V to, the Public Health Act 1875 (38 & 39 Vict. c. 55), which came into force on 11 August 1875.

The whole act was repealed for Ireland by section 394 of, and schedule A to, the Public Health (Ireland) Act 1878 (41 & 42 Vict. c. 52), which came into force on 8 August 1878.

The whole act was repealed by section 308 of, and the seventh schedule to, the Public Health (London) Act 1936 (26 Geo. 5 & 1 Edw. 8. c. 50), which came into force on 1 October 1936.
