= Labouring Classes Lodging Houses Act 1851 =

Act of the Parliament of the United Kingdom

Labouring Classes Lodging Houses Act 1851 (Note: Section 1.)
- Act of Parliament
- Parliament of the United Kingdom
- Long title: An Act to encourage the Establishment of Lodging Houses for the Labouring Classes.
- Citation: 14 & 15 Vict. c. 34
- Territorial extent: England and Wales; Ireland; (Note: Section 53.)

Dates
- Royal assent: 24 July 1851
- Commencement: 24 July 1851 (Note: The Acts of Parliament (Commencement) Act 1793.)
- Repealed: 18 August 1890
Other legislation
Amended by	Statute Law Revision Act 1875
Repealed by	Housing of the Working Classes Act 1890

Status: Repealed

Text of statute as originally enacted

The Labouring Classes Lodging Houses Act 1851 (14 & 15 Vict. c. 34), sometimes (like the Common Lodging Houses Act 1851) known as the Shaftesbury Act, was an act of the Parliament of the United Kingdom. It is one of the principal British Housing Acts. It gave boroughs and vestries the power to raise funds via local rates or Public Works Loan Commissioners to build lodging houses for unmarried working (as opposed to unemployed) people. The act takes its name from Anthony Ashley-Cooper, 7th Earl of Shaftesbury.

== Subsequent developments ==
The whole act was repealed by section 102 of, and the seventh schedule to, the Housing of the Working Classes Act 1890 (53 & 54 Vict. c. 70), which came into force on 18 August 1890.
