= Gillingham Borough Council v Medway (Chatham) Dock Co. Ltd. =

English tort law case

Gillingham Borough Council v Medway (Chatham) Dock Co Ltd
- Court: High Court of Justice
- Full case name: Gillingham Borough Council v Medway (Chatham) Dock Co Ltd
- Decided: 1992
- Citation: [1992] 3 WLR 449, [1993] QB 343

Court membership
- Judge sitting: Buckley J

Gillingham Borough Council v Medway (Chatham) Dock Co Ltd [1993] QB 343 is a case in English tort law covering nuisance. The council granted planning permission to Medway (Chatham) Dock Co Ltd to redevelop the Chatham Dockyard as a commercial port, noting that this would have some impact on local residents but authorising it because the economic benefit would far outweigh any potential noise problems. The port's activity called for a large number of heavy duty vehicles moving around the clock, and by 1988 there were almost 750 lorries using the port per day. The Borough Council brought an action against the dock company in public nuisance on behalf of its residents, and the case was heard by Buckley J in the High Court of Justice. Buckley, while rejecting the dock company's arguments that only illegal acts could be public nuisances and that the granting of planning permission authorised the nuisance, held that the dock's activities were not a public nuisance. This was because the commercial dock had significantly changed the character of the area, changing the definition of what was and was not unreasonable behaviour.

== Facts ==
In 1982 the Chatham Dockyard began to close, threatening the economic stability of the Chatham area. In 1983 Gillingham Borough Council authorised the regeneration of the area as a commercial dock, granting planning permission and intending that it operate 24 hours a day. The fact that the 24-hour operating period would cause a disturbance in what was essentially a residential area was considered, but it was felt that the economic benefit the dock would produce outweighed this problem. The port went into full operation in 1984, and within 4 years almost 750 lorries were using the roads every day. In 1988, acting under Section 222(1) of the Local Government Act 1972, Gillingham Borough Council brought an action against the dock company on behalf of its residents, arguing that the company was creating a public nuisance against the residents of the area, thanks to the noise of heavy-duty vehicles going through the neighbourhood at night. The council sought an injunction limiting the hours in which vehicles could pass, saying it should only be permitted from 7:00am to 7:00pm.

== Judgment ==
The case came before Buckley J in the High Court, with the dock company arguing that only an illegal act could count as a public nuisance. Buckley rejected this argument, citing Lord Denning's judgment in Attorney-General v PYA Quarries Ltd, in which he defined a public nuisance as "a nuisance which is so widespread in its range and so indiscriminate in its effect that it would not be reasonable to expect one person to take proceedings on his own responsibility to put a stop to it, but that it should be taken on the responsibility of the community at large", not mentioning legality of the conduct in question. Buckley also cited a large number of cases where a public nuisance prosecution had succeeded despite the nuisance not being a crime at the time, such as R v Wheeler, R v Madden, and R v Holme.

Buckley decided both that planning permission did not create a licence to cause nuisance and that legal acts could count as a public nuisance. However, he came to the conclusion that no public nuisance had been created, saying that the change in the neighbourhood's character altered what was acceptable there: "where planning consent is given for a development or change of use, the question of nuisance will thereafter fall to be decided by reference to a neighbourhood with that development or use and not as it was previously". In this he drew on Thesiger LJ's judgment in Sturges v Bridgman; that what would be a nuisance in some areas is not so in others. His decision was further discussed in Wheeler v Saunders Ltd, where the Court of Appeal of England and Wales confirmed that the granting of planning permission would necessarily lead to significant changes to alter the character of an area.

== See also ==
- Nuisance in English law
- Wheeler v Saunders Ltd
- Gillingham Borough Council

== Bibliography ==
- Bermingham, Vera; Carol Brennan (2008). Tort Law. Oxford University Press. ISBN 978-0-19-922798-3.
- Ford, John D. (1993). "Planning a Nuisance". Cambridge Law Journal. 52 (1). Cambridge University Press: 15–17. doi:10.1017/S0008197300017116. ISSN 0008-1973. S2CID 143940536.
- Mullis, Alastair (1993). "The effective demise of public nuisance?". Conveyancer and Property Lawyer. 1993 (July/August). Sweet & Maxwell. ISSN 0010-8200.
- Steele, Jenny; Tim Jewell (1993). "Nuisance and Planning". Modern Law Review. 56 (4). Blackwell Publishing: 568–574. doi:10.1111/j.1468-2230.1993.tb01888.x. ISSN 0026-7961.
