= Public Health Act 1875 =

Act of the Parliament of the United Kingdom

Public Health Act 1875 (Note: Section 1.)
- Act of Parliament
- Parliament of the United Kingdom
- Long title: An Act for consolidating and amending the Acts relating to Public Health in England.
- Citation: 38 & 39 Vict. c. 55
- Territorial extent: England and Wales (Note: Section 2.)

Dates
- Royal assent: 11 August 1875
- Commencement: 11 August 1875 (Note: The Acts of Parliament (Commencement) Act 1793.)
Other legislation
Amends	See § Repealed enactments
Repeals/revokes	See § Repealed enactments
Amended by	Factory and Workshop Act 1878; Public Health (Fruit Pickers Lodgings) Act 1882; Statute Law Revision Act 1883; Epidemic and other Diseases Prevention Act 1883; Public Health (Confirmation of Byelaws) Act 1884; Summary Jurisdiction Act 1884; Public Health (Ships, &c.) Act 1885; Public Health (Members and Officers) Act 1885; Coroners Act 1887; Public Health Acts Amendment Act 1890; Public Health (London) Act 1891; Public Authorities Protection Act 1893; Local Government Act 1894; Public Health Acts Amendment Act 1907; Public Health Act 1908; Perjury Act 1911; Public Health Act 1925; Rating and Valuation Act 1925; Poor Law Act 1927; Local Government Act 1933; Public Health Act 1936; Public Health (London) Act 1936; Food and Drugs Act 1938; Gas Act 1948; Justices of the Peace Act 1949; Statute Law Revision Act 1950; Rivers (Prevention of Pollution) Act 1951; Highways Act 1959; London Government Act 1963; Local Government Act 1966; National Loans Act 1968; Courts Act 1971; Statute Law (Repeals) Act 1977; Statute Law (Repeals) Act 1978; Statute Law (Repeals) Act 1989; Statute Law (Repeals) Act 1993; Audit Commission Act 1998; Local Government Byelaws (Wales) Act 2012; Local Audit and Accountability Act 2014; Byelaws (Alternative Procedure) (England) Regulations 2016
Relates to	Public Health (Ireland) Act 1878; Factory and Workshop Act 1891

Status: Amended

Text of statute as originally enacted

Text of the Public Health Act 1875 as in force today (including any amendments) within the United Kingdom, from legislation.gov.uk.

Public Health Act 1875 (Support of Sewers) Amendment Act 1883 (Note: Section 1(1).)
- Act of Parliament
- Parliament of the United Kingdom
- Long title: An Act to amend the Public Health Act, 1875, and to make provision with respect to the support of public sewers and sewage works in mining districts.
- Citation: 46 & 47 Vict. c. 37
- Territorial extent: United Kingdom

Dates
- Royal assent: 25 August 1883
- Commencement: 25 August 1883 (Note: The Acts of Parliament (Commencement) Act 1793.)
- Repealed: 19 November 1998
Other legislation
Amends	See § Repealed enactments
Repeals/revokes	See § Repealed enactments
Repealed by	Statute Law (Repeals) Act 1998

Status: Repealed

Text of statute as originally enacted

Revised text of statute as amended

The Public Health Act 1875 (38 & 39 Vict. c. 55) is an act of the Parliament of the United Kingdom, one of the Public Health Acts, and a significant step in the advancement of public health in England.

As of 2026, the act remains in force in England and Wales.

Its purpose was to codify previous measures aimed at combating filthy urban living conditions, which caused various health threats, including the spread of many diseases such as cholera and typhus.

== Background ==
Reformers had from the 1830s wanted to resolve sanitary problems in urban areas, because sewage was flowing down the street daily, including the presence of sewage in living quarters. In 1848 their efforts led to the establishment of a three-man Board of Health – if one with very limited powers. Many factors delayed effective implementation of reform, however, such as the fact that to perform a clean-up would cost money, and neither government, factory owners, or local authorities were keen to pay. Gradually, however, reformers helped to counteract the laissez-faire attitude of the government and public. In 1871, the Board of Health was subsumed into the Local Government Board by the Liberal Party; and when the Conservatives came to power in 1874, they were committed by Disraeli to extending social reform. A Public Health Bill was introduced in 1875. Home Secretary Richard Cross was responsible for drafting the legislation, and received much good will from trades union groups in the consequent years for "humanising the toil of the working man". Disraeli ensured the passing of the 1875 act; and when mocked by his opponents for neglecting more important political reforms, retorted on them with the resounding phrase "sanitas sanitatum, omnia sanitas" (health above everything).

== Provisions ==
The act made it compulsory for local powers to:

1. purchase, repair or create sewers
2. control water-supplies
3. regulate cellars and lodging houses
4. establish by-laws for controlling new streets and buildings.

With the rapid urbanisation that accompanied the Industrial Revolution, huge swathes of terraced houses had been built to accommodate factory workers. The contrast between the housing stock built before the passage of the act and that built after it was stark.

The act required all new residential construction to include running water and an internal drainage system, and also led to the government prohibiting the construction of shoddy housing by building contractors.

The act also meant that every public health authority had to have a medical officer and a sanitary inspector, to ensure the laws on food, housing, water and hygiene were carried out; and that towns had to have pavements and street lighting.

It is, however, important to realise that the new powers provided were permissive, not compulsory: they provided a model of best practice for municipalities, but actual implementation remained for the most part up to the individual local authority.

Section 314 specifically empowered local authorities to make byelaws securing decent lodging and accommodation for hop-pickers. The Local Government Board subsequently circulated model byelaws based on recommendations drawn up in 1867 by the society of which the Rev. John Young Stratton was secretary. Stratton later told the Royal Commission on the Housing of the Working Classes that the provision had failed because adoption of the byelaws was permissive rather than compulsory.

Statutory trusts which are subject to section 164 of the act are required to dedicate their land to public recreation.

=== Repealed enactments ===
Section 343 of the act repealed 22 enactments, listed in parts I and II of schedule V to the act.

Repeals by part I
Citation	Short title	Description	Extent of repeal
11 & 12 Vict. c. 63	Public Health Act 1848	The Public Health Act, 1848	The whole act. (Note: Section 83 of the act was re-enacted in part III of schedule V to the act.)
14 & 15 Vict. c. 28	Common Lodging Houses Act 1851	The Common Lodging Houses Act, 1851.	The whole act, except so far as relates to the Metropolitan Police District.
16 & 17 Vict. c. 41	Common Lodging Houses Act 1853	The Common Lodging Houses Act, 1853.	The whole act, except so far as relates to the Metropolitan Police District.
18 & 19 Vict. c. 116	Diseases Prevention Act 1855	The Diseases Prevention Act, 1855.	The whole act, except so far as relates to the Metropolis.
18 & 19 Vict. c. 121	Nuisances Removal Act for England 1855	The Nuisances Removal Act for England, 1855.	The whole act, except so far as relates to the Metropolis.
21 & 22 Vict. c. 98	Local Government Act 1858	The Local Government Act, 1858.	The whole act.
23 & 24 Vict. c. 77	Nuisances Removal Act 1860	An Act to amend the Acts for the Removal of Nuisances and the Prevention of Diseases.	The whole act, except so far as relates to the Metropolis.
24 & 25 Vict. c. 61	Local Government Act (1858) Amendment Act 1861	The Local Government Act (1858) Amendment Act, 1861.	The whole act. (Note: Section 21 of the act was re-enacted in part III of schedule V to the act.)
26 & 27 Vict. c. 17	Local Government Act Amendment Act 1863	The Local Government Act Amendment Act, 1863.	The whole act.
26 & 27 Vict. c. 117	Nuisances Removal Act for England (Amendment) Act 1863	The Nuisances Removal Act for England (Amendment) Act, 1863.	The whole act, except so far as relates to the Metropolis.
28 & 29 Vict. c. 75	Sewage Utilization Act 1865	The Sewage Utilization Act, 1865.	The whole act, except so far as relates to Scotland and Ireland.
29 & 30 Vict. c. 41	Nuisances Removal Act (No. 1) 1866	The Nuisances Removal (No.1) Act, 1866.	The whole act, except so far as relates to the Metropolis.
29 & 30 Vict. c. 90	Sanitary Act 1866	The Sanitary Act, 1866	Parts I, II, and III, except so far as relates to the Metropolis or to Scotland or Ireland.
30 & 31 Vict. c. 113	Sewage Utilization Act 1867	The Sewage Utilization Act, 1867.	The whole act, except so far as relates to Scotland or Ireland.
31 & 32 Vict. c. 115	Sanitary Act 1868	The Sanitary Act, 1868	The whole act, except so far as relates to the Metropolis.
32 & 33 Vict. c. 100	Sanitary Loans Act 1869	The Sanitary Loans Act, 1869	The whole act, except so far as relates to the Metropolis.
33 & 34 Vict. c. 53	Sanitary Act 1870	The Sanitary Act, 1870	The whole act, except so far as relates to the Metropolis.
35 & 36 Vict. c. 79	Public Health Act 1872	The Public Health Act, 1872	The whole act, except so far as relates to the Metropolis.
37 & 38 Vict. c. 89	Sanitary Law Amendment Act 1874	The Sanitary Law Amendment Act, 1874.	The whole act, except so far as relates to the Metropolis or the Metropolitan Police District.

Repealed by part II
Citation	Short title	Description	Extent of repeal
12 & 13 Vict. c. 94	Public Health Supplemental Act 1849	The Public Health Supplemental Act, 1849.	The whole act, except—: Section 1 (Confirmation of certain provisional orders of the General Board of Health), and section 12 (short title of Act), and the schedule.
13 & 14 Vict. c. 90	Public Health Supplemental (No. 2) Act 1850	The Public Health Supplemental Act, 1850 (No. 2.)	The whole act, except—: Section 1 (certain provisional orders of General Board of Health confirmed), and section 7 (short title of Act), and the schedule.
15 & 16 Vict. c. 42	First Public Health Supplemental Act 1852	The first Public Health Supplemental Act, 1852.	Sections 6 to 12, both inclusive (first election or first selection and election of certain local boards), and section 13 (11 & 12 Vict. c. 63. ss. 68, 69, as to repair of highways), and section 14 (interpretation of year), and section 15 (Act incorporated with Public Health Act).

== Subsequent developments ==
Section 264 of the act was repealed by section 2 of, and the schedule to, the Public Authorities Protection Act 1893 (56 & 57 Vict. c. 61), which came into force on 1 January 1894.

So much of part III of the fifth schedule as re-enacts section 43 of the Public Health Act 1872 (35 & 36 Vict. c. 79.) was repealed by section 245(1) of, and the eleventh schedule to, Poor Law Act 1927 (17 & 18 Geo. 5. c. 14), which came into force on 1 October 1927.

Section 145 of the act was repealed by section 1(1) of, and the first schedule to, the Statute Law Revision Act 1950 (14 Geo. 6. c. 6), which came into force on 23 May 1950.

== See also ==
- History of public health in the United Kingdom
- Health of Towns Association
- Municipal socialism
- Sanitary district

== Bibliography ==
- Halsbury's Statutes. Third Edition. Volume 26. Page 38.
- Thomas Whiteside Hime. Public Health: The Practical Guide to the Public Health Act, 1875, and Correlated Acts, for the Use of Medical Officers of Health and Inspectors of Nuisances. Bailliere, Tindall and Cox. 1884. Internet Archive.
- William Cunningham Glen and Alexander Glen. The Public Health Act, 1875, and the Law relating to Public Health, Local Government, and Urban and Rural Sanitary Authorities. Eighth Edition. Butterworths. Knight & Co. London. 1876. Internet Archive.
- James C Stevens. The Public Health Act 1875: Arranged in a Dictionary Index Form. Shaw and Sons. London. 1876. Internet Archive.
- Robert Rawlinson. The Public Health Act 1875: Suggestions as to the Preparation of District Maps, and of Plans for the Main Sewerage, Drainage, and Water Supply (Revised to 1878). HMSO. London. 1878. Internet Archive (the description of this book, on that webpage, as another work by William Glen is erroneous).
- World History 4th Edition by William J. Duiker and Jackson J. Spielvogel
