= Nuisance in English law =

Area of tort law in England

Nuisance in English law is an area of tort law broadly divided into two torts; private nuisance, where the actions of the defendant are "causing a substantial and unreasonable interference with a [claimant]'s land or his/her use or enjoyment of that land", and public nuisance, where the defendant's actions "materially affects the reasonable comfort and convenience of life of a class of His Majesty's subjects"; public nuisance is also a crime. Both torts have been present from the time of Henry III, being affected by a variety of philosophical shifts through the years which saw them become first looser and then far more stringent and less protecting of an individual's rights. Each tort requires the claimant to prove that the defendant's actions caused interference, which was unreasonable, and in some situations the intention of the defendant may also be taken into account. A significant difference is that private nuisance does not allow a claimant to claim for any personal injury suffered, while public nuisance does.

Private nuisance has received a range of criticism, with academics arguing that its concepts are poorly defined and open to judicial manipulation. Conor Gearty has written that "Private nuisance has, if anything, become even more confused and confusing. Its chapter lies neglected in the standard works, little changed over the years, its modest message overwhelmed by the excitements to be found elsewhere in tort. Any sense of direction which may have existed in the old days is long gone". In addition, it has been claimed that the tort of private nuisance has "lost its separate identity as a strict liability tort and been assimilated in all but name into the fault-based tort of negligence", and that private and public nuisance "have little in common except the accident of sharing the same name".

== History ==
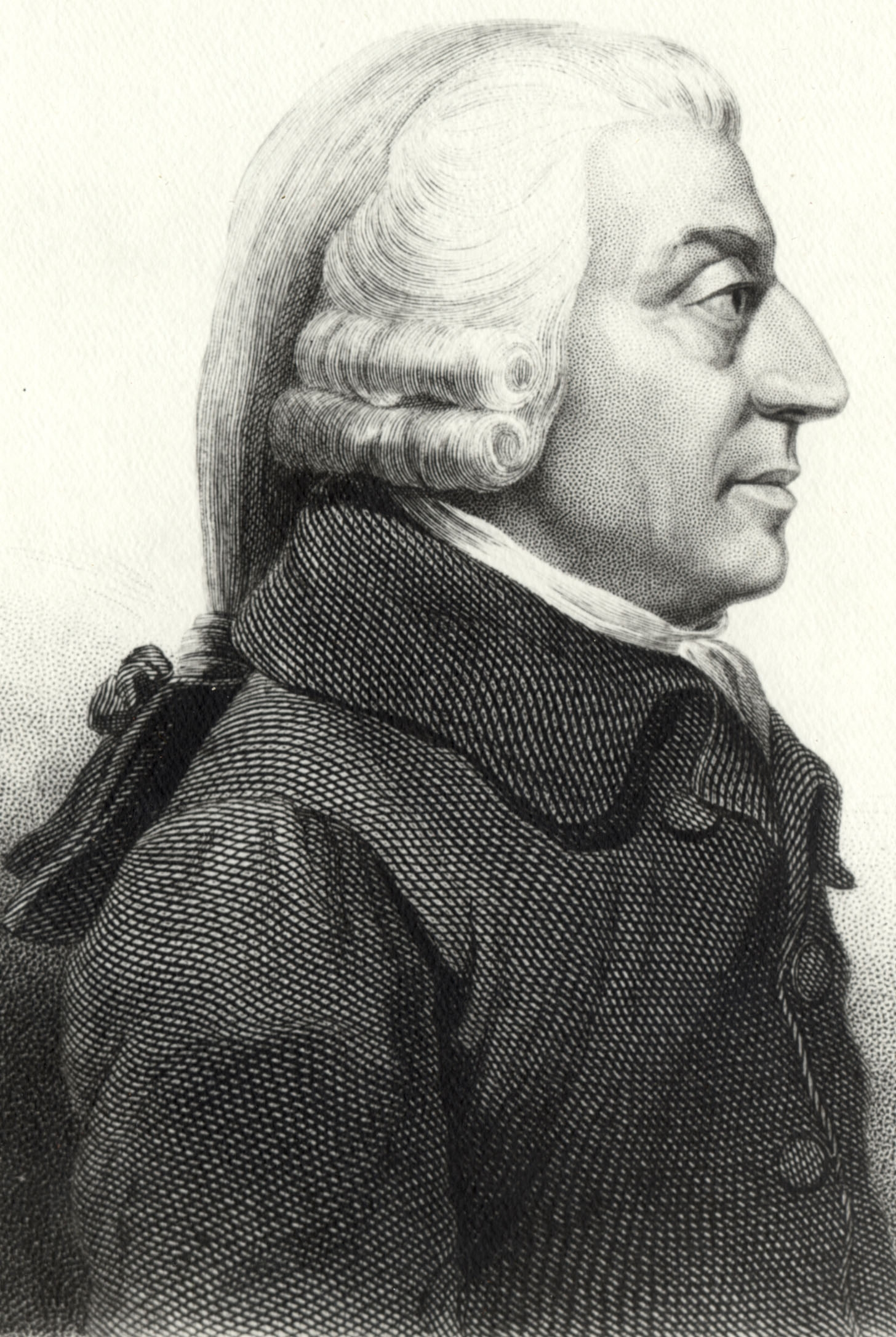
Adam Smith; A. V. Dicey argued that his work led to a laissez faire attitude to industrial pollution and damages during the 19th century.

The tort of nuisance has existed since the reign of Henry III, with few changes, and most of them merely technical. It originally came from the Latin nocumentum, and then the French nuisance, with Henry de Bracton initially defining the tort of nuisance as an infringement of easements. The tort was in line with the economic status quo of the time, protecting claimants against their neighbours' rights to develop land, and thus has been described as "rural, agricultural, and conservative". There were initially four remedies for nuisance; the assize of nuisance, similar to the assize of novel disseisin, which was limited to situations where the defendant's actions interfered with the claimant's seisin; the action guod permittat prosternere, where the land in question was alienated; the writ of trespass; and the "action upon the case for nuisance", which became the main remedy. This was because it was far faster than the other writs and actions, and unlike them did not require that both parties be freeholders. It was, however, limited to damages, and unlike the other remedies did not allow for abatement.

By the 17th century the judicial philosophy had changed to allow the protection of a claimant's enjoyment of their land, with the duty being on the party that caused the nuisance to prevent it: "as every man is bound to look to his cattle, as to keep them out of his neighbour's ground; so he must keep in the filth of his house of office, that it may not flow in upon and damnify his neighbour". During the 19th century and the Industrial Revolution, the law of nuisance significantly changed; rather than the previous tests a standard of care was instead expected, with different standards applying to individuals and companies. In reaching these decisions the courts "effectively emasculated the Law of Nuisance as a useful curb on industrial pollution". In St Helen's Smelting Co v Tipping, for example, several judges "were explicit in suggesting that they were affected by the adverse effect of a more draconian view on the economic welfare of the country's industrial cities". This contrasted with the previous view, which was that when liability was established for a case where the defendant's actions had interfered with the enjoyment of land, the defendant would be liable however trivial the interference.

The decisions reached during this period vary, however, mostly due to the differing judicial philosophies of the time. While A. V. Dicey maintained that the prevalent philosophy was one of laissez faire thanks to the influence of philosophers and economists such as Adam Smith, Michael W. Flinn asserted that:

Another common error... has been the assumption that the classical economists were the only effective influence on social and economic policy in the early and mid-nineteenth century. This is a curiously perverse view, since it ignores powerful voices like those of Bentham, Chadwick, the social novelists, many by no means inarticulate members of the medical profession, the humanitarians, the Christian Socialists and most sections of the many working class movements. There was in short, nothing approaching a consensus of opinion concerning laissez-faire and state intervention, even in the very narrow social sector represented by governments, Parliament, and the press. In practice the ears of ministers were assaulted by a confused babble of voices rather than bewitched by the soft whisper of a single plea for inaction.

Nuisances Removal Act 1860
- Act of Parliament
- Parliament of the United Kingdom
- Long title: An Act to amend the Acts for the Removal of Nuisances and the Prevention of Diseases.
- Citation: 23 & 24 Vict. c. 77
- Territorial extent: United Kingdom

Dates
- Royal assent: 6 August 1860
- Commencement: 6 August 1860 (Note: The Acts of Parliament (Commencement) Act 1793.)
- Repealed: 1 January 1892
Other legislation
Amends	Diseases Prevention Act 1855; Nuisances Removal Act for England 1855
Amended by	Public Health Act 1875; Public Health (Ireland) Act 1878
Repealed by	Public Health (London) Act 1891
Relates to	Nuisances Removal Act for England (Amendment) Act 1863; Nuisances Removal (No. 1) Act 1866

Status: Repealed

Text of statute as originally enacted

Nuisances Removal Act for England (Amendment) Act 1863 (Note: Section 5.)
- Act of Parliament
- Parliament of the United Kingdom
- Long title: An Act to amend the Nuisances Removal Act for England, 1855, with respect to the Seizure of diseased and unwholesome Meat.
- Citation: 26 & 27 Vict. c. 117
- Territorial extent: United Kingdom

Dates
- Royal assent: 28 July 1863
- Commencement: 28 July 1863 (Note: Section 1.)
- Repealed: 1 January 1892
Other legislation
Amends	Nuisances Removal Act for England 1855
Amended by	Statute Law Revision Act 1875; Public Health Act 1875
Repealed by	Public Health (London) Act 1891
Relates to	Nuisances Removal Act 1860; Nuisances Removal (No. 1) Act 1866

Status: Repealed

Text of statute as originally enacted

Smoke Nuisance (Scotland) Act 1857 (Note: The citation of this act by this short title was authorised by section 1 of, and the first schedule to, the Short Titles Act 1896. Due to the repeal of those provisions it is now authorised by section 19(2) of the Interpretation Act 1978.)
- Act of Parliament
- Parliament of the United Kingdom
- Long title: An Act for the Abatement of the Nuisance arising from the Smoke of Furnaces in Scotland.
- Citation: 20 & 21 Vict. c. 73
- Territorial extent: Scotland (Note: Preamble.)

Dates
- Royal assent: 5 July 1865
- Commencement: 1 August 1858
- Repealed: 31 December 1956
Other legislation
Amended by	Local Government (Scotland) Act 1947
Repealed by	Clean Air Act 1956

Status: Repealed

Text of statute as originally enacted

Smoke Nuisance (Scotland) Act 1865
- Act of Parliament
- Parliament of the United Kingdom
- Long title: An Act to amend an Act of the Twentieth and Twenty-first Years of Her Majesty, for the Abatement of the Nuisance arising from the Smoke of Furnaces in Scotland, and an Act of the Twenty-fourth Year of Her Majesty to amend the said Act.
- Citation: 28 & 29 Vict. c. 102
- Territorial extent: Scotland

Dates
- Royal assent: 5 July 1865
- Commencement: 5 July 1865
- Repealed: 31 December 1956
Other legislation
Amends	Smoke Nuisance (Scotland) Act 1857; Smoke of Furnaces (Scotland) Act 1861
Repealed by	Clean Air Act 1956

Status: Repealed

Text of statute as originally enacted

Nuisances Removal (No. 1) Act 1866 (Note: Section 3.)
- Act of Parliament
- Parliament of the United Kingdom
- Long title: An Act to amend the Nuisances Removal and Diseases Prevention Act, 1860.
- Citation: 29 & 30 Vict. c. 41
- Territorial extent: United Kingdom

Dates
- Royal assent: 28 June 1866
- Commencement: 28 June 1866
- Repealed: 1 January 1892
Other legislation
Amends	Nuisances Removal and Diseases Prevention Act 1860
Amended by	Statute Law Revision Act 1875
Repealed by	Public Health (London) Act 1891
Relates to	Nuisances Removal Act for England 1855; Nuisances Removal Act for England (Amendment) Act 1863

Status: Repealed

Text of statute as originally enacted

19th-century legislation included:

- Nuisances Removal Act for England 1855 (19 & 20 Vict. c. 121)
- Smoke Nuisance (Scotland) Act 1857 (20 & 21 Vict. c. 73)
- Nuisances Removal Act 1860 (23 & 24 Vict. c. 77)
- Nuisances Removal Act for England (Amendment) Act 1863 (26 & 27 Vict. c. 117)
- Smoke Nuisance (Scotland) Act 1865 (28 & 29 Vict. c. 102)
- Nuisances Removal (No. 1) Act 1866 (29 & 30 Vict. c. 41)

The legislation recognised that diseased meat could cause sickness and needed to be removed from sale. In 1864 William Johnstone, a "wholesale pork pie manufacturer and sausage roll maker", was fined £15 (2025: £1,600), under the 1863 Act, for having on his premises a large quantity of meat unsound, unwholesome and unfit for food.

== Private nuisance ==
Private nuisance was defined in Bamford v Turnley, where George Wilshere, 1st Baron Bramwell defined it as "any continuous activity or state of affairs causing a substantial and unreasonable interference with a [claimant's] land or his use or enjoyment of that land". Private nuisance, unlike public nuisance, is only a tort, and damages for personal injuries are not recoverable. Only those who have a legal interest in the affected land can sue; an exception was made in Khorasandjian v Bush, where the Court of Appeal held that a woman living in her mother's house was entitled to an injunction to prevent telephone harassment despite having no legal interest in the property. In Hunter v Canary Wharf Ltd, however, the House of Lords rejected this development, arguing that to remove the need for an interest in the affected property would transform the tort of nuisance from a tort to land into a tort to the person. The liable party under private nuisance is the creator, even if he is no longer in occupation of the land or created a nuisance on somebody else's land. In Sedleigh-Denfield v O'Callaghan, it was held that the defendant was liable for a nuisance (a set of water pipes) even though he had not created it, because he had used the pipes and thereby "adopted" the nuisance.

There is a general rule that a landlord who leases a property is not liable for nuisances created after the occupier takes control of the land. There is an exception where the lease is granted for a purpose which constitutes a nuisance, as in Tetley v Chitty, or where the nuisance is caused by their failure to repair the premises, as in Wringe v Cohen. The landlord is also liable were the nuisance existed before the land was let, and he knew or ought to have known about it. Under the principle of vicarious liability, an occupier of land can also be liable for the actions of their employees; in Matania v National Provincial Bank, it was also established that they could be liable for the activities of independent contractors under certain circumstances.

For there to be a claim in private nuisance, the claimant must show that the defendant's actions caused damage. This can be physical damage, as in St Helen's Smelting Co v Tipping, or discomfort and inconvenience. The test for remoteness of damage in nuisance is reasonable foreseeability, as established in Cambridge Water Co Ltd v Eastern Counties Leather plc; if the defendant was using their land unreasonably and causing a nuisance, the defendant is liable even if they used reasonable care to avoid creating a nuisance. The test is whether or not the nuisance was reasonably foreseeable; if it was, the defendant is expected to avoid it.

=== Interference ===
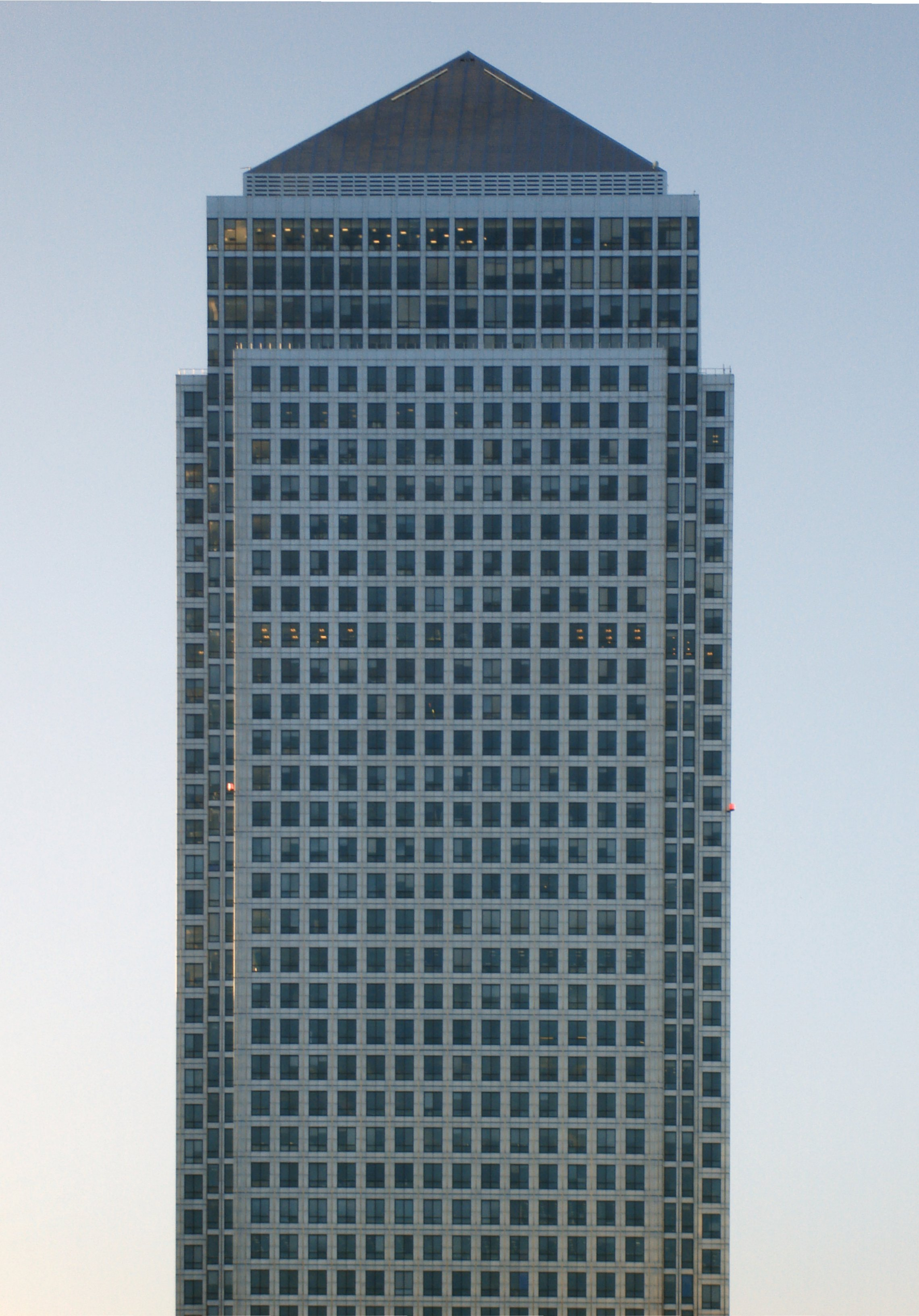
One Canada Square, the subject of Hunter v Canary Wharf Ltd.

The claimant must first show that the defendant's actions have caused an interference with their use or enjoyment of the land. These interferences are indirect, and almost always the result of continuing events rather than a one-off incident. This interference may be a physical invasion of the land, such as in Davey v Harrow Corporation, noise, as in Christie v Davey, or smells, such as in Wheeler v J J Saunders. The courts have allowed cases where the interference causes emotional distress, as in Thompson-Schwab v Costaki, but have been loath to protect recreational facilities or "things of delight"; things such as the blocking of a pleasant view or a television signal are not considered a nuisance. The latter was discussed in Hunter v Canary Wharf Ltd, where the claimants argued that the blocking of their television signal by the construction of the skyscraper at One Canada Square was a nuisance. The House of Lords rejected this argument. There are rights to land known as servitudes, such as the right to light through windows or the right of support. An occupier can also be liable for an interference that is naturally arising, assuming they are aware of the interference's existence and fail to take reasonable precautions, as in Leakey v National Trust, which established that in such situations "the standard ought to be to require of the occupier what is reasonable to expect of him in his individual circumstances". This principle was extended in Holbeck Hall Hotel v Scarborough Borough Council, where the Court of Appeal said that if a landowner knows or ought to know that their property may cease to support another's, they are required to take reasonable precautions or they will be liable.

=== Unreasonableness ===
While there is no set definition of what is or is not unreasonable, factors that are taken into account include any "abnormal sensitivity" of the claimant, the nature of the locality where the nuisance took place, the time and duration of the interference and the conduct of the defendant. "Abnormal sensitivity" is where the claimant's damaged property is particularly sensitive to damage by the defendant's actions. In Robinson v Kilvert, it was established that if the action of the defendant would not have caused damage were it not for this abnormal sensitivity, the defendant is not liable. However, if the damage was caused to abnormally sensitive property but would also have damaged non-sensitive property, the defendant is liable, as in McKinnon Industries v Walker. This was because it infringed on the "right to ordinary enjoyment"; as a result, the claimant could claim for his more sensitive activities as well.

The locality where the interference occurred also influences whether or not it was unreasonable; in Sturges v Bridgman in 1879, Thesiger LJ wrote that "what would be a nuisance in Belgrave Square [a leafy residential area] would not necessarily be so in Bermondsey [then a smelly industrial area]". If an activity is out of place with the locality, it is likely to be held as unreasonable. However, the nature of areas can change over time; in Gillingham Borough Council v Medway (Chatham) Dock Co Ltd, it was held that the granting of planning permission to develop a commercial dock in an area changed that area's character, preventing the local residence from claiming in private nuisance for the disturbance the dock created. The granting of planning permission does not constitute immunity from a claim in nuisance, however; in Wheeler v Saunders Ltd. the Court of Appeal said that it would be "a misuse of language to describe what has happened in the present case as a change in the character of the neighbourhood. It is a change of use of a very small piece of land... it is not a strategic planning decision affected by considerations of public interest. Unless one is prepared to accept that any planning decision authorises any nuisance which must inevitably come from it, the argument that the nuisance was authorised by planning permission in this case must fail". In situations where the defendant's activities cause physical damage, as in St Helen's Smelting Co v Tipping, the locality of the activities is not a factor in deciding their unreasonableness.

The time and duration of the activity is also taken into account when determining unreasonableness. Activities may be reasonable at one time but not at another; in Halsey v Esso Petroleum, filling oil tankers at 10am was held to be reasonable, but the same activity undertaken at 10pm was unreasonable. A private nuisance is normally a "continuing state of affairs", not a one-off situation; there are exceptions, such as in De Keyser's Royal Hotel v Spicer, where piledriving at night was considered a nuisance. In such situations, the normal remedy is to grant an injunction limiting the time of the activity. Another exception was found in British Celanese v AH Hunt Ltd, where an electronics company stored foil strips on their property which blew onto adjoining land, causing the power supply to a nearby yarn manufacturers to be cut off. A similar incident had occurred 3 years earlier and the defendants had been warned to store their strips properly; it was held that even though the power cut was a one-off event, the method of storing the foil strips constituted a continuing state of affairs, and the defendants were liable.

=== Conduct of the defendant ===
In some circumstances, the conduct of the defendant can be a factor in determining the unreasonableness of their interference. In this situation the motives of the defendant and the reasonableness of their conduct are the factors used to determine the unreasonableness of their actions. This is one of the few exceptions to the rule that malice is not relevant in tort law. In Christie v Davey, the defendant was deliberately creating a noise to frustrate the claimants; based on this, it was held that their actions were malicious, unreasonable, and amounted to a nuisance.

=== Issues with private nuisance ===
The idea of private nuisance has been criticised by academics for at least 50 years. Criticism centres on the free rein given to the judiciary and the lack of concrete definitions for legal principles; the idea of "reasonableness", for examples, is frequently bandied about, but "rarely examined in detail, and it would be a brave person who would attempt to draw out a definition". While a definition for private nuisance is easy to find, the regularly accepted one does not consider that most private nuisance cases involve two occupiers of land; the "nuisance" has moved from the defendant's land to the claimant's land. Some judicial rationes decidendi, such as that of Lord Wright in Sedleigh-Denfield v O'Callaghan, seem to indicate that private nuisance is only valid in situations where there are two occupiers of land. Despite this, definitions of private nuisance fail to include any reference. Academics also assert that the tort of private nuisance has "lost its separate identity as a strict liability tort and been assimilated in all but name into the fault-based tort of negligence". Conor Gearty supports the assertion that private nuisance is confused, and also claims that private nuisance is significantly different from public nuisance; "they have little in common except the accident of sharing the same name... Private nuisance has, if anything, become even more confused and confusing. Its chapter lies neglected in the standard works, little changed over the years, its modest message overwhelmed by the excitements to be found elsewhere in tort. Any sense of direction which may have existed in the old days is long gone".

== Public nuisance ==
Public nuisance concerns protecting the public, unlike private nuisance, which protects an individual. As such it is not only a tort but also a crime. In Attorney-General v PYA Quarries Ltd, it was defined by Romer LJ as any act or omission "which materially affects the reasonable comfort and convenience of life of a class of Her Majesty's subjects". Because of the wide definition given, there are a large range of issues which can be dealt with through public nuisance, including picketing on a road, as in Thomas v NUM, blocking a canal, as in Rose v Miles, or disrupting traffic by queuing in a road, as in Lyons v Gulliver. A significant difference between private and public nuisance is that under public, one can claim for personal injuries as well as damage to property. Another difference is that public nuisance is primarily a crime; it only becomes a tort if the claimant can prove that they suffered "special damage" over and above the effects on the other affected people in the "class". The test for the required size of a "class" was also discussed in the Attorney-General v PYA Quarries Ltd, with the court concluding that the test was whether the nuisance was "so widespread in its range or so indiscriminate in its effect that it would not be reasonable to expect one person to take proceedings on his own responsibility to put a stop to it, but that it should be taken on the responsibility of the community at large".

Because public nuisance is primarily a criminal matter, and affects a "class" of people rather than an individual, claims are normally brought by the Attorney General for England and Wales as a "relator", representing the affected people. Other members of the affected class are allowed to sue individually, but only if they have suffered "special damage". The potential defendants in public nuisance claims are the same as those in private nuisance, with their liability dependent on a test of reasonableness; in public nuisance, however, this is determined by looking solely at the interference, not the defendant's actions.

In June 2015, the Law Commission issued a report recommending the common law offence of public nuisance be abolished, and replaced with a statutory offence of 'intentionally or recklessly causing public nuisance'. This recommendation was eventually enacted as section 78 of the Police, Crime, Sentencing and Courts Act 2022.

== Defences ==
There are several defences to nuisance claims; in Nichols v Marsland, for example, "Act of God" was accepted as a defence. One defence is that of "20 years prescription", which is valid for private nuisance but not public. If a private nuisance continues for 20 years, it becomes legal by prescription, assuming the defendant can show that it has been continuous and the claimant has been aware of it. A limitation is that the 20 years is from when the activity became a nuisance, not from when the activity started. In Sturges v Bridgman, the claimant, a doctor, lived next to a "confectionery business". Vibrations and noises coming from this business continued for over 20 years without causing the doctor nuisance, and the doctor only complained after building a consulting room in his garden. It was held that the actual nuisance only started when the consulting room was built and the activity began to affect the doctor, not when the activity started. A second defence is statutory authority, when an activity is authorised by a piece of legislation; this applies to both public and private nuisance. This applies even when the activity is carried out not directly in line with the statute, but intra vires. In Allen v Gulf Oil Refining Ltd, the defendant was authorised to build an oil refinery in Milford Haven by an act of Parliament, the Gulf Oil Refining Act 1965 (c. xxiv). The act gave no express authority to operate it, and after it came into operation the claimant argued that it caused a nuisance through the smell and noise. The House of Lords held that it had statutory authority to operate the refinery, saying "Parliament can hardly be supposed to have intended the refinery to be nothing more than a visual adornment to the landscape in an area of natural beauty". The statutory authority defence has been subject to legislative consideration in the Planning Act 2008, which expands the defence to over 14 types of infrastructure development.

== Remedies ==
There are three possible remedies where a defendant is found to have committed a nuisance; injunctions, damages and abatement.

Injunctions are the main remedy, and consist of an order to stop the activity causing the nuisance (Mandatory or prohibitory) They may be "perpetual", completely forbidding the activity, or "partial", for example limiting when the activity can take place.

Damages are a monetary sum paid by the defendant for the claimant's loss of enjoyment or any physical damage suffered; they may be paid for things as varied as loss of sleep or any loss of comfort caused by noise or smells.

Abatement is a remedy that allows the claimant to directly end the nuisance, such as trimming back a protruding hedge. If the abatement requires the claimant stepping onto the defendant's land, he must give notice or risk becoming a trespasser.

== Bibliography ==
- Bermingham, Vera; Carol Brennan (2008). Tort Law. Oxford University Press. ISBN 978-0-19-922798-3.
- Brenner, Joel Franklin (1974). "Nuisance Law and the Industrial Revolution". Journal of Legal Studies. 3 (2): 403–433. doi:10.1086/467519. ISSN 0047-2530. S2CID 153577677.
- Cross, Gerry (1995). "Does only the careless polluter pay? A fresh examination of the nature of private nuisance". Law Quarterly Review. 111 (3). ISSN 0023-933X.
- Elliott, Catherine; Francis Quinn (2007). Tort Law (6th ed.). Pearson Longman. ISBN 978-1-4058-4672-1.
- Gearty, Conor (1989). "The Place of Private Nuisance in a Modern Law of Torts". Cambridge Law Journal. 48 (2): 214–242. doi:10.1017/S000819730010529X. ISSN 0008-1973. S2CID 145422561.
- Lee, Maria (2003). "Law Quarterly Review". Law Quarterly Review. 119 (2). ISSN 0023-933X.
- Moor, Francis (2011). "Planning for nuisance?: A review of the effects of the Planning Act 2008 on the statutory authority defence in the UK". International Journal of Law in the Built Environment. 3 (1). doi:10.1108/17561451111122615.
- McLaren, John P.S. (1983). "Nuisance Law and the Industrial Revolution – Some Lessons from Social History". Oxford Journal of Legal Studies. 3 (2): 155–221. doi:10.1093/ojls/3.2.155. ISSN 0143-6503.
- Winfield, P.H. (1931). "Nuisance as a Tort". Cambridge Law Journal. 4 (2): 189–206. doi:10.1017/S0008197300132933. ISSN 0008-1973. S2CID 144619674.
