= Public Health Act =

Stock short title used for UK legislation

Public Health Act is a stock short title used in the United Kingdom for legislation relating to public health.

== List ==
- The Public Health Act 1848 (11 & 12 Vict. c. 63)
- The Sanitary Act 1866 (29 & 30 Vict. c. 90) is sometimes called the Public Health Act 1866
- The Public Health Act 1872 (35 & 36 Vict. c. 79)
- The Public Health Act 1896 (59 & 60 Vict. c. 19)
- The Public Health (Ports) Act 1896 (59 & 60 Vict. c. 20)
- The Public Health Act 1904 (4 Edw. 7. c. 16)
- The Public Health (Regulations as to Food) Act 1907 (7 Edw. 7. c. 32)
- The Public Health Acts Amendment Act 1907 (7 Edw. 7. c. 53)
- The Public Health Act 1908 (8 Edw. 7. c. 6)
- The Public Health (Prevention and Treatment of Disease) Act 1913 (3 & 4 Geo. 5. c 23)
- The Public Health (Tuberculosis) Act 1921 (11 & 12 Geo. 5. c. 12)
- The Public Health (Officers) Act 1921 (11 & 12 Geo. 5. c. 23)
- The Public Health Act 1925 (15 & 16 Geo. 5. c. 71)
- The Public Health (Smoke Abatement) Act 1926 (16 & 17 Geo. 5. c. 43)
- The Public Health (Cleansing of Shell-fish) Act 1932 (22 & 23 Geo. 5. c. 28)
- The Public Health (Water and Sewerage) (Scotland) Act 1935 (25 & 26 Geo. 5. c. 36)
- The Public Health (Coal Mine Refuse) Act 1939 (2 & 3 Geo. 6. c. 58)
- The Public Health Act 1961 (9 & 10 Eliz. 2. c. 64)
- The Public Health (Notification of Births) Act 1965
- The Health Services and Public Health Act 1968
- The Public Health (Recurring Nuisances) Act 1969 (c. 25)
- The Public Health Laboratory Service Act 1979
- The Public Health (Control of Disease) Act 1984
- The Public Health (London) Act 1891 (54 & 55 Vict. c. 76)
- The Public Health (London) Act 1891 Amendment Act 1893 (56 & 57 Vict. c. 47)
- The Public Health (London) Act 1936 (26 Geo. 5 & 1 Edw. 8. c. 50)
- The Public Health (Scotland) Act 1867 (30 & 31 Vict. c. 101)
- The Public Health (Scotland) Amendment Act 1871 (34 & 35 Vict. c. 38)
- The Public Health (Scotland) Act 1867 Amendment Act 1875 (37 & 38 Vict. c. 74)
- The Public Health (Scotland) Act 1867 Amendment Act 1879 (42 & 43 Vict. c. 15)
- The Public Health (Scotland) Act 1867 Amendment Act 1882 (45 & 46 Vict. c. 11)
- The Public Health Amendment (Scotland) Act 1890 (53 & 54 Vict. c. 20)
- The Public Health (Scotland) Amendment Act 1891 (54 & 55 Vict. c. 52)
- The Public Health (Scotland) Act (1897) Amendment Act 1911 (1 & 2 Geo. 5. c. 30)
- The Public Health (Scotland) Amendment Act 1925 (15 & 16 Geo. 5. c. 75)
- The Public Health (Scotland) Act 1945 (9 & 10 Geo. 6. c. 15)
- The Public Health (Ireland) Act 1874 (37 & 38 Vict. c. 93)
- The Public Health (Ireland) Amendment Act 1879 (42 & 43 Vict. c. 57)
- The Public Health (Ireland) Amendment Act 1884 (47 & 48 Vict. c. 77)
- The Public Health (Ireland) Act 1900 (63 & 64 Vict. c. 10)
- The Public Health (Ireland) Act 1911 (1 & 2 Geo. 5. c. 12)

The Public Health Acts is the collective title of the following Acts:

- The Public Health Act 1875 (38 & 39 Vict. c. 55)
- The Public Health (Water) Act 1878 (41 & 42 Vict. c. 25)
- The Public Health (Interments) Act 1879 (42 & 43 Vict. c. 31)
- The Public Health (Fruit Picker's Lodgings) Act 1882 (45 & 46 Vict. c. 23)
- The Public Health Act 1875 (Support of Sewers) Amendment Act 1883 (46 & 47 Vict. c. 37)
- The Public Health (Confirmation of Byelaws) Act 1884 (47 & 48 Vict. c. 12)
- The Public Health (Officers) Act 1884 (47 & 48 Vict. c 74)
- The Public Health (Ships, &c.) Act 1885 (48 & 49 Vict. c 35)
- The Public Health (Members and Officers) Act 1885 (48 & 49 Vict. c. 53)
- Sections 7 to 10 of the Housing of the Working Classes Act 1885 (48 & 49 Vict. c. 72)
- The Public Health (Buildings in Streets) Act 1888 (51 & 52 Vict. c. 52)
- The Public Health Act 1889 (52 & 53 Vict. c. 64)
- The Public Health (Rating of Orchards) Act 1890 (53 & 54 Vict. c. 17)
- The Public Health Acts Amendment Act 1890 (53 & 54 Vict. c. 59)
- The Private Streets Works Act 1892 (55 & 56 Vict. c. 57)

The Public Health Acts 1936 and 1937 is the collective title of the Public Health Act 1936 (26 Geo. 5 & 1 Edw. 8. c. 49) and the Public Health (Drainage of Trade Premises) Act 1937.

The Public Health (Scotland) Acts 1897 and 1907 was the collective title of the Public Health (Scotland) Act 1897 (60 & 61 Vict. c. 38) and the Public Health (Scotland) Amendment Act 1907 (7 Edw. 7. c. 30).

The Public Health (Scotland) Acts 1897 to 1939 was the collective title of the Public Health (Scotland) Acts 1897 and 1907, and the Public Health (Coal Mine Refuse) (Scotland) Act 1939 (2 & 3 Geo. 6. c. 23).

The Public Health (Ireland) Acts is the collective title of the Public Health (Ireland) Act 1878 (41 & 42 Vict. c 52) and the Public Health Acts Amendment Act 1890 (53 & 54 Vict. c. 59).

The Public Health (Ireland) Acts 1878 to 1896 is the collective title of the Public Health (Ireland) Acts 1878 to 1890 and the Public Health (Ireland) Act 1896 (59 & 60 Vict. c. 54).

Public Health (Ireland) Acts 1878 to 1907 is the collective title of the Public Health (Ireland) Acts 1878 to 1900 and the Public Health Acts Amendment Act 1907 (7 Edw. 7. c. 53).

The Public Health (Ireland) Acts 1878 to 1917 is the collective title of the Public Health (Ireland) Acts 1878 to 1907 and the Public Health (Prevention and Treatment of Disease) Act 1917 (7 & 8 Geo. 5. c. 40).

The Public Health (Ireland) Acts 1878 to 1918 is collective title of the Public Health (Ireland) Acts 1878 to 1917 and the Public Health (Borrowing Powers) (Ireland) Act 1918 (8 & 9 Geo. 5. c. 35)

The Public Health (Ireland) Acts 1878 to 1919 is the collective title of the Public Health (Ireland) Acts 1878 to 1918 and the Public Health (Medical Treatment of Children) (Ireland) Act 1919 (9 & 10 Geo. 5. c. 16)

=== Northern Ireland ===
==== Acts of the Parliament of Northern Ireland ====
- The Public Health and Local Government (Miscellaneous Provisions) Act (Northern Ireland) 1949 (c. 21 (N.I.))
- The Public Health and Local Government (Miscellaneous Provisions) Act (Northern Ireland) 1955 (c. 13 (N.I.))
- The Public Health and Local Government (Miscellaneous Provisions) Act (Northern Ireland) 1962 (c. 12 (N.I.))
- The Public Health Act (Northern Ireland) 1967 (c. 36 (N.I.))

==== Act of the Northern Ireland Assembly ====
- The Public Health (Amendment) Act (Northern Ireland) 2008 (c. 5 (N.I.))

=== Scotland ===
==== Act of the Scottish Parliament ====
- The Public Health etc. (Scotland) Act 2008 (asp 5)

== See also ==
- List of short titles
