= Port Sanitary Authorities =

Port Sanitary Authorities were established in England under the 1872 Public Health Act.

By 1904 the Port of London had a medical officer of health and 10 sanitary inspectors. In 1905 they seized 3517 quarters and 1463 pieces of beef, 524 crates of rabbits, 5 cases and 1121 tins of canned meat, and 166,860 eggs, among other suspicious foodstuffs. Disposing of large quantities could be a problem. 18,399 diseased carcasses were dumped at sea in 1902 from one vessel.

The Port Sanitary Authorities (Infectious Diseases) Regulations, 1920 were issued by the Ministry of Health on 14 July 1920 and came into operation on 1 August of that year. They imposed additional duties upon Port Health Authorities and their Medical Officers of Health and contained a definition referring to 'any epidemic or acute infectious disease'.
