= List of acts of the Parliament of the United Kingdom from 1945 =

This is a complete list of acts of the Parliament of the United Kingdom for the year 1945.

Note that the first parliament of the United Kingdom was held in 1801; parliaments between 1707 and 1800 were either parliaments of Great Britain or of Ireland. For acts passed up until 1707, see the list of acts of the Parliament of England and the list of acts of the Parliament of Scotland. For acts passed from 1707 to 1800, see the list of acts of the Parliament of Great Britain. See also the list of acts of the Parliament of Ireland.

For acts of the devolved parliaments and assemblies in the United Kingdom, see the list of acts of the Scottish Parliament, the list of acts of the Northern Ireland Assembly, and the list of acts and measures of Senedd Cymru; see also the list of acts of the Parliament of Northern Ireland.

The number shown after each act's title is its chapter number. Acts passed before 1963 are cited using this number, preceded by the year(s) of the reign during which the relevant parliamentary session was held; thus the Union with Ireland Act 1800 is cited as "39 & 40 Geo. 3. c. 67", meaning the 67th act passed during the session that started in the 39th year of the reign of George III and which finished in the 40th year of that reign. Note that the modern convention is to use Arabic numerals in citations (thus "41 Geo. 3" rather than "41 Geo. III"). Acts of the last session of the Parliament of Great Britain and the first session of the Parliament of the United Kingdom are both cited as "41 Geo. 3". Acts passed from 1963 onwards are simply cited by calendar year and chapter number.

== 8 & 9 Geo. 6 ==
Continuing the tenth session of the 37th Parliament of the United Kingdom, which met from 29 November 1944 until 15 June 1945.

This session was also traditionally cited as 8 & 9 G. 6.

=== Public general acts ===
Short title	Citation	Royal assent
Long title
Consolidated Fund (No. 2) Act 1945 (repealed)	8 & 9 Geo. 6. c. 4	30 January 1945
An Act to apply certain sums out of the Consolidated Fund to the service of the years ending on the thirty-first day of March, one thousand nine hundred and forty-five and one thousand nine hundred and forty-six. (Repealed by Statute Law Revision Act 1950 (14 Geo. 6. c. 6))
Representation of the People Act 1945 (repealed)	8 & 9 Geo. 6. c. 5	15 February 1945
An Act to amend the law relating to parliamentary and local government franchises, and the registration of parliamentary and local government electors, to provide for the resumption of local elections, and otherwise to amend the law relating to parliamentary and local government elections, including the redistribution of seats at parliamentary elections. (Repealed by Statute Law (Repeals) Act 1978 (c. 45))
Nurses Act 1945 (repealed)	8 & 9 Geo. 6. c. 6	15 February 1945
An Act to exclude county and district nursing associations and other similar organizations from the operation of Part II of the Nurses Act, 1943, (Note: Nurses Act 1943 (6 & 7 Geo. 6. c. 17)) and Part II of the Nurses (Scotland) Act, 1943. (Note: Nurses (Scotland) Act 1943 (6 & 7 Geo. 6. c. 33)) (Repealed by Nurses (Scotland) Act 1951 (14 & 15 Geo. 6. c. 55) and Nurses Agencies Act 1957 (5 & 6 Eliz. 2. c. 16))
India (Estate Duty) Act 1945 (repealed)	8 & 9 Geo. 6. c. 7	7 March 1945
An Act to authorize the imposition of estate duties in India and to make provision as to the distribution of the net proceeds thereof. (Repealed by Statute Law (Repeals) Act 1976 (c. 16))
Road Transport Lighting (Cycles) Act 1945 (repealed)	8 & 9 Geo. 6. c. 8	7 March 1945
An Act to make obligatory the carrying by bicycles and tricycles not propelled by mechanical power of rear lamps, red reflectors and white surfaces during the hours of darkness, and to relax temporarily, as respects such vehicles when stationary owing to the exigencies of the traffic or in order to comply with any traffic signal or direction, the obligation to show lights. (Repealed by Road Transport Lighting Act 1957 (5 & 6 Eliz. 2. c. 51))
Export Guarantees Act 1945 (repealed)	8 & 9 Geo. 6. c. 9	7 March 1945
An Act to increase the limits imposed by the Export Guarantees Act, 1939, (Note: Export Guarantees Act 1939 (2 & 3 Geo. 6. c. 5)) upon the liability which may be undertaken by guarantees given under section one of that Act; to provide for the giving of guarantees for the purpose of encouraging the participation of the United Kingdom in external trade transactions; and for purposes connected therewith. (Repealed by Export Guarantees Act 1949 (12, 13 & 14 Geo. 6. c. 14))
Compensation of Displaced Officers (War Service) Act 1945 (repealed)	8 & 9 Geo. 6. c. 10	7 March 1945
An Act to provide for the compensation of persons who have been engaged in war service and are not reemployed or suffer loss of employment, reduction of emoluments or deterioration in their conditions of employment by reason of changes affecting the functions of local or public authorities or public utility undertakers or changes in the management of schools. (Repealed by Statute Law (Repeals) Act 2004 (c. 14))
Police (His Majesty's Inspectors of Constabulary) Act 1945 (repealed)	8 & 9 Geo. 6. c. 11	7 March 1945
An Act to remove the restriction upon the number of His Majesty's Inspectors of Constabulary that may be appointed under section fifteen of the County and Borough Police Act, 1856, (Note: County and Borough Police Act 1856 (19 & 20 Vict. c. 69)) or section sixty-five of the Police (Scotland) Act, 1857; (Note: Police (Scotland) Act 1857 (20 & 21 Vict. c. 72)) to provide for the appointment of Chief Inspectors for England and Wales and for Scotland respectively; and to amend the law as to the reports upon matters affecting the police which are to be laid annually before Parliament. (Repealed for Scotland by Police (Scotland) Act 1956 (4 & 5 Eliz. 2. c. 26) and for England and Wales by Police Act 1964 (c. 48))
Northern Ireland (Miscellaneous Provisions) Act 1945	8 & 9 Geo. 6. c. 12	7 March 1945
An Act to make miscellaneous amendments in the law applicable to Northern Ireland and, as respects securities issued or guaranteed by the Government of Northern Ireland, to amend certain enactments relating to trustees and savings banks.
Consolidated Fund (No. 3) Act 1945 (repealed)	8 & 9 Geo. 6. c. 13	28 March 1945
An Act to apply certain sums out of the Consolidated Fund to the service of the years ending on the thirty-first day of March, one thousand nine hundred and forty-five and one thousand nine hundred and forty-six. (Repealed by Statute Law Revision Act 1950 (14 Geo. 6. c. 6))
Teachers (Superannuation) Act 1945 (repealed)	8 & 9 Geo. 6. c. 14	28 March 1945
An Act to amend the definition of contributory service for the purposes of the Teachers (Superannuation) Act, 1925, (Note: Teachers (Superannuation) Act 1925 (15 & 16 Geo. 5. c. 59)) to extend the enactments relating to the superannuation of teachers to certain persons employed in connection with the provision of educational services otherwise than as teachers, and to make other amendments of the law relating to the superannuation of teachers and such persons as aforesaid. (Repealed by Statute Law Revision Act 1950 (14 Geo. 6. c. 6), Teachers (Superannuation) Act 1956 (4 & 5 Eliz. 2. c. 53), Teachers' Superannuation Act 1965 (c. 83) and Teachers' Superannuation Act 1967 (c. 12))
Licensing Planning (Temporary Provisions) Act 1945 (repealed)	8 & 9 Geo. 6. c. 15	28 March 1945
An Act to make temporary provision as to justices' licences in war-damaged areas and certain areas related to war-damaged areas. (Repealed by Licensing Act 1953 (1 & 2 Eliz. 2. c. 46))
Limitation (Enemies and War Prisoners) Act 1945	8 & 9 Geo. 6. c. 16	28 March 1945
An Act to provide for suspending the operation of certain statutes of limitation in relation to proceedings affecting persons who have been enemies or have been detained in enemy territory.
Wages Councils Act 1945 (repealed)	8 & 9 Geo. 6. c. 17	28 March 1945
An Act to provide for the establishment of wages councils, and otherwise for the regulation of the remuneration and conditions of employment of workers in certain circumstances. (Repealed by Wages Councils Act 1959 (7 & 8 Eliz. 2. c. 69))
Local Authorities Loans Act 1945	8 & 9 Geo. 6. c. 18	28 March 1945
An Act to prohibit the borrowing of money by local authorities otherwise than from the Public Works Loan Commissioners, to amend section five of the Public Works Loans Act, 1941, (Note: Public Works Loans Act 1941 (4 & 5 Geo. 6. c. 14)) and to make further provision with respect to local loans and the borrowing powers of local authorities.
Ministry of Fuel and Power Act 1945	8 & 9 Geo. 6. c. 19	25 April 1945
An Act to make further provision with respect to the appointment and functions of the Minister of Fuel and Power, and for purposes connected therewith.
Colonial Development and Welfare Act 1945 (repealed)	8 & 9 Geo. 6. c. 20	25 April 1945
An Act to increase the amounts payable out of moneys provided by Parliament for the purposes of schemes under section one of the Colonial Development and Welfare Act, 1940, (Note: Colonial Development and Welfare Act 1940 (3 & 4 Geo. 6. c. 40)) to extend the period during which certain of such schemes may continue in force, and to amend subsection (2) of the said section as respects the Aden Protectorate. (Repealed by Colonial Development and Welfare Act 1959 (7 & 8 Eliz. 2. c. 71))
Ministry of Civil Aviation Act 1945 (repealed)	8 & 9 Geo. 6. c. 21	25 April 1945
An Act to make provision for the appointment and functions of a Minister of Civil Aviation and for purposes connected therewith. (Repealed by Civil Aviation Act 1949 (12, 13 & 14 Geo. 6. c. 67) and Air Corporations Act 1949 (12, 13 & 14 Geo. 6. c. 91))
Army and Air Force (Annual) Act 1945 (repealed)	8 & 9 Geo. 6. c. 22	25 April 1945
An Act to provide, during twelve months, for the discipline and regulation of the Army and the Air Force. (Repealed by Statute Law Revision Act 1950 (14 Geo. 6. c. 6) and Revision of the Army and Air Force Acts (Transitional Provisions) Act 1955 (3 & 4 Eliz. 2. c. 20))
National Loans Act 1945 (repealed)	8 & 9 Geo. 6. c. 23	30 May 1945
An Act to extend the powers of the Treasury to raise money under section one of the National Loans Act, 1939, (Note: National Loans Act 1939 (2 & 3 Geo. 6. c. 117)) and to extend the powers of trustees of trustee savings banks to invest in securities issued to them under that Act moneys received by them in respect of special investments. (Repealed by National Loans Act 1968 (c. 13))
Finance Act 1945 (repealed)	8 & 9 Geo. 6. c. 24	15 June 1945
An Act to grant certain duties, to alter other duties, and to amend the law relating to the Public Revenue and the National Debt. (Repealed by Statute Law (Repeals) Act 2008 (c. 12))
Appropriation Act 1945 (repealed)	8 & 9 Geo. 6. c. 25	15 June 1945
An Act to apply a sum out of the Consolidated Fund to the service of the year ending on the thirty-first day of March, one thousand nine hundred and forty-six, and to appropriate the Supplies granted in this Session of Parliament. (Repealed by Statute Law Revision Act 1950 (14 Geo. 6. c. 6))
Camps Act 1945 (repealed)	8 & 9 Geo. 6. c. 26	15 June 1945
An Act to transfer the functions of the Minister of Health under the Camps Act, 1939, (Note: Camps Act 1939 (2 & 3 Geo. 6. c. 22)) to the Minister of Education. (Repealed by Statute Law (Repeals) Act 1973 (c. 39))
Welsh Church (Burial Grounds) Act 1945	8 & 9 Geo. 6. c. 27	15 June 1945
An Act to amend the provisions of the Welsh Church Act, 1914, (Note: Welsh Church Act 1914 (4 & 5 Geo. 5. c. 91)) relating to burial grounds and for purposes connected therewith.
Law Reform (Contributory Negligence) Act 1945	8 & 9 Geo. 6. c. 28	15 June 1945
An Act to amend the law relating to contributory negligence and for purposes connected therewith.
Liabilities (War-Time Adjustment) (Scotland) Act 1945 (repealed)	8 & 9 Geo. 6. c. 29	15 June 1945
An Act to provide for the arrangement or the adjustment and settlement of the affairs of persons in Scotland financially affected by war circumstance. (Repealed by Statute Law (Repeals) Act 1971 (c. 52))
Government of Burma (Temporary Provisions) Act 1945 (repealed)	8 & 9 Geo. 6. c. 30	15 June 1945
An Act to make temporary provision for the government of Burma. (Repealed by Burma Independence Act 1947 (11 & 12 Geo. 6. c. 3))
Emergency Powers (Defence) Act 1945 (repealed)	8 & 9 Geo. 6. c. 31	15 June 1945
An Act to make provision for the continuance of the Emergency Powers (Defence) Act, 1939, (Note: Emergency Powers (Defence) Act 1939 (2 & 3 Geo. 6. c. 62)) for periods of less than one year. (Repealed by Statute Law (Repeals) Act 1971 (c. 52))
Income Tax Act 1945 (repealed)	8 & 9 Geo. 6. c. 32	15 June 1945
An Act to amend the law relating to income tax in certain respects. (Repealed by Income Tax Act 1952 (15 & 16 Geo. 6 & 1 Eliz. 2. c. 10))
Town and Country Planning (Scotland) Act 1945 (repealed)	8 & 9 Geo. 6. c. 33	15 June 1945
An Act to make provision with respect to Scotland for the acquisition and development of land for planning purposes; for amending the law relating to town and country planning; for assessing by reference to 1939 prices compensation payable in connection with the acquisition of land for public purposes, and as to the rate of interest thereon; and for purposes connected with the matters aforesaid. (Repealed by Town and Country Planning (Scotland) Act 1972 (c. 52))
Hydro-Electric Undertakings (Valuation for Rating) (Scotland) Act 1945 (repealed)	8 & 9 Geo. 6. c. 34	15 June 1945
An Act to amend the law of Scotland with regard to the valuation for rating of hydro-electric undertakings and for purposes connected therewith. (Repealed by Local Government Act 1948 (11 & 12 Geo. 6. c. 26))
Forestry Act 1945 (repealed)	8 & 9 Geo. 6. c. 35	15 June 1945
An Act to make provision for the reconstitution of the Forestry Commission and as to the exercise of the functions of the Forestry Commissioners, the acquisition of land for forestry purposes and the management, use and disposal of land so acquired; and in connection with the matters aforesaid to amend the Forestry Acts, 1919 to 1927, and certain other enactments relating to the Forestry Commissioners. (Repealed by Forestry Act 1967 (c. 10))
Distribution of Industry Act 1945 (repealed)	8 & 9 Geo. 6. c. 36	15 June 1945
An Act to provide for the development of certain areas: for controlling the provision of industrial premises with a view to securing the proper distribution of industry; and for purposes connected with the matters aforesaid. (Repealed by Local Employment Act 1960 (8 & 9 Eliz. 2. c. 18))
Education (Scotland) Act 1945	8 & 9 Geo. 6. c. 37	15 June 1945
An Act to amend the law relating to education in Scotland.
Local Government (Boundary Commission) Act 1945 (repealed)	8 & 9 Geo. 6. c. 38	15 June 1945
An Act to provide for the establishment of a Local Government Boundary Commission; to make further provision for the alteration of local government areas in England and Wales exclusive of London; and for purposes connected with the matters aforesaid. (Repealed by Local Government Boundary Commission (Dissolution) Act 1949 (12, 13 & 14 Geo. 6. c. 83))
Housing (Temporary Accommodation) Act 1945 (repealed)	8 & 9 Geo. 6. c. 39	15 June 1945
An Act to authorise the use of open space during a limited period for temporary housing accommodation, and for purposes connected therewith. (Repealed for England and Wales by Housing Finance Act 1972 (c. 47) and for Scotland by Housing (Financial Provisions) (Scotland) Act 1972 (c. 46))
Postponement of Polling Day Act 1945 (repealed)	8 & 9 Geo. 6. c. 40	15 June 1945
An Act to postpone polling day in certain constituencies at the forthcoming general election. (Repealed by Statute Law Revision Act 1960 (8 & 9 Eliz. 2. c. 56))
Family Allowances Act 1945 (repealed)	8 & 9 Geo. 6. c. 41	15 June 1945
An Act to provide for the payment of family allowances. (Repealed by Statute Law Revision (Consequential Repeals) Act 1965 (c. 55))
Water Act 1945	8 & 9 Geo. 6. c. 42	15 June 1945
An Act to make provision for the conservation and use of water resources and for water supplies and for purposes connected therewith.
Requisitioned Land and War Works Act 1945	8 & 9 Geo. 6. c. 43	15 June 1945
An Act to authorise the acquisition of certain land used or dealt with for war purposes and to make other provision as to such land; to remove doubts as to the powers of certain Ministers to acquire land under the Defence Act, 1842; (Note: Defence Act 1842 (5 & 6 Vict. c. 94)) to amend certain of the enactments relating to compensation in respect of land; and for purposes connected with the matters aforesaid.
Treason Act 1945	8 & 9 Geo. 6. c. 44	15 June 1945
An Act to assimilate the procedure in all cases of treason and misprision of treason to the procedure in cases of murder. (Repealed for Northern Ireland by Criminal Law Act (Northern Ireland) 1967 (c. 18 (N.I.)) and for Scotland by Criminal Justice (Scotland) Act 1980 (c. 62))

=== Local acts ===
Short title	Citation	Royal assent
Long title
Ministry of Health Provisional Order Confirmation (Conway and Colwyn Bay Joint Water Supply Board) Act 1945	8 & 9 Geo. 6. c. iii	28 March 1945
An Act to confirm a Provisional Order of the Minister of Health relating to the Conway and Colwyn Bay Joint Water Supply Board.
	Conway and Colwyn Bay Joint Water Supply Order 1944 (Note: Although passed in 1945, the short title is specified as the Conway and Colwyn Bay Joint Water Supply Order 1944.) Conway and Colwyn Bay Joint Water Supply Board.	
Staffordshire Potteries Stipendiary Justice Act 1945 (repealed)	8 & 9 Geo. 6. c. iv	25 April 1945
An Act to amend the Staffordshire Potteries Stipendiary Justice Acts 1839 to 1895. (Repealed by Justices of the Peace Act 1949 (12, 13 & 14 Geo. 6. c. 101))
Commercial Gas Act 1945	8 & 9 Geo. 6. c. v	30 May 1945
An Act to require the Commercial Gas Company to promote a future Bill.
South Suburban Gas Act 1945	8 & 9 Geo. 6. c. vi	30 May 1945
An Act to require the Southern Suburban Gas Company to promote a future Bill.
Mersey Docks and Harbour Board Act 1945	8 & 9 Geo. 6. c. vii	30 May 1945
An Act to authorise the Mersey Docks and Harbour Board to construct further works and for other purposes.
Pontypool Gas and Water Act 1945	8 & 9 Geo. 6. c. viii	30 May 1945
An Act to empower the Pontypool Gas and Water Company to obtain further supplies of water and for other purposes.
Provisional Order (Marriages) Confirmation Act 1945 (repealed)	8 & 9 Geo. 6. c. ix	15 June 1945
An Act to confirm a Provisional Order made by one of His Majesty's Principal Secretaries of State under the Marriages Validity (Provisional Orders) Acts 1905 (Note: Provisional Order (Marriages) Act 1905 (5 Edw. 7. c. 23)) and 1924. (Note: Marriages Validity (Provisional Orders) Act 1924 (14 & 15 Geo. 5. c. 20)) (Repealed by Statute Law (Repeals) Act 1977 (c. 18))
	Church of Saint Mary Gravesend Order.	
Port Glasgow Gas and Burgh Order Confirmation Act 1945	8 & 9 Geo. 6. c. x	15 June 1945
An Act to Confirm a Provisional Order under the Private Legislation Procedure (Scotland) Act 1936 (Note: Private Legislation Procedure (Scotland) Act 1936 (26 Geo. 5 & 1 Edw. 8. c. 52)) relating to Port Glasgow Gas and Burgh.
	Port Glasgow Gas and Burgh Order 1945 Provisional Order to confer on the provost magistrates and councillors of the burgh of Port Glasgow further powers in connection with their gas undertaking and for the good government of the burgh and for other purposes.	
Ministry of Health Provisional Order Confirmation (Irwell Valley Water Board) Act 1945	8 & 9 Geo. 6. c. xi	15 June 1945
An Act to confirm a Provisional Order of the Minister of Health relating to the Irwell Valley Water Board.
	Irwell Valley Water Board Order 1945 Provisional Order extending the period limited by a local Act (Note: Bury and District Joint Water Board Act 1903 (3 Edw. 7. c. ccxxxiv)) for the redemption and extinction of certain perpetual annuities.	
Warrington Corporation Act 1945	8 & 9 Geo. 6. c. xii	15 June 1945
An Act to empower the mayor aldermen and burgesses of the borough of Warrington to construct works for the conveyance of coal to their electricity generating station and to appropriate and use portions of Bank Park for the extension of their town hall and municipal offices to make further provision with regard to the water undertaking of the Corporation and the health local government and improvement of the borough and for other purposes.
London County Council (Money) Act 1945 (repealed)	8 & 9 Geo. 6. c. xiii	15 June 1945
An Act to regulate the expenditure on capital account and lending of money by the London County Council during the financial period from the first day of April one thousand nine hundred and forty-five to the thirtieth day of September one thousand nine hundred and forty-six and for other purposes. (Repealed by London County Council (Loans) Act 1955 (4 & 5 Eliz. 2. c. xxvi))
South Shields Corporation Act 1945	8 & 9 Geo. 6. c. xiv	15 June 1945
An Act to confer further powers upon the mayor aldermen and burgesses of the borough of South Shields with respect to the running of trolley vehicles to confer further powers upon the Corporation with respect to their electricity undertaking to make further provision with regard to streets buildings sewers and drains and for the local government and improvement of the borough and for other purposes.

== 9 & 10 Geo. 6 ==
The first session of the 38th Parliament of the United Kingdom, which met from 1 August 1945 until 6 November 1946.

This session was also traditionally cited as 9 & 10 G. 6.

=== Public general acts ===
Short title	Citation	Royal assent
Long title
Local Elections (Service Abroad) Act 1945 (repealed)	9 & 10 Geo. 6. c. 1	24 August 1945
An Act to amend the law relating to local elections in its application to persons who are or have been engaged in service outside the United Kingdom. (Repealed by Statute Law Revision Act 1950 (14 Geo. 6. c. 6))
Indian Franchise Act 1945 (repealed)	9 & 10 Geo. 6. c. 2	24 October 1945
An Act to make temporary provision for the inclusion in electoral rolls in India of persons returned from war service, to relax residence qualifications for those persons and to extend certain Indian franchise qualifications which depend on service in His Majesty's forces or on the award of a pension. (Repealed by Statute Law (Repeals) Act 1976 (c. 16))
Coatbridge and Springburn Elections (Validation) Act 1945 (repealed)	9 & 10 Geo. 6. c. 3	24 October 1945
An Act to validate the election of Mrs. Jean Mann and John Forman, Esquire, to the House of Commons notwithstanding their holding the office of member of a tribunal under the Rent of Furnished Houses Control (Scotland) Act, 1943, (Note: Rent of Furnished Houses Control (Scotland) Act 1943 (6 & 7 Geo. 6. c. 44)) and to indemnify them from any penal consequences which they may have incurred by sitting and voting as members of that House. (Repealed by Representation of the People Act 1969 (c. 15))
Consolidated Fund (No. 1) Act 1945 (repealed)	9 & 10 Geo. 6. c. 4	31 October 1945
An Act to apply a sum out of the Consolidated Fund to the service of the year ending on the thirty-first day of March, one thousand nine hundred and forty-six. (Repealed by Statute Law Revision Act 1950 (14 Geo. 6. c. 6))
Indian Divorce Act 1945 (repealed)	9 & 10 Geo. 6. c. 5	31 October 1945
An Act to validate certain proceedings for dissolution of marriage in the High Court in Bombay. (Repealed by Statute Law (Repeals) Act 1976 (c. 16))
Chartered and Other Bodies (Resumption of Elections) Act 1945 (repealed)	9 & 10 Geo. 6. c. 6	10 December 1945
An Act to provide for the holding of elections of members or officers of certain bodies in cases where elections have been postponed under the Chartered and Other Bodies (Temporary Provisions) Acts, 1939 (Note: Chartered and Other Bodies (Temporary Provisions) Act 1939 (2 & 3 Geo. 6. c. 119)) and 1941; (Note: Chartered and Other Bodies (Temporary Provisions) Act 1941 (4 & 5 Geo. 6. c. 19)) for validating elections held after such postponement; for amending the said Acts and removing doubts arising thereon; and for purposes connected with the matters aforesaid. (Repealed by Statute Law Revision Act 1964 (c. 79))
British Settlements Act 1945	9 & 10 Geo. 6. c. 7	10 December 1945
An Act to enable the powers conferred by the British Settlements Act, 1887 (Note: British Settlements Act 1887 (50 & 51 Vict. c. 54)) on His Majesty in Council to be delegated as well by Order of His Majesty in Council as by an instrument passed under the Great Seal of the United Kingdom, and to amend the provisions of that Act with respect to the persons to whom those powers may be delegated.
War Damage (Valuation Appeals) Act 1945 (repealed)	9 & 10 Geo. 6. c. 8	10 December 1945
An Act to provide for the transfer, to a tribunal to be established for that purpose, of jurisdiction to determine appeals and references which under section thirty-two of the War Damage Act, 1943, (Note: War Damage Act 1943 (6 & 7 Geo. 6. c. 21)) may be made to a referee; and for purposes connected therewith. (Repealed by Statute Law Revision Act 1953 (2 & 3 Eliz. 2. c. 5))
Expiring Laws Continuance Act 1945 (repealed)	9 & 10 Geo. 6. c. 9	10 December 1945
An Act to continue certain expiring laws. (Repealed by Statute Law Revision Act 1950 (14 Geo. 6. c. 6))
Supplies and Services (Transitional Powers) Act 1945 (repealed)	9 & 10 Geo. 6. c. 10	10 December 1945
An Act to provide for the application of certain Defence Regulations for purposes connected with the maintenance control and regulation of supplies and services, for enabling Defence Regulations to be made for the control of prices and charges, for the continuation of Defence Regulations so applied or made during a limited period notwithstanding the expiry of the Emergency Powers (Defence) Acts, 1939 to 1945, and for the amendment of other enactments in consequence of such continuation; to make provision for securing more effective Parliamentary control over Defence Regulations and orders and other instruments made thereunder; to provide for applying during a limited period certain powers of the Minister of Supply for purposes similar to those for which Defence Regulations may be applied and otherwise for amending those powers; and for purposes connected with the matters aforesaid. (Repealed by Emergency Laws (Repeal) Act 1959 (7 & 8 Eliz. 2. c. 19))
Inshore Fishing Industry Act 1945 (repealed)	9 & 10 Geo. 6. c. 11	10 December 1945
An Act to authorise the provision of financial assistance to inshore fishermen and persons desiring to engage in the inshore fishing industry. (Repealed by Sea Fisheries Act 1968 (c. 77))
Civil Defence (Suspension of Powers) Act 1945 (repealed)	9 & 10 Geo. 6. c. 12	10 December 1945
An Act to suspend certain provisions of the Civil Defence Acts, 1937 (Note: Air-Raid Precautions Act 1937 (1 & 2 Geo. 6. c. 6)) and 1939. (Note: Civil Defence Act 1939 (2 & 3 Geo. 6. c. 31)) (Repealed by Statute Law (Repeals) Act 1976 (c. 16))
Finance (No. 2) Act 1945	9 & 10 Geo. 6. c. 13	20 December 1945
An Act to grant certain duties, to alter other duties, and to amend the law relating to the Public Revenue and the National Debt, and to make further provision in connection with Finance.
Isle of Man (Customs) Act 1945 (repealed)	9 & 10 Geo. 6. c. 14	20 December 1945
An Act to amend the law with respect to customs in the Isle of Man. (Repealed by Statute Law Revision Act 1950 (14 Geo. 6. c. 6))
Public Health (Scotland) Act 1945	9 & 10 Geo. 6. c. 15	20 December 1945
An Act to consolidate with amendments the provisions of Part IV of the Public Health (Scotland) Act, 1897, (Note: Public Health (Scotland) Act 1897 (60 & 61 Vict. c. 38)) as amended by the Public Health Act, 1904, (Note: Public Health Act 1904 (4 Edw. 7. c. 16)) relating to epidemic, endemic or infectious diseases.
Workmen's Compensation (Pneumoconiosis) Act 1945 (repealed)	9 & 10 Geo. 6. c. 16	20 December 1945
An Act to make provision for disregarding, for the purposes of certain time limits in schemes made under section forty-seven of the Workmen's Compensation Act, 1925, (Note: Workmen's Compensation Act 1925 (15 & 16 Geo. 5. c. 84)) periods of war service or war employment. (Repealed by National Insurance (Industrial Injuries) Act 1946 (9 & 10 Geo. 6. c. 62))
Police (Overseas Service) Act 1945	9 & 10 Geo. 6. c. 17	20 December 1945
An Act to provide for the maintenance of British civil police forces in certain countries and territories outside the United Kingdom; for the discipline and pensions of members of such forces; and for purposes connected therewith.
Statutory Orders (Special Procedure) Act 1945	9 & 10 Geo. 6. c. 18	20 December 1945
An Act to regulate the procedure to be followed in connection with statutory orders required by any future enactment to be subject to special parliamentary procedure; to apply such procedure to orders made under certain existing enactments; and to enable such procedure to be applied to certain other orders.
Bretton Woods Agreements Act 1945 (repealed)	9 & 10 Geo. 6. c. 19	20 December 1945
An Act to enable effect to be given to certain international agreements for the establishment and operation of an International Monetary Fund and an International Bank for Reconstruction and Development, and for purposes connected with the matters aforesaid. (Repealed by Overseas Development and Co-operation Act 1980 (c. 63))
Building Materials and Housing Act 1945 (repealed)	9 & 10 Geo. 6. c. 20	20 December 1945
An Act to make financial provision for the purpose of facilitating the production, equipment, repair, alteration and acquisition of houses and other buildings, and to make provision for limiting the price for which certain houses may be sold and the rent at which certain houses may be let. (Repealed by Statute Law (Repeals) Act 1981 (c. 19))
Elections and Jurors Act 1945 (repealed)	9 & 10 Geo. 6. c. 21	20 December 1945
An Act to amend the law relating to electoral registration and to voting at parliamentary and local government elections; to make provision with respect to jurors books; to amend the law relating to returning officers for Scottish constituencies; and to provide for matters connected with the purposes aforesaid. (Repealed by Representation of the People Act 1948 (11 & 12 Geo. 6. c. 65))

=== Local acts ===
Short title	Citation	Royal assent
Long title
Newcastle-upon-Tyne Corporation (Trolley Vehicles) Order Confirmation Act 1945 (repealed)	9 & 10 Geo. 6. c. i	31 October 1945
An Act to confirm a Provisional Order made by the Minister of War Transport under the Newcastle-upon-Tyne Corporation (General Powers) Act 1935 (Note: Newcastle-upon-Tyne Corporation (General Powers) Act 1935 (25 & 26 Geo. 5. c. cxxiv)) relating to Newcastle-upon-Tyne trolley vehicles. (Repealed by Tyne and Wear Act 1980 (c. xliii))
	Newcastle-upon-Tyne Corporation (Trolley Vehicles) Order 1945 Order authorising the lord mayor aldermen and citizens of the city and county of Newcastle-upon-Tyne to use trolley vehicles upon additional routes in the said city and county and in the county borough of Gateshead in the county of Durham.	
Ministry of Health Provisional Order Confirmation (Weston-super-Mare) Act 1945	9 & 10 Geo. 6. c. ii	10 December 1945
An Act to confirm a Provisional Order of the Minister of Health relating to the borough of Weston-super-Mare.
	Weston-super-Mare Order 1945 Provisional Order altering a local Act. (Note: Weston-super-Mare Improvement Commissioners Water Act 1878 (41 & 42 Vict. c. clxxxv))	
Ministry of Health Provisional Order Confirmation (Doncaster) Act 1945	9 & 10 Geo. 6. c. iii	10 December 1945
An Act to confirm a Provisional Order of the Minister of Health relating to the county borough of Doncaster.
	Doncaster Order 1945 Provisional Order amending certain local Acts and provisional orders.	
Weaver Navigation Act 1945	9 & 10 Geo. 6. c. iv	10 December 1945
An Act to empower the Weaver Navigation Trustees to acquire lands to extend the jurisdiction of the Trustees and for other purposes.
Wadebridge Urban District Council Act 1945 (repealed)	9 & 10 Geo. 6. c. v	10 December 1945
An Act to revive the powers of the Wadebridge Rural District Council for the construction of waterworks and for other purposes. (Repealed by North Cornwall Water Board Order 1960 (SI 1960/2259))
North Devon Water Board Act 1945	9 & 10 Geo. 6. c. vi	10 December 1945
An Act to constitute a joint board consisting of representatives of the county council of the administrative county of Devon and the rural district councils of Barnstaple Bideford Broadwoodwidger Crediton Holsworthy Okehampton Saint Thomas South Molton Tavistock and Torrington and the mayor aldermen and burgesses of the borough of Barnstaple to vest in the said board the water undertakings of certain constituent authorities and the undertaking of the Barnstaple Water Company to authorise the board to execute works and to supply water and for other purposes.
Mid-Southern Utility Act 1945	9 & 10 Geo. 6. c. vii	10 December 1945
An Act to confer further powers on the Mid Southern Utility Company with respect to their water undertaking and for other purposes.
Colne Valley Water Act 1945	9 & 10 Geo. 6. c. viii	10 December 1945
An Act to authorise the Colne Valley Water Company to construct new works and to raise additional capital and for other purposes.
Gloucester Corporation Act 1945	9 & 10 Geo. 6. c. ix	10 December 1945
An Act to extend the limits for the supply of water by the mayor aldermen and citizens of the city of Gloucester in the county of the city of Gloucester and to make further provision with regard to their water undertaking to provide for the inclusion of members of the council of the said city in the standing joint committee of the quarter sessions and the council of the administrative county of Gloucester and for other purposes.
Reigate Corporation Act 1945 (repealed)	9 & 10 Geo. 6. c. x	10 December 1945
An Act to provide for the dissolution of the conservators appointed by the Commons Regulation (Redhill and Earlswood Commons) Provisional Order Confirmation Act 1884 (Note: Commons Regulation (Redhill and Earlswood Commons) Provisional Order Confirmation Act 1884 (47 & 48 Vict. c. l)) and for the transfer of the powers and duties of the said conservators to the mayor aldermen and burgesses of the borough of Reigate to confer further powers on the Corporation in regard to their electricity undertaking lands and other matters to make further and better provision for the improvement health local government and finances of the borough and for other purposes. (Repealed by Surrey Act 1985 (c. iii))
Manchester Ship Canal Act 1945 (repealed)	9 & 10 Geo. 6. c. xi	10 December 1945
An Act to amend the Manchester Ship Canal (Staff Superannuation) Act 1926 (Note: Manchester Ship Canal (Staff Superannuation) Act 1926 (16 & 17 Geo. 5. c. xc)) to confer further powers upon the Manchester Ship Canal Company and for other purposes. (Repealed by Manchester Ship Canal Harbour Revision Order 2009 (SI 2009/2579))
East Grinstead Gas and Water Act 1945	9 & 10 Geo. 6. c. xii	20 December 1945
An Act to provide for the conversion and consolidation of the existing capital of the East Grinstead Gas and Water Company to authorise the Company to raise additional capital to confer further powers upon the Company with reference to their gas and water undertakings and for other purposes.
Wallasey Corporation Act 1945	9 & 10 Geo. 6. c. xiii	20 December 1945
An Act to provide that the mayor aldermen and burgesses of the borough of Wallasey are not required to maintain a service of steam or other boats for the transport of carriages cattle goods and merchandise as part of their Seacombe Ferry to authorise the transfer to the Corporation of the undertaking of the Wallasey Embankment Commissioners to extend the limits of the Corporation for the supply of water and for other purposes.
Plympton St. Mary Rural District Council Act 1945	9 & 10 Geo. 6. c. xiv	20 December 1945
An Act to authorise the Plympton St. Mary Rural District Council to construct additional waterworks to confer further powers on the Council in regard to their water and electricity undertakings and to make further provision for the improvement health local government and finances of the rural district and for other purposes.

== See also ==
- List of acts of the Parliament of the United Kingdom
