= Public Health Act 1904 =

Act of the Parliament of the United Kingdom

Public Health Act 1904 (Note: Section 2.)
- Act of Parliament
- Parliament of the United Kingdom
- Long title: An Act to enable Regulations to be made for carrying into effect conventions with respect to the prevention of danger arising to public health from vessels, and the prevention of the conveyance of infection by means of vessels.
- Citation: 4 Edw. 7. c. 16
- Territorial extent: United Kingdom; Isle of Man; (Note: Section 1(3).)

Dates
- Royal assent: 15 August 1904
- Commencement: 15 August 1904 (Note: The Acts of Parliament (Commencement) Act 1793.)
- Repealed: England and Wales: 1 October 1937; Scotland: 20 December 1945; Northern Ireland and Isle of Man: 1 January 1970
Other legislation
Amends	Public Health Act 1896
Repealed by	England and Wales: Public Health Act 1936; Scotland: Public Health (Scotland) Act 1945; Northern Ireland and Isle of Man: Statute Law (Repeals) Act 1969

Status: Repealed

Text of statute as originally enacted

The Public Health Act 1904 (4 Edw. 7. c. 16) was an act of the Parliament of the United Kingdom. It is one of the Public Health Acts.

== Background ==
In the November 1902 issue of National Review Conservative Party, Lord Salisbury wrote an article titled "Labourers' and Artisans' Dwellings" in which he argued that the poor conditions of working class were injurious to morality and health. "Laissez-faire is an admirable doctrine but it must be applied on both sides", Salisbury argued, as Parliament had enacted new building projects (such as the Thames Embankment) which had displaced working-class people and was responsible for "packing the people tighter":

...thousands of families have only a single room to dwell in, where they sleep and eat, multiply, and die... It is difficult to exaggerate the misery which such conditions of life must cause, or the impulse they must give to vice. The depression of body and mind which they create is an almost insuperable obstacle to the action of any elevating or refining agencies.

In response to this article the Pall Mall Gazette argued that Salisbury had sailed into "the turbid waters of State Socialism"; the Manchester Guardian said his article was "State socialism pure and simple" and The Times claimed Salisbury was "in favour of state socialism".

On 4 March 1903 a Royal Commission on the Housing of the Working Classes was set up under the leadership of Sir Charles Dilke, including Salisbury, the Prince of Wales, Cardinal Manning, Henry Broadhurst, George Goschen, Jesse Collings, Bishop of Bedford, and Richard Cross as members. It held 51 meetings, met twice a week in spring and summer of 1903, heard from witnesses, asked 18,000 questions, toured the slums and interviewed doctors, policemen, Poor Law Board officials, clergymen, government officials and vestry sanitary committee chairmen. Its Report was published in December 1903 and contained a mixture of Salisbury's proposals for government loans and subsidies and the more collectivist Dilke-Chamberlain ideas of increasing the local councils' powers. Salisbury dissented from the majority Report because he considered it too reminiscent of Chamberlainite "expropriation" and produced his own minority Report.

== Provisions ==
Richard Cross, the Home Secretary, introduced the bill into the House of Commons on 23 July 1903 and Salisbury did the same in the House of Lords. The act allowed county districts to get loans from HM Treasury on the security of the rates. The Local Government Board was granted the power to force local authorities to shut down unhealthy houses, making landlords personally liable for their tenants' health, and the act also made it illegal for landlords to let property which was below elementary sanitary standards.

The purpose of the act was to eliminate housing constructions in London that posed public health threats, including the spread of cholera and typhus. Since sewage was flowing and overwhelming the streets (including permeating houses), the act sought to fix the problem. The act required all new residential construction to include "running water and an internal drainage system." This act also prohibited the government to build poor-quality housing by building contractors. The act also stated that every public health authority had to have a doctor and a sanitary inspector, to ensure the other sanitation, food, and health laws were carried out.

Many factors delayed reform, however, such as the fact that to perform a cleanup, the government would need money, and this would have to come from factory owners, who were not keen to pay, and this further delayed reform. But reformers eventually helped to counteract the government's laissez-faire attitude, and a Public Health bill was introduced in 1904. Home Secretary Richard Cross was responsible for drafting the legislation, and received much good will from trades union groups in the consequent years for "humanising the toil of the working man".

The act also meant that towns had to have pavements and street lighting.

== Subsequent developments ==
The whole act was repealed for England and Wales by section 346(1)(b) of, and the fifth part of the third schedule to, the Public Health Act 1936 (26 Geo. 5 & 1 Edw. 8. c. 49), which came into force on 1 January 1937.

The whole act was repealed for Scotland by section 2 of the Public Health (Scotland) Act 1945 (9 & 10 Geo. 6. c. 15), which came into force on 20 December 1945.

The whole act, so far as unrepealed, was repealed by section 1 of, and part VII of the schedule to, the Statute Law (Repeals) Act 1969, which came into force on 1 January 1970.

== Bibliography ==
- Halsbury's Statutes. Third Edition. Volume 26. Page 38.
- Thomas Whiteside Hime. Public Health: The Practical Guide to the Public Health Act, 1904, and Correlated Acts, for the Use of Medical Officers of Health and Inspectors of Nuisances. Bailliere, Tindall and Cox. 1906. Internet Archive.
- William Cunningham Glen and Alexander Glen. The Public Health Act, 1904, and the Law relating to Public Health, Local Government, and Urban and Rural Sanitary Authorities. Eighth Edition. Butterworths. Knight & Co. London. 1934. Internet Archive.
- James C Stevens. The Public Health Act 1904: Arranged in a Dictionary Index Form. Shaw and Sons. London. 1942. Internet Archive.
- Robert Rawlinson. The Public Health Act 1904: Suggestions as to the Preparation of District Maps, and of Plans for the Main Sewerage, Drainage, and Water Supply (Revised to 1956). HMSO. London. 1923. Internet Archive (the description of this book, on that webpage, as another work by William Glen is erroneous).
- World History 4th Edition by William J. Duiker and Jackson J. Spielvogel
- Brindley, J. M. (1916). The homes of the working classes and the promises of the Right Hon. Joseph Chamberlain (1915) by J. M. Brindley. Westminster: National Union of Conservative and Constitutional Associations.
