= Public Health Act 1936 =

Act of the Parliament of the United Kingdom

Public Health Act 1936 (Note: Section 347(1).)
- Act of Parliament
- Parliament of the United Kingdom
- Long title: An Act to consolidate with amendments certain enactments relating to public health.
- Citation: 26 Geo. 5 & 1 Edw. 8. c. 49
- Territorial extent: England and Wales (Note: Section 347(3).)

Dates
- Royal assent: 31 July 1936
- Commencement: 1 October 1937 (Note: Section 347(1).)
Other legislation
Amends	See § Repealed enactments
Repeals/revokes	See § Repealed enactments
Amended by	Factories Act 1937; Public Health (Coal Mine Refuse) Act 1939; Rural Water Supplies and Sewerage Act 1944; Water Act 1945; Town and Country Planning Act 1947; Local Government Act 1948; National Assistance Act 1948; Statute Law Revision Act 1950; Clean Air Act 1956; Charities Act 1960; Public Health Act 1961; Nursing Homes Act 1963; London Government Act 1963; Offices, Shops and Railway Premises Act 1963; Local Government Act 1966; National Loans Act 1968; Local Government Act 1972; Control of Pollution Act 1974; Nursing Homes Act 1975; Local Government (Miscellaneous Provisions) Act 1976; National Health Service Act 1977; Public Health (Control of Disease) Act 1984; Building Act 1984; Housing (Consequential Provisions) Act 1985; Water Consolidation (Consequential Provisions) Act 1991; Statute Law (Repeals) Act 1993; Local Government (Wales) Act 1994; Statute Law (Repeals) Act 1995; Gas Act 1995; Statute Law (Repeals) Act 2004
Relates to	Public Health (London) Act 1936

Status: Partially repealed

Text of statute as originally enacted

Revised text of statute as amended

Text of the Public Health Act 1936 as in force today (including any amendments) within the United Kingdom, from legislation.gov.uk.

The Public Health Act 1936 (26 Geo. 5 & 1 Edw. 8. c. 49) is an act of the Parliament of the United Kingdom. As of 1973, it was the principal act on the subject of public health. Its provisions repeal and re-enact most earlier statutes on that subject. It is one of the Public Health Acts 1936 and 1937.

== Provisions ==
=== Repealed enactments ===
Section 346(1)(a) of act repealed the Public Health Act 1875 (38 & 39 Vict. c. 55), the Public Health Acts Amendment Act 1890 (38 & 39 Vict. c. 55), the Public Health Acts Amendment Act 1907 (7 Edw. 7. c. 53) and the Public Health Act 1925 (15 & 16 Geo. 5. c. 71) to the extent specified in the first, second, third and fourth parts of the third schedule to the act.

Section 346(1)(b) of the act repealed 59 enactments for England and Wales, listed in the fifth part of the third schedule to the act.

Citation	Short title	Extent of repeal
2 & 3 Vict. c. 71	Metropolitan Police Courts Act 1839	Section forty-one.
3 & 4 Vict. c. 85	Chimney Sweepers and Chimneys Regulation Act 1840	Section six.
9 & 10 Vict. c. 74	Baths and Wash-houses Act 1846	The whole act.
10 & 11 Vict. c. 61	Baths and Wash-houses Act 1847	The whole act.
15 & 16 Vict. c. 84	Metropolis Water Act 1852	Section fourteen.
16 & 17 Vict. c. 134	Burial Act 185	Section seven, so far as it relates to the power to provide mortuaries conferred by section forty-two of the Burial Act, 1852, on persons other than burial boards.
34 & 35 Vict. c. 70	Local Government Board Act 1871	In Part I of the Schedule, the references to Baths and Washhouses and to 9 & 10 Vict. c. 74, and 10 & 11 Vict. c. 61.
37 & 38 Vict. c. 89	Sanitary Law Amendment Act 1874	The whole act so far as it applies to the metropolitan police district outside London.
39 & 40 Vict. c. 36	Customs Consolidation Act 1876	Section two hundred and thirty-four.
39 & 40 Vict. c. 75	Rivers Pollution Prevention Act 1876	Section seven.
40 & 41 Vict. c. 60	Canal Boats Act 1877	The whole act, except sections twelve, sixteen and seventeen.
41 & 42 Vict. c. 14	Baths and Wash-houses Act 1878	The whole act.
41 & 42 Vict. c. 25	Public Health (Water) Act 1878	The whole act.
45 & 46 Vict. c. 23	Public Health (Fruit Pickers' Lodgings) Act 1882	The whole act.
45 & 46 Vict. c. 30	Baths and Wash-houses Act 1882	The whole act.
46 & 47 Vict. c. 59	Epidemic and Other Diseases Prevention Act 1883	The whole act.
47 & 48 Vict. c. 12	Public Health (Confirmation of Byelaws) Act 1884	Section three, so far as it relates to byelaws made under section sixty-nine of the Town Police Clauses Act, 1847, by virtue of its incorporation with the Public Health Act, 1848, the Local Government Act, 1858, or the Public Health Act, 1875.
47 & 48 Vict. c. 75	Canal Boats Act 1884	The whole act.
48 & 49 Vict. c. 35	Public Health (Ships, &c) Act 1885	The whole act.
48 & 49 Vict. c. 72	Housing of the Working Classes Act 1885	Sections seven to ten.
51 & 52 Vict. c. 41	Local Government Act 1888	Section nineteen.
52 & 53 Vict. c. 72	Infectious Disease (Notification) Act 1889	The whole act.
53 & 54 Vict. c. 34	Infectious Disease (Prevention) Act 1890	Sections five to fifteen and seventeen.
54 & 55 Vict. c. 76	Public Health (London) Act 1891	Sections eighty-two to eighty-seven ; subsection (1) of section one hundred and five, so far as it relates to epidemic regulations; section one hundred and thirteen, and in Schedule 1 the paragraphs reproducing sections 130,134, 135, and 140 of the Public Health Act, 1875.
56 & 57 Vict. c. 68	Isolation Hospitals Act 1893	The whole act.
56 & 57 Vict. c. ccxxi	London County Council (General Powers) Act 1893	Section thirteen.
56 & 57 Vict. c. 73	Local Government Act 1894	In section seven, the words " (b) the Baths and Wash-houses Acts, 1846 to 1882"; in section eight, paragraphs (e) and (f) of subsection (1) and subsection (3); in section sixteen, subsection (1) so far as regards functions of a rural district council which are functions under this Act, and subsection (3); in section twenty-five, subsections (1) and (7) so far as regards functions of a council which are functions under this Act, and section sixty-three to the like extent.
59 & 60 Vict. c. 19	Public Health Act 1896	The whole act.
59 & 60 Vict. c. 20	Public Health (Ports) Act 1896	The whole act.
60 & 61 Vict. c. 31	Cleansing of Persons Act 1897	The whole act.
62 & 63 Vict. c. 8	Infectious Disease (Notification) Extension Act 1899	The whole act.
62 & 63 Vict. c. 29	Baths and Wash-houses Act 1899	The whole act.
1 Edw. 7. c. 8	Isolation Hospitals Act 1901	The whole act.
1 Edw. 7. c. 22	Factory and Workshop Act 1901	Subsection (2) of section one; subsections (1) and (2) of section two; in subsection(3) of section seven the words from " and a workshop " to the end of the subsection; in subsection (4) of section nine the words from " or to anyplace " to the end of the subsection; sections sixty-one, one hundred and nine and one hundred and ten.
4 Edw. 7. c. 16	Public Health Act 1904	The whole act.
6 Edw. 7. c. 33	Local Authorities (Treasury Powers) Act 1906	In subsection (1) of section one the words " the Baths " and Washhouses Acts, " 1846 to 1899 or "
7 Edw. 7. c. 40	Notification of Births Act 1907	The whole act.
8 Edw. 7. c. 67	Children Act 1908	Part I.
9 Edw. 7. c. 44	Housing, Town Planning, etc. Act 1909	Section seventy-one.
1 & 2 Geo. 5. c. 55	National Insurance Act 1911	Section sixty-four.
3 & 4 Geo. 5. c. 23	Public Health (Prevention and Treatment of Disease) Act 1913	The whole act.
3 & 4 Geo. 5. c. 37	National Insurance Act 1913	Subsection (2) of section forty-two.
5 & 6 Geo. 5. c. 64	Notification of Birth (Extension) Act 1915	The whole act.
6 & 7 Geo. 5. c. 12	Local Government (Emergency Provisions) Act 1916	Section five.
8 & 9 Geo. 5. c. 29	Maternity and Child Welfare Act 1918	The whole act.
9 & 10 Geo. 5. c. 21	Ministry of Health Act 1919	In section three, paragraph (f) of subsection (1).
9 & 10 Geo. 5. c. 35	Housing, Town Planning, &c., Ac,191	In subsection (4) of section twenty-four, the words "new buildings and," and section twenty-five.
11 & 12 Geo. 5. c. 12	Public Health (Tuberculosis) Act 1921	The whole act except section six.
11 & 12 Geo. 5. c. 23	Public Health (Officers) Act 1921	The whole act.
11 & 12 Geo. 5. c. 51	Education Act 192	In section one hundred and sixty-six, the words from the beginning of the section to " plans and sections, and ".
15 & 16 Geo. 5. c. 14	Housing Act 192	In section one hundred and one, the words " or buildings ".
16 & 17 Geo. 5. c. 43	Public Health (Smoke Abatement) Act 1926	The whole act, except sections four and twelve.
16 & 17 Geo. 5. c. 48	Births and Deaths Registration Act 1926	In section nine, paragraph (b).
17 & 18 Geo. 5. c. 38	Nursing Homes Registration Act 1927	The whole act.
19 & 20 Geo. 5. c. 17	Local Government Act 1929	In section two the words " infant life protection and " and paragraph (a); section thirteen; subjections (1), (2) and (3) of section fourteen; section sixteen; in section fifty-seven, subsection (1) and subsections (2) and (3) so far as regards functions relating to public health which are functions under this Act; sections fifty-nine to sixty-one and sixty-three; in section seventy-seven, subsection (2) so far as regards water rates under this Act; in subsection (1) of section one hundred and twenty-eight the words from " or by any scheme " to " infectious disease "; in Schedule 1, the references in Parts H and V to section forty-seven of the Public Health Acts Amendment Act, 1907; and paragraph 3 of Schedule HI.
20 & 21 Geo. 5. c. 17	Poor Law Act 193	In paragraph (c) of section sixty-seven, the words " for providing nurses or ".
22 & 23 Geo. 5. c. 46	Children and Young Persons Act 1932	Sections sixty-five to sixty-nine and the Second Schedule so far as it relates to sections one, two, three, eight and nine of the Children Act, 1908.
23 & 24 Geo. 5. c. 12	Children and Young Persons Act 1933	In subsection (1) of section ninety-eight the words " or " under Part I of the " Children Act, 1908 ".
23 & 24 Geo. 5. c. 51	Local Government Act 1933	Subsection (2) of section one hundred and fifty-nine, so far as it relates to purposes which are purposes of this Act, and in section three hundred and five, in the definition of " adoptive Acts " the words " (b) the " Baths and Washhouses "Acts, 1846 to 1925".

Section 346(1)(b) of the act repealed 10 enactments for London, listed in the sixth part of the third schedule to the act.

Citation	Short title	Extent of repeal
39 & 40 Vict. c. 36	Customs Consolidation Act 1876	Section two hundred and thirty-four.
40 & 41 Vict. c. 60	Canal Boats Act 1877	The whole act, except sections twelve, sixteen and seventeen.
46 & 47 Vict. c. 59	Epidemic and other Diseases Prevention Act 1883	The whole act.
47 & 48 Vict. c. 75	Canal Boats Act 1884	The whole act.
54 & 55 Vict. c. 76	Public Health (London) Act 1891	Sections eighty-two to eighty-seven ; subsection (1) of section one hundred and five, so far as it relates to epidemic regulations; section one hundred and thirteen, and in Schedule 1 the paragraphs reproducing sections 130, 134, 135 and 140 of the Public Health Act, 1875.
56 & 57 Vict. c. ccxxi	London County Council (General Powers) Act 1893	Section thirteen.
59 & 60 Vict. c. 19	Public Health Act 1896	The whole act.
4 Edw. 7.c. 1	Public Health Act 1904	The whole act.
3 & 4 Geo. 5. c. 23	Public Health (Prevention and Treatment of Disease) Act 1913	Section two and section four, so far as it relates to expenses incurred under section two.
11 & 12 Geo. 5. c. 12	Public Health (Tuberculosis) Act 1921	Section seven.
19 & 20 Geo. 5. c. 17	Local Government Act 1929	In section fifty-nine the words from " or any regulations " to " 1891 ".

Section 346(1)(b) of the act repealed 2 enactments for Northern Ireland, the Isle of Man and the Channel Islands, listed in the seventh part of the third schedule to the act.

Citation	Short title	Extent of repeal
39 & 40 Vict. c. 36	Customs Consolidation Act 1876	Section two hundred and thirty-four.
59 & 60 Vict. c. 19	Public Health Act 1896	Section two.

== Part I ==
=== Section 1 ===
In section 1(1)(a), the words "or community" were repealed by sections 22(3) and 66(8) of, and paragraph 3(1) of schedule 9 to, and schedule 18 to, the Local Government (Wales) Act 1994.

=== Section 2 ===
This section was repealed by section 78(b) of, and schedule 3 to the Public Health (Control of Disease) Act 1984.

=== Section 3 ===
This section was repealed by section 78(b) of, and schedule 3 to the Public Health (Control of Disease) Act 1984. The proviso to section 3(2) was repealed by section 272(1) of, and schedule 30 to, the Local Government Act 1972. Section 3(3) was repealed by section 272(1) of, and schedule 30 to, the Local Government Act 1972.

=== Section 4 ===
This section was repealed by section 78(b) of, and schedule 3 to the Public Health (Control of Disease) Act 1984. The proviso to section 4(1) was repealed by section 272(1) of, and schedule 30 to, the Local Government Act 1972. Section 4(2) was repealed by section 272(1) of, and schedule 30 to, the Local Government Act 1972.

=== Section 5 ===
This section was repealed by section 78(b) of, and schedule 3 to the Public Health (Control of Disease) Act 1984.

=== Section 6 ===
Section 6(3), from "and power" onwards, was repealed by section 48(2) of, and part II of the seventh schedule to, the Charities Act 1960.

=== Section 7 ===
The proviso to section 7(1) was repealed by section 272(1) of, and schedule 30 to, the Local Government Act 1972.

=== Section 8 ===
This section was repealed by section 272(1) of, and schedule 30 to, the Local Government Act 1972. Section 8(2), from "and power" onwards, was repealed by section 48(2) of, and part II of the seventh schedule to, the Charities Act 1960.

=== Section 9 ===
In section 9(1), the words "port health district, or a" were repealed by section 78(b) of, and schedule 3 to the Public Health (Control of Disease) Act 1984. In section 9(2), the words "the port health authority or" were repealed by section 78(b) of, and schedule 3 to the Public Health (Control of Disease) Act 1984. In section 9(3), the words "port health district" were repealed by section 78(b) of, and schedule 3 to the Public Health (Control of Disease) Act 1984.

=== Section 10 ===
The words "port health authority or" were repealed by section 78(b) of, and schedule 3 to the Public Health (Control of Disease) Act 1984.

=== Sections 11 to 13 ===
Sections 11 to 13 were repealed by section 272(1) of, and schedule 30 to, the Local Government Act 1972.

== Part II ==
=== Section 14 ===
This section was repealed by section 40(3) of, and schedule 9 to, the Water Act 1973.

=== Section 15 ===
This section was repealed by section 190(3) of, and part I of schedule 27 to, the Water Act 1989.

=== Section 16 ===
This section was repealed by section 40(3) of, and schedule 9 to, the Water Act 1973.

=== Sections 17 and 18 ===
These sections were repealed by section 3(1) of, and part I of schedule 3 to, the Water Consolidation (Consequential Provisions) Act 1991.

=== Section 19 ===
This section was repealed by section 3(1) of, and part I of schedule 3 to, the Water Consolidation (Consequential Provisions) Act 1991. In section 19(2), the words from “and if” onwards were repealed by section 190(3) of, and part I of schedule 27 to, the Water Act 1989.

=== Section 20 ===
This section was repealed by section 190(3) of, and part I of schedule 27 to, the Water Act 1989. The proviso to section 20(2) was repealed by section 40(3) of, and schedule 9 to, the Water Act 1973.

=== Sections 21 and 22 ===
These sections were repealed by section 3(1) of, and part I of schedule 3 to, the Water Consolidation (Consequential Provisions) Act 1991.

=== Sections 23 and 24 ===
These sections were repealed by section 190(3) of, and part I of schedule 27 to, the Water Act 1989.

=== Section 25 ===
This section was repealed by section 133(2) of, and schedule 7 to, the Building Act 1984. Section 25(3) was repealed by section 86(3) of, and part I of the fifth schedule to, the Public Health Act 1961.

=== Section 26 ===
This section was repealed by section 1(3) of the Public Health (Drainage of Trade Premises) Act 1937.

=== Section 27 ===
This section was repealed by section 3(1) of, and part I of schedule 3 to, the Water Consolidation (Consequential Provisions) Act 1991.

=== Section 28 ===
This section was repealed by section 40(3) of, and schedule 9 to, the Water Act 1973.

=== Section 29 ===
This section was repealed by section 190(3) of, and part I of schedule 27 to, the Water Act 1989.

=== Sections 30 and 31 ===
These sections were repealed by section 3(1) of, and part I of schedule 3 to, the Water Consolidation (Consequential Provisions) Act 1991.

=== Section 32 ===
This section was repealed by section 190(3) of, and part I of schedule 27 to, the Water Act 1989.

=== Section 34 ===
This section was repealed by section 3(1) of, and part I of schedule 3 to, the Water Consolidation (Consequential Provisions) Act 1991.

=== Section 35 ===
This section was repealed by section 40(3) of, and schedule 9 to, the Water Act 1973.

=== Section 36 ===
This section was repealed by section 3(1) of, and part I of schedule 3 to, the Water Consolidation (Consequential Provisions) Act 1991. The words "or by an arbitrator" in section 36(1) were repealed by section 190(3) of, and part I of schedule 27 to, the Water Act 1989.

=== Sections 37 to 40 ===
These sections were repealed by section 133(2) of, and schedule 7 to, the Building Act 1984.

=== Section 41 ===
This section was repealed by section 133(2) of, and schedule 7 to, the Building Act 1984. In section 41(1), the words from the beginning to "this Act" were repealed by section 40(3) of, and schedule 9 to, the Water Act 1973.

=== Section 42 ===
This section was repealed by section 3(1) of, and part I of schedule 3 to, the Water Consolidation (Consequential Provisions) Act 1991.

=== Section 43 ===
This section was repealed by section 133(2) of, and schedule 7 to, the Building Act 1984.

=== Section 44 ===
This section was repealed by section 133(2) of, and schedule 7 to, the Building Act 1984. The words "to which section nine of the Factory and Workshop Act, 1901, applies" in section 44(3) were repealed by section 159(1) of, and the fourth schedule to, the Factories Act 1937. The words "to a shop to which the Shops Act, 1934, applies, or" in section 44(3) were repealed by section 91(4) of, and schedule 2 to, the Offices, Shops and Railway Premises Act 1963.

=== Section 45 ===
The words "to which section nine of the Factory and Workshop Act, 1901, applies" in section 45(4) were repealed by section 159(1) of, and the fourth schedule to, the Factories Act 1937. The words "to a shop to which the Shops Act, 1934, applies, or" in section 45(4) were repealed by section 91(4) of, and schedule 2 to, the Offices, Shops and Railway Premises Act 1963. The words "or workshop" in section 45(4) were repealed by section 1(1) of, and group 3 of part I of schedule 1 to, the Statute Law (Repeals) Act 1993, which came into force on 5 November 1993.

=== Section 46 ===
This section was repealed by section 133(2) of, and schedule 7 to, the Building Act 1984. The words "factory, workshop, or" in section 46(1) were repealed by section 159(1) of, and the fourth schedule to, the Factories Act 1937. Section 46(4) was repealed by section 91(4) of, and schedule 2 to, the Offices, Shops and Railway Premises Act 1963. Section 46(5) was repealed by section 159(1) of, and the fourth schedule to, the Factories Act 1937.

=== Section 47 ===
This section was repealed by section 133(2) of, and schedule 7 to, the Building Act 1984.

=== Section 48 ===
The words "directly or" in section 48(1) were repealed by section 3(1) of, and part I of schedule 3 to, the Water Consolidation (Consequential Provisions) Act 1991. Section 48(1A) was repealed by section 3(1) of, and part I of schedule 3 to, the Water Consolidation (Consequential Provisions) Act 1991.

=== Section 50 ===
The words "or the water authority for the area" in section 50(1) were repealed by section 190(3) of, and part I of schedule 27 to, the Water Act 1989.

=== Section 61 ===
The word "estimates" in section 61(2) was repealed by section 86(3) of, and part I of the fifth schedule to, the Public Health Act 1961. Section 61(3) was repealed by section 86(3) of, and part I of the fifth schedule to, the Public Health Act 1961.

=== Sections 53 to 57 ===
These sections were repealed by section 133(2) of, and schedule 7 to, the Building Act 1984.

=== Section 58 ===
This section was repealed by section 133(2) of, and schedule 7 to, the Building Act 1984. In section 58(1), the words from "to persons in the building" to the end of the first paragraph (b), the words "in the first-mentioned case", and paragraph (ii), were repealed by section 86(3) of, and part II of the fifth schedule to, the Public Health Act 1961. Section 58(3) was repealed by section 86(3) of, and part II of the fifth schedule to, the Public Health Act 1961.

=== Sections 59 to 62 ===
These sections were repealed by section 133(2) of, and schedule 7 to, the Building Act 1984.

=== Section 63 ===
This section was repealed by section 86(3) of, and part I of the fifth schedule to, the Public Health Act 1961.

=== Sections 64 to 65 ===
These sections were repealed by section 133(2) of, and schedule 7 to, the Building Act 1984.

=== Section 66 ===
This section was repealed by section 133(2) of, and schedule 7 to, the Building Act 1984. Section 66(1)(a) was repealed by section 86(3) of, and part II of the fifth schedule to, the Public Health Act 1961. Sections 66(2) and (3) were repealed by section 86(3) of, and part I of the fifth schedule to, the Public Health Act 1961.

=== Section 67 ===
This section was repealed by section 133(2) of, and schedule 7 to, the Building Act 1984.

=== Sections 68 and 69 ===
These sections were repealed by section 86(3) of, and part I of the fifth schedule to, the Public Health Act 1961.

=== Section 70 ===
This section was repealed by section 133(2) of, and schedule 7 to, the Building Act 1984. Section 70(1)(a) and (b) were repealed by section 272(1) of, and schedule 30 to, the Local Government Act 1972. In section 70(1)(b), the words from the beginning to "thirty-one, and", the words "or section fifteen of the Public Health Acts Amendment Act, 1907", and the words "in question", were repealed by section 86(3) of, and part I of the fifth schedule to, the Public Health Act 1961.

=== Section 71 ===
This section was repealed by section 133(2) of, and schedule 7 to, the Building Act 1984. Section 70(1)(b) was repealed by section 272(1) of, and schedule 30 to, the Local Government Act 1972.

=== Sections 72 to 76 ===
These sections were repealed by section 108(2) of, and schedule 4 to, the Control of Pollution Act 1974.

=== Section 77 ===
In section 77(2)(b), the words from "or, in case of dispute" to the end were repealed by section 272(1) of, and schedule 30 to, the Local Government Act 1972.

=== Sections 79 and 80 ===
These sections are repealed by section 108(2) of, and schedule 4 to, the Control of Pollution Act 1974.

=== Section 87 ===
The words "or community" in section 87(1) were repealed by section 126(2) of, and paragraph 1(2)(b) of schedule 4 to, the Public Health (Wales) Act 2017. The words "other than urinals" in section 87(3)(c) were repealed by article 3 of the Sex Discrimination (Amendment of Legislation) Regulations 2008 (SI 2008/963).

=== Section 88 ===
This section was repealed by section 133(2) of, and schedule 7 to, the Building Act 1984.

=== Section 89 ===
This section was repealed by section 81(1) of, and schedule 2 to, the Local Government (Miscellaneous Provisions) Act 1976.

=== Section 90 ===
The definition of sewerage authority in section 90(1) was repealed by section 40(3) of, and schedule 9 to, the Water Act 1973. Section 90(3) was repealed by section 133(2) of, and schedule 7 to, the Building Act 1984. In section 90(4), the words from "and any reference" onwards, repealed by section 3(1) of, and part I of schedule 3 to, the Water Consolidation (Consequential Provisions) Act 1991. Section 90(5) was repealed by section 3(1) of, and part I of schedule 3 to, the Water Consolidation (Consequential Provisions) Act 1991. Section 90(6) was repealed by section 133(2) of, and schedule 7 to, the Building Act 1984.

== Bibliography ==
- Dougall Meston. The Public Health Act, 1936, with an Introduction, Notes, Incorporated Enactments, and Index. Sweet & Maxwell Ltd. London. 1937. Catalogue. Reviewed at Annual Survey of English Law 1937, p 81.
- Harold Beck Williams. The Public Health Act, 1936. Butterworth & Co (Publishers). London. 1937. Reviewed at Annual Survey of English Law 1937, p 81; (1938) 5 Labour 46; Arnold Pallister (1937) 17 The Town Planning Review 218
- Ethel Bright Ashford (ed). Glen's Public Health Act, 1936, being the Fifteenth Edition of Glen's Public Health. Eyre and Spottiswoode. London. 1936. Catalogue. Reviewed at Annual Survey of English Law 1937, p 81.
- David Joy Beattie. The Public Health Act 1936. Foreword by Gwilym Gibbon. The Solicitors' Law Stationery Society, Limited. London, Liverpool and Birmingham. 1937. Google Books.
- Harry Samuels and Philip Fores. The Public Health Act, 1936. Sir Isaac Pitman & Sons, Ltd. London. 1938. Google Books.
- Halsbury's Statutes. Third Edition. Volume 26. Page 189.
