= Public Health Act 1961 =

Act of the Parliament of the United Kingdom

Public Health Act 1961 (Note: Section 86(1).)
- Act of Parliament
- Parliament of the United Kingdom
- Long title: An Act to amend the provisions of the Public Health Act, 1936, relating to building byelaws, to make such amendments of the law relating to public health and the functions of county councils and other local authorities as are commonly made in local Acts, to amend the law relating to trade effluents and to amend section two hundred and forty-nine of the said Act of 1936.
- Citation: 9 & 10 Eliz. 2. c. 64
- Territorial extent: England and Wales (Note: Section 3.)

Dates
- Royal assent: 3 August 1961
- Commencement: 3 October 1961 (except for part II relating to building regulations) (Note: Section 86(2)(a).); 1 February 1966 (Note: Section 86(2)(b). The Public Health Act 1961 (Commencement) Order 1965.)
Other legislation
Amends	Public Health Act 1936; Statistics of Trade Act 1947
Amended by	London Government Act 1963; New Towns Act 1965; London Government Order 1966; Highways Act 1971; Local Government Act 1972; Water Act 1973; Statute Law (Repeals) Act 1974; Control of Pollution Act 1974; Statute Law (Repeals) Act 1976; Highways Act 1980; Litter Act 1983; Public Health (Control of Disease) Act 1984; Building Act 1984; Water Act 1989; Statute Law (Repeals) Act 1989; Environmental Protection Act 1990; Water Consolidation (Consequential Provisions) Act 1991; Coal Industry Act 1994; Statute Law (Repeals) Act 2004; Environmental Permitting (England and Wales) Regulations 2007; Natural Resources Body for Wales (Functions) Order 2013

Status: Partially repealed

Text of statute as originally enacted

Revised text of statute as amended

Text of the Public Health Act 1961 as in force today (including any amendments) within the United Kingdom, from legislation.gov.uk.

The Public Health Act 1961 (9 & 10 Eliz. 2. c. 64) is an act of the Parliament of the United Kingdom. Together with certain other Acts, it amends and amplifies the Public Health Act 1936.

== Section 1 ==
Section 1(2) was repealed by section 78(b) of, and schedule 3 to, the Public Health (Control of Disease) Act 1984. Section 1(3) was repealed by section 3(1) of, and Part I of Schedule 3 to, the Water Consolidation (Consequential Provisions) Act 1991. Section 1(3) from "and references" onwards was repealed by section 93(1) of, and Part II of Schedule 18 to, the London Government Act 1963.

== Section 2 ==
The words "or rural" in section 2(3) were repealed by section 272(1) of, and Schedule 30 to, the Local Government Act 1972.

== Section 3 ==
This section from "or save" onwards was repealed by section 93(1) of, and Part II of Schedule 18 to, the London Government Act 1963.

== Sections 4 and 5 ==
These sections were repealed by section 133(2) of, and Schedule 7 to, the Building Act 1984.

== Section 6 ==
This section was repealed by section 133(2) of, and Schedule 7 to, the Building Act 1984. Section 6(8) was repealed by Part XI of the Schedule to the Statute Law (Repeals) Act 1974.

== Sections 7 to 9 ==
These sections were repealed by section 133(2) of, and Schedule 7 to, the Building Act 1984.

== Section 10 ==
This section was repealed by section 133(2) of, and Schedule 7 to, the Building Act 1984. Sections 10(1), (3) and (6) were repealed by Part XI of the Schedule to the Statute Law (Repeals) Act 1974.

== Section 11 ==
This section was repealed by section 133(2) of, and Schedule 7 to, the Building Act 1984.

== Sections 12 to 14 ==
These sections were repealed by section 190(3) of, and Part I of Schedule 27 to, the Water Act 1989.

== Section 15 ==
This section was repealed by section 40(3) of, and Schedule 9 to, the Water Act 1973.

== Section 16 ==
This section was repealed by section 272(1) of, and Schedule 30 to, the Local Government Act 1972.

== Sections 17 and 18 ==
A new section 17 was substituted for sections 17 and 18 by section 27(1) of the Local Government (Miscellaneous Provisions) Act 1982.

== Sections 19 to 21 ==
These sections were repealed by section 133(2) of, and Schedule 7 to, the Building Act 1984.

== Section 23 ==
This section was repealed by section 133(2) of, and Schedule 7 to, the Building Act 1984.

== Section 24 ==
This section was repealed by section 133(2) of, and Schedule 7 to, the Building Act 1984. The words from "and accordingly" onwards in section 24(1) were repealed by Part XI of the Schedule to the Statute Law (Repeals) Act 1974. Section 24(2) was repealed by Part XI of the Schedule to the Statute Law (Repeals) Act 1974.

== Section 25 ==
This section was repealed by section 133(2) of, and Schedule 7 to, the Building Act 1984. Section 25(10) was repealed by Part XI of the Schedule to the Statute Law (Repeals) Act 1974.

== Sections 26 to 33 ==
These sections were repealed by section 133(2) of, and Schedule 7 to, the Building Act 1984.

== Section 34 ==
The words "or waste deposited in accordance with a disposal licence in force under Part I of the Control of Pollution Act 1974" in section 34(5) were repealed by regulation 74(2) of, and Schedule 23 to, the Environmental Permitting (England and Wales) Regulations 2007 (SI 2007/3538).

== Sections 38 and 39 ==
These sections were repealed by section 78(b) of, and Schedule 3 to, the Public Health (Control of Disease) Act 1984.

== Section 40 ==
This sections was repealed by section 78(b) of, and Schedule 3 to, the Public Health (Control of Disease) Act 1984. The words "on the advice of their medical officer of health" in section 40(2) were repealed by section 272(1) of, and Schedule 30 to, the Local Government Act 1972.

== Sections 41 and 42 ==
These sections were repealed by section 78(b) of, and Schedule 3 to, the Public Health (Control of Disease) Act 1984.

== Sections 43 and 44 ==
These sections were repealed by section 343(3) of, and Schedule 25 to, the Highways Act 1980.

== Sections 46 to 50 ==
These sections were repealed by section 343(3) of, and Schedule 25 to, the Highways Act 1980.

== Section 51 ==
This section was repealed by section 12(3) of, and Schedule 2 to, the Litter Act 1983. The proviso to section 51(1) was repealed by section 272(1) of, and Schedule 30 to, the Local Government Act 1972.

== Section 52 ==
Section 52(1) from "and section three" onwards was repealed by Part IV of Schedule 1 to the Statute Law (Repeals) Act 1989.

== Section 53 ==
Section 53(2) from "and sections three" onwards was repealed by Part IV of Schedule 1 to the Statute Law (Repeals) Act 1989. Section 53(5) was repealed by Part IV of Schedule 1 to the Statute Law (Repeals) Act 1989.

== Section 54 ==
Section 54(6) from "and sections three" onwards was repealed by Part IV of Schedule 1 to the Statute Law (Repeals) Act 1989. Section 54(8) repealed by section 272(1) of, and Schedule 30 to, the Local Government Act 1972.

== Sections 55 to 57 ==
These sections were repealed by section 108(2) of, and Schedule 4 to, the Control of Pollution Act 1974.

== Section 58 ==
This section was repealed by Part XI of the Schedule to the Statute Law (Repeals) Act 1974. This section was also repealed by section 108(2) of, and Schedule 4 to, the Control of Pollution Act 1974.

== Section 59 ==
This section was repealed by section 3(1) of, and Part I of Schedule 3 to, the Water Consolidation (Consequential Provisions) Act 1991.

== Section 60 ==
This section was repealed by section 3(1) of, and Part I of Schedule 3 to, the Water Consolidation (Consequential Provisions) Act 1991. The words "under subsection (3) of section 2 of the Act of 1937" in section 60(1) were repealed by section 190(3) of, and Part I of Schedule 27 to, the Water Act 1989. Section 60(3) was repealed by section 190(3) of, and Part I of Schedule 27 to, the Water Act 1989.

== Section 61 ==
This section was repealed by section 3(1) of, and Part I of Schedule 3 to, the Water Consolidation (Consequential Provisions) Act 1991. The words from "by a direction" to "date, or" in section 60(1), and the words from "or vary" to "against" in section 60(5), were repealed by section 190(3) of, and Part I of Schedule 27 to, the Water Act 1989.

== Section 62 ==
This section was repealed by section 3(1) of, and Part I of Schedule 3 to, the Water Consolidation (Consequential Provisions) Act 1991. The words "the Act of 1937 or" in section 62(1) were repealed by section 190(3) of, and Part I of Schedule 27 to, the Water Act 1989.

== Section 63 ==
This section was repealed by section 3(1) of, and Part I of Schedule 3 to, the Water Consolidation (Consequential Provisions) Act 1991. Section 63(5) was repealed by section 108(2) of, and Schedule 4 to, the Control of Pollution Act 1974.

== Section 64 ==
This section was repealed by section 3(1) of, and Part I of Schedule 3 to, the Water Consolidation (Consequential Provisions) Act 1991.

== Section 65 ==
This section was repealed by section 40(3) of, and Schedule 9 to, the Water Act 1973.

== Sections 66 to 68 ==
These sections were repealed by section 3(1) of, and Part I of Schedule 3 to, the Water Consolidation (Consequential Provisions) Act 1991.

== Section 69 ==
Section 69(1) was repealed by section 3(1) of, and Part I of Schedule 3 to, the Water Consolidation (Consequential Provisions) Act 1991.

== Section 70 ==
This section was repealed by section 190(3) of, and Part I of Schedule 27 to, the Water Act 1989.

== Section 71 ==
This section was repealed by section 93(1) of, and Part II of Schedule 18 to, the London Government Act 1963.

== Section 72 ==
This section was repealed by section 162(2) of, and Part III of Schedule 16 to, the Environmental Protection Act 1990.

== Section 75 ==
Section 75(4) was repealed by section 81(1) of, and Schedule 2 to, the Local Government (Miscellaneous Provisions) Act 1976.

== Section 76 ==
Section 76(3) was repealed by section 81(1) of, and Schedule 2 to, the Local Government (Miscellaneous Provisions) Act 1976.

== Section 78 ==
This section was repealed by section 5(4) of the Water Act 1981.

== Section 79 ==
This section was repealed by Part XI of the Schedule to the Statute Law (Repeals) Act 1974. Section 79(2) was repealed by section 93(1) of, and Part II of schedule 18 to, the London Government Act 1963.

== Section 80 ==
This section was repealed by section 81(1) of, and schedule 2 to, the Local Government (Miscellaneous Provisions) Act 1976.

== Section 81 ==
The words "or by the Greater London Council" were repealed by section 102 of, and schedule 17 to, the Local Government Act 1985.

== Section 84 ==
The words from "Subsection (3)" to "to new towns)" in section 84(1) were repealed by section 56(3) of, and schedule 12 to, the New Towns Act 1965.

== Section 86 ==
Section 86(2) was repealed by Part 13 of schedule 1 to the Statute Law (Repeals) Act 2004. Section 86(3) was repealed by Part XI of the schedule to the Statute Law (Repeals) Act 1974.

== Schedule 1 ==
This schedule was repealed by section 133(2) of, and Schedule 7 to, the Building Act 1984. The entries relating to the Highways Act 1959 (7 & 8 Eliz. 2. c. 25) in part III were repealed by section 343(3) of, and schedule 25 to, the Highways Act 1980. The words "in the administrative county of London or", the words "in subsection (6) of section thirty-two, and", and the words "to London and" in the last paragraph of the amendments of the Clean Air Act 1956 were repealed by section 93(1) of, and Part II of Schedule 18 to, the London Government Act 1963.

== Subsequent developments ==
Sections 6(8), 10(1), (3) and (6), 25(10), 58, 79 and 86(3) of, and schedule 5 to, the act, together with parts of section 24, were repealed by section 1 of, and part XI of the schedule to, the Statute Law (Repeals) Act 1974, which came into force on 27 June 1974.

Schedule 2 to the act was repealed by section 190(3) of, and part I of schedule 27 to, the Water Act 1989, which came into force on 6 July 1989.

The reference to the British Coal Corporation in the table in schedule 4 of the act was repealed by section 67(8) of, and part IV of schedule 11 to, the Coal Industry Act 1994. The entry relating to the provision of a universal postal service was repealed by schedule 2 to the Postal Services Act 2000 (Consequential Modifications) Order 2003 (SI 2003/2908), which came into force on 12 November 2003.

== See also ==
- Public Health Act
- UK enterprise law

== Bibliography ==
- Halsbury's Statutes. Third Edition. Volume 26. Page 500.
- Annotated Legislation Service. Volume 130.
- Graham Wilson. The Public Health Act, 1961. Butterworth and Company (Publishers) Limited. London. 1962. [Reprint of Butterworths Annotated Legislation Service Statutes Supplement, volume 130].
- John Francis Garner. Shaw's Guide to the Public Health Act 1961. Shaw & Sons Ltd. London. 1961. Reviewed at 233 The Law Times 78; The Municipal Review, May 1962, p 337; (1962) 70 The Municipal Journal 375 (9 February); (1962) 59 Law Society's Gazette 276
