= Housing of the Working Classes Act 1885 =

Act of the Parliament of the United Kingdom

Housing of the Working Classes Act 1885 (Note: Section 17.)
- Act of Parliament
- Parliament of the United Kingdom
- Long title: An Act to amend the Law relating to Dwellings of the Working Classes.
- Citation: 48 & 49 Vict. c. 72
- Introduced by: Richard Cross, Home Sec. (HoC); Marquess of Salisbury, PM (HL)
- Territorial extent: United Kingdom

Dates
- Royal assent: 14 August 1885
- Commencement: 14 August 1885 (Note: The Acts of Parliament (Commencement) Act 1793.)
- Repealed: Scotland: 21 May 1981; England and Wales: 8 November 1995
Other legislation
Amended by	Housing of the Working Classes Act 1890; Public Health (London) Act 1891; Local Government Act 1933; Public Health Act 1936; London Government Act 1963
Repealed by	Scotland: Statute Law (Repeals) Act 1981; England and Wales: Statute Law (Repeals) Act 1995

Status: Partially repealed

Text of statute as originally enacted

Text of the Housing of the Working Classes Act 1885 as in force today (including any amendments) within the United Kingdom, from legislation.gov.uk.

The Housing of the Working Classes Act 1885 (48 & 49 Vict. c. 72) is an act of the Parliament of the United Kingdom. Sections 7 to 10 of the act are amongst the enactments which may be cited as the Public Health Acts.

== Background ==
In the November 1883 issue of National Review Conservative Party leader Lord Salisbury wrote an article titled "Labourers' and Artisans' Dwellings" in which he argued that the poor conditions of working class housing were injurious to morality and health. "Laissez-faire is an admirable doctrine but it must be applied on both sides", Salisbury argued, as Parliament had enacted new building projects (such as the Thames Embankment) which had displaced working-class people and was responsible for "packing the people tighter":

Thousands of families have only a single room to dwell in, where they sleep and eat, multiply, and die... It is difficult to exaggerate the misery which such conditions of life must cause, or the impulse they must give to vice. The depression of body and mind which they create is an almost insuperable obstacle to the action of any elevating or refining agencies.

In response to this article the Pall Mall Gazette argued that Salisbury had sailed into "the turbid waters of State Socialism"; the Manchester Guardian said his article was "State socialism pure and simple" and The Times claimed Salisbury was "in favour of state socialism".

On 4 March 1884 a Royal Commission on the Housing of the Working Classes was set up under the leadership of Sir Charles Dilke, including Salisbury, the Prince of Wales, Cardinal Manning, Henry Broadhurst, George Goschen, Jesse Collings, Bishop of Bedford, and Richard Cross as members. It held 51 meetings, met twice a week in spring and summer of 1884, heard from witnesses, asked 18,000 questions, toured the slums and interviewed doctors, policemen, Poor Law Board officials, clergymen, government officials and vestry sanitary committee chairmen. Its Report was published in 1885 and contained a mixture of Salisbury's proposals for government loans and subsidies and the more collectivist Dilke-Chamberlain ideas of increasing the local councils' powers. Salisbury dissented from the majority Report because he considered it too reminiscent of Chamberlainite "expropriation" and produced his own minority Report.

== Provisions ==
Richard Cross, the Home Secretary, introduced the Bill into the House of Commons on 24 July 1885 and Salisbury did the same in the House of Lords. The act allowed county districts to get loans from HM Treasury on the security of the rates. The Local Government Board was granted the power to force local authorities to shut down unhealthy houses, making landlords personally liable for their tenants' health, and the act also made it illegal for landlords to let property which was below elementary sanitary standards.

== Criticism ==
The act was criticised by Lord Wemyss and his Liberty and Property Defence League as "class legislation" and Wemyss asked whether the government would now house the police and Foreign Office clerks. He further claimed that the act would be "strangling the spirit of independence and the self-reliance of the people, and destroying the moral fibre of our race in the anaconda coils of state socialism". Salisbury responded: "Do not imagine that by merely affixing to it the reproach of Socialism you can seriously affect the progress of any great legislative movement, or destroy those high arguments which are derived from the noblest principles of philanthropy and religion".

== Subsequent developments ==
The whole act except sections 3 and 7–8, and except section 10 so far as it relates to byelaws authorised by those sections, was repealed by section 102 of, and the seventh schedule to, the Housing of the Working Classes Act 1890 (53 & 54 Vict. c. 70), which came into force on 18 August 1890.

The whole act was repealed for England and Wales by section 1(1) of, and part VI of schedule 1 to, the Statute Law (Repeals) Act 1995, which came into force on 8 November 1995.

== See also ==
- Decimus Alfred Ball "House farmer" mentioned in the Royal Commission reports.
