= Decimus Alfred Ball =

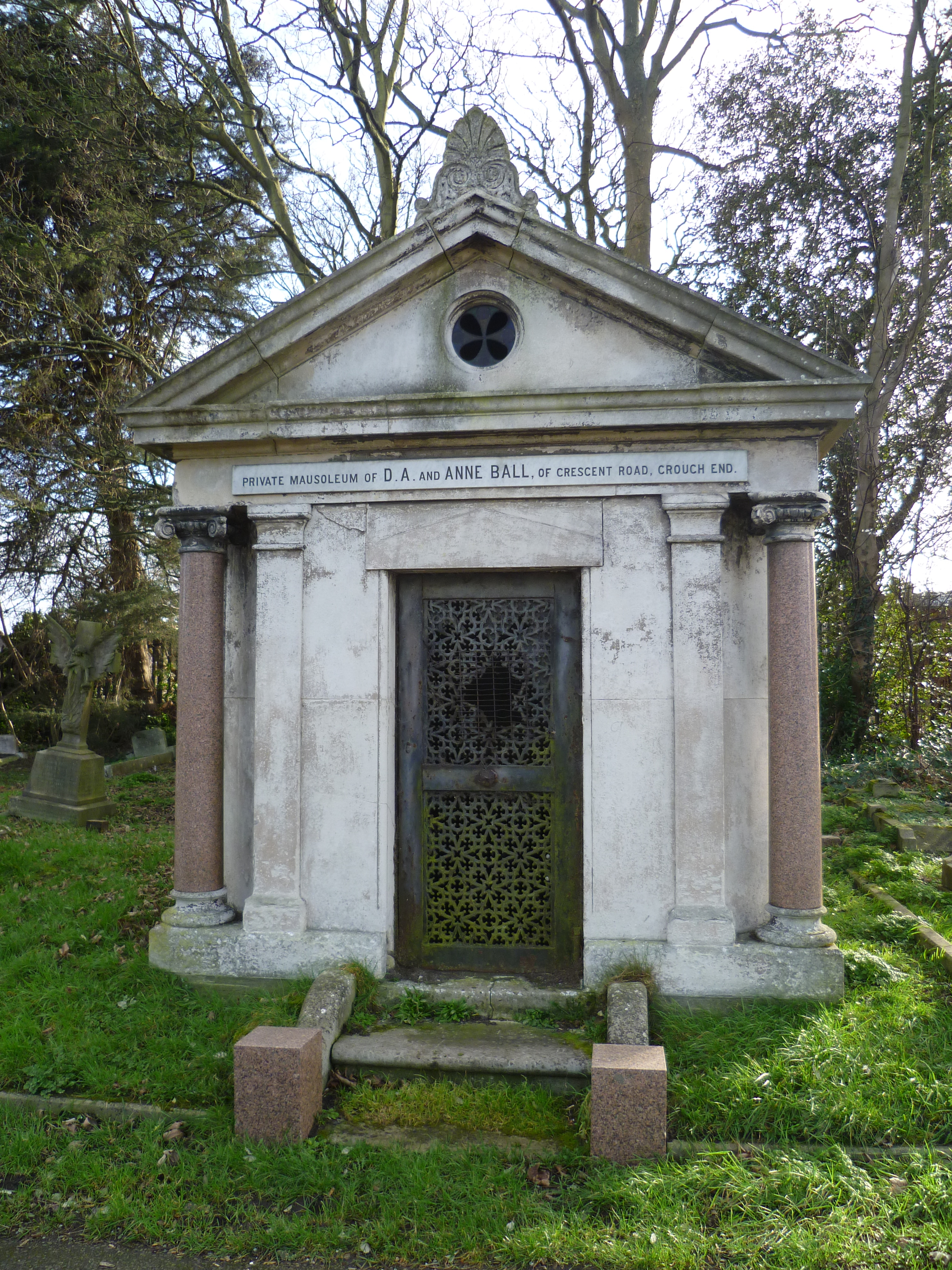
Mausoleum of Decimus Alfred Ball and his wife Anne at St Pancras and Islington Cemetery, London.

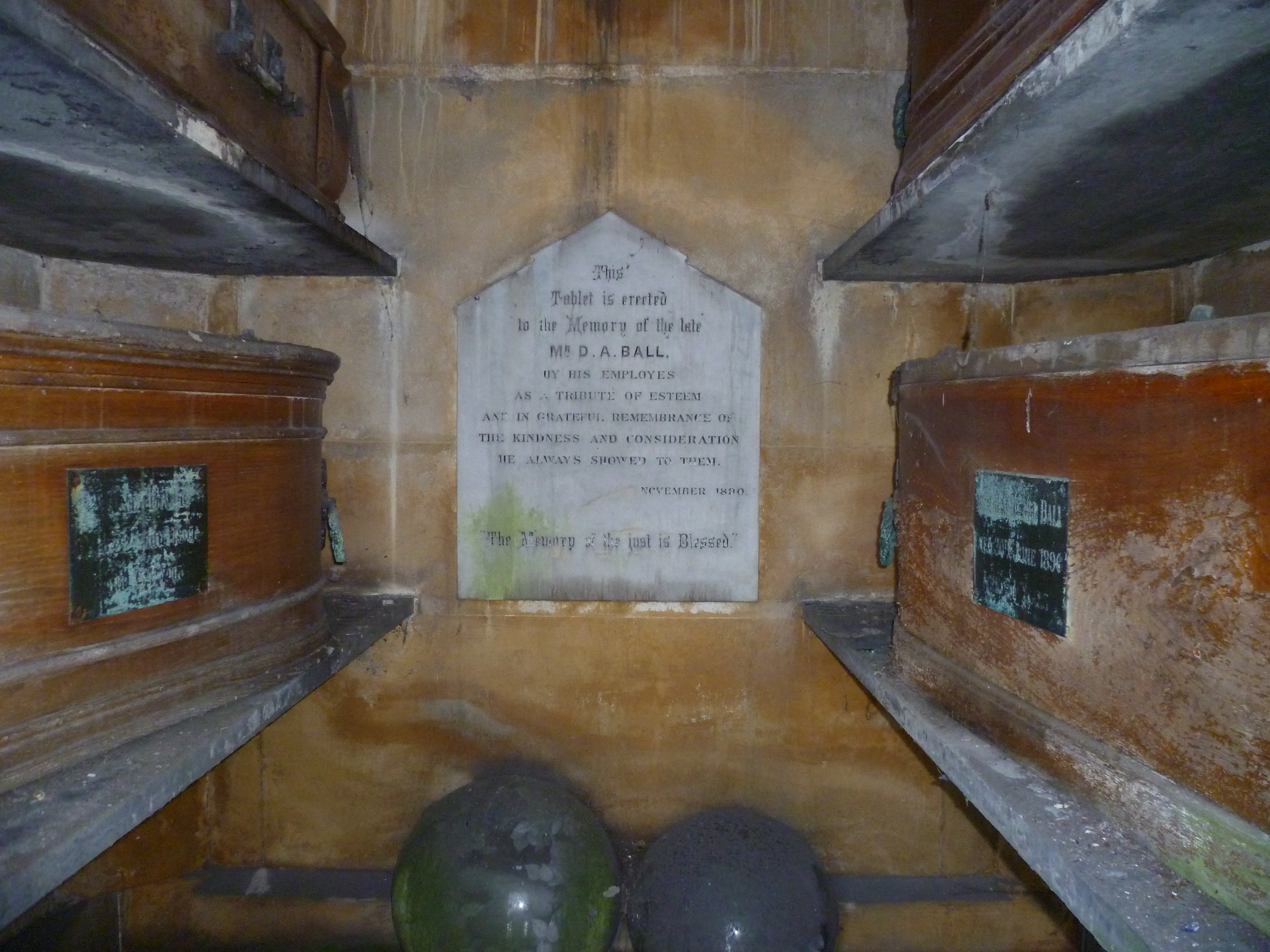
Interior of the Ball mausoleum at St Pancras and Islington Cemetery with memorial plaque from his employees.

Decimus Alfred Ball (1836 – 30 June 1890) was an upholsterer and furniture dealer in nineteenth century London who was also a "house farmer" on the Northampton Estate in Clerkenwell, London, known for the overcrowding and poor condition of his properties.

== Early life and family ==
Decimus Ball was born in Halstead, Essex, in 1836. In 1860, he married Ann (also Anne and Annie) King in the Clerkenwell district of London, daughter of John and Caroline Jackson. The 1881 census records that Decimus and Anne had four sons, Alfred, Leonard, Ernest and Herbert. At that time the family were living at 4 Crescent Road, Hornsey, north London. Ball was also at one time resident at 10 Crescent Road according to electoral records.

== Northampton Estate ==
The Northampton Estate (also known as Woods Close) was an area in Clerkenwell, east London, owned in the mid-nineteenth century by the Marquess of Northampton. The Northamptons had owned property in the area since the sixteenth century and continued to do so until the twentieth century. The area has since been redeveloped and is now largely occupied by City University London, and public housing.

The Northamptons had a practice of granting leases on their properties to "house farmers", also known as "house knackers" or "house jobbers", who then subdivided the houses and let them on again in order to maximise returns. In law, the house farmers were responsible to the Northamptons for the maintenance of the houses but in practice the requirement to maintain the properties was not often enforced leading to poor quality properties and a greater profit for the house farmer.

The practice of house farming quickly led to overcrowding and slum conditions, and was one of the matters investigated by the Royal Commission on the Housing of the Working Classes in 1884-85 where Ball was named as one of the main house farmers under the Marquess of Northampton as well as letting property elsewhere in London. He was also stated to be vice-chairman of the Clerkenwell parish assessment and appeal committee. Witnesses to the enquiry in 1884 could not agree whether Ball was a good landlord or not with some reporting that he would threaten to raise the rent if it was not paid by a tenant on the due date and others reporting fair treatment. There was agreement, however, that Ball made little effort to repair the properties.

== Death ==
Ball died at Glenthorne, Crescent Road, Crouch End, Middlesex, on 30 June 1890. In his will of 18 September 1889, Ball, who was described as a "furniture dealer," left his entire estate of £10,339 to his wife Anne. He is interred in a mausoleum at St Pancras and Islington Cemetery, London, along with his wife who died on 22 January 1905. The mausoleum contains two additional coffins and a memorial plaque from Ball's employees.
