= Public Health (Prevention and Treatment of Disease) Act 1913 =

Act of the Parliament of the United Kingdom

Public Health (Prevention and Treatment of Disease) Act 1913 (Note: Section 5.)
- Act of Parliament
- Parliament of the United Kingdom
- Long title: An Act to amend the Law relating to Public Health as respects the Prevention and Treatment of Disease.
- Citation: 3 & 4 Geo. 5. c. 23
- Territorial extent: United Kingdom

Dates
- Royal assent: 15 August 1913
- Commencement: 15 August 1913 (Note: The Acts of Parliament (Commencement) Act 1793.)
- Repealed: 1 October 1937
Other legislation
Amended by	Local Government Act 1933
Repealed by	Public Health Act 1936; Public Health (London) Act 1936
Relates to	Public Health Act 1875

Status: Repealed

Text of statute as originally enacted

The Public Health (Prevention and Treatment of Disease) Act 1913 (3 & 4 Geo. 5. c. 23) was an act of the Parliament of the United Kingdom relating to public health.

Among other things, the act authorised county boroughs and county councils to make arrangements for the treatment of tuberculosis.

== Subsequent developments ==
The whole act was repealed by section 346(1) of, and part V of the third schedule to, the Public Health Act 1936 (26 Geo. 5 & 1 Edw. 8. c. 49), and by section 308 of, and the seventh schedule to, the Public Health (London) Act 1936 (26 Geo. 5 & 1 Edw. 8. c. 50).
