= Public Health (Scotland) Act 1945 =

Act of the Parliament of the United Kingdom

Public Health (Scotland) Act 1945 (Note: Section 3.)
- Act of Parliament
- Parliament of the United Kingdom
- Long title: An Act to consolidate with amendments the provisions of Part IV of the Public Health (Scotland) Act, 1897, as amended by the Public Health Act, 1904, relating to epidemic, endemic or infectious diseases.
- Citation: 9 & 10 Geo. 6. c. 15
- Territorial extent: Scotland (Note: Section 1.)

Dates
- Royal assent: 20 December 1945
- Commencement: 20 December 1945 (Note: The Acts of Parliament (Commencement) Act 1793.)
- Repealed: 1 January 2010
Other legislation
Amends	See § Repealed enactments
Repeals/revokes	See § Repealed enactments
Amended by	Statute Law (Repeals) Act 1981
Repealed by	Public Health etc. (Scotland) Act 2008

Status: Repealed

Text of statute as originally enacted

Revised text of statute as amended

The Public Health (Scotland) Act 1945 (9 & 10 Geo. 6. c. 15) was an act of the Parliament of the United Kingdom that consolidated with amendments the provisions of the Public Health (Scotland) Act 1897 relating to epidemic, endemic or infectious diseases in Scotland.

== Provisions ==
=== Repealed enactments ===
Section 2 of the act repealed 2 enactments, listed in that section.

Citation	Short title	Extent of repeal
60 & 61 Vict. c. 38	Public Health (Scotland) Act 1897	Part IV.
4 Edw. 7. c. 16	Public Health Act 1904	So far as it relates to Scotland.

== Subsequent developments ==
Section 2 of the act was repealed by section 1(1) of, and part XII of schedule 1 to, the Statute Law (Repeals) Act 1981, which came into force on 21 May 1981.

The whole act was repealed by section 126 of, and part 1 of the third schedule to, the Public Health etc. (Scotland) Act 2008 (2008 asp 5), which came into force on 1 January 2010.
