= Public Health (Scotland) Act 1897 =

Act of the Parliament of the United Kingdom

Public Health (Scotland) Act 1897 (Note: Section 1.)
- Act of Parliament
- Parliament of the United Kingdom
- Long title: An Act to consolidate and amend the Laws relating to the Public Health in Scotland.
- Citation: 60 & 61 Vict. c. 38
- Territorial extent: Scotland (Note: Section 2.)

Dates
- Royal assent: 6 August 1897
- Commencement: 1 January 1898 (Note: Section 2.)
- Repealed: 1 October 2009
Other legislation
Amends	See § Repealed enactments
Repeals/revokes	See § Repealed enactments
Amended by	Public Health (Scotland) Amendment Act 1907; False Oaths (Scotland) Act 1933; Public Health (Coal Mine Refuse) (Scotland) Act 1939; Public Health (Scotland) Act 1945; Local Government (Scotland) Act 1947; National Assistance Act 1948; Rivers (Prevention of Pollution) (Scotland) Act 1951; Law Reform (Limitation of Actions, etc.) Act 1954; Food and Drugs (Scotland) Act 1956; Sewerage (Scotland) Act 1968; Slaughter of Animals (Scotland) Act 1980; Smoking, Health and Social Care (Scotland) Act 2005
Repealed by	Public Health etc. (Scotland) Act 2008

Status: Repealed

Text of statute as originally enacted

Revised text of statute as amended

The Public Health (Scotland) Act 1897 (60 & 61 Vict. c. 38) was an act of the Parliament of the United Kingdom that consolidated and amended the laws relating to public health in Scotland.

== Provisions ==
=== Repealed enactments ===
Section 196(1) of the act repealed 8 enactments, listed in the first schedule to the act.

Citation	Short title	Extent of repeal
30 & 31 Vict. c. 101	Public Health (Scotland) Act 1867	The whole act.
34 & 35 Vict. c. 38	Public Health (Scotland) Amendment Act 1871	The whole act.
38 & 39 Vict. c. 74	Public Health (Scotland) Act 1867 Amendment Act 1875	The whole act.
45 & 46 Vict. c. 11	Public Health (Scotland) Act 1867 Amendment Act 1882	The whole act.
52 & 53 Vict. c. 50	Local Government (Scotland) Act 1889	In sub-section three of section eighty-one, the words "and the assessments in respect of the drainage and water supply shall be levied in the same manner as they were before such district was formed into a police burgh."
53 & 54 Vict. c. 20	Public Health Amendment (Scotland) Act 1890	The whole act.
57 & 58 Vict. c. 58	Local Government (Scotland) Act 1894	In sub-section six of section forty-four, the words "as ascertained for the purposes of the Poor Law (Scotland) Act, 1845."
59 & 60 Vict. c. 19	Public Health Act 1896	The whole act (except the repeals therein contained) in so far as it relates to Scotland.

== Subsequent developments ==
The whole act was repealed by section 126(1) of, and part 1 of schedule 3 to, the Public Health etc. (Scotland) Act 2008, which came into force on 1 October 2009.
