= Leaney =

Leaney is a surname. Notable people with the surname include:

- Aaron Leaney, Canadian saxophonist and composer
- Edwin Leaney (1860–1904), English cricketer
- J. Leaney, South African cricket umpire
- John Leaney (christened 1790), English cricketer
- Kaitlan Leaney (born 2000), Australian rugby union player
- Stephen Leaney (born 1969), professional golfer from Australia
- William Leaney, English cricketer

== See also ==
- Laney (disambiguation)
- Leney
- Leny (disambiguation)
