= Leney =

Leney is a surname, and may refer to:

- William Satchwell Leney (1769—1831) English engraver
- Frederick Leney (1876—1921), English cricketer
- Herbert Leney (1850–1915), English cricketer
- Roger Leney (1923–2008), British military radio operator

== See also ==
- Leney, Saskatchewan in Canada
