= List of acts of the 2nd session of the 1st Parliament of the United Kingdom =

This is a complete list of acts of the 2nd session of the 1st Parliament of the United Kingdom which had regnal year 42 Geo. 3. This session met from 29 October 1801 until 28 June 1802.

Note that the first parliament of the United Kingdom was held in 1801; parliaments between 1707 and 1800 were either parliaments of Great Britain or of Ireland). For acts passed up until 1707, see the list of acts of the Parliament of England and the list of acts of the Parliament of Scotland. For acts passed from 1707 to 1800, see the list of acts of the Parliament of Great Britain. See also the list of acts of the Parliament of Ireland.

For acts of the devolved parliaments and assemblies in the United Kingdom, see the list of acts of the Scottish Parliament, the list of acts of the Northern Ireland Assembly, and the list of acts and measures of Senedd Cymru; see also the list of acts of the Parliament of Northern Ireland.

The number shown after each act's title is its chapter number. Acts passed before 1963 are cited using this number, preceded by the year(s) of the reign during which the relevant parliamentary session was held; thus the Union with Ireland Act 1800 is cited as "39 & 40 Geo. 3 c. 67", meaning the 67th act passed during the session that started in the 39th year of the reign of George III and which finished in the 40th year of that reign. Note that the modern convention is to use Arabic numerals in citations (thus "41 Geo. 3" rather than "41 Geo. III"). Acts of the last session of the Parliament of Great Britain and the first session of the Parliament of the United Kingdom are both cited as "41 Geo. 3". Acts passed from 1963 onwards are simply cited by calendar year and chapter number.

All modern acts have a short title, e.g. "the Local Government Act 2003". Some earlier acts also have a short title given to them by later acts, such as by the Short Titles Act 1896.

== 1801 ==
The second session of the 1st Parliament of the United Kingdom, which met from 29 October 1801 until 28 June 1802.

This session was also traditionally cited as 42 G. 3.

=== Public general acts ===
Short title	Citation	Royal assent
Long title
Duties on Malt, etc. Act 1801 (repealed)	42 Geo. 3. c. 1	21 November 1801
An Act for continuing and granting to His Majesty certain Duties upon Malt, Mum, Cyder and Perry, for the Service of the Year One thousand eight hundred and two. (Repealed by Statute Law Revision Act 1872 (35 & 36 Vict. c. 63))
Duties on Pensions, etc. Act 1801 (repealed)	42 Geo. 3. c. 2	21 November 1801
An Act for continuing and granting to His Majesty a Duty on Pensions, Offices and Personal Estates, in England, Wales and the Town of Berwick upon Tweed; and certain Duties on Sugar, Malt, Tobacco and Snuff, for the Service of the Year One thousand eight hundred and two. (Repealed by Statute Law Revision Act 1872 (35 & 36 Vict. c. 63))
Fish Act 1801 (repealed)	42 Geo. 3. c. 3	21 November 1801
An Act to revive and continue until the Twenty fifth Day of March One thousand eight hundred and three, so much of an Act made in the Forty first Year of the Reign of His present Majesty, (Note: (41 Geo. 3. c. ?)) as relates to permitting the Use of Salt, Duty free, in preserving of Fish; and to discontinuing the Bounty payable on White Herrings exported; and to indemnify all Persons who have issued or acted under any Orders for delivering Salt, Duty free, for the Purposes in the said Act mentioned. (Repealed by Sea Fisheries Act 1868 (31 & 32 Vict. c. 45))
Repeal of 41 Geo. 3 (Great Britain) c. 17, etc. Act 1801 (repealed)	42 Geo. 3. c. 4	21 November 1801
An Act to repeal an Act made in the Forty first Year of the Reign of His present Majesty, intituled "An Act to prohibit until the First Day of October One thousand eight hundred and one, and from thence to the End of Six Weeks next after the Commencement of the then next Session of Parliament, any Person or Persons from selling any Bread which shall not have been baked Twenty four Hours;" (Note: Sale of Bread (No. 3) Act 1800 (41 Geo. 3. (G.B.) c. 17)) and to indemnify Bakers and other Persons who have sold or exposed to Sale any Bread within the Time prohibited by the said Act. (Repealed by Statute Law Revision Act 1872 (35 & 36 Vict. c. 63))
Duty on Worts, etc. Act 1801 (repealed)	42 Geo. 3. c. 5	11 December 1801
An Act to continue until the First Day of January One thousand eight hundred and two, so much of an Act made in the Thirty ninth and Fortieth Years of the Reign of His present Majesty (Note: (39 & 40 Geo. 3. c. ?)) as relates to the reducing the Duties upon Worts or Wash brewed or made from Melasses or Sugar, or any Mixture therewith, or to any Distiller or Distillers, or Maker or Makers of Spirits; for reviving and continuing for the same Period so much of the said Act as relates to the reducing and better collecting the Duties payable on the Importation of Starch; and for continuing for the same Period an Act made in the same Session of Parliament for prohibiting the making of Low Wines or Spirits from Wheat, Barley, Malt or other Sort of Grain, or from any Meal, Flour or Bran in Scotland; and so much of an Act made in the last Session of Parliament (Note: (41 Geo. 3. c. ?)) as relates to allowing the Distillation of Spirits in Scotland from Melasses or Sugar at a lower Rate of Duty. (Repealed by Statute Law Revision Act 1872 (35 & 36 Vict. c. 63))
Lottery Act 1801 (repealed)	42 Geo. 3. c. 6	11 December 1801
An Act to rectify a Mistake in an Act made in the last Session of Parliament, intituled "An Act for granting to His Majesty a certain Sum of Money for the Service of Great Britain, to be raised by a Lottery," (Note: (41 Geo. 3. c. ?)) and to amend so much of the said Act as relates to the Commencement of the Drawing of the said Lottery. (Repealed by Statute Law Revision Act 1872 (35 & 36 Vict. c. 63))
Importation (No. 2) Act 1801 (repealed)	42 Geo. 3. c. 7	11 December 1801
An Act to repeal an Act made in the Thirty ninth Year of the Reign of His present Majesty, intituled "An Act to permit, until the First Day of August One thousand eight hundred and two, the Importation of certain Naval Stores from Hamburgh and other Ports of Germany." (Note: (39 Geo. 3. c. ?)) (Repealed by Statute Law Revision Act 1872 (35 & 36 Vict. c. 63))
National Debt Act 1801 (repealed)	42 Geo. 3. c. 8	11 December 1801
An Act for granting Annuities to satisfy certain Exchequer Bills. (Repealed by Statute Law Revision Act 1870 (33 & 34 Vict. c. 69))
Loans or Exchequer Bills Act 1801 (repealed)	42 Geo. 3. c. 9	11 December 1801
An Act for raising the Sum of Five Millions by Loans or Exchequer Bills, for the Service of the United Kingdom, for the Year One thousand eight hundred and two. (Repealed by Statute Law Revision Act 1872 (35 & 36 Vict. c. 63))
Prize Act 1801 (repealed)	42 Geo. 3. c. 10	11 December 1801
An Act to revive and continue until the First Day of January One thousand eight hundred and three, an Act made in the Thirty third Year of the Reign of His present Majesty, intituled "An Act for the Relief of the Captors of Prizes with respect to the bringing and landing certain Prize Goods in this Kingdom." (Note: (33 Geo. 3. c. ?)) (Repealed by Statute Law Revision Act 1872 (35 & 36 Vict. c. 63))
Correspondence with Foreign Parts Act 1801 (repealed)	42 Geo. 3. c. 11	11 December 1801
An Act to remove certain Restraints upon the Correspondence by Letter between Persons residing in Great Britain and Ireland, and Persons residing in certain Foreign Countries. (Repealed by Statute Law Revision Act 1872 (35 & 36 Vict. c. 63))
Militia Quotas Act 1801 (repealed)	42 Geo. 3. c. 12	11 December 1801
An Act to regulate until the Twenty fifth Day of March One thousand eight hundred and three, the Number of Private Militia Men in the several Counties, Ridings and Places, therein mentioned; and for supplying of Vacancies in the Militia. (Repealed by Militia Act 1802 (42 Geo. 3. c. 90)))
Corn, etc. Act 1801 (repealed)	42 Geo. 3. c. 13	11 December 1801
An Act to continue until the First Day of January One thousand eight hundred and three, and amend an Act of the Thirty ninth Year of the Reign of His present Majesty, (Note: (39 Geo. 3. c. ?)) for prohibiting the Exportation and permitting the Importation of Corn, and for allowing the Importation of other Articles of Provision without Payment of Duty; and to continue for the same Period, an Act of the last Session of Parliament (Note: (41 Geo. 3. c. ?)) for prohibiting the Exportation from Ireland of Corn or Potatoes, or other Provisions and for permitting the Importation into Ireland of Corn Fish and Provisions without Payment of Duty. (Repealed by Statute Law Revision Act 1872 (35 & 36 Vict. c. 63))
Manufacture of Starch Act 1801 (repealed)	42 Geo. 3. c. 14	15 December 1801
An Act to permit until the First Day of July One thousand eight hundred and two, the making of Starch from Rice or Potatoes, or any Mixture thereof, and the Importation of any such Starch from Ireland free of Duty. (Repealed by Statute Law Revision Act 1861 (24 & 25 Vict. c. 101))
Distillation from Wheat (Ireland) Act 1801 (repealed)	42 Geo. 3. c. 15	15 December 1801
An Act to prohibit the Distillation of Spirits from Wheat in Ireland. (Repealed by Statute Law Revision Act 1872 (35 & 36 Vict. c. 63))
Importation (No. 3) Act 1801 (repealed)	42 Geo. 3. c. 16	15 December 1801
An Act to continue until the Fifth Day of July One thousand eight hundred and two, an Act made in the Thirty fifth Year of the Reign of His present Majesty (Note: (35 Geo. 3. c. ?)) for preventing the Importation of organzined Thrown Silk, Flax and Flax Seed, into this Kingdom, in Ships or Vessels belonging to any Kingdom or State in Amity with His Majesty. (Repealed by Statute Law Revision Act 1872 (35 & 36 Vict. c. 63))

=== Local acts ===
Short title	Citation	Royal assent
Long title
South Molton Roads Act 1801 (repealed)	42 Geo. 3. c. i	11 December 1801
An Act for continuing the Term and enlarging the Powers of Two Acts, passed in the Thirty-second Year of the Reign of His late Majesty King George the Second, (Note: Southmolton Road Act 1758 (32 Geo. 2. c. 45)) and the Nineteenth Year of the Reign of His present Majesty, (Note: South Molton Roads Act 1779 (19 Geo. 3. c. 81)) for repairing, widening, and rendering safe and commodious, several Roads leading from the Town of South Molton, in the County of Devon. (Repealed by Southmolton Roads (Devon) Act 1839 (2 & 3 Vict. c. xlix))
Tenbury Roads Act 1801 (repealed)	42 Geo. 3. c. ii	11 December 1801
An Act for continuing the Term, and altering and enlarging the Powers of Two Acts, passed in the Thirtieth Year of the Reign of His late Majesty King George the Second, (Note: Tenbury Roads Act 1757 (30 Geo. 2. c. 38)) and the Twenty-second Year of the Reign of His present Majesty, (Note: Tenbury Roads Act 1782 (22 Geo. 3. c. 103)) for amending, widening, and keeping in Repair several Roads in and near to the Town of Tenbury, in the Counties of Salop, Worcester, and Hereford, and also the Roads leading from the Knowle Gate to the Turnpike Road on the Clee Hill, leading from Ludlow to Cleobury Mortimer, and from Kyre to Tenbury, in the said Counties. (Repealed by Tenbury and Hereford Roads Act 1823 (4 Geo. 4. c. xxv))
Seend and Box Road (Wiltshire) Act 1801 (repealed)	42 Geo. 3. c. iii	15 December 1801
An Act for continuing the Term and Powers of an Act made in the Twentieth Year of the Reign of His present Majesty, intituled, "An Act for amending the Road from the West End of Seend Street to the Horse and Jockey, in the Parish of Box in the County of Wilts, and certain other Roads leading out of the said Road; and for making an additional Road from the said Road in the Chapelry of Seend, to communicate with the Devizes Turnpike Road, at or near Somerham Brook, in the same Chapelry, all in the said County." (Note: Wiltshire Roads (No. 2) Act 1780 (20 Geo. 3. c. 98)) (Repealed by Somerham Brook and Box (Wiltshire) Road Act 1823 (4 Geo. 4. c. xxix))

=== Private acts ===
Short title	Citation	Royal assent
Long title
Tuddenham Inclosure Act 1801	42 Geo. 3. c. 1 Pr.	11 December 1801
An Act for dividing, allotting, and inclosing the Open Fields, Commons, and Waste Grounds, within the Parish of East Tuddenham, in the County of Norfolk.
Medlycott's Name Act 1801	42 Geo. 3. c. 2 Pr.	11 December 1801
An Act for enabling the Honourable Barbara Cockayne Medlycott to take and use the Surname and Arms of Medlycott, pursuant to the Will of her Grandfather, Thomas Medlycott Esquire, deceased.
Bluhm's Naturalization Act 1801	42 Geo. 3. c. 3 Pr.	11 December 1801
An Act for naturalizing John Henry Bluhm.
De Brouquens's Naturalization Act 1801	42 Geo. 3. c. 4 Pr.	11 December 1801
An Act for naturalizing John Bertrand de Boubeé de Brouquens.
Fridag's Naturalization Act 1801	42 Geo. 3. c. 5 Pr.	11 December 1801
An Act for naturalizing Sebastian Fridag.
Hilbers' Naturalization Act 1801	42 Geo. 3. c. 6 Pr.	11 December 1801
An Act for naturalizing Herman Gerhard Hilbers.
Lelievre's Naturalization Act 1801	42 Geo. 3. c. 7 Pr.	11 December 1801
An Act for naturalizing Pierre Joseph Amand Lelievre.
Aldebert and Becher's Naturalization Act 1801	42 Geo. 3. c. 8 Pr.	11 December 1801
An Act for naturalizing Isaac Aldebert and Charles Christian Becher.
Schroder's Naturalization Act 1801	42 Geo. 3. c. 9 Pr.	11 December 1801
An Act for naturalizing John Frederick Schroder.

== 1802 ==
Continuing the second session of the 1st Parliament of the United Kingdom, which met from 29 October 1801 until 28 June 1802.

This session was also traditionally cited as 42 G. 3.

=== Public general acts ===
Short title	Citation	Royal assent
Long title
Loans or Exchequer Bills Act 1802 (repealed)	42 Geo. 3. c. 17	24 February 1802
An act for raising a further Sum of Money by Loans or Exchequer Bills, for the Service of Great Britain for the Year One thousand eight hundred and two. (Repealed by Statute Law Revision Act 1872 (35 & 36 Vict. c. 63))
Southern Whale Fishery Act 1802 (repealed)	42 Geo. 3. c. 18	24 February 1802
An act for continuing the Premiums allowed to Ships employed in, and for enlarging the Limits of the Southern Whale Fishery. (Repealed by Customs Law Repeal Act 1825 (6 Geo. 4. c. 105))
Westminster Fish Market Act 1802 (repealed)	42 Geo. 3. c. 19	24 February 1802
An act to amend so much of an Act, made in the twenty-ninth Year of the Reign of his late Majesty King George the Second, intituled, An act for explaining, amending, and rendering more effectual an Act made in the twenty second Year of his present Majesty's Reign, intituled, An act for making a free Market for the Sale of Fish in the City of Westminster, and for preventing the forestalling and monopolizing of Fish; and for allowing the Sale of Fish under the Dimensions mentioned in a Clause contained in an Act of the first Year of his late Majesty's Reign, in case the same are taken with a Hook, as relates to the Sale of Eels. (Repealed by Sea Fisheries Act 1868 (31 & 32 Vict. c. 45))
Duties on Rum, etc. Act 1802 (repealed)	42 Geo. 3. c. 20	19 March 1802
An act for making perpetual so much of an Act, made in the nineteenth Year of the Reign of his present Majesty, as relates to the allowing a Drawback of the Duties on Rum shipped as Stores to be consumed on board Merchant Ships on their Voyages; and to continue several Laws relating to the permitting the Exportation of Tobacco Pipe Clay from Great Britain to the British Sugar Colonies in the West Indies until the twenty-fourth Day of June One thousand eight hundred and eight; to the giving further Encouragement to the Importation of Naval Stores from the British Colonies in America until the twenty-ninth Day of September One thousand eight hundred and twelve; to the regulating the Payment of the Duties on Cinnamon, Cloves, Nutmegs, and Mace; to the allowing the Importation of certain Fish from Newfoundland and the Coast of Labrador until the twenty fourth Day of June One thousand eight hundred and eight; and to the allowing the Importation and Exportation of Goods from and to India and China, in Ships not of British built, during the Continuance of the exclusive Trade to and from the East Indies, granted to the East India Company by an Act of the thirty-third Year of his present Majesty's Reign. (Repealed by Statute Law Revision Act 1861 (24 & 25 Vict. c. 101))
Loans or Exchequer Bills (No. 2) Act 1802 (repealed)	42 Geo. 3. c. 21	19 March 1802
An act for raising the Sum of one Million by Loans or Exchequer Bills, for the Service of Great Britain for the Year One thousand eight hundred and two. (Repealed by Statute Law Revision Act 1872 (35 & 36 Vict. c. 63))
Greenland Whale Fisheries Act 1802 (repealed)	42 Geo. 3. c. 22	19 March 1802
An act for continuing, until the twenty-fifth Day of December One thousand eight hundred and four, the Bounties granted for the Encouragement of the Greenland Whale Fisheries; and for continuing and amending the Regulations respecting the same. (Repealed by Customs Law Repeal Act 1825 (6 Geo. 4. c. 105))
Indemnity Act 1802 (repealed)	42 Geo. 3. c. 23	19 March 1802
An Act to indemnify such Persons as have omitted to qualify themselves for Offices and Employments; and to indemnify Justices of the Peace, or others, who have omitted to register or deliver in their Qualifications within the Time directed by Law, and for extending the Time limited for those Purposes, until the twenty-fifth Day of December One thousand eight hundred and two; to indemnify Members and Officers, in Cities, Corporations, and Borough Towns, whose Admissions have been omitted to be stamped according to Law, or having been stamped have been lost or mislaid, and for allowing them until the twenty-fifth Day of December One thousand eight hundred and two, to provide Admissions duly stamped; to permit such Persons as have omitted to make and file Affidavits of the Execution of Indentures of Clerks to Attornies and Solicitors, to make and file the same on or before the first Day of Michaelmas Term One thousand eight hundred and two; to allow until the twenty-fourth Day of December One thousand eight hundred and two, Persons who have omitted to pay the Duties on the Indentures and Contracts of Clerks, Apprentices, or Servants, to make Payment of the same; to indemnify such Persons as have neglected to obtain Certificates of Admission as Solicitors or Attornies, Notaries or Proctors, and for extending the Time, limited for that Purpose, until two Months after the passing of this Act; to indemnify Persons who have printed or published Pleadings, and other Proceedings in Courts of Law or Equity, upon which the Name and Place of Abode of the Printer has not been printed; and for indemnifying Deputy Lieutenants and Officers of the Militia, who have neglected to transmit Descriptions of their Qualifications to the Clerks of the Peace, within the Time directed by Law, and for extending the Time, limited for that Purpose, until the first Day of September One thousand eight hundred and two. (Repealed by Promissory Oaths Act 1871 (34 & 35 Vict. c. 48))
Duties on Cinnamon, etc. Act 1802 (repealed)	42 Geo. 3. c. 24	19 March 1802
An act to repeal the Duties on Cinnamon imported by the East India Company, and on Cassia Lignea of all Sorts, and for granting new Duties in lieu thereof; and to repeal the Custom Duties on certain Hides and Skins; and to repeal certain Duties granted by an Act of the last Session of Parliament upon Box Wood imported, and granting new Duties in lieu thereof. (Repealed by Statute Law Revision Act 1861 (24 & 25 Vict. c. 101))
Mutiny Act 1802 (repealed)	42 Geo. 3. c. 25	24 March 1802
An act for punishing Mutiny and Desertion; and for the better Payment of the Army and their Quarters, within the United Kingdom, and the Islands of Jersey, Guernsey, Alderney, Sark, and Man. (Repealed by Statute Law Revision Act 1872 (35 & 36 Vict. c. 63))
Marine Mutiny Act 1802 (repealed)	42 Geo. 3. c. 26	24 March 1802
An act for the Regulation of his Majesty's Marine Forces while on Shore, until the twenty-fifth Day of May One thousand eight hundred and two. (Repealed by Statute Law Revision Act 1872 (35 & 36 Vict. c. 63))
Countervailing Duties Act 1802 (repealed)	42 Geo. 3. c. 27	24 March 1802
An act to empower his Majesty to cause certain countervailing Duties, granted by an Act of the thirty Seventh Year of the Reign of his present Majesty, intituled, An act for carrying into Execution the Treaty of Amity, Commerce, and Navigation, concluded between his Majesty and the United States of America, to cease, or be suspended until the twenty-fifth Day of March One thousand eight hundred and three, under certain Circumstances. (Repealed by Statute Law Revision Act 1872 (35 & 36 Vict. c. 63))
Transportation Act 1802 (repealed)	42 Geo. 3. c. 28	24 March 1802
An act for continuing, until the twenty-fifth Day of March One thousand eight hundred and five, and from thence to the End of the then next Session of Parliament, and amending several Laws relating to the Transportation of Felons and other Offenders, to temporary Places of Confinement in England and Scotland respectively. (Repealed by Statute Law Revision Act 1872 (35 & 36 Vict. c. 63))
Fort Marlborough in India Act 1802 (repealed)	42 Geo. 3. c. 29	24 March 1802
An act to authorize the East India Company to make their Settlement at Fort Marlborough, in the East Indies, a Factory subordinate to the Presidency of Fort William in Bengal, and to transfer the Servants who, on the Reduction of that Establishment, shall be supernumary, to the Presidency of Fort Saint George. (Repealed by Statute Law Revision Act 1872 (35 & 36 Vict. c. 63))
Proceedings Against Spiritual Persons Act 1802 (repealed)	42 Geo. 3. c. 30	24 March 1802
An act to continue, until the twenty-fifth Day of July One thousand eight hundred and two, an Act, made in the last Session of Parliament, intituled, "An act to stay, until the twenty-fifth Day of March One thousand eight hundred and two, Proceedings in Actions under the Statute of King Henry the Eighth, for abridging Spiritual Persons from having Pluralities of Livings, and from taking of Farms." (Note: Pluralties of Livings Act 1801 (41 Geo. 3. (U.K.) c. 102)) (Repealed by Statute Law Revision Act 1872 (35 & 36 Vict. c. 63))
Duties Continuance Act 1802 (repealed)	42 Geo. 3. c. 31	24 March 1802
An act for continuing, until the twenty-fifth Day of March One thousand eight hundred and three, several Acts of the last Session of Parliament, for continuing and granting Duties to his Majesty in Ireland. (Repealed by Statute Law Revision Act 1872 (35 & 36 Vict. c. 63))
Lairy Embankment (Plymouth) Act 1802	42 Geo. 3. c. 32	24 March 1802
An act to enable his Majesty to grant certain Parcels of Land, situate between Great Prince Rock and the Village of Crab Tree, called Tothill Bay, and Lipson Bay, near to the Borough of Plymouth in the County of Devon, to certain Persons therein named, for the Purpose of embanking and preferring the same from the Sea.
National Debt Act 1802 (repealed)	42 Geo. 3. c. 33	15 April 1802
An act for raising the Sum of twenty-five Millions by way of Annuities. (Repealed by Statute Law Revision Act 1870 (33 & 34 Vict. c. 69))
Duties on Windows, etc. Act 1802 (repealed)	42 Geo. 3. c. 34	15 April 1802
An act for granting to his Majesty certain additional Duties on Windows or Lights, and on inhabited Houses; and for consolidating the same with the present Duties thereon. (Repealed by Statute Law Revision Act 1861 (24 & 25 Vict. c. 101))
Trade in Grain, etc. Act 1802 (repealed)	42 Geo. 3. c. 35	15 April 1802
An act for regulating, until the fifteenth Day of February One thousand eight hundred and three, the Prices at which Grain, Meal, and Flour, may be exported from Great Britain to Ireland, and from Ireland to Great Britain. (Repealed by Statute Law Revision Act 1872 (35 & 36 Vict. c. 63))
Collection of Revenues (Ireland) Act 1802 (repealed)	42 Geo. 3. c. 36	15 April 1802
An act to continue, until the twenty-ninth Day of September One thousand eight hundred and three, several Acts of the last Session of Parliament for reviving, continuing, and amending several Laws for the better Collection and Security of the Revenues of Ireland. (Repealed by Statute Law Revision Act 1872 (35 & 36 Vict. c. 63))
Duties on Servants, etc. Act 1802 (repealed)	42 Geo. 3. c. 37	30 April 1802
An act for granting to his Majesty certain additional Duties on Servants, Carriages, Horses, Mules, and Dogs; and for consolidating the same with the present Duties thereon. (Repealed by Statute Law Revision Act 1861 (24 & 25 Vict. c. 101))
Duties on Beer, etc. Act 1802 (repealed)	42 Geo. 3. c. 38	30 April 1802
An act for granting to his Majesty additional Duties on Beer and Ale brewed in or imported into Great Britain; on Malt made in Great Britain; on Hops grown in or imported into Great Britain; and on Spirits distilled in Ireland and imported into Great Britain; for repealing certain Allowances to Brewers of Beer and Ale; and for preventing Frauds and Abuses in the Revenue of Excise, on Beer, Ale, and Malt. (Repealed by Statute Law Revision Act 1861 (24 & 25 Vict. c. 101))
Repayment of Certain Loans Act 1802 (repealed)	42 Geo. 3. c. 39	30 April 1802
An act for extending the Time for the Payment of certain Sums of Money, advanced by way of Loan to several Persons connected with and trading to the Islands of Grenada and Saint Vincent. (Repealed by Statute Law Revision Act 1872 (35 & 36 Vict. c. 63))
Restriction on Cash Payments Act 1802 (repealed)	42 Geo. 3. c. 40	30 April 1802
An act to continue, until the first Day of March One thousand eight hundred and three, the Restrictions contained in several Acts of the thirty-seventh and thirty-eighth Years of the Reign of his present Majesty, on Payment in Cash by the Bank. (Repealed by Statute Law Revision Act 1872 (35 & 36 Vict. c. 63))
Exchequer Bills Act 1802 (repealed)	42 Geo. 3. c. 41	4 May 1802
An act to enable the Lords Commissioners of his Majesty's Treasury of Great Britain to issue Exchequer Bills, on the Credit of such Aids or Supplies as have been or shall be granted by Parliament, for the Service of Great Britain for the Year One thousand eight hundred and two. (Repealed by Statute Law Revision Act 1872 (35 & 36 Vict. c. 63))
Income Tax Repeal, etc. Act 1802 (repealed)	42 Geo. 3. c. 42	4 May 1802
An act for repealing the Duties on Income; for the effectual Collection of Arrears of the said Duties, and accounting for the same; and for charging the Annuities specifically charged thereon, upon the Consolidated Fund of Great Britain. (Repealed by Statute Law Revision Act 1872 (35 & 36 Vict. c. 63))
Duties of Customs and Tonnage Act 1802 (repealed)	42 Geo. 3. c. 43	7 May 1802
An act for granting to his Majesty certain Duties on Goods imported into and exported from Great Britain, and on the Tonnage of Ships and Vessels entering outwards or Inwards in any Port of Great Britain to or from Foreign Parts. (Repealed by Statute Law Revision Act 1861 (24 & 25 Vict. c. 101))
Importation Act 1802 (repealed)	42 Geo. 3. c. 44	7 May 1802
An act for permitting French Wines to be imported into Great Britain in Bottles or Flasks, under certain Restrictions. (Repealed by Customs Law Repeal Act 1825 (6 Geo. 4. c. 105))
Restriction on Cash Payments (No. 2) Act 1802 (repealed)	42 Geo. 3. c. 45	7 May 1802
An act to continue, until three Months after any Restriction imposed by any Act of the present Session of Parliament on the Bank of England from issuing Cash in Payment shall cease, an Act made in the Parliament of Ireland in the thirty-seventh Year of the Reign of his present Majesty, for confirming and continuing the Restrictions on Payments in Cash by the Bank of Ireland. (Repealed by Statute Law Revision Act 1872 (35 & 36 Vict. c. 63))
Parish Apprentices Act 1802	42 Geo. 3. c. 46	7 May 1802
An act to require Overseers and Guardians of the Poor, to keep a Register of the several Children who shall be bound or assigned by them as Apprentices; and to extend the Provisions of an Act, passed in the twentieth Year of the Reign of his present Majesty, to the binding of Apprentices by Houses of Industry, or Establishments for the Poor, which have been authorized so to do by subsequent Acts.
Duties on Sugar, etc. Act 1802 (repealed)	42 Geo. 3. c. 47	10 May 1802
An act to continue, until the twentieth Day of May One thousand eight hundred and three, and amend an Act made in the last Session of Parliament relating to certain Duties on Sugar and Coffee exported; for permitting British Plantation Sugar to be warehoused, and for regulating and allowing Drawbacks on Sugar exported. (Repealed by Statute Law Revision Act 1861 (24 & 25 Vict. c. 101))
Annuities to Duke of Sussex etc. Act 1802 (repealed)	42 Geo. 3. c. 48	24 May 1802
An act for enabling his Majesty to settle an Annuity of twelve thousand Pounds on his Royal Highness the Duke of Sussex, and a like Annuity of twelve thousand Pounds on his Royal Highness the Duke of Cambridge, during his Majesty's Pleasure. (Repealed by Statute Law Revision Act 1872 (35 & 36 Vict. c. 63))
Militia Pay (England) Act 1802 (repealed)	42 Geo. 3. c. 49	24 May 1802
An act for defraying the Charge of the Pay of the Militia in England, for the Year One thousand eight hundred and two. (Repealed by Statute Law Revision Act 1872 (35 & 36 Vict. c. 63))
Mutiny (No. 2) Act 1802 (repealed)	42 Geo. 3. c. 50	24 May 1802
An act for continuing an Act, made in this Session of Parliament, intituled, An act for punishing Mutiny and Desertion; and for the better Payment of the Army and their quarters, within the United Kingdom, and the Islands of Jersey, Guernsey, Alderney, Sark, and Man. (Repealed by Statute Law Revision Act 1872 (35 & 36 Vict. c. 63))
Marine Mutiny (No. 2) Act 1802 (repealed)	42 Geo. 3. c. 51	24 May 1802
An act for continuing, until the twenty-fifth Day of June One thousand eight hundred and two, an Act made in this Session of Parliament, for the Regulation of his Majesty's Marine Forces while on Shore. (Repealed by Statute Law Revision Act 1872 (35 & 36 Vict. c. 63))
Post Horse Duties Act 1802 (repealed)	42 Geo. 3. c. 52	24 May 1802
An act for further continuing, until the first Day of February One thousand eight hundred and six, an Act, made in the twenty-seventh Year of the Reign of his present Majesty, intituled. An act to enable the Lord High Treasurer, or Commissioners of the Treasury, for the Time being, to let to Farm the Duties granted by an Act, made in the twenty-fifth Year of his present Majesty's Reign, on Horses let to Hire for travelling Post and by Time, to such Persons as should be willing to contract for the same (Repealed by Statute Law Revision Act 1872 (35 & 36 Vict. c. 63))
Indemnity (Ireland) Act 1802 (repealed)	42 Geo. 3. c. 53	24 May 1802
An act to indemnify Persons who have omitted to qualify themselves for Offices or Employments in Ireland according to Law. (Repealed by Statute Law Revision Act 1872 (35 & 36 Vict. c. 63))
Lotteries Act 1802 (repealed)	42 Geo. 3. c. 54	28 May 1802
An act for granting to his Majesty a certain Sum of Money, to be raised by Lotteries. (Repealed by Statute Law Revision Act 1872 (35 & 36 Vict. c. 63))
Militia Allowances Act 1802 (repealed)	42 Geo. 3. c. 55	28 May 1802
An act for making Allowances in certain Cases to Subaltern Officers of the Militia, during Peace. (Repealed by Statute Law Revision Act 1872 (35 & 36 Vict. c. 63))
Medicines Stamp Act 1802	42 Geo. 3. c. 56	3 June 1802
An act to repeal an Act, passed in the twenty fifth Year of the Reign of his present Majesty, for granting Stamp Duties on certain Medicines, and for charging other Duties in lieu thereof; and for making effectual Provision for the better Collection of the said Duties.
National Debt Commissioners Act 1802 (repealed)	42 Geo. 3. c. 57	3 June 1802
An act to amend so much of an Act, made in the Parliament of Ireland in the thirty-seventh Year of the Reign of his present Majesty, intituled, An act for vesting a certain Fund in Commissioners at the End of every Quarter of a Year, to be by them applied to the Reduction of the National Debt; and to direct the Application of additional Funds, in case of future Loans to the like Purpose, as relates to the Commissioners for carrying the same into Execution. (Repealed by Statute Law Revision Act 1872 (35 & 36 Vict. c. 63))
National Debt (No. 2) Act 1802 (repealed)	42 Geo. 3. c. 58	3 June 1802
An act for raising a certain Sum of Money by Way of Annuities on Debentures, for the Service of Ireland. (Repealed by Statute Law Revision Act 1870 (33 & 34 Vict. c. 69))
Bounties Act 1802 (repealed)	42 Geo. 3. c. 59	3 June 1802
An act for allowing, until the twentieth Day of May One thousand eight hundred and three, additional Bounties on refined Sugar exported, and discontinuing the Duty thereon granted by an Act of this Session of Parliament. (Repealed by Statute Law Revision Act 1872 (35 & 36 Vict. c. 63))
Drawbacks Act 1802 (repealed)	42 Geo. 3. c. 60	3 June 1802
An act to continue, until the thirtieth Day of May One thousand eight hundred and three, and amend an Act, made in the last Session of Parliament, for regulating and allowing Drawbacks on Sugar exported from Ireland; and for allowing British Plantation Sugar to be warehoused in Ireland; and for granting an additional Drawback on the Exportation of refined Sugar. (Repealed by Statute Law Revision Act 1872 (35 & 36 Vict. c. 63))
Irish Mariners, etc. Act 1802 (repealed)	42 Geo. 3. c. 61	3 June 1802
An act for the further Encouragement of Irish Mariners, and for other Purposes relating thereto. (Repealed by Statute Law Revision Act 1861 (24 & 25 Vict. c. 101))
Oaths at Parliamentary Elections Act 1802 (repealed)	42 Geo. 3. c. 62	3 June 1802
An act for extending the Provisions of an Act, made in the thirty-fourth Year of the Reign of his present Majesty, intituled, An act for directing the Appointment of Commissioners to administer certain Oaths and Declarations, required by Law to be taken and made by Persons offering to vote at the Election of Members to serve in Parliament, to all Oaths now required by Law to be taken by Voters at Elections for Members to serve in Parliament. (Repealed by Statute Law Revision Act 1872 (35 & 36 Vict. c. 63))
Postage Act 1802 (repealed)	42 Geo. 3. c. 63	22 June 1802
An act to authorize the sending and receiving of Letters and Packets, Votes, Proceedings in Parliament, and printed Newspapers by the Post, free from the Duty of Portage, by the Members of the two Houses of Parliament of the United Kingdom, and by certain publick Officers therein named; and for reducing the Postage on such Votes, Proceedings, and Newspapers when sent by any other Persons. (Repealed by Post Office (Repeal of Laws) Act 1837 (7 Will. 4 & 1 Vict. c. 32))
Militia Allowances (No. 2) Act 1802 (repealed)	42 Geo. 3. c. 64	22 June 1802
An act to revive, and further continue until the twenty-fifth Day of March One thousand eight hundred and three, and amend so much of an Act, made in the thirty-ninth and fortieth Years of the Reign of his present Majesty, as grants certain Allowances to Adjutants and Serjeant-Majors of Militia, disembodied under an Act of the same session of Parliament. (Repealed by Statute Law Revision Act 1872 (35 & 36 Vict. c. 63))
Militia Allowances (No. 3) Act 1802 (repealed)	42 Geo. 3. c. 65	22 June 1802
An act for making Allowances, until the twenty-fifth Day of March One thousand eight hundred and three, in certain Cases, to Subaltern Officers of the Militia of Ireland, during Peace. (Repealed by Statute Law Revision Act 1872 (35 & 36 Vict. c. 63))
Yeomanry and Volunteers Act 1802 (repealed)	42 Geo. 3. c. 66	22 June 1802
An act to enable his Majesty to avail himself of the Offers of certain Yeomanry and Volunteer Corps to continue their Services. (Repealed by Statute Law Revision Act 1861 (24 & 25 Vict. c. 101))
Theft of Turnips, etc. Act 1802 (repealed)	42 Geo. 3. c. 67	22 June 1802
An act to extend the Provisions of an Act, made in the thirteenth Year of the Reign of his present Majesty, intituled, An act for repealing so much of an Act, made in the twenty-third Year of his late Majesty King George the Second, as relates to the preventing the stealing or destroying of Turnips, and for the more effectually preventing the stealing or destroying of Turnips, Potatoes, Cabbages, Parsnips, Pease, and Carrots, to certain other Field Crops, and to Orchards; and for amending the said Act. (Repealed by Statute Law Revision Act 1887 (50 & 51 Vict. c. 59))
Yeomanry (Ireland) Act 1802 (repealed)	42 Geo. 3. c. 68	22 June 1802
An act to enable his Majesty to accept and continue the Services of certain Troops or Companies of Yeomanry in Ireland. (Repealed by Territorial Army and Militia Act 1921 (11 & 12 Geo. 5. c. 37))
Exercise of Trade by Soldiers, etc. Act 1802 (repealed)	42 Geo. 3. c. 69	22 June 1802
An act to enable such Officers, Mariners, and Soldiers as have been in the Land or Sea Service, or in the Marines, or in the Militia, or any Corps of Fencible Men, since the twenty-fourth Year of his present Majesty's Reign, to exercise Trades. (Repealed by Statute Law Revision Act 1872 (35 & 36 Vict. c. 63))
Public Accounts Act 1802 (repealed)	42 Geo. 3. c. 70	22 June 1802
An act for directing certain publick Accounts to be laid annually before Parliament, and for discontinuing certain other Forms of Account now in Use. (Repealed by Statute Law Revision Act 1861 (24 & 25 Vict. c. 101))
National Debt (No. 3) Act 1802 (repealed)	42 Geo. 3. c. 71	22 June 1802
An act to amend and render more effectual two Acts passed in twenty-sixth and thirty-second Years of the Reign of his present Majesty, for the Reduction of the National Debt. (Repealed by Statute Law Revision Act 1861 (24 & 25 Vict. c. 101))
Militia (Stannaries) Act 1802 (repealed)	42 Geo. 3. c. 72	22 June 1802
An Act for repealing an Act, made in the Thirty-eighth Year of the Reign of His Present Majesty, intituled An Act for raising a Body of Miners in the Counties of Cornwall and Devon, for the Defence of the Kingdom during the present War; and the for more effectually raising and regulating a Body of Miners for the Defence of Great Britain. (Repealed by Territorial Army and Militia Act 1921 (11 & 12 Geo. 5. c. 37))
Health and Morals of Apprentices Act 1802 or the Factories Act 1802 or the Factory Act 1802 (repealed)	42 Geo. 3. c. 73	22 June 1802
Act for the preservation of the Health and Morals of Apprentices and others employed in Cotton and other Mills, and Cotton and other Factories. (Repealed by Factory and Workshop Act 1878 (41 & 42 Vict. c. 16)))
Loans for Erection of Workhouses Act 1802 (repealed)	42 Geo. 3. c. 74	22 June 1802
An act to amend an Act, made in the twenty-second Year of the Reign of his present Majesty, for the better Relief and Employment of the Poor, so far as relates to the Payment of the Debts incurred for building any Poor House. (Repealed by Statute Law Revision Act 1872 (35 & 36 Vict. c. 63))
Linen Manufacture (Ireland) Act 1802 (repealed)	42 Geo. 3. c. 75	22 June 1802
An act to amend the Laws for the better Regulation of the Linen Manufacture in Ireland. (Repealed by Statute Law Revision Act 1872 (35 & 36 Vict. c. 63))
Metropolitan Police Magistrates Act 1802 (repealed)	42 Geo. 3. c. 76	22 June 1802
An act for repealing two Acts, made in the thirty-second and thirty-sixth Years of the Reign of his present Majesty, for the more effectual Administration of the Office of a Justice of the Peace, in such Parts of the Counties of Middlesex and Surrey, as lie in and near the Metropolis, and for the more effectual Prevention of Felonies; and for making other Provisions in lieu thereof; and for increasing the Salaries of the Justices at the Thames Police Office, until the first Day of June One thousand eight hundred and seven, and from thence to the End of the then next Session of Parliament. (Repealed by Statute Law Revision Act 1872 (35 & 36 Vict. c. 63))
Pacific Ocean Fisheries Act 1802 (repealed)	42 Geo. 3. c. 77	22 June 1802
An act to permit British-built Ships to carry on the Fisheries in the Pacific Ocean, without Licence from the East India Company, or the South Sea Company. (Repealed by Statute Law Revision Act 1861 (24 & 25 Vict. c. 101))
Hackney Coaches, Metropolis Act 1802 (repealed)	42 Geo. 3. c. 78	22 June 1802
An act to authorize the licensing an additional Number of Hackney Coaches. (Repealed by London Hackney Carriage Act 1831 (1 & 2 Will. 4. c. 22))
British Fisheries, etc. Act 1802 (repealed)	42 Geo. 3. c. 79	22 June 1802
An act to revive, and continue until the fifth Day of April One thousand eight hundred and four, and to amend several Acts, passed in the twenty-seventh, thirty-fifth, and thirty-ninth Years of his present Majesty's Reign, for the more effectual Encouragement of the British Fisheries; and to continue, until the fourteenth Day of June One thousand eight hundred and three, and from thence to the End of the then next Session of Parliament, so much of an Act of the sixth Year of the Reign of his present Majesty, as relates to the prohibiting the Importation of foreign-wrought Silks and Velvets. (Repealed by Customs Law Repeal Act 1825 (6 Geo. 4. c. 105))
Goods in Neutral Ships Act 1802 (repealed)	42 Geo. 3. c. 80	22 June 1802
An act for repealing several Acts, made in the thirty-fifth, thirty-sixth, and thirty-ninth and fortieth Years of the Reign of his present Majesty, relating to the Admission of certain Articles of Merchandize in Neutral Ships, and to the issuing of Orders in Council for that Purpose, and for making other Provisions in lieu thereof, to continue until the first Day of January One thousand eight hundred and four. (Repealed by Statute Law Revision Act 1872 (35 & 36 Vict. c. 63))
Post Office Act 1802 (repealed)	42 Geo. 3. c. 81	22 June 1802
An act for amending so much of an Act, passed in the seventh Year of the Reign of his present Majesty, as relates to the secreting, embezzling, or destroying any Letter or Packet sent by the Post; and for the better Protection of such Letters and Packets; and for more effectually preventing such Letters and Packets being sent otherwise than by the Post. (Repealed by Post Office (Repeal of Laws) Act 1837 (7 Will. 4 & 1 Vict. c. 32))
Smuggling Act 1802 (repealed)	42 Geo. 3. c. 82	22 June 1802
An act to alter, amend, and render more effectual an Act, made in the twenty-fourth Year of the Reign of his present Majesty, for the more effectual Prevention of Smuggling in Great Britain. (Repealed by Customs Law Repeal Act 1825 (6 Geo. 4. c. 105))
Duties, etc., on Coffee, etc. Act 1802 (repealed)	42 Geo. 3. c. 83	22 June 1802
An act to continue, until the twenty-ninth Day of September One thousand eight hundred and three, an Act, made in the Parliament of Ireland in the thirty-seventh Year of the Reign of his present Majesty, for regulating the Import, Export, and Sale of Coffee, and securing the Duties payable thereon; and also for securing the Duties payable on Licences to Persons in Ireland, not being Maltsters or Makers of Malt, selling Malt by Commission or otherwise. (Repealed by Statute Law Revision Act 1872 (35 & 36 Vict. c. 63))
Controverted Elections Act 1802 (repealed)	42 Geo. 3. c. 84	22 June 1802
An act for the further Regulation of the Trials of controverted Elections, or Returns of Members to serve in, and for expediting the Proceedings relating thereto. (Repealed by Controverted Elections Act 1828)
Criminal Jurisdiction Act 1802	42 Geo. 3. c. 85	22 June 1802
An Act for the trying and punishing in Great Britain Persons holding publick Employments, for Offences committed abroad; and for extending the Provisions of an Act passed in the Twenty-first Year of the Reign of King James made for the Ease of Justices and others in pleading in Suits brought against them, to all Persons, either in or out of this Kingdom, authorized to commit to safe Custody.
Pluralities of Living, etc. Act 1802 (repealed)	42 Geo. 3. c. 86	22 June 1802
An act to continue, until the eighth Day of April One thousand eight hundred and three, an Act passed in the last Session of Parliament for staying Proceedings in Actions under the Statute of King Henry the Eighth, for abridging Spiritual Persons from having Pluralities of Livings, and of taking of Ferms; and also to stay Proceedings in Action, under an Act of the thirteenth Year of Queen Elizabeth, touching Leases of Benefices, and other Ecclesiastical Livings, with Cure. (Repealed by Statute Law Revision Act 1872 (35 & 36 Vict. c. 63))
Parliament House, Dublin Act 1802 or the Parliament House Act 1802	42 Geo. 3. c. 87	22 June 1802
An Act to enable the Lord High Treasurer, or Commissioners of his Majesty’s Treasury of Ireland for the Time being, to sell, lease, convey, or dispose of the Parliament House in the City of Dublin, and all the Premises and Appurtenances thereunto belonging, to the Governor and Company of the Bank of Ireland.
Mutiny (No. 3) Act 1802 (repealed)	42 Geo. 3. c. 88	22 June 1802
An act for punishing Mutiny and Desertion; and for the better Payment of the Army and their Quarters. (Repealed by Statute Law Revision Act 1872 (35 & 36 Vict. c. 63))
Lands for Ordnance Services, Woolwich Act 1802	42 Geo. 3. c. 89	22 June 1802
An act for vesting certain Lands and Hereditaments in Trustees, for promoting the Service of his Majesty's Ordnance at Woolwich.
Militia Act 1802 (repealed)	42 Geo. 3. c. 90	26 June 1802
An Act for amending the Laws relating to the Militia in England, and for augmenting the Militia. (Repealed by Reserve Forces Act 1980)
Militia (Scotland) Act 1802 (repealed)	42 Geo. 3. c. 91	26 June 1802
An Act to raise and establish a Militia Force in Scotland. (Repealed by Reserve Forces Act 1980)
Aliens Act 1802 (repealed)	42 Geo. 3. c. 92	26 June 1802
An act for repealing several Acts for establishing Regulations respecting Aliens arriving in this Kingdom, or reliant therein, in certain Cases; and for substituting other Provisions in lieu thereof. (Repealed by Statute Law Revision Act 1872 (35 & 36 Vict. c. 63))
Excise Act 1802 (repealed)	42 Geo. 3. c. 93	26 June 1802
An act for exempting from the Auction Duty Estates and Effects bought in for the Owner, and Goods imported in any British Ship from any British Colony in America, or from any Part of the United States; for better collecting and securing the Duties of Excise on Wine, Home-made Spirits, Starch, Auctioneers, Rum shipped as Stores, and on Goods or Merchandize chargeable with Duties of Excise; for granting a further Allowance of Salt in the curing and preserving of Pilchards and Scads; and for allowing certain Draining Tiles to be made free of Duty. (Repealed by Statute Law Revision Act 1861 (24 & 25 Vict. c. 101))
Paper Duties Act 1802 (repealed)	42 Geo. 3. c. 94	26 June 1802
An act for repealing certain Duties on Paper, Pasteboards, Millboards, Scaleboards, and Glazed Paper, imported into or made in Great Britain; and for granting other Duties in lieu thereof. (Repealed by Duties on Paper Act 1839 (2 & 3 Vict. c. 23))
Customs Act 1802 (repealed)	42 Geo. 3. c. 95	26 June 1802
An act for repealing the Duties, granted by an Act made in this Session of Parliament, on Spermaceti Oil, Blubber, Train Oil, Fish Oil, or Oil of Seals, and granting other Duties in lieu thereof; for repealing the Duties, granted by the said Act, on Linen Yarn made of Flax, and on Goods, Wares, or Merchandize imported by the East India Company, and exported from the Warehouse in which the same shall have been secured; for exempting Stone, the Produce of Guernsey, Jersey, Alderney, Sark, or Man, from Duty; and for permitting Merchandize, the Produce of any of the Colonies ceded to the French and Batavian Republicks, to be imported for three Years from the passing of this Act, upon Payment of certain Duties. (Repealed by Customs Law Repeal Act 1825 (6 Geo. 4. c. 105))
Excise Act (No. 2) 1802 (repealed)	42 Geo. 3. c. 96	26 June 1802
An act to authorize the Commissioners of Excise to order the Restoration of Exciseable Goods seized or detained by Officers of Excise. (Repealed by Statute Law Revision Act 1872 (35 & 36 Vict. c. 63))
Use of Clarke's Hydrometer Act 1802 (repealed)	42 Geo. 3. c. 97	26 June 1802
An act to authorize the Lord High Treasurer or Commissioners of the Treasury in Great Britain, and the Lord High Treasurer or Commissioners of the Treasury in Ireland, to order the Use of the Hydrometers now employed in the Management of the Revenues, to be discontinued; and other Instruments to be used instead thereof. (Repealed by Customs Law Repeal Act 1825 (6 Geo. 4. c. 105))
Isle of Man Trade Act 1802 (repealed)	42 Geo. 3. c. 98	26 June 1802
An act to continue, until the fifth Day of July One thousand eight hundred and three, two Acts, made in the thirty-eighth Year of the Reign of his present Majesty, and in the last Session of Parliament, for the further Encouragement of the Trade and Manufactures of the Isle of Man; and for improving the Revenue thereof. (Repealed by Statute Law Revision Act 1872 (35 & 36 Vict. c. 63))
Stamps Act 1802 (repealed)	42 Geo. 3. c. 99	26 June 1802
An act for allowing the stamping certain Deeds until the thirty-first Day of December One thousand eight hundred and two; for amending an Act, passed in the thirty-sixth Year of the Reign of his present Majesty, relating to Duties on Legacies and Shares of Personal Estates; for exempting certain Legacies from the Payment of Duty; for reducing the Allowances on present Payment of Stamp Duties; and for reducing certain Stamp Duties on Policies for Sea Insurances. (Repealed by Inland Revenue Repeal Act 1870 (33 & 34 Vict. c. 99))
Duties on Horses, etc. Act 1802 (repealed)	42 Geo. 3. c. 100	26 June 1802
An act for enlarging the Time for which Horses may be let to Hire without being subject to any annual Duty; for explaining and amending several Acts relating to the Duties on Horses, Servants, and Carriages; and for authorizing the Allowance in the Accounts of the Receivers General of the several Sums advanced by them, in pursuance of the Acts for raising a Provisional Force of Cavalry, and not reimbursed to them by Assessment. (Repealed by Statute Law Revision Act 1872 (35 & 36 Vict. c. 63))
Postage (No. 2) Act 1802 (repealed)	42 Geo. 3. c. 101	26 June 1802
An act for repealing the Rates and Duties of Postage upon Letters to and from France and the Batavian Republic from and to London, and for granting other Rates and Duties in lieu thereof; and for exempting from the Duty of Tonnage the Ships and Vessels to be employed in conveying the Mails of Letters from France to the United Kingdom of Great Britain and Ireland. (Repealed by Post Office (Repeal of Laws) Act 1837 (7 Will. 4 & 1 Vict. c. 32))
Tortola Trade Act 1802 (repealed)	42 Geo. 3. c. 102	26 June 1802
An act for enabling his Majesty to permit the Importation and Exportation of certain Goods and Commodities into and from the Port of Road Harbour in the Island of Tortola, until the first Day of July One thousand eight hundred and three, and from thence until six Weeks after the Commencement of the then next Session of Parliament. (Repealed by Statute Law Revision Act 1872 (35 & 36 Vict. c. 63))
Repeal, etc., of Certain Duties Act 1802 (repealed)	42 Geo. 3. c. 103	26 June 1802
An act to repeal the additional Duty of six Pounds per Centum on the Duties payable on the Importation into Ireland of certain Goods imported by Retailers or Consumers; and for repealing and reducing certain Duties on Policies of Insurance and Sea Insurances in Ireland. (Repealed by Statute Law Revision Act 1861 (24 & 25 Vict. c. 101))
Lottery Regulations Act 1802 (repealed)	42 Geo. 3. c. 104	26 June 1802
An act to require Persons licensed to keep Lottery Offices in Ireland, to divide into Shares a certain Number of whole Lottery Tickets; and for empowering the Lords Commissioners of his Majesty's Treasury of Great Britain to remit to the Exchequer of Ireland a certain Sum of Money out of the Contributions for Lotteries. (Repealed by Statute Law Revision Act 1872 (35 & 36 Vict. c. 63))
Lord Chancellor of Ireland Act 1802 (repealed)	42 Geo. 3. c. 105	26 June 1802
An act for providing a proper Salary for the Office of the Chancellor or Keeper of the Great Seal of Ireland. (Repealed by Statute Law Revision Act 1872 (35 & 36 Vict. c. 63))
Controverted Elections (No. 2) Act 1802 (repealed)	42 Geo. 3. c. 106	26 June 1802
An act for regulating the Trial of Controverted Elections or Returns of Members to serve in the United Parliament for Ireland. (Repealed by Statute Law Revision Act 1872 (35 & 36 Vict. c. 63))
Deer Stealing (England) Act 1802 (repealed)	42 Geo. 3. c. 107	26 June 1802
An act more effectually to prevent the dealing of Deer. (Repealed by Criminal Statutes Repeal Act 1827 (7 & 8 Geo. 4. c. 27) and for India by Criminal Law (India) Act 1828 (9 Geo. 4. c. 74))
Quartering of Soldiers Act 1802 (repealed)	42 Geo. 3. c. 108	26 June 1802
An act for increasing the Rates of Subsistence to be paid to Innkeepers and others on quartering Soldiers. (Repealed by Statute Law Revision Act 1872 (35 & 36 Vict. c. 63))
Militia (Ireland) (No. 1) Act 1802 (repealed)	42 Geo. 3. c. 109	26 June 1802
An act for authorizing and rendering valid the Discharge of certain Militia Men in Ireland; and for giving Indemnity to the several Counties and Places in Ireland, which may incur any Expence in consequence of the Discharge of certain Militia Men. (Repealed by Militia (Ireland) Act 1809)
Loans or Exchequer Bills (No. 3) Act 1802 (repealed)	42 Geo. 3. c. 110	26 June 1802
An act for raising the Sum of five Millions by Loans or Exchequer Bills, for the Service of Great Britain for the Year One thousand eight hundred and three. (Repealed by Statute Law Revision Act 1872 (35 & 36 Vict. c. 63))
Loans or Exchequer Bills (No. 4) Act 1802 (repealed)	42 Geo. 3. c. 111	26 June 1802
An act for raising the Sum of one million five hundred thousand Pounds, by Loans or Exchequer Bills, for the Service of Great Britain for the Year One thousand eight hundred and three. (Repealed by Statute Law Revision Act 1872 (35 & 36 Vict. c. 63))
National Debt (No. 4) Act 1802 (repealed)	42 Geo. 3. c. 112	26 June 1802
An act for granting to his Majesty the Sum of two hundred thousand Pounds, to be issued and paid to the Governor and Company of the Bank of England, to be by them placed to the Account of the Commissioners for the Reduction of the National Debt of Great Britain. (Repealed by Statute Law Revision Act 1861 (24 & 25 Vict. c. 101))
Annuity to Lord Hutchinson, etc. Act 1802 (repealed)	42 Geo. 3. c. 113	26 June 1802
An Act for settling and securing a certain Annuity on Lord Hutchinson, Baron Hutchinson of Alexandria, and of Knocklofty, in the County of Tipperary, and the Two next Persons to whom the Title of Baron Hutchinson shall descend, in consideration of his eminent Services. (Repealed by Statute Law Revision Act 1872 (35 & 36 Vict. c. 63))
Southern Whale Fishery (No. 2) Act 1802 (repealed)	42 Geo. 3. c. 114	26 June 1802
An act for extending the Provisions of two Acts of the thirty-fifth and thirty-eighth Years of his present Majesty, so far as they relate to the Encouragement of Persons coming to Milford Haven for the Purpose of carrying on the Southern Whale Fishery. (Repealed by Statute Law Revision Act 1872 (35 & 36 Vict. c. 63))
Marine Mutiny (No. 3) Act 1802 (repealed)	42 Geo. 3. c. 115	26 June 1802
An act for the Regulation of his Majesty's Royal Marine Forces while on Shore. (Repealed by Statute Law Revision Act 1872 (35 & 36 Vict. c. 63))
Land Tax Redemption Act 1802 (repealed)	42 Geo. 3. c. 116	26 June 1802
An act for consolidating the Provisions of the several Acts passed for the Redemption and Sale of the Land Tax, into one Act, and for making further Provision for the Redemption and Sale thereof; and for removing Doubts respecting the Right of Persons claiming to vote at Elections for Knights of the Shire and other Members to serve in Parliament, in respect of Messuages, Lands, or Tenements, the Land Tax upon which shall have been redeemed or purchased. (Repealed by Statute Law (Repeals) Act 1989 (c. 43))
Import and Export Duties Act 1802 (repealed)	42 Geo. 3. c. 117	28 June 1802
An act for granting to his Majesty, certain additional Duties on Goods imported into and exported from Ireland. (Repealed by Statute Law Revision Act 1861 (24 & 25 Vict. c. 101))
Militia (Ireland) (No. 2) Act 1802 (repealed)	42 Geo. 3. c. 118	28 June 1802
An act for defraying the Charge of the Pay of the Militia of Ireland, until the twenty-fifth Day of March One thousand eight hundred and three; and for holding Courts Martial on Serjeant Majors, Serjeants, Corporals, and Drummers, for Offences committed during the Time such Militia shall not be embodied. (Repealed by Statute Law Revision Act 1872 (35 & 36 Vict. c. 63))
Gaming Act 1802	42 Geo. 3. c. 119	28 June 1802
An act to suppress certain Games and Lotteries not authorized by Law.
Appropriation Act 1802 (repealed)	42 Geo. 3. c. 120	28 June 1802
An act for granting to his Majesty certain Sums of Money out of the respective Consolidated Funds of Great Britain and Ireland; for applying certain Monies therein mentioned, for the Service of the Year One thousand eight hundred and two; and for further appropriating the Supplies granted in this Session of Parliament. (Repealed by Statute Law Revision Act 1872 (35 & 36 Vict. c. 63))

=== Local acts ===
Short title	Citation	Royal assent
Long title
Truro Roads and Steppings Bridge Act 1802 (repealed)	42 Geo. 3. c. iv	24 February 1802
An Act for continuing the Term and altering and enlarging the Powers of Two Acts; the One, passed in the Thirteenth Year of the Reign of His present Majesty, for more effectually amending several Roads leading from and near the Borough of Truro, in the County of Cornwall, and for building and keeping in Repair a Bridge over the River at a place called the Steppings, in or near the said Borough; (Note: Truro Roads Act 1773 (13 Geo. 3. c. 112)) and the other, passed in the Twenty-second Year of the Reign of His present Majesty, for extending the Provisions of the said former Act to the several other Roads therein described. (Note: Truro Roads Act 1782 (22 Geo. 3. c. 89)) (Repealed by Truro Roads Act 1828 (c.iii))
Road from Canterbury to Ramsgate Act 1802	42 Geo. 3. c. v	19 March 1802
Road from Canterbury to Sandwich Act 1802	42 Geo. 3. c. vi	19 March 1802
Road from Chesterfield to Matlock Bridge Act 1802 (repealed)	42 Geo. 3. c. vii	19 March 1802
(Repealed by Road from Chesterfield to Matlock Bridge Act 1823 (c.xxviii))
Woodbridge and Eye Road Act 1802 (repealed)	42 Geo. 3. c. viii	19 March 1802
(Repealed by Statute Law (Repeals) Act 2008 (c. 12))
Road from Union Point to Langney Bridge Act 1802 (repealed)	42 Geo. 3. c. ix	19 March 1802
(Repealed by Roads from Union Point and from Horsebridge Act 1823 (c.xii))
Road from Falmouth Act 1802 (repealed)	42 Geo. 3. c. x	19 March 1802
(Repealed by Falmouth and Marazion Road Act 1823 (c.lxxviii))
Barkeswell Inclosure Act 1802	42 Geo. 3. c. xi	19 March 1802
Wilmslow and Church Lawton Road Act 1802 (repealed)	42 Geo. 3. c. xii	24 March 1802
(Repealed by Wilmslow Bridge and Church Lawton Road Act 1824 (c.lxxxvii))
Shoreditch Improvement Act 1802 (repealed)	42 Geo. 3. c. xiii	24 March 1802
(Repealed by London Government (Borough of Shoreditch) Order in Council 1901 (SR&O 1901/221))
Road from Finford Bridge to Banbury Act 1802 (repealed)	42 Geo. 3. c. xiv	24 March 1802
(Repealed by Road from Finford Bridge to Banbury Act 1822 (c.xcv))
Road from Leeds to Otley Act 1802 (repealed)	42 Geo. 3. c. xv	24 March 1802
(Repealed by Roads from Leeds to Otley Act 1821 (c.xciv))
Road from Shoreditch to the Mile End Turnpike Act 1802 (repealed)	42 Geo. 3. c. xvi	24 March 1802
(Repealed by Road from Shoreditch Church through Hackney Act 1821 (c.cxii))
Saltash Roads Act 1802 (repealed)	42 Geo. 3. c. xvii	24 March 1802
(Repealed by Saltash Roads Act 1823 (c.vi))
Galway County Gaol Act 1802	42 Geo. 3. c. xviii	15 April 1802
Downham Market, Wimbotsham, Stow Bardolph and Denver Drainage Act 1802	42 Geo. 3. c. xix	15 April 1802
Ellesmere and Chester Canal Act 1802 (repealed)	42 Geo. 3. c. xx	15 April 1802
An Act for repealing so much of an Act, passed in the Thirty third Year of His present Majesty, intituled "An Act for making and maintaining a Navigable Canal from the River Severn at Shrewsbury, in the County of Salop, to the River Mersey, at or near Netherpool, in the County of Chester, and also for making and maintaining certain Collateral Cuts from the said intended Canal," (Note: Ellesmere and Chester Canal Act 1793 (33 Geo. 3. c. 91)) as restrains the Company of Proprietors of the said Canal from taking Tonnage on Coals, Coak, Culm, Lime or Limestone, upon a Part of the said Canal; and for authorizing the said Company of Proprietors to raise a Sum of Money to make up the Amount of their original Subscription; and for further amending the several Acts passed, relative to the making of the said Canal. (Repealed by Ellesmere and Chester Canal Act 1827 (c.cii))
Roads from Barnsley Common and from Barugh (Yorkshire) Act 1802 (repealed)	42 Geo. 3. c. xxi	15 April 1802
(Repealed by Roads from Barnsley Common and from Barugh Act 1823 (c.lxvi))
Runham Inclosure Act 1802	42 Geo. 3. c. xxii	15 April 1802
Road from Horsham Act 1802 (repealed)	42 Geo. 3. c. xxiii	15 April 1802
(Repealed by Road from Horsham to Epsom Act 1823 (c.lxxxvi))
Bedford Level (South Level, Second District) Drainage Act 1802	42 Geo. 3. c. xxiv	15 April 1802
Trent and Mersey Canal (Railways) Act 1802 (repealed)	42 Geo. 3. c. xxv	15 April 1802
An Act to enable the Company of Proprietors of the Navigation from the Trent to the Mersey, to make Railways, to alter the Course of the Railway from Froghall to Caldon, and Part of the Course of the Canal from Froghall to Uttoxeter; and to amend the Trent and Mersey Canal Acts. (Repealed by Trent and Mersey Canal Act 1831 (1 Will. 4. c. lv))
Otley, Skipton and Colne Roads Act 1802 (repealed)	42 Geo. 3. c. xxvi	15 April 1802
(Repealed by Otley and Skipton Road Act 1823 (c.xxxi))
Dundee Two Pennies Scots Act 1802 (repealed)	42 Geo. 3. c. xxvii	15 April 1802
(Repealed by Statute Law (Repeals) Act 2013 (c. 2))
St. Mary Islington Poor Relief Act 1802 (repealed)	42 Geo. 3. c. xxviii	15 April 1802
(Repealed by St. Mary Islington Improvement Act 1824 (c.cxxv))
Alrewas Inclosure Act 1802	42 Geo. 3. c. xxix	15 April 1802
An Act for dividing, allotting, inclosing and improving certain Open Meadows, Commonable Lands, and Waste Grounds, within or belonging to the Manor or Parish of Alrewas, in the County of Stafford.
Rhoshirwaun Inclosure Act 1802	42 Geo. 3. c. xxx	15 April 1802
An Act for dividing, allotting and inclosing a Tract of Common and Waste Lands, called Rhoshirwaun, situate in the several Parishes of Aberdaron, Llanfaelrhys and Bryncroes, in the County of Caernarvon.
Richmond (Yorkshire) Inclosure Act 1802	42 Geo. 3. c. xxxi	15 April 1802
Kempston Inclosure Act 1802	42 Geo. 3. c. xxxii	15 April 1802
Kelso Two Pennies Scots Act 1802 (repealed)	42 Geo. 3. c. xxxiii	30 April 1802
(Repealed by Statute Law (Repeals) Act 2013 (c. 2))
Mountjoy Square (Dublin) Improvement Act 1802	42 Geo. 3. c. xxxiv	30 April 1802
Somersetshire Coal Canal Navigation Act 1802	42 Geo. 3. c. xxxv	30 April 1802
An Act for enabling the Company of Proprietors of the Somersetshire Coal Canal Navigation, to vary and alter the Lines of the said Canal; to raise Money for completing the said Canal and Works; and to alter and amend the Powers and Provisions the several Acts passed for making the said Canal.
Road from Westwood Gate to Barton Seagrove Act 1802	42 Geo. 3. c. xxxvi	30 April 1802
Road from Kettering to Newport Pagnell Act 1802 (repealed)	42 Geo. 3. c. xxxvii	30 April 1802
(Repealed by Road from Kettering to Newport Pagnell Act 1823 (c.lxvii))
Banbury, Brailes and Barcheston Road Act 1802 (repealed)	42 Geo. 3. c. xxxviii	30 April 1802
(Repealed by Banbury, Brailes and Barcheston Road Act 1823 (c.cv))
Wrexham and Barnhill Road Act 1802 (repealed)	42 Geo. 3. c. xxxix	30 April 1802
(Repealed by Wrexham and Barnhill Road and Branch Act 1823 (c.xlv))
Road from Beattock to the River Sark Act 1802 (repealed)	42 Geo. 3. c. xl	30 April 1802
(Repealed by Roads in Dumfries Act 1819 (c.cx))
Duke of Norfolk's Estate Act 1802	42 Geo. 3. c. xli	30 April 1802
Egton-with-Newland Inclosure Act 1802	42 Geo. 3. c. xlii	30 April 1802
Tinmouth Castle Lighthouse Act 1802	42 Geo. 3. c. xliii	4 May 1802
An Act for improving the Tinmouth Castle Light House and Light; and for authorizing additional Light Duties in respect of such Improvement.
Ashby-de-la-Zouch and Tutbury Road Act 1802 (repealed)	42 Geo. 3. c. xliv	4 May 1802
(Repealed by Ashby-de-la-Zouch and Tutbury Road Act 1824 (c.ci))
Newent Roads Act 1802 (repealed)	42 Geo. 3. c. xlv	4 May 1802
(Repealed by Roads from Newent Act 1824 (c.xi))
Walpole's Estate Act 1802	42 Geo. 3. c. xlvi	4 May 1802
Aberdeen City Gaol Act 1802	42 Geo. 3. c. xlvii	7 May 1802
An Act for building and maintaining a House of Correction in and for the City and County of Aberdeen, and for raising a Fund for defraying the Charges of apprehending, prosecuting and subsisting Criminals, Rogues and Vagabonds, found within the said City and Liberties thereof.
Kilmarnock Improvement Act 1802 (repealed)	42 Geo. 3. c. xlviii	7 May 1802
(Repealed by Kilmarnock Municipal Extension and Improvement Act 1871 (c.lxxi))
Port of London Improvement and City Canal Act 1802 (repealed)	42 Geo. 3. c. xlix	7 May 1802
An Act to authorize the Advancement of further Sums of Money out of the Consolidated Fund, for completing the Canal, and other Works, which by an Act passed in Thirty ninth Year of his present Majesty's Reign, intituled "An Act for rendering more commodious, and for better regulating the Port of London," (Note: Port of London Improvement and City Canal Act 1799 (39 Geo. 3. c. lxix)) were directed to be made and done by the Mayor, Aldermen, and Commons of the City of London, in Common Council assembled. (Repealed by Thames Conservancy Act 1894 (57 & 58 Vict. c. clxxxvii))
Holderness Drainage Act 1802	42 Geo. 3. c. l	7 May 1802
Bangor Ferry and Pentre Voelas Road Act 1802 (repealed)	42 Geo. 3. c. li	7 May 1802
(Repealed by Shrewsbury to Holyhead Roads Act 1819)
Stockbridge, Winchester, Bishop's Waltham and Southampton Roads Act 1802 (repealed)	42 Geo. 3. c. lii	7 May 1802
(Repealed by Stockbridge, Winchester and Southampton Roads Act 1823 (c.xv))
Williams' Estate Act 1802	42 Geo. 3. c. liii	7 May 1802
Lefevre's Estate Act 1802	42 Geo. 3. c. liv	7 May 1802
Highways and Bridges in Wigtownshire Act 1802 (repealed)	42 Geo. 3. c. lv	24 May 1802
(Repealed by Wigtownshire Roads Act 1865 (c.ccxii))
Chatham Workhouse and Poor Relief Act 1802 (repealed)	42 Geo. 3. c. lvi	24 May 1802
(Repealed by County of Kent Act 1981 (c. xviii))
Norwich Workhouse Act 1802	42 Geo. 3. c. lvii	24 May 1802
Somerset Drainage and River Axe Navigation Act 1802	42 Geo. 3. c. lviii	24 May 1802
Roads from Stretford's Bridge and Mortimer's Cross, Hereford Act 1802 (repealed)	42 Geo. 3. c. lix	24 May 1802
(Note: Hereford Roads Act 1781 (21 Geo. 3. c. 105)) (Note: Hereford and Salop Roads Act 1758 (32 Geo. 2. c. 66)) (Note: Hereford Roads Act 1748(22 Geo. 2. c. 15)) (Repealed by Stretford's Bridge and Cross Moor Roads Act 1824 (c.cxlii))
Henley Bridge Roads Act 1802 (repealed)	42 Geo. 3. c. lx	24 May 1802
(Note: Henley Bridge in Henley-on-Thames. 51°32′15″N 0°54′01″W) (Repealed by Henley Bridge Roads Act 1821 (c.xxvi))
Chester and Whitchurch Road Act 1802	42 Geo. 3. c. lxi	24 May 1802
Worthing and West Grinstead Park Road Act 1802 (repealed)	42 Geo. 3. c. lxii	24 May 1802
(Repealed by Offington Corner and West Grinstead Park Road Act 1823 (c.xxvii))
Roads in Kent and Surrey Act 1802 (repealed)	42 Geo. 3. c. lxiii	24 May 1802
(Repealed by New Cross Turnpike Roads Act 1826 (c.cxxv))
Road from Great Staughton to Lavendon Act 1802 (repealed)	42 Geo. 3. c. lxiv	24 May 1802
(Repealed by Road from Great Staughton to Lavendon Act 1823 (c.lxxxv))
Road from Maidstone to Cranbrook Act 1802	42 Geo. 3. c. lxv	24 May 1802
Kidwelly District of Roads Act 1802 (repealed)	42 Geo. 3. c. lxvi	24 May 1802
(Repealed by Kidwelly District of Roads Act 1824 (c.ii))
Earl of Bute's Estate Act 1802	42 Geo. 3. c. lxvii	24 May 1802
Silvertop's Estate Act 1802	42 Geo. 3. c. lxviii	24 May 1802
Henllan Inclosure Act 1802	42 Geo. 3. c. lxix	24 May 1802
Mickleton and Romaldkirk Inclosures Act 1802	42 Geo. 3. c. lxx	24 May 1802
An Act for dividing, allotting and inclosing the Moor or Common, Open Fields, Stinted Pastures and other Commonable Lands, within the Township of Mickleton, and Parish of Romaldkirk, in the North Riding of the County of York.
Liverpool Exchange Act 1802	42 Geo. 3. c. lxxi	28 May 1802
An Act for enabling certain Persons in the Town and Port of Liverpool, in the County Palatine of Lancaster, to erect an Exchange there, for the Accommodation of themselves, and the Merchants and others concerned in Trade in the said Town and Port; and for incorporating the Proprietors thereof.
Parish Church of St. Anne, Westminster Act 1802 (repealed)	42 Geo. 3. c. lxxii	28 May 1802
An Act for completing the rebuilding of the Tower of the Parish Church of Saint Anne, within the Liberty of Westminster in the County of Middlesex, and a new Vestry Room, Watch House, Engine House, and Vaults, for the Use of the said Parish; and for repairing the said Church, improving the Church Yard, and making certain Regulations relating to the said Parish. (Repealed by St. Anne, Soho Act 1965 (c. v))
Temple Bar Improvement Act 1802	42 Geo. 3. c. lxxiii	28 May 1802
An Act for raising a further Sum of Money for carrying into Execution Three several Acts, passed in the Thirty fifth, (Note: Temple Bar, etc. Act 1795 (35 Geo. 3. c. 126)) Thirty eighth, (Note: Temple Bar Improvement Act 1798 (38 Geo. 3. c. lxi)) and in the Thirty ninth and Fortieth (Note: Temple Bar Improvement Act 1800 (39 & 40 Geo. 3. c. xlii)) Years of the Reign of His present Majesty, for widening and improving the Entrance into the City of London, near Temple Bar; and for making a more commodious Street or Passage at Snow Hill; and for raising on the Credit of the Orphans' Fund a Sum of Money for those Purposes; and for explaining, amending and enlarging the Powers of the said Acts.
Catfield and Sutton (Norfolk) Inclosures and Drainage Act 1802	42 Geo. 3. c. lxxiv	28 May 1802
Devon Roads Act 1802	42 Geo. 3. c. lxxv	28 May 1802
Surrey and Sussex Roads Act 1802 (repealed)	42 Geo. 3. c. lxxvi	28 May 1802
(Note: Surrey and Sussex Roads Act 1785 (25 Geo. 3. c. 117)) (Repealed by Southwark and Highgate (Sussex) Roads Act 1828 (c.cxx))
Tyburn, Uxbridge and Brent Bridge Roads Act 1802 (repealed)	42 Geo. 3. c. lxxvii	28 May 1802
(Repealed by Roads between Tyburn and Uxbridge Act 1826 (c.lxxvi))
Uppleby's Estate Act 1802	42 Geo. 3. c. lxxviii	28 May 1802
Westbury Inclosure Act 1802	42 Geo. 3. c. lxxix	28 May 1802
Carmarthenshire Railway or Tramroad Company Act 1802 or the Llanelly Railway and Dock Act 1802	42 Geo. 3. c. lxxx	3 June 1802
An Act for making and maintaining a Railway or Tramroad, from or from near a certain Place called The Flats, in the Parish of Llanelly, in the County of Carmarthen, to or near to certain Lime Rocks, called Castell-y-Garreg, in the Parish of Llanfihangel-Aberbythich, in the said County; and for making and maintaining a Dock or Bason at the Termination of the said Railway or Tramroad, at or near the said Place called The Flats.
Welsh Harp and Stone Bridge, and Castle Bromwich and Birmingham Roads Act 1802 (repealed)	42 Geo. 3. c. lxxxi	3 June 1802
(Repealed by Welsh Harp and Stone Bridge, and Castle Bromwich and Birmingham Roads Act 1823 (c.cxxi))
Roads from Liverpool Act 1802 (repealed)	42 Geo. 3. c. lxxxii	3 June 1802
(Repealed by Roads from Liverpool Act 1821 (c.xv))
Alfreton and Derby Roads Act 1802 (repealed)	42 Geo. 3. c. lxxxiii	3 June 1802
An Act for widening, altering, improving and repairing the Road leading from Alfreton, in the County of Derby, to the Town of Derby. (Repealed by Alfreton and Derby Roads Act 1823 (c.xli))
Prescott's Estate Act 1802	42 Geo. 3. c. lxxxiv	3 June 1802
Glover's Estate Act 1802	42 Geo. 3. c. lxxxv	3 June 1802
Glasgow Glebe Lands Act 1802	42 Geo. 3. c. lxxxvi	22 June 1802
An Act for feuing the Glebe of the Parish of the Barony of Glasgow, in the County of Lanark.
Prebend of Prees Estate Act 1802	42 Geo. 3. c. lxxxvii	22 June 1802
London Fish Trade Act 1802 (repealed)	42 Geo. 3. c. lxxxviii	22 June 1802
(Repealed by Statute Law (Repeals) Act 2013 (c. 2))
Westminster Coal Trade Act 1802 (repealed)	42 Geo. 3. c. lxxxix	22 June 1802
(Repealed by London, Westminster, Middlesex, Surrey, Kent and Essex Coal Trade Act 1807 (c.lxviii))
Maidstone Improvement Act 1802 (repealed)	42 Geo. 3. c. xc	22 June 1802
(Repealed by Local Government Supplemental Act 1866 (No. 4))
Kingston-upon-Hull Docks Act 1802	42 Geo. 3. c. xci	22 June 1802
Dublin Water Act 1802	42 Geo. 3. c. xcii	22 June 1802
Bradford (Yorkshire) Canal Navigation's Estate Act 1802	42 Geo. 3. c. xciii	22 June 1802
An Act for vesting divers Estates in the Parishes of Bradford and Calverley, in the West Riding of the County of York, purchased for the Benefit of the Proprietors of the Bradford Canal Navigation, in Trustees, upon certain Trusts, discharged from all Claims of the Crown in respect of any Forfeiture incurred under or by virtue of the Laws or Statutes of Mortmain.
Medway Lower Navigation Act 1802	42 Geo. 3. c. xciv	22 June 1802
An Act for repealing an Act passed in the Thirty second Year of His present Majesty's Reign, (Note: Medway Navigation Act 1792 (32 Geo. 3. c. 105)) for improving the Navigation of the River Medway, from the Town of Maidstone, through the several Parishes of Maidstone, Boxley, Allington and Aylesford, in the County of Kent; and for the better and more effectually improving the Navigation of the said River.
Saxelby, Harby and Broadholm Inclosures Act 1802	42 Geo. 3. c. xcv	22 June 1802
Boston (Witham) Bridges and Improvement Act 1802	42 Geo. 3. c. xcvi	22 June 1802
Stirling and Queensferry Road Act 1802	42 Geo. 3. c. xcvii	22 June 1802
Roads from Uttoxeter, Cliff Bank and Lower Lane Act 1802	42 Geo. 3. c. xcviii	22 June 1802
Wirksworth and Hulland Ward Road Act 1802 (repealed)	42 Geo. 3. c. xcix	22 June 1802
(Repealed by Roads from the Wirksworth Turnpike Road Act 1830 (c.cv))
Road from Dunchurch to Stonebridge Act 1802 (repealed)	42 Geo. 3. c. c	22 June 1802
(Repealed by Road from Dunchurch to Stonebridge Act 1824 (c.xliii))
Roads from West India Docks Act 1802 or the Commercial Road Act 1802 (repealed)	42 Geo. 3. c. ci	22 June 1802
(Repealed by Commercial and East India and Barking Roads Act 1828 (9 Geo. 4. c. cxii))
Viscountess Fane's Estate Act 1802	42 Geo. 3. c. cii	22 June 1802
Beardsworth and Williams (Trust) Estates Act 1802	42 Geo. 3. c. ciii	22 June 1802
Whitehead's Estate Act 1802	42 Geo. 3. c. civ	22 June 1802
Paul's Estate Act 1802	42 Geo. 3. c. cv	22 June 1802
Sewerby and Marton Inclosures Act 1802	42 Geo. 3. c. cvi	22 June 1802
Flixton Inclosure Act 1802	42 Geo. 3. c. cvii	22 June 1802
Wildmore Fen Inclosure Act 1802	42 Geo. 3. c. cviii	22 June 1802
Shitlington and Holwell Inclosures Act 1802	42 Geo. 3. c. cix	22 June 1802
Wirksworth Inclosure and Water Supply Act 1802	42 Geo. 3. c. cx	22 June 1802
River Itchin Navigation Act 1802	42 Geo. 3. c. cxi	26 June 1802
Thurso Harbour Act 1802	42 Geo. 3. c. cxii	26 June 1802
West India Dock Company Act 1802 (repealed)	42 Geo. 3. c. cxiii	26 June 1802
An Act to alter and amend an Act, passed in the Thirty ninth Year of His present Majesty's Reign, intituled "An Act for rendering more commodious and for better regulating the Port of London," (Note: Port of London Improvement Act 1800 (39 & 40 Geo. 3. c. xlvii)) so far as the same relates to the Concerns of the West India Dock Company thereby established, and for extending to other Objects the Compensations directed to be made by the said Act. (Repealed by West India Docks Act 1831 (1 & 2 Will. 4. c. lii))
Glenkens Canal Act 1802	42 Geo. 3. c. cxiv	26 June 1802
An Act for making and maintaining a navigable Canal from the Boat Pool of Dalry in the Glenkenns to the Port and Town of Kirkcudbright, in the Stewartry of Kirkcudbright.
Monmouthshire Canal Navigation Act 1802	42 Geo. 3. c. cxv	26 June 1802
An Act for making and maintaining certain Railways, to communicate with the Monmouthshire Canal Navigation; and for enabling the Company of Proprietors of that Navigation to raise a further Sum of Money to complete their Undertaking; and for explaining and amending the Acts passed in the Thirty-second and Thirty-seventh Years of His present Majesty's Reign, relating thereto.
River Ancholme Drainage and Navigation Act 1802	42 Geo. 3. c. cxvi	26 June 1802
An Act for altering and enlarging the Powers of an Act, passed in the Seventh Year of the Reign of His present Majesty, intituled "An Act for the more effectual draining the Lands lying in the Level of Ancholme, in the County of Lincoln, and making the River Ancholme navigable from the River Humber, at or near a Place called Ferraby Sluice, in the County of Lincoln, to the Town of Glamford Briggs, and for continuing the said Navigation up or near to the said River from thence to Bishop Briggs, in the said County of Lincoln."
Berwick and Durham Roads and Tweed Bridges Act 1802 (repealed)	42 Geo. 3. c. cxvii	26 June 1802
(Repealed by Durham and Berwick Roads and Bridges Act 1819 (c.lviii))
Taylor and Otway Estates Act 1802	42 Geo. 3. c. cxviii	26 June 1802
Coningsby Inclosure Act 1802	42 Geo. 3. c. cxix	26 June 1802
An Act for dividing, allotting, and inclosing the Open Arable Fields, Meadows, Commons, and other Commonable and Waste Lands, within the Parish of Coningsby otherwise Conesby, in the County of Lincoln.

=== Private acts ===
Short title	Citation	Royal assent
Long title
Hayneford Inclosure Act 1802	42 Geo. 3. c. 10 Pr.	24 February 1802
An Act for dividing allotting and inclosing the Warren, Commons, and Waste Grounds, within the Parish of Hayneford in the County of Norfolk.
Delord's Naturalization Act 1802	42 Geo. 3. c. 11 Pr.	24 February 1802
An Act for naturalizing John Aimé Delord.
Sneaton Inclosure Act 1802	42 Geo. 3. c. 12 Pr.	19 March 1802
An Act for dividing, allotting, and inclosing, the Commons and Waste Lands, within the Parish of Sneaton in the North Riding of the County of York.
Handsworth (Yorkshire, West Riding) Inclosure Act 1802	42 Geo. 3. c. 13 Pr.	19 March 1802
Filby Inclosure Act 1802	42 Geo. 3. c. 14 Pr.	19 March 1802
Pitney or Pitney Lortie (Somerset) Inclosure Act 1802	42 Geo. 3. c. 15 Pr.	19 March 1802
Finingham and Gislingham Inclosure Act 1802	42 Geo. 3. c. 16 Pr.	19 March 1802
Albers' Naturalization Act 1802	42 Geo. 3. c. 17 Pr.	19 March 1802
An Act for naturalizing Johann Henrich Albers.
Wittenberg's Naturalization Act 1802	42 Geo. 3. c. 18 Pr.	19 March 1802
An Act for naturalizing Albert Wittenberg.
Buckland Inclosure Act 1802	42 Geo. 3. c. 19 Pr.	24 March 1802
Horningsea Inclosure Act 1802	42 Geo. 3. c. 20 Pr.	15 April 1802
Wooburn Inclosure Act 1802	42 Geo. 3. c. 21 Pr.	15 April 1802
Stratfield Mortimer Inclosure Act 1802	42 Geo. 3. c. 22 Pr.	15 April 1802
Broughton Inclosure Act 1802	42 Geo. 3. c. 23 Pr.	15 April 1802
Troddermain, Walton Wood, Askerton, and Lauercost (Cumberland) Inclosure Act 1802	42 Geo. 3. c. 24 Pr.	15 April 1802
West Aston and Middleton (Hampshire) Inclosure Act 1802	42 Geo. 3. c. 25 Pr.	15 April 1802
Cropwell Bishop or Great Cropwell (Nottinghamshire) Inclosure Act 1802	42 Geo. 3. c. 26 Pr.	15 April 1802
Pakenham (Suffolk) Inclosure Act 1802	42 Geo. 3. c. 27 Pr.	15 April 1802
Ellingham, Broome, Kirby Cane, and Geldestone (Norfolk) Inclosure Act 1802	42 Geo. 3. c. 28 Pr.	15 April 1802
Sawston (Cambridgeshire) Inclosure Act 1802	42 Geo. 3. c. 29 Pr.	15 April 1802
Baldwin Brightwell (Oxfordshire) Inclosure Act 1802	42 Geo. 3. c. 30 Pr.	15 April 1802
Silkstone, Hoyland Swaine, and Cawthorne (Yorkshire, West Riding) Inclosure Act 1802	42 Geo. 3. c. 31 Pr.	15 April 1802
Sotherton Moor (Suffolk) Inclosure Act 1802	42 Geo. 3. c. 32 Pr.	15 April 1802
Kolle's Naturalization Act 1802	42 Geo. 3. c. 33 Pr.	15 April 1802
An Act for naturalizing Henrich Kolle.
Duke of Argyll's Estate Act 1802	42 Geo. 3. c. 34 Pr.	30 April 1802
Kempsford and Dryffield Inclosure Act 1802	42 Geo. 3. c. 35 Pr.	30 April 1802
An Act for altering, amending, and rendering more effectual, an Act passed in the thirty-ninth Year of the Reign of his present Majesty, intituled "An Act for dividing, allotting, and inclosing, the Open and Common Fields, Common Meadows, Common Pastures, and Waste Lands, within the Parishes of Kempsford and Dryffield in the County of Gloucester;" (Note: Kempsford and Dryffield Inclosure Act 1799 (39 Geo. 3. c. 109 Pr.)) and for enlarging and extending the Powers of the Commissioners in the said Act named.
Abbotts Morton (Worcestershire) Inclosure Act 1802	42 Geo. 3. c. 36 Pr.	30 April 1802
Hargrave (Northamptonshire) Inclosure Act 1802	42 Geo. 3. c. 37 Pr.	30 April 1802
Weston-by-Welland and Sutton Bassett (Northamptonshire) Inclosure Act 1802	42 Geo. 3. c. 38 Pr.	30 April 1802
Oaksey Common (Wiltshire) Inclosure Act 1802	42 Geo. 3. c. 39 Pr.	30 April 1802
Great Barton (Suffolk) Inclosure Act 1802	42 Geo. 3. c. 40 Pr.	4 May 1802
Up-Lambourne (Berkshire) Inclosure Act 1802	42 Geo. 3. c. 41 Pr.	4 May 1802
Harwell (Berkshire) Inclosure Act 1802	42 Geo. 3. c. 42 Pr.	4 May 1802
Christchurch and Holdenhurst (Hampshire) Inclosure Act 1802	42 Geo. 3. c. 43 Pr.	4 May 1802
Everton and Everton-cum-Tetworth (Bedfordshire, Huntingdonshire, Cambridgeshire) Inclosure Act 1802	42 Geo. 3. c. 44 Pr.	4 May 1802
Cleckheaton and Scholes (Yorkshire, West Riding) Inclosure Act 1802	42 Geo. 3. c. 45 Pr.	4 May 1802
Nuneaton and Stockingford (Warwickshire) Inclosure Act 1802	42 Geo. 3. c. 46 Pr.	4 May 1802
Merthyr Tydvil (Glamorgan) Rectorial Glebe Act 1802	42 Geo. 3. c. 47 Pr.	7 May 1802
West Horsley (Surrey) Inclosure Act 1802	42 Geo. 3. c. 48 Pr.	7 May 1802
Manningford (Wiltshire) Inclosure Act 1802	42 Geo. 3. c. 49 Pr.	7 May 1802
Du Mont's Naturalization Act 1802	42 Geo. 3. c. 50 Pr.	7 May 1802
An Act for naturalizing James Lewis Du Mont.
Oliver and John Colt and David Mushet Estates Act 1802	42 Geo. 3. c. 51 Pr.	24 May 1802
Thomas Hunt's Estate Act 1802	42 Geo. 3. c. 52 Pr.	24 May 1802
William Hamond's Estate Act 1802	42 Geo. 3. c. 53 Pr.	24 May 1802
Richard and Ann Chapman's Estate Act 1802	42 Geo. 3. c. 54 Pr.	24 May 1802
Fenstanton (Huntingdonshire) Inclosure Act 1802	42 Geo. 3. c. 55 Pr.	24 May 1802
Rolleston (Staffordshire) Inclosure Act 1802	42 Geo. 3. c. 56 Pr.	24 May 1802
Halvergate (Norfolk) Inclosure Act 1802	42 Geo. 3. c. 57 Pr.	24 May 1802
Whatcote (Warwickshire) Inclosure Act 1802	42 Geo. 3. c. 58 Pr.	24 May 1802
Oldham (Lancashire) Inclosure Act 1802	42 Geo. 3. c. 59 Pr.	24 May 1802
Saltley and Washwood (Warwickshire) Inclosure Act 1802	42 Geo. 3. c. 60 Pr.	24 May 1802
Swerford (Oxfordshire) Inclosure Act 1802	42 Geo. 3. c. 61 Pr.	24 May 1802
Swinscoe (Staffordshire) Inclosure Act 1802	42 Geo. 3. c. 62 Pr.	24 May 1802
Denton (Huntingdonshire) Inclosure Act 1802	42 Geo. 3. c. 63 Pr.	24 May 1802
Birbury and Marton (Warwickshire) Inclosure Act 1802	42 Geo. 3. c. 64 Pr.	24 May 1802
Cardington (Bedfordshire) Inclosure Act 1802	42 Geo. 3. c. 65 Pr.	24 May 1802
Ellerton (Yorkshire, East Riding) Inclosure Act 1802	42 Geo. 3. c. 66 Pr.	24 May 1802
Ranskill and Scrooby (Northamptonshire) Inclosure Act 1802	42 Geo. 3. c. 67 Pr.	24 May 1802
Worthington, Breedon-on-the-Hill, and Newbold (Leicestershire) Inclosure Act 1802	42 Geo. 3. c. 68 Pr.	24 May 1802
Sinfin Moor (Derbyshire) Inclosure Act 1802	42 Geo. 3. c. 69 Pr.	24 May 1802
Churcham (Gloucestershire) Inclosure Act 1802	42 Geo. 3. c. 70 Pr.	24 May 1802
Hinxwoth (Hertfordshire) Inclosure Act 1802	42 Geo. 3. c. 71 Pr.	24 May 1802
Doxat's Naturalization Act 1802	42 Geo. 3. c. 72 Pr.	24 May 1802
An Act for naturalizing James Emanuel Francis Doxat.
Jain's Naturalization Act 1802	42 Geo. 3. c. 73 Pr.	24 May 1802
An Act for naturalizing John Benjamin Jain.
Frederick Scrope's Estate Act 1802	42 Geo. 3. c. 74 Pr.	29 October 1801 (Note: Start of session)
Alexander Hamilton's Estate Act 1802 (repealed)	42 Geo. 3. c. 75 Pr.	29 October 1801
(Repealed by Lady Ruthven's Estate Act 1840 (3 & 4 Vict. c. 24 Pr.))
Effingham East Court (Surrey) Inclosure Act 1802	42 Geo. 3. c. 76 Pr.	29 October 1801
Tharston (Norfolk) Inclosure Act 1802	42 Geo. 3. c. 77 Pr.	29 October 1801
Styrrup, Oldcoats, Farworth and Norney (Nottinghamshire) Inclosure Act 1802	42 Geo. 3. c. 78 Pr.	29 October 1801
Daventry (Northamptonshire) Inclosure Act 1802	42 Geo. 3. c. 79 Pr.	29 October 1801
Graveley (Cambridgeshire) Inclosure Act 1802	42 Geo. 3. c. 80 Pr.	29 October 1801
Spelbury (Oxfordshire) Inclosure Act 1802	42 Geo. 3. c. 81 Pr.	29 October 1801
Uphaven (Wiltshire) Inclosure Act 1802	42 Geo. 3. c. 82 Pr.	29 October 1801
Moulsoe (Buckinghamshire) Inclosure Act 1802	42 Geo. 3. c. 83 Pr.	29 October 1801
Coombe Byset or Bisset (Wiltshire) Inclosure Act 1802	42 Geo. 3. c. 84 Pr.	29 October 1801
West Grinstead and White Parish (Wiltshire) Inclosure Act 1802	42 Geo. 3. c. 85 Pr.	29 October 1801
Withernwick (Yorkshire, East Riding) Inclosure Act 1802	42 Geo. 3. c. 86 Pr.	29 October 1801
De Vandes' Naturalization Act 1802	42 Geo. 3. c. 87 Pr.	29 October 1801
An Act for naturalizing Alexandre de Vandes, commonly called Compte de Vandes.
Downshire's Estate Act 1802	42 Geo. 3. c. 88 Pr.	29 October 1801
Earl of Aylesford's and Worcester Cathedral Estates Act 1802	42 Geo. 3. c. 89 Pr.	29 October 1801
Lord Mulgrave's Estate Act 1802	42 Geo. 3. c. 90 Pr.	29 October 1801
Oliver Delancy's Estate Act 1802	42 Geo. 3. c. 91 Pr.	29 October 1801
Sir Charles and Charles Morgan's Estates Act 1802	42 Geo. 3. c. 92 Pr.	29 October 1801
Honourable Ann Fairfax's Estate and Gilling East Parish Church Act 1802	42 Geo. 3. c. 93 Pr.	29 October 1801
John Robinson's Estate Act 1802	42 Geo. 3. c. 94 Pr.	29 October 1801
Elizabeth Philips's Estate Act 1802	42 Geo. 3. c. 95 Pr.	29 October 1801
Robert and Ann Dundas's Marriage Settlement Act 1802	42 Geo. 3. c. 96 Pr.	29 October 1801
John Earl of Buckinghamshire's Estate Act 1802	42 Geo. 3. c. 97 Pr.	29 October 1801
Kelby, Aisby, Oseby, and Haydor (Lincolnshire) Inclosure Act 1802	42 Geo. 3. c. 98 Pr.	29 October 1801
West Challow (Berkshire) Inclosure Act 1802	42 Geo. 3. c. 99 Pr.	29 October 1801
Alvaston and Boulton (Derbyshire) Inclosure Act 1802	42 Geo. 3. c. 100 Pr.	29 October 1801
Thurlby (Lincolnshire) Inclosure Act 1802	42 Geo. 3. c. 101 Pr.	29 October 1801
Keyingham in Holderness (Yorkshire, East Riding) inclosure and compensation for tithes.	42 Geo. 3. c. 102 Pr.	29 October 1801
Chellaston (Derbyshire) Inclosure Act 1802	42 Geo. 3. c. 103 Pr.	29 October 1801
Kennington, Sunningwell, and Radley (Berkshire) Inclosure Act 1802	42 Geo. 3. c. 104 Pr.	29 October 1801
Walkeringham (Nottinghamshire) Inclosure Act 1802	42 Geo. 3. c. 105 Pr.	29 October 1801
Gooderstone (Norfolk) Inclosure Act 1802	42 Geo. 3. c. 106 Pr.	29 October 1801
Newton (Lancashire) Inclosure Act 1802	42 Geo. 3. c. 107 Pr.	29 October 1801
St. Giles Cambridge Inclosure Act 1802	42 Geo. 3. c. 108 Pr.	29 October 1801
An Act for dividing, allotting, laying in Severalty, and inclosing, the Open and Common Fields, Common Meadows, and other Open and Commonable Lands and Waste Grounds, within the Parish of Saint Giles, in the Town of Cambridge in the County of Cambridge.
Donington or Dinton (Buckinghamshire) Inclosure Act 1802	42 Geo. 3. c. 109 Pr.	29 October 1801
Bodenham (Herefordshire) Inclosure Act 1802	42 Geo. 3. c. 110 Pr.	29 October 1801
Folkton, and East and West Flotmanby (Yorkshire, East Riding) Inclosure Act 1802	42 Geo. 3. c. 111 Pr.	29 October 1801
Hannington (Northamptonshire) Inclosure Act 1802	42 Geo. 3. c. 112 Pr.	29 October 1801
Yskeibion (Denbighshire) Inclosure Act 1802	42 Geo. 3. c. 113 Pr.	29 October 1801
Ferry's Naturalization Act 1802	42 Geo. 3. c. 114 Pr.	29 October 1801
An Act for naturalizing Gabriel Dennis Ferry.
Droop's Naturalization Act 1802	42 Geo. 3. c. 115 Pr.	29 October 1801
An Act for naturalizing John Abraham Droop.
Meybohm's Naturalization Act 1802	42 Geo. 3. c. 116 Pr.	29 October 1801
An Act for naturalizing John Meybohm.
Bilston Curacy Estate Act 1802	42 Geo. 3. c. 117 Pr.	29 October 1801
Crofton Green (Yorkshire, West Riding) Inclosure Act 1802	42 Geo. 3. c. 118 Pr.	29 October 1801
George Bonham's Divorce Act 1802	42 Geo. 3. c. 119 Pr.	29 October 1801
Loggin's Name Act 1802	42 Geo. 3. c. 120 Pr.	29 October 1801
An Act for enabling the Reverend William Loggin to take and use the Surname and Arms of Cole, pursuant to the Will of his Uncle Edward Cole Esquire, deceased.

=== Sources ===
- Raithby, John (1802). "42° Geo. III". The Statutes of the United Kingdom of Great Britain and Ireland. Vol. 1. Containing the Acts 41 Geo. III. (1801.) and 42 Geo. III. (1802.). London: Eyre and Strahan. pp. 277–791 – via Google Books.
- "42° George III.". The Statutes of the United Kingdom of Great Britain and Ireland. Vol. The First. From A.D. 1801, 41 George III.—To AD 1803, 43 George III. London: Eyre and Strahan. 1804. pp. 257–653 – via Google Books.
- "42° George III.". The Statutes of the United Kingdom of Great Britain and Ireland. Vol. The First. From A.D. 1801, 41 George III.—To AD 1803, 43 George III. London: Eyre and Strahan. 1804. pp. 257–653 – via HathiTrust.
- Journal of the House of Commons. Vol. 57. London: His Majesty's Stationery Office. pp. 3–663.
- Chronological Table of and Index to the Statutes. Vol. 1: To the End of the Session 59 Vict. Sess. 2 (1895) (13th ed.). London: Her Majesty's Stationery Office. 1896. pp. 171–174 – via Google Books.
- "Statutes of the United Kingdom of Great Britain and Ireland, 1802". Irish Statute Book. Office of the Attorney General, Government of Ireland.

== See also ==
- List of acts of the Parliament of the United Kingdom
