= Listed buildings in Wateringbury =

Civil Parish in Kent, England

Wateringbury is a village and civil parish in the Tonbridge and Malling district of Kent, England. It contains 59 listed buildings that are recorded in the National Heritage List for England. Of these four grade II* and 55 are grade II.

This list is based on the information retrieved online from Historic England.

== Key ==
| Grade | Criteria |
|---|---|
| I | Buildings that are of exceptional interest |
| II* | Particularly important buildings of more than special interest |
| II | Buildings that are of special interest |

== Listing ==
| Name | Grade | Location | Type | Completed (Note: The date given is the date used by Historic England as significant for the initial building or that of an important part in the structure's description.) | Date designated | Grid ref. (Note: The grid reference is based on the British national grid reference system, sometimes known as OSGB36, used by the Ordnance Survey.) Geo-coordinates | Notes | Entry number (Note: The "List Entry Number" is a unique number assigned to each listed building and scheduled monument by Historic England.) | Image | Wikidata |
|---|---|---|---|---|---|---|---|---|---|---|
| 1 3 and 5, Bow Road | II | 1 3 and 5, Bow Road | | | 25 November 1983 | TQ6918053461; 51°15′19″N 0°25′23″E | | 1186245 | Upload Photo | Q26481505 |
| 59, Bow Road | II | 59, Bow Road | | | 19 April 1985 | TQ6909853233; 51°15′11″N 0°25′18″E | | 1070688 | Upload Photo | Q26324919 |
| 61, Bow Road | II | 61, Bow Road | | | 19 April 1985 | TQ6909653225; 51°15′11″N 0°25′18″E | | 1116542 | Upload Photo | Q26410142 |
| 63 and 65, Bow Road | II | 63 and 65, Bow Road | | | 19 April 1985 | TQ6909353211; 51°15′11″N 0°25′18″E | | 1363030 | Upload Photo | Q26644883 |
| 7, Bow Road | II | 7, Bow Road | | | 19 April 1985 | TQ6917053448; 51°15′18″N 0°25′22″E | | 1070687 | Upload Photo | Q26324915 |
| Former Goods Shed at Wateringbury Station | II | Bow Road | goods shed | | 12 October 1987 | TQ6907652814; 51°14′58″N 0°25′16″E | | 1363046 | Former Goods Shed at Wateringbury Station More images | Q26644896 |
| Lock Up | II | Bow Road | | | 19 April 1985 | TQ6914153440; 51°15′18″N 0°25′21″E | | 1186252 | Upload Photo | Q26481510 |
| The Wardens | II | 80, Bow Road | | | 1 August 1952 | TQ6902453115; 51°15′08″N 0°25′14″E | | 1070689 | Upload Photo | Q26324923 |
| Wateringbury Railway Station | II | Bow Road | railway station | | 19 April 1985 | TQ6916252849; 51°14′59″N 0°25′21″E | | 1363031 | Wateringbury Railway Station More images | Q2803677 |
| Barn 40 Yards West of Great Canon Court | II | Canon Lane | | | 19 April 1985 | TQ6820054542; 51°15′55″N 0°24′34″E | | 1319958 | Upload Photo | Q26606009 |
| Conservatory at Wateringbury Place | II | Canon Lane | | | 19 April 1985 | TQ6840753712; 51°15′28″N 0°24′44″E | | 1319926 | Upload Photo | Q26605982 |
| Gate Piers at Entrance to Wateringbury Place Service Yard | II | Canon Lane | | | 19 April 1985 | TQ6842053737; 51°15′29″N 0°24′44″E | | 1070691 | Upload Photo | Q26324929 |
| Great Canon Court | II | Canon Lane | | | 19 April 1985 | TQ6824954549; 51°15′55″N 0°24′37″E | | 1363033 | Upload Photo | Q26644885 |
| Outbuilding to North East of the Garage at Wateringbury Place | II | Canon Lane | | | 25 September 1978 | TQ6836253750; 51°15′29″N 0°24′41″E | | 1070692 | Upload Photo | Q26324932 |
| Outbuilding to South East of the Garage at Wateringbury Place | II | Canon Lane | | | 25 September 1978 | TQ6836253736; 51°15′29″N 0°24′41″E | | 1116439 | Upload Photo | Q26410052 |
| Terrace Balustrades to South of Wateringbury Place | II | Canon Lane | | | 19 April 1985 | TQ6844653682; 51°15′27″N 0°24′45″E | | 1070690 | Upload Photo | Q26324926 |
| The Garage at Wateringbury Place | II | Canon Lane | | | 19 April 1985 | TQ6834053744; 51°15′29″N 0°24′40″E | | 1116459 | Upload Photo | Q26410067 |
| Wateringbury Place | II* | Canon Lane | building | | 1 August 1952 | TQ6843053710; 51°15′28″N 0°24′45″E | | 1116485 | Wateringbury Place More images | Q17546880 |
| West Wall and Gates to Wateringbury Place | II | Canon Lane | | | 19 April 1985 | TQ6837953696; 51°15′27″N 0°24′42″E | | 1363032 | Upload Photo | Q26644884 |
| Wateringbury War Memorial Cross | II | Church Of St John The Baptist, Tonbridge Road, ME18 5PA | war memorial | | 9 January 2018 | TQ6851153623; 51°15′25″N 0°24′49″E | | 1451558 | Wateringbury War Memorial Cross More images | Q66479162 |
| 68 and 70, Danns Lane | II | 68 and 70, Danns Lane, Maidstone, ME18 5LN | | | 19 April 1985 | TQ6727653800; 51°15′32″N 0°23′45″E | | 1070693 | Upload Photo | Q26324935 |
| Former Hermitage Farmhouse | II | 72, 76 and 77, Danns Lane, Maidstone, ME18 5LW | | | 19 April 1985 | TQ6727853821; 51°15′32″N 0°23′46″E | | 1319948 | Upload Photo | Q26606000 |
| Mill Cottage | II | Mill Lane | | | 19 April 1985 | TQ6864753389; 51°15′17″N 0°24′55″E | | 1363034 | Upload Photo | Q26644886 |
| The Mill Pottery | II | 33, Mill Lane, Maidstone, ME18 5PE | watermill | | 19 April 1985 | TQ6865253366; 51°15′16″N 0°24′56″E | | 1363048 | The Mill Pottery More images | Q26644898 |
| 288-292, Old Road | II | 288-292, Old Road | | | 19 April 1985 | TQ6766653370; 51°15′17″N 0°24′05″E | | 1070655 | Upload Photo | Q26324833 |
| 309 and 311, Old Road | II | 309 and 311, Old Road | | | 19 April 1985 | TQ6758553348; 51°15′17″N 0°24′01″E | | 1070654 | Upload Photo | Q26324830 |
| Barn 20 Yards North West of Manor Farmhouse | II | Old Road | | | 19 April 1985 | TQ6819253464; 51°15′20″N 0°24′32″E | | 1363049 | Upload Photo | Q26644899 |
| Barn 30 Yards West of Manor Farmhouse | II | Old Road | | | 19 April 1985 | TQ6817253446; 51°15′19″N 0°24′31″E | | 1070653 | Upload Photo | Q26324826 |
| Manor Farmhouse | II | Old Road | | | 19 April 1985 | TQ6821953444; 51°15′19″N 0°24′33″E | | 1070652 | Upload Photo | Q26324823 |
| 159, Pizien Well Road | II | 159, Pizien Well Road | | | 19 April 1985 | TQ6743953045; 51°15′07″N 0°23′53″E | | 1070658 | Upload Photo | Q26324843 |
| 65, Pizien Well Road | II | 65, Pizien Well Road | | | 19 April 1985 | TQ6755453300; 51°15′15″N 0°23′59″E | | 1070656 | Upload Photo | Q26324836 |
| Good Intent Cottage | II | 144, Pizien Well Road | | | 19 April 1985 | TQ6742953098; 51°15′09″N 0°23′52″E | | 1070657 | Upload Photo | Q26324840 |
| Barn 40 Yards North of Red Hill Farmhouse | II | Red Hill | | | 19 April 1985 | TQ6938254408; 51°15′49″N 0°25′35″E | | 1363051 | Upload Photo | Q26644901 |
| Chapel Cottage | II | Red Hill | | | 19 April 1985 | TQ6973554240; 51°15′43″N 0°25′53″E | | 1116296 | Upload Photo | Q26409925 |
| Four Oasts at Home Farm | II | Red Hill | | | 19 April 1985 | TQ6917653553; 51°15′22″N 0°25′23″E | | 1070659 | Upload Photo | Q26324846 |
| Garden Wall to West of Oaken Wood | II | Red Hill | | | 19 April 1985 | TQ6974254187; 51°15′42″N 0°25′53″E | | 1116293 | Upload Photo | Q26409922 |
| Oaken Wood | II | Red Hill | | | 19 April 1985 | TQ6975454185; 51°15′42″N 0°25′54″E | | 1070662 | Upload Photo | Q26324855 |
| Oaken Wood Cottage | II | Red Hill | | | 19 April 1985 | TQ6972554176; 51°15′41″N 0°25′52″E | | 1363050 | Upload Photo | Q26644900 |
| Pelican Farmhouse | II* | Red Hill | | | 1 August 1952 | TQ6924953506; 51°15′20″N 0°25′27″E | | 1320018 | Upload Photo | Q17547075 |
| Phoenix Cottage | II | Red Hill | | | 19 April 1985 | TQ6975554128; 51°15′40″N 0°25′54″E | | 1116284 | Upload Photo | Q26409916 |
| Red Hill Cottage | II | Red Hill | | | 19 April 1985 | TQ6963553939; 51°15′34″N 0°25′47″E | | 1070661 | Upload Photo | Q26324852 |
| Red Hill Farmhouse | II | Red Hill | | | 19 April 1985 | TQ6937254380; 51°15′48″N 0°25′34″E | | 1070663 | Upload Photo | Q26324858 |
| Winwick | II | Red Hill | | | 19 April 1985 | TQ6920253525; 51°15′21″N 0°25′24″E | | 1070660 | Upload Photo | Q26324849 |
| 335, Tonbridge Road | II | 335, Tonbridge Road | | | 19 April 1985 | TQ6853153605; 51°15′24″N 0°24′50″E | | 1320037 | Upload Photo | Q26606079 |
| Church of Saint John the Baptist | II* | Tonbridge Road | church building | | 25 August 1959 | TQ6853353674; 51°15′26″N 0°24′50″E | | 1070664 | Church of Saint John the Baptist More images | Q17546807 |
| Claremont Claremont Cottage | II | Tonbridge Road | | | 19 April 1985 | TQ6915553519; 51°15′21″N 0°25′22″E | | 1116157 | Upload Photo | Q26409808 |
| Crossways Stores | II | 188-190, Tonbridge Road | | | 15 March 1984 | TQ6918253502; 51°15′20″N 0°25′23″E | | 1320073 | Upload Photo | Q26606113 |
| Highbury and Ivy Cottage | II | Tonbridge Road | | | 1 August 1952 | TQ6893853610; 51°15′24″N 0°25′11″E | | 1070666 | Upload Photo | Q26324864 |
| Japonica Cottage | II | Tonbridge Road | | | 19 April 1985 | TQ6897653566; 51°15′22″N 0°25′13″E | | 1320054 | Upload Photo | Q26606095 |
| Six Table Tombs and One Obelisk in Church of Saint of John the Baptist Churchyard | II | Tonbridge Road | | | 12 April 2000 | TQ6854853645; 51°15′25″N 0°24′51″E | | 1380222 | Upload Photo | Q26660435 |
| South Gates and Entrance Wall to Wateringbury Place | II | Tonbridge Road | | | 19 April 1985 | TQ6882553614; 51°15′24″N 0°25′05″E | | 1116230 | Upload Photo | Q26409870 |
| Stables to West of the Lodge | II | Tonbridge Road | | | 19 April 1985 | TQ6878653612; 51°15′24″N 0°25′03″E | | 1116239 | Upload Photo | Q26409879 |
| The Coach House the Wool Shop | II | 194, Tonbridge Road | | | 23 October 1987 | TQ6916953512; 51°15′20″N 0°25′22″E | | 1363047 | Upload Photo | Q26644897 |
| The Limes | II | Tonbridge Road | | | 19 April 1985 | TQ6897253539; 51°15′22″N 0°25′12″E | | 1363053 | Upload Photo | Q26644903 |
| The Lodge | II | Tonbridge Road | | | 19 April 1985 | TQ6880853579; 51°15′23″N 0°25′04″E | | 1363052 | Upload Photo | Q26644902 |
| The Post Office | II | 192, Tonbridge Road | | | 19 April 1985 | TQ6917053505; 51°15′20″N 0°25′23″E | | 1363054 | Upload Photo | Q26644904 |
| The Thatched House | II | Tonbridge Road | | | 1 August 1952 | TQ6859853604; 51°15′24″N 0°24′53″E | | 1070665 | Upload Photo | Q26324861 |
| The Tomb of Sir Oliver Style in the Church of Saint John the Baptist Churchyard | II* | Tonbridge Road | | | 19 April 1985 | TQ6853953645; 51°15′25″N 0°24′50″E | | 1320027 | Upload Photo | Q17547080 |
| The White House | II | Tonbridge Road | | | 1 August 1952 | TQ6910253509; 51°15′20″N 0°25′19″E | | 1070667 | Upload Photo | Q26324867 |

== See also ==
- Grade I listed buildings in Kent
- Grade II* listed buildings in Kent

== Sources ==
- Newman, John (2012) [1969], Kent: West and the Weald, The Buildings of England, New Haven and London: Yale University Press, ISBN 978-0-300-18509-6
