= Wateringbury =

Village in Kent, England

Coordinates: 51.255°N 0.423°E

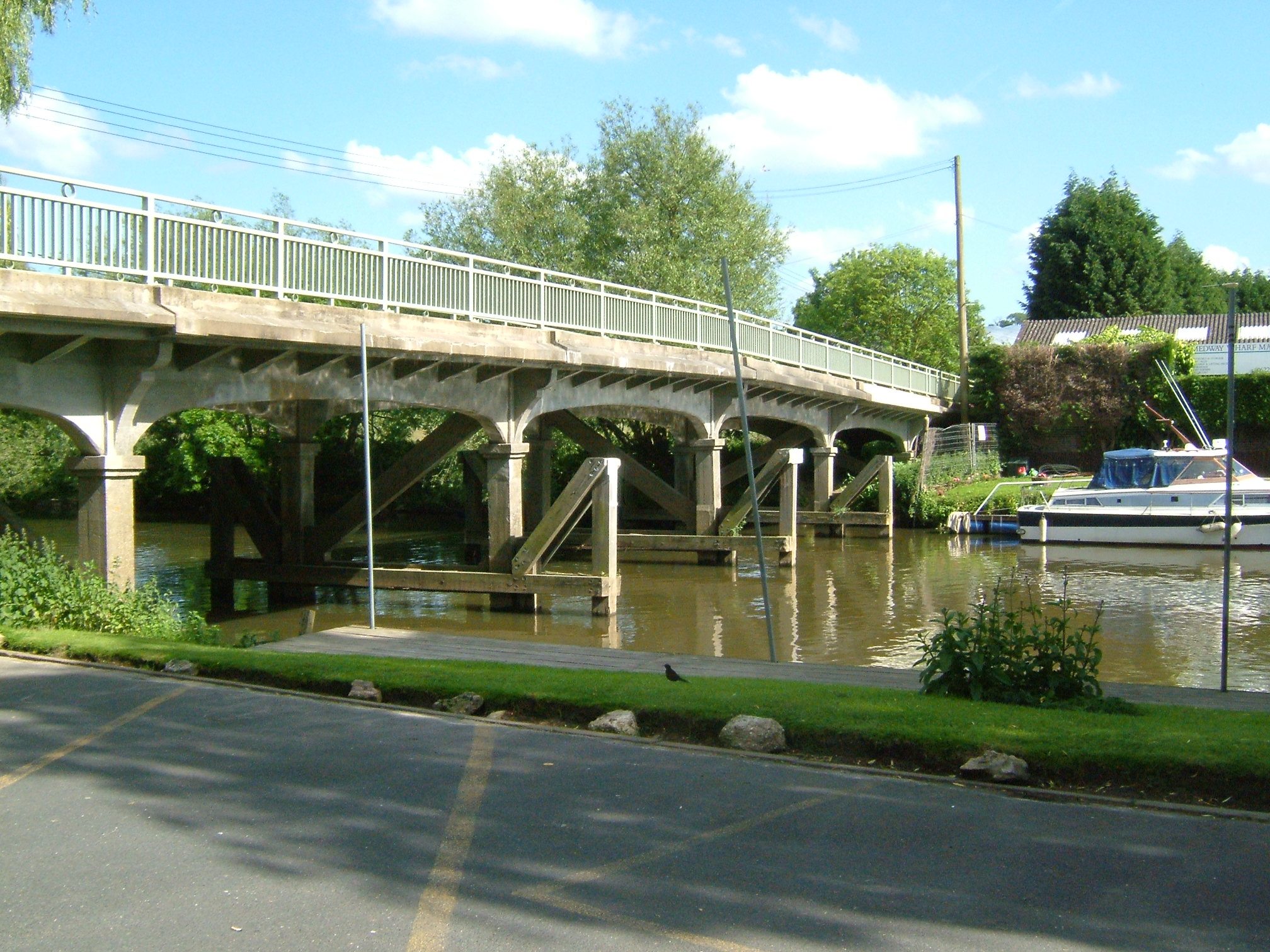
- Bow Bridge, over the River Medway

- Location within Kent
- Population: 2,015 (2001); 2,104 (2011)
- OS grid reference: TQ691528
- District: Tonbridge and Malling
- Shire county: Kent
- Region: South East
- Country: England
- Sovereign state: United Kingdom
- Post town: MAIDSTONE
- Postcode district: ME18
- Dialling code: 01622
- Police: Kent
- Fire: Kent
- Ambulance: South East Coast
- UK Parliament: Tonbridge

Wateringbury is a village and civil parish near the town of Maidstone in Kent, England. The Wateringbury Stream flows into the River Medway just above Bow Bridge. It formerly powered three watermills in the village, one of which survives. The Wateringbury railway station is on the Medway Valley Line.

== History ==
=== Early history ===
The name Wateringbury, like many of the nearby parishes (such as West Malling, Barming, Farleigh), is an Anglo-Saxon name, meaning "The fortification (bury) of the people (ing) of Othere (Water)".

Wateringbury's existence is first documented in the 10th-century will of Bihtric and Aelfswith and in the early 11th-century obligation recorded in the Textus Roffensis to maintain part of Rochester Bridge. The settlement had a detached 'den', used in autumn to feed pigs on acorns and nuts, in the forested Weald of Kent at Lilly Hoo, which remained a part of the parish for secular matters until the 19th century (and for ecclesiastical matters until the 20th century).

In 1066, as recorded by the Domesday Book of 1086, Wateringbury consisted of two manors owned respectively by Leofeva and Godil, both Anglo-Saxon women with land-holdings elsewhere. By 1086, they were replaced by incoming Normans, Ralph son of Thorold and Hugh de Brebouef, both of whom held the manor from Bishop Odo of Bayeux. There were 30 heads of household (including villagers, small-holders and slaves) recorded in the Domesday Book at the two manors, which might imply a total population of about 150 people including children. Three mills were recorded, one which still exists and another which was in existence until the early 20th century.

A Church is also mentioned in the Domesday Book. A stone church dedicated to St. John the Baptist (a popular late Anglo-Saxon dedication) stands in Wateringbury. The chancel and tower of the current church building date from the 13th century. However, the current church is probably on the same site as the Anglo-Saxon church.

=== Medieval Period ===
Adjacent to the church, Wateringbury Place is the largest house in the village and in medieval times the largest estate. It was completely rebuilt in 1707 by the Style family, reputedly 200 yards from a former moated building. The Style family owned Wateringbury Place from the early 17th century to the early 19th (returning in 1945 until 1978); they were made baronets in 1627 and the Style family still holds the title of baronet of Wateringbury. Two houses of medieval origin still exist, the Pelicans, and the Wardens, and several other houses have 16th century origins.

From the two estates of the Domesday Book there developed four medieval manors with their own manor courts: Chart, Canons and Westbury as well as Wateringbury Place. Chart was in the area now called Pizien Well and a mace called the Dumb Borsholder, now hanging in the Church, is associated with this manor. A right to hold a market in Wateringbury was granted in 1311 by royal charter. An 18th-century local antiquarian, Edward Greensted, says the market was probably held in Chart. Canons was owned by the Prior and Canons of Leeds until the Reformation. Westbury was a small manor owned by a family of that name.

=== Modern Period ===
By the late seventeenth century Wateringbury's population had doubled from its Domesday Book level and by the time of the first census in 1801 the population was 817; it continued to grow rapidly in the first half of the 19th century (to 1,448 in 1851) before falling in the second half (to 1,316 in 1901), reflecting the general national trend of urbanisation. Wateringbury was an early mover amongst the immediately surrounding parishes in subsidising emigration in the 1830s to help relieve poverty with financial assistance being given for emigration to Canada in 1832 and to Australia in 1838.

During the 19th and early 20th centuries there were major temporary influxes of hoppers in September of each year. In 1900 the vicar, Greville Livett, estimated that there had been 3,300 such ‘immigrants’ including their children.

Wateringbury benefited from the work in the period 1740 to 1747 of the Medway Navigation Company (MNC) in making the River Medway navigable above Maidstone, and so available for the transport of bulky cargos. The medieval stone bridge was replaced by a wooden one as part of the MNC's mid-18th century navigation improvements, which was in turn replaced in 1914. The Maidstone-Tonbridge turnpike, authorised by Act of Parliament in 1765/6, came through the village. In 1844 the Medway valley railway line gave it an alternative transport link for passengers and cargo.

The tithe survey of 1839 provides a snapshot in time of the village and its economic activity at least as far as agriculture goes. Arable farming covered 26% of the parish and woods, mainly coppiced sweet chestnut, covered 20%. Hops covered 14% and fruit 10%. However, the acreage of hops subsequently expanded and, as a cash crop, it brought wealth to the village, although the annual influx of temporary labour also brought social problems.

Two breweries, the Phoenix Brewery of the Leney family and the Kent Brewery of the Jude and Hanbury families, developed in the village in the 18th century and only closed in the late 20th. In the second half of the 19th century, Leney became internationally renowned as a breeder of shorthorn cattle with individual specimens reaching astronomical prices (2,000 guineas for a single animal in 1874) at auctions held in the village with exports to the US and New Zealand.

In the 1820s Matthias Lucas, Lord Mayor of London in 1827, a self-made man who became wealthy from commerce, acquired Wateringbury Place. During his residence he was active in village affairs, building several substantial houses (The Red House, The Beck, The Thatched House, The Limes and The Orpines) on the Wateringbury Place estate for rent. He also represented the village's interests to Parliamentary inquiries about the navigation of the Medway and the fruit trade. He died in 1848, and his grandson split and sold the estate in 1876.

Another Lord Mayor of London, Horatio Davies, owned Wateringbury Place by 1897, the year of his Lord Mayorship. He was an art lover and a discriminating purchaser of pictures, and filled the house with famous works of art and antique silverware.

In the nineteenth century, Wateringbury is recorded as having several small private boarding schools, and in 1843 a public National School. There was also an increase of sports and other clubs and activities in the nineteenth century. The societies included: an Amicable Benefit Society; the Oddfellows; Boys Brigade and Scouts; horticultural and drama societies. A Working Men's Club was established in 1887 with considerable support from the local gentry. A series of annual rowing regattas held on the Medway in the 1860s and 1870s attracted large numbers of people each year to Wateringbury to view, with special trains laid on; a silver Wateringbury regatta cup is still awarded each year at the National Schools regatta.

=== Twentieth Century ===
The First World War impacted the village, like many others, through 41 deaths representing about 12% of men of military age. The vicar reported that as a result of the shortage of male hop pickers, the children involved were much more rowdy than in previous years. A major fire in 1927 caused 4 deaths at Wateringbury Hall and attracted much national and international attention.

The Second World War saw child evacuees from Woolwich attend school in the village; bombing as a result of the proximity of West Malling airfield; 3 deaths in the village from V1 "Doodle Bugs" (2 military personnel at Wateringbury Place and 1 civilian on Manor Farm); and the housing of prisoners of war in the village.

The second half of the 20th century saw a resurgence of population growth provided for by new housing developments, partly on the sites previously occupied by the two breweries, both of which closed. They had previously been taken over by a national brewer following the trend at the time for consolidation. A notable scheme is the low-rise brick bungalows at "Leasdene" on Upper Mill, completed by Belcher & Clapson architects in 1966.

== Amenities ==
In the 21st century, Wateringbury has a village hall, a primary school the railway station, several pubs and a few shops.

== Heritage ==
Most of the village and Wateringbury Place are a designated Conservation Area. In 2017 a series of blue plaques were installed in the village by the Wateringbury Local History Society; those commemorated include Admiral Sir Henry Ruthven Moore, Dame Ellen Terry, Lena, Lady Login and William Rutter Dawes.

== Demography ==
Wateringbury compared
2001 UK Census	Wateringbury	Tonbridge and Malling district	England
Population	2,015	107,561	49,138,831
Foreign born	3.7%	4.6%	9.2%
White	98.8%	98.3%	90.9%
Asian	0.5%	0.7%	4.6%
Black	0%	0.1%	2.3%
Christian	77.9%	76.1%	71.7%
Muslim	0.2%	0.3%	3.1%
Hindu	0.3%	0.2%	1.1%
No religion	13.6%	15%	14.6%
Unemployed	2%	1.9%	3.3%
Retired	13.9%	14.2%	13.5%

At the 2001 UK census, the Wateringbury electoral ward had a population of 2,015. The ethnicity was 98.8% white, 0.6% mixed race, 0.5% Asian, 0% black and 0.1% other. The place of birth of residents was 96.3% United Kingdom, 0.5% Republic of Ireland, 1% other Western European countries, and 2.2% elsewhere. Religion was recorded as 77.9% Christian, 0.2% Buddhist, 0.3% Hindu, 0.2% Sikh, 0.2% Jewish, and 0.2% Muslim. 13.6% were recorded as having no religion, 0.2% had an alternative religion and 7.5% did not state their religion.

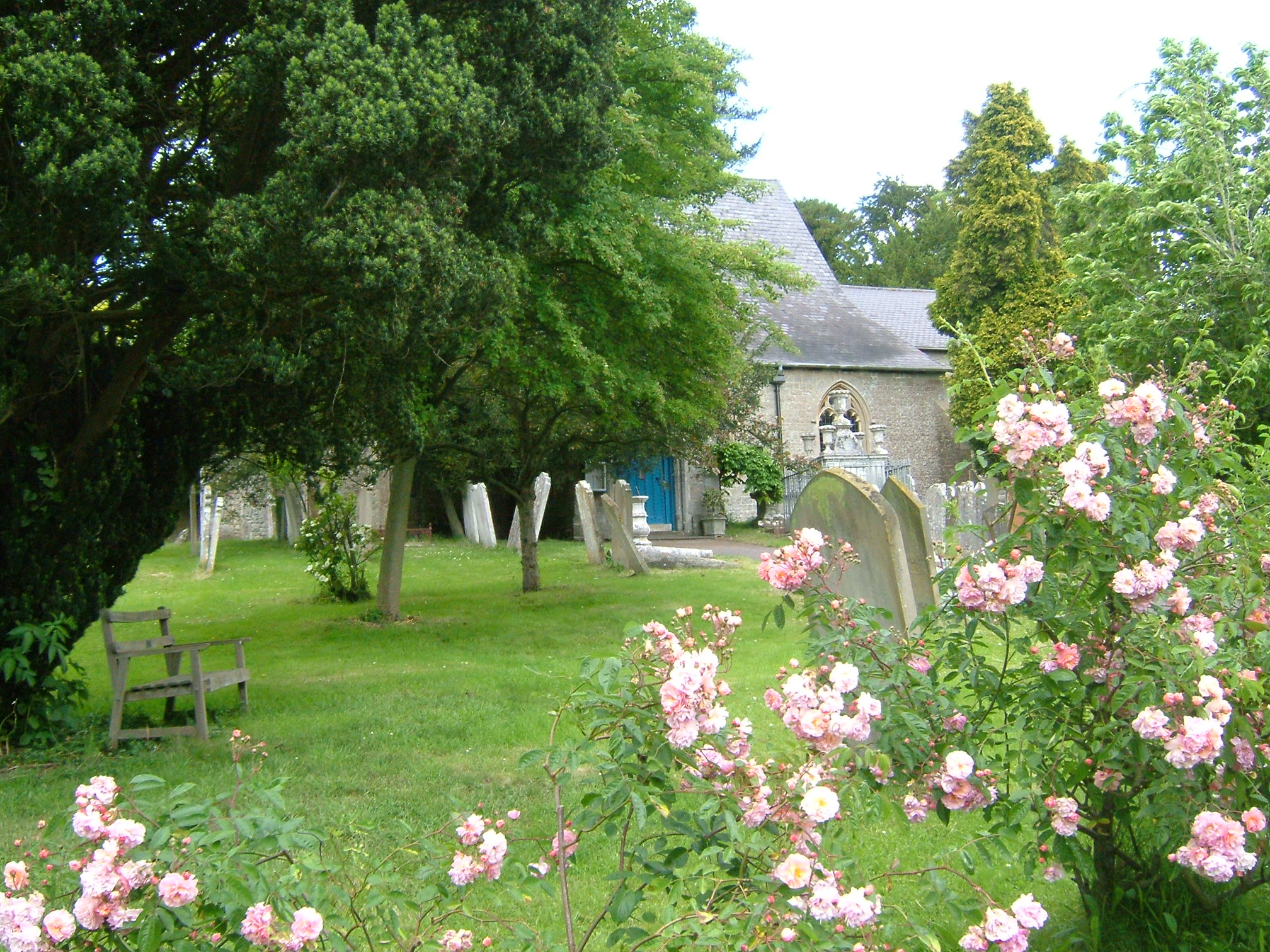
The churchyard of St John the Baptist with a yew, roses, a sundial and monuments

The economic activity of residents aged 16–74 was 43.9% in full-time employment, 12.1% in part-time employment, 10.3% self-employed, 2% unemployed, 2.5% students with jobs, 3.2% students without jobs, 13.9% retired, 7.1% looking after home or family, 2.8% permanently sick or disabled and 2.2% economically inactive for other reasons. The industry of employment of residents was 15.7% retail, 12.1% manufacturing, 7% construction, 15.6% real estate, 11.5% health and social work, 6.4% education, 6.4% transport and communications, 6.6% public administration, 3% hotels and restaurants, 8.5% finance, 1.7% agriculture and 5.5% other. Compared with national figures, the ward had a relatively high proportion of workers in finance, and a relatively low proportion in hotels and restaurants. Of the ward's residents aged 16–74, 23.1% had a higher education qualification or the equivalent, compared with 19.9% nationwide.

== Notable people ==
- Jack Hubble (1881–1965), cricketer, was born in Wateringbury.
- Frederick Leney (1876–1921), cricketer, was born in Wateringbury.
- Stewart Symes (1882–1962), governor of Tanganyika and governor-general of Sudan, was born in Wateringbury.

== See also ==
- Listed buildings in Wateringbury
