= Geoffrey Hallowes =

British espionage agent

Geoffrey MacLeod Hallowes
- Born: 15 April 1918; Kensington, London, England
- Died: 25 September 2006 (aged 88); Walton-on-Thames, Surrey, England
- Burial place: Burvale Cemetery, Hersham, Surrey
- Relatives: Odette Sansom
- Military career
- Allegiance: United Kingdom
- Branch: British Army
- Rank: Captain
- Service number: 132514
- Units: Gordon Highlanders; Special Operations Executive
- Conflicts: World War II
- Awards: Mention in Dispatches; Croix de Guerre with Bronze Palm (France)
- Other work: Director of Twiss, Browning & Hallowes Wine Importers and International Distillers & Vintners

Geoffrey MacLeod Hallowes (15 April 1918 – 25 September 2006) was an officer of the Special Operations Executive (SOE) during the Second World War. He was the third husband of World War II heroine Odette Sansom (née Brailly); they married in 1956.

== Biography ==
Hallowes was born in Kensington, London, the son of Edward Price Hallowes, a partner in Twiss, Browning & Hallowes of London, importers of Dry Monopole champagne, and Aileen Macleod of Adelaide, South Australia. He was educated at the Aldro prep school, Eastbourne, the Lyceum Alpinum Zuoz in Switzerland, and at Jesus College, Cambridge, but left without a degree.

During the Second World War, Hallowes initially served with the 2nd Battalion, the Gordon Highlanders in the defence of Malaya against Japan in 1942. His unit was one of the last to escape into Singapore before the causeway to Malaya was destroyed. When Singapore surrendered on 15 February 1942, Hallowes joined Major "Nick" Nicholson to form one of two pairs of officers who were sent to carry the order to ceasefire to garrisons on the islands of Pulau Blakang Mati and Pulau Brani. They were given permission to try to escape from the Japanese after the order was delivered. They took a boat to the east coast of Sumatra, and walked to Padang, from whence they were rescued by Royal Navy destroyer which called in to refuel after the Battle of the Java Sea. They were shipped to Ceylon, and then flown to India.

Hallowes became a staff captain in Bombay in May 1942, but volunteered to join SOE. He joined a special forces training school in Haifa, and became a member of SOE's Force 133, in Cairo, earmarked for assignments in Yugoslavia. Before long, he was reassigned to Peterborough to join an SOE "Jedburgh" team. 94 of these three-member teams, with one British or American officer, one French officer and a radio operator, were parachuted into France after D-Day, to assist the French Resistance with sabotage. Hallowes led his team, code-named "Jeremy", with French Lieutenant Henri Charles Giese and radio operator Sergeant Roger Leney.

He and his team travelled via Algiers to arrive in the south of France on 24 August 1944, where they were met by American SOE operative Virginia Hall. Hallowes and Giese travelled to Le Puy, the local Gaullist headquarters. He assisted the Free French forces by arranging a drop of arms, assisting them to liberate French villages, and encouraging them to prevent the Germans from withdrawing across the Rhône. He received a Croix de Guerre for his activities in France.

Back in Britain in September 1944, Hallowes joined SOE's Special Planning Unit 22, to consider the feasibility of sending German-speaking SOE operatives (particularly Poles and former German prisoners of war) into German territory. He took charge of the prisoner of war elements, which gained useful intelligence of the Germans before the war ended, and of Soviet forces afterwards. He was mentioned in dispatches in 1945.

== Post-Second World War ==
After the war, Hallowes returned to Britain and joined the family wine importing company. He was co-founding director of the International Distillers & Vintners in 1962, and the first chairman of the newly created IDV Europe in 1972.

== Death ==
He retired from the board of IDV in 1983, and died in 2006, aged 88.

In March 2008 a cache of arms was discovered during a house-clearance in a property in Walton-on-Thames. The weapons – an American M1 carbine, German MP 40 submachine gun, British .38 Enfield No. 2 revolver, and American .45 Ithaca M1911A1, .32 Colt Model 1903 Pocket Hammerless and German 9 mm Navy Model Luger pistols – were identified at the Imperial War Museum as belonging to Hallowes, before being donated to the Gordon Highlanders Museum in Aberdeen.
