= Herbert Leney =

English cricketer

Personal information
- Full name: Herbert Leney
- Born: 8 September 1850; Wateringbury, Kent
- Died: 18 November 1915 (aged 65); West Farleigh, Kent
- Batting: Right-handed
- Bowling: Right-arm roundarm fast
- Relatives: Frederick Leney (nephew)

Domestic team information
- Years: Team
- 1873–1877: Kent

Career statistics
Competition	First-class
Matches	4
Runs scored	58
Batting average	11.60
100s/50s	0/0
Top score	33
Balls bowled	12
Wickets	0
Bowling average	–
5 wickets in innings	–
10 wickets in match	–
Best bowling	–
Catches/stumpings	0/–
- Source: Cricinfo, 9 April 2012

Herbert Leney (8 September 1850 – 18 November 1915) was an English amateur cricketer who played in four first-class cricket matches for Kent County Cricket Club between 1871 and 1878.

Leney was born at Wateringbury near Maidstone in Kent in 1850. He made his first-class debut for Kent against WG Grace's XI in 1873 at Gravesend. He died at Smith's Hall at West Farleigh in Kent in November 1915 aged 65. His nephew, Frederick Leney, also played first-class cricket.

== Bibliography ==
- Carlaw, Derek (2020). Kent County Cricketers, A to Z: Part One (1806–1914) (PDF). Cardiff: ACS.
