= Edwin Leaney =

English cricketer

Personal information
- Full name: Edwin Leaney
- Born: 3 June 1860; Woolwich, Kent
- Died: 1 September 1904 (aged 44); Greenwich, London
- Batting: Right-handed
- Role: Wicket-keeper
- Relatives: Joseph Leaney (brother)

Domestic team information
- Years: Team
- 1892: Kent
- Source: Cricinfo, 27 January 2019

Edwin Leaney (3 June 1860 – 1 September 1904) was an English professional cricketer.

Leaney was born at Woolwich in what was then Kent in 1860. He played six first-class cricket matches as a wicket-keeper for Kent County Cricket Club in 1892 and toured South Africa with Walter Reed's XI in 1891–92, although he did not play in the match against South Africa which was given retrospective Test match status. He played for Old Charlton Cricket Club and his Wisden obituary says that he "was well-known in Metropolitan Club cricket".

Leaney played reserve team football as a goalkeeper in the 1890–91 season for Royal Arsenal F.C., the amateur team which evolved into Woolwich Arsenal F.C. in 1893. He died at the Dreadnought Seamen's Hospital in Greenwich in 1904 after undergoing an operation. He was 44.

== Bibliography ==
- Carlaw, Derek (2020). Kent County Cricketers, A to Z: Part One (1806–1914) (PDF). Cardiff: ACS.
