= Roger Leney =

- Born: 4 May 1923
- Died: 4 May 2008 (aged 85)
- Military career
- Allegiance: United Kingdom
- Branch: British Army
- Rank: Sergeant
- Unit: Special Operations Executive
- Conflicts: Second World War: European theatre; Western Front; Burma campaign
- Awards: Military Medal; Mentioned in Despatches; Croix de Guerre (France)

Roger Anthony Leney MM (4 May 1923 – 4 May 2008) was a British radio operator with the Royal Armoured Corps during the Second World War.

== Second World War ==
After finishing Special Operations Executive (SOE) signals training school in September 1943, he was part of a three-man team parachuted into occupied France in June 1944. The mission was primarily to establish contact with and provide weaponry to the French Resistance via airdrop. Leney (codenamed "Jeremy") was the radio operator of his team, whose other members were the English-speaking Captain Geoffrey Hallowes and the French-speaking Lieutenant Henri Charles Giese. The team landed in Haute Loire after dark on the night of 24 August 1944. The teams were known as "Jedburghs".

On arrival, they were to operate under the instructions of an SOE member codenamed "Diane", an American woman who had lost part of her left leg in a non-war related shooting accident, hence known locally as "La dame qui boite" ("the woman who limps"). This was actually Virginia Hall, who encountered Leney's team near her base at Le Chambon-sur-Lignon. He remained with her to make radio contact with SOE headquarters, while Hallowes and Giese sought out local resistance fighters. Leney established successful radio contact with SOE/HQ and some thirty (30) containers of arms were dropped to equip the FFI to engage detachments of withdrawing German troops.

=== Burma ===
His previous mission in France having ended in September 1944, Leney was parachuted into Burma on 15 March 1945 with a team from Force 136, an arm of SOE operating in South East Asia. He again was radio operator for a group training locals (Karen guerrillas) who were deployed to assist General Slim's 14th Army in preventing the escape of the Japanese 28th Army into Thailand. The operation, codenamed "Character", was also successful.

=== Awards ===
Leney was awarded the Military Medal for his service in Burma. He was mentioned in dispatches. In 1946 he received the Croix de Guerre with Silver Star for his work in occupied France.

== Family ==
Roger Leney died on his 85th birthday in 2008, and was survived by his wife (since 1950), the former Shirley Rollett, and their four children.
