= Frederick Leney =

English cricketer (1876–1921)

Frederick Barcham Leney (29 November 1876 – 25 July 1921) was an English brewery executive and amateur cricketer who played one first-class cricket match for Kent County Cricket Club in 1905.

Leney was born at Wateringbury near Maidstone in Kent in 1876 and was educated at Bradfield College where he was in the school cricket and association football teams. He played for Kent's Second XI between 1903 and 1906 and played club cricket for Wateringbury Cricket Club, which he captained, The Mote and for Marylebone Cricket Club (MCC). He made his only Kent First XI appearance in 1905 against Oxford University.

Leney's father Augustus had established the Phoenix Brewery at Wateringbury in 1843 and Frederick, the eldest son, went into the family business after leaving school, becoming a Director by 1911. At the outbreak of World War I he joined the British Red Cross as a Red Cross Searcher. He served with the organisation in France and Egypt until December 1916 when he was discharged and returned to run the brewery, his father having died in a hunting accident the previous year.

Leney died suddenly at the Railway Hotel in Galway in July 1921 aged 44. His uncle, Herbert, played four first-class matches for Kent. The family business, which had been renamed Frederick Leney & Sons in 1896, was taken over by Whitbread in 1927 and then by Fremlin's Brewery in the 1960s. It operated until 1981, although the site has since been used as a distribution depot for Whitbread.

== Bibliography ==
- Carlaw, Derek (2020). Kent County Cricketers, A to Z: Part One (1806–1914) (PDF). Cardiff: ACS.
