= 41 Geo. 3 =

41 Geo. 3 can refer to either:

- 41 Geo. 3. (G.B.), a citation used for acts of the Parliament of Great Britain in the year 1800.
- 41 Geo. 3. (U.K.), a citation used for acts of the Parliament of the United Kingdom in the year 1801.
