= Joseph Leaney =

English cricket umpire

Personal information
- Born: 11 January 1852; Woolwich, Kent
- Relatives: Edwin Leaney (brother)

Umpiring information
- Tests umpired: 1 (1892)
- Source: Cricinfo, 7 June 2019

Joseph Leaney (born 11 January 1852, date of death unknown) was an English cricket umpire. He officiated in one Test match, South Africa vs. England, in 1892. His brother, Edwin, played first-class cricket for Kent County Cricket Club in 1892.

== See also ==
- List of Test cricket umpires
