= Medway Navigation =

The River Medway in England flows for 70 miles (113 km) from Turners Hill, in West Sussex, through Tonbridge, Maidstone and the Medway Towns conurbation in Kent, to the River Thames at Sheerness, where it shares the latter's estuary. The Medway Navigation runs from the Leigh Barrier south of Tonbridge to Allington just north of Maidstone. It is 19 miles (31 km) in length. The Environment Agency is the navigation authority responsible for the navigation.

== The route ==
Until 1746 the river was impassable above Maidstone. To that point each village on the river had its wharf or wharves: at Halling, Snodland, New Hythe and Aylesford. Cargoes included corn, fodder, fruit, stone and timber.

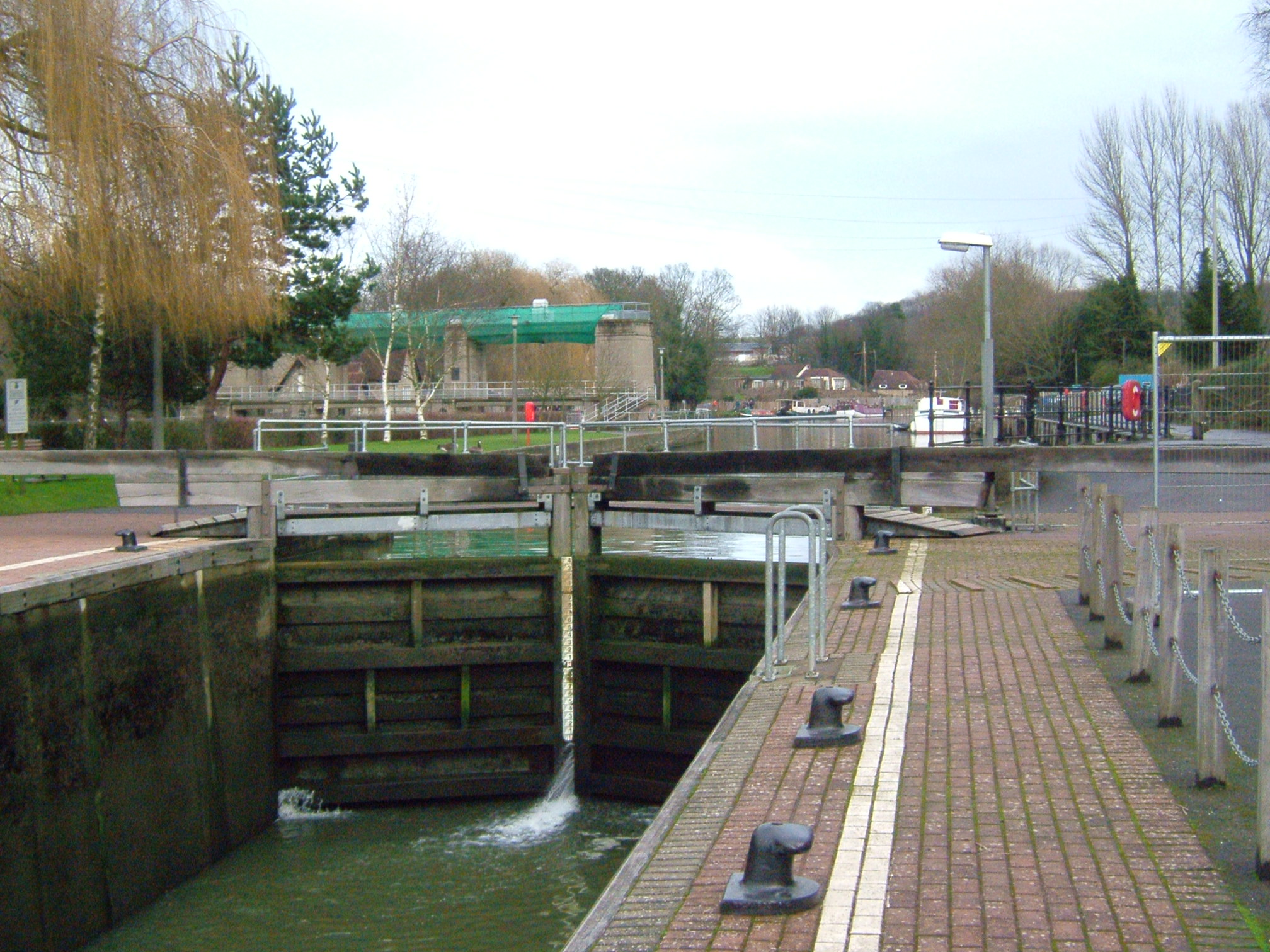
Allington Lock and Sluice, it is at this point that the river becomes tidal.

In 1746 improvements to the channel meant that barges of 40 long tons (41 t) could reach East Farleigh, Yalding and even Tonbridge. The channel was further improved to Leigh in 1828. There are eleven locks on the river. The lowest, opened in 1792, is at Allington, and is the extent of tides. The others are East Farleigh, Teston, Hampstead Lane, Stoneham Old Lock (disused), Sluice Weir Lock, Oak Wier Lock East Lock, Porter's, Eldridge's and Town Lock in Tonbridge (see table). The locks will take craft up to 80 feet (24 m) by 18 feet (5.5 m), and vessels with a draft of 4 feet (1.2 m) can navigate the river. The shallowest point is just below Sluice Weir Lock which is prone to silting after heavy rain. The draughts along the navigation are: Tonbridge to Yalding 4 feet; Yalding to Maidstone 5 feet 6 inches; Maidstone to Allington Lock 6 feet 6 inches. Headroom is 8 feet 6 inches below Tonbridge. College Lock, in Maidstone, was removed in 1899. Stoneham Old Lock was dismantled in 1915 as part of a reconstruction of that section of the waterway.

The locks on the navigation are as follows.

Locks on the Medway Navigation
Lock name	Change in level	Distance
Allington Lock	12’ 6” (3.81 m)	0
East Farleigh Lock	5’ 3” (1.60 m)	7.2 km (4.5 mi)
Teston Lock	6’ 3” (1.90 m)	10.4 km (6.5 mi)
Hampstead Lane Lock	9’ 3” (2.82 m)	15.28 km (9.49 mi)
Stoneham Old Lock	Demolished	17.7 km (11.0 mi)
Sluice Weir Lock	9’ 0” (2.74 m)	18.8 km (11.7 mi)
Oak Weir Lock	6’ 3” (1.90 m)	20.8 km (12.9 mi)
East Lock	6’ 0” (1.82 m)	22.0 km (13.7 mi)
Porter’s Lock	4’ 3” (1.30 m)	24.0 km (14.9 mi)
Eldrige’s Lock	5’ 3” (1.60 m)	25.6 km (15.9 mi)
(Tonbridge) Town Lock	5’ 2” (1.57 m)	28 km (17 mi)

== See also ==
- Canals of the United Kingdom
- History of the British canal system
- River Medway
