= Civil List Act =

Civil List Act may refer to

- Civil List Act 1697, an Act of the Parliament of England
- Civil List Act 1727, an Act of the Parliament of Great Britain
- Civil List Act 1760, an Act of the Parliament of Great Britain
- Civil List Act 1837, an Act of the Parliament of the United Kingdom
- Civil List Act 1979, an Act of the Parliament of New Zealand
- Civil List and Secret Service Money Act 1782, an Act of the Parliament of Great Britain
