= Crown land =

Territory belonging to a monarch

Crown land, also known as royal domain, is a territorial area belonging to the monarch, who personifies the Crown. It is the equivalent of an entailed estate and passes with the monarchy, being inseparable from it. Today, in Commonwealth realms, Crown land is considered public land and is not part of the monarch's private estate.

== Australia ==
In Australia, public lands without a specific tenure (e.g. national park or state forest) are referred to as 'Crown land' or 'state land', which is described as being held in the "right of the Crown" by either an individual state or the Commonwealth of Australia (as Australia is a federation, there is no single "Crown" as a legal entity). Most Crown lands in Australia are held by the Crown in the right of a state. The only land held by the Commonwealth consists of land in the Northern Territory (surrendered by South Australia), the Australian Capital Territory, Jervis Bay Territory, and small areas acquired for airports, defence and other government purposes.

Each jurisdiction has its own policies towards the sale and use of Crown lands within the state. For example, New South Wales, where over half of all land is Crown land, passed a controversial reform in 2005 requiring Crown lands to be rated at market value. Crown lands include land set aside for various government or public purposes, development, town planning, as well as vacant land. Crown lands comprise around 23% of Australian land, of which the largest single category is vacant land, comprising 12.5% of the land.

Crown land is used for such things as airports, military grounds (Commonwealth), public utilities (usually state), or is sometimes unallocated and reserved for future development.

In Tasmania, Crown land is managed under the Crown Lands Act 1976. In Queensland, unallocated state land is managed under the Land Act 1994. In South Australia, the relevant act is the Crown Land Management Act 2009. In Victoria, it is the Crown Land (Reserves) Act 1978 and the Land Act 1958.

== Austria ==
From the late 18th century onwards, the territories acquired by the Austrian Habsburg monarchy were called crown lands (German: Kronländer). Initially ruled in personal union by the House of Habsburg-Lorraine, they played a vital role as constituent lands of the Habsburg nation-building and were ultimately reorganised as administrative divisions of the centralised Austrian Empire established in 1804. During the restoration period after the Revolutions of 1848, the Austrian crown lands were ruled by Statthalter governors directly subordinate to the Emperor according to the 1849 March Constitution.

By the 1861 February Patent, proclaimed by Emperor Franz Joseph I, the Austrian crown lands received a certain autonomy. The traditional Landstände (estates) assemblies were elevated to Landtage legislatures, partly elected according to the principle of census suffrage.

After the Austro-Hungarian Compromise of 1867, the Kingdom of Hungary (with the Principality of Transylvania), the Kingdom of Croatia-Slavonia and Fiume became constituent parts of the Lands of the Crown of Saint Stephen (Transleithania); ruled in real union with the remaining Austrian crown lands (officially: "The Kingdoms and Lands represented in the Imperial Council") of Cisleithania until the disintegration of the dual monarchy in 1918.

== Bohemia ==
The medieval European state of the Crown of Bohemia, which was an electorate of the Holy Roman Empire, consisted of crown lands: the Kingdom of Bohemia, the Margraviate of Moravia, the Duchies of Silesia, Upper and Lower Lusatia.

== Barbados ==
When it was a Commonwealth realm, in Barbados, the term Crown land extended to all land that is under the control or ownership of the Crown (the government). This could also pertain to land seized by the government, (either through eminent domain or due to criminal activity), or toward lands with backed taxes. The term 'Crown lands' had been used in relation to government owned farms, beaches, and other land areas also maintained by the National Housing Corporation. The government did not allow private ownership of Barbados' 97 kilometres (60 mi) of coastal beaches in the country, and all areas below the high-tide watermark in the country were considered specifically as "Crown land".

After 30 November 2021, Barbados had transitioned to a republic, replacing the Monarchy of Barbados with a president as head of state. This caused all Crown lands to become state lands instead. Effectively in practice, however, functions of state lands remained the same as Crown lands.

== Canada ==
Within Canada, Crown land is a designated territorial area belonging to the Canadian Crown. Though the monarch owns all Crown land in the country, it is divided in parallel with the "division" of the Crown among the federal and provincial jurisdictions, so that some lands within the provinces are administered by the relevant provincial Crown, whereas others are under the federal Crown. About 82% of Canada's land area (8,886,356 km^{2} or 3,431,041 sq mi) is Crown land: 6% is federal crown land and 76% is provincial crown land. The remaining 6% is indigenous owned, and 12% is under private ownership. Most federal Crown land is in the territories (Northwest Territories, Nunavut, and Yukon) and is administered by Indigenous and Northern Affairs Canada. Only 4% of land in the provinces is federally controlled, largely in the form of national parks, Indian reserves, or Canadian Forces bases. In contrast, provinces hold much of their territory as provincial Crown land, which may be held as provincial parks or wilderness.

Crown land is the equivalent of an entailed estate that passes with the monarchy and cannot be alienated from it; thus, per constitutional convention, these lands cannot be unilaterally sold by the monarch, instead passing on to the next king or queen unless the sovereign is advised otherwise by the relevant ministers of the Crown. Crown land provides the country and the provinces with the majority of their profits from natural resources, largely but not exclusively provincial, rented for logging and mineral exploration rights; revenues flow to the relevant government and may constitute a major income stream, such as in Alberta. Crown land may also be rented by individuals wishing to build homes or cottages.

=== Alberta ===
In the province of Alberta, Crown land, also called public land, is territory registered in the name of "His Majesty the King in right of Alberta as Represented by [specific Minister of the Crown]" and remains under the administration of the mentioned minister until the land is sold or transferred via legislation, such as an order in council. Crown land is governed by the Public Lands Act, originally passed as the Provincial Lands Act in 1931 and renamed in 1949.

=== British Columbia ===
94% of the land in British Columbia is provincial Crown land, 2% of which is covered by fresh water. Federal Crown land makes up a further 1% of the province, including Indian reserves, defence lands and federal harbours, while 5% is privately owned. The Ministry of Forests, Lands and Natural Resource Operations issues Crown land tenures and sells Crown land on behalf of the Crown in Right of British Columbia.

=== Saskatchewan ===
Approximately 65% of Saskatchewan's land is Crown land.

=== Newfoundland and Labrador ===
95% of Newfoundland and Labrador is provincial Crown land.

=== New Brunswick ===
Currently, 48% of New Brunswick's territory is Crown land, used for such things as for conservation projects, resource exploitation, and recreation activities. However, through treaties between First Nations and the Crown in Right of Canada, the provincial Crown grants or denies long-term use of Crown lands by aboriginals, as per the treaties.

=== Nova Scotia ===
As of October 2013, of the 5.3 million hectares (13 million acres) of land in Nova Scotia, approximately 1.53 million hectares (3.8 million acres or about 29% of the province) is designated as Crown land. Crown land is owned by the province and managed by the Department of Natural Resources on behalf of the citizens of Nova Scotia. It is a collective asset which belongs to all Nova Scotians. Many acres of Crown land are licensed for a variety of economic purposes to help build and maintain the prosperity of the province. These purposes range from licenses and leases for cranberry bogs, forestry operations, peat bogs, power lines, wind energy, to broadband towers, and tidal energy. In addition, most of the submerged lands (the sea bed) along the province's 9,000 kilometres (5,600 mi) of coastline are also considered Crown land. Exceptions would include federally and privately owned waterlots. The province owns other land across Nova Scotia, including wilderness areas, protected areas, highways, roads, and provincial buildings. These parcels and structures are managed and administered by other departments and are not considered Crown land.

=== Manitoba ===
By the Crown Lands Act, the Lieutenant Governor-in-Council alone has the ability to augment or disperse Crown land and to determine the price of any Crown land being bought or leased. Crown land is used for varying purposes, including agriculture, wind farming, and cottages, while other areas are set aside for research, environmental protection, public recreation, and resource management. Approximately 95% of the province's forests sit within provincial Crown land.

=== Ontario ===
87% of the province is Crown land, of which 95% is in northern Ontario. It is managed by the Ministry of Natural Resources and Forestry and is used for economic development, tourism and recreation.

=== Prince Edward Island ===
88% of the land on Prince Edward Island (PEI) is privately held, leaving 12% of the land as public, or Crown, land. It is the province with the smallest percentage of Crown land, and it is managed by the Ministry of Environment, Energy, and Climate Action. Usage of these lands is for non-economic purposes such as hunting, fishing, trapping, foraging, hiking and bird watching.

=== Quebec ===
More than 92% of Quebec's territory is Crown land. This heritage and the natural resources that it contains are developed to contribute to the socioeconomic development of all regions of Quebec. Public land is used for a variety of purposes: forestry, mineral, energy, and wildlife resources; developing natural spaces, including parks for recreation and conservation, ecological preserves, and wildlife refuges and habitats; developing infrastructure for industrial and public utilities purposes as well as for leisure and vacation purposes.

== France ==
The crown lands, crown estate, or royal domain (domaine royal) of France refers to the lands and fiefs directly possessed by the kings of France. Before the reign of Henry IV, the royal domain did not encompass the entirety of the territory of the kingdom of France and for much of the Middle Ages significant portions of the kingdom were direct possessions of other feudal lords.

In the 10th and 11th centuries, the first Capetians—while being rulers of France—were among the least powerful of the great feudal lords of France in terms of territory possessed. Patiently, through the use of feudal law (and, in particular, the confiscation of fiefs from rebellious vassals), skillful marriages with female inheritors of large fiefs, and even by purchase, the kings of France were able to increase the royal domain, which, by the 16th century, began to coincide with the entire kingdom. However, the medieval system of appanage (a concession of a fief by the sovereign to his younger sons and their sons after them, although they could be reincorporated if the last lord had no male heirs) alienated large territories from the royal domain and created dangerous rival territories (especially the Duchy of Burgundy in the 14th and 15th centuries).

== Hawaii ==
Prior to the overthrow of the Hawaiian monarchy, the Hawaiian monarchs had access to 1.8 million acres (7,300 km^{2}), the private lands of Kamehameha III which he set aside for the dignity of the royal office for the ruler of the Hawaiian monarchy on 8 March 1848 during the Great Mahele. Kamehameha III and his successors made these lands their private property, selling, leasing or mortgaging at their enjoyment. At the death of Kamehameha IV, it was decided by the Kingdom's Supreme Court that under the above-mentioned instrument executed by Kamehameha III, reserving the Crown Lands, and under the confirmatory act of 7 June 1848, "the inheritance is limited to the successors to the throne", "the wearers of the crown which the conqueror had won," and that at the same time "each successive possessor may regulate and dispose of the same according to his will and pleasure as private property, in like manner as was done by Kamehameha III." Afterwards an act was passed 3 January 1865, "relieve the Royal Domain from encumbrances and to render the same inalienable." This act provided for the redemption of the mortgages on the estate, and enacted that the remaining lands are to be "henceforth inalienable and shall descend to the heirs and successors of the Hawaiian Crown forever," and that "it shall not be lawful hereafter to lease said lands for any terms of years to exceed thirty." The Board of Commissioners of Crown Lands shall consist of three persons to be appointed by His Majesty the King, two of whom shall be appointed from among the members of His Cabinet Council, and serve without remuneration, and the other shall act as Land Agent, and shall be paid out of the revenues of the said lands, such sum as may be agreed to by the King."

The lands were held by Queen Lili'uokalani before 17 January 1893. On this date, the monarchy was overthrown. The crown lands were taken in charge by the provisional and republican governments. When the Republic of Hawaii joined the United States in 1898, the territorial government took ownership. In 1910, Liliuokalani, the former Queen, unsuccessfully attempted to sue the United States for the loss of the Hawaiian Crown Lands.

In March 2009, the U.S. Supreme Court issued a unanimous opinion in Hawaii v. Office of Hawaiian Affairs, reversing the Hawaii Supreme Court's holding that the federally enacted Apology Resolution of 1993 bars the State of Hawaii from selling to third parties any land held in public trust until the claims of Native Hawaiians to the lands have been resolved. The Court first held that it had jurisdiction to review the Hawaii Supreme Court's opinion because it rested on the Apology Resolution. It then found the Hawaii Supreme Court's interpretation of the Apology Resolution to be erroneous, and held that federal law does not bar the State from selling land held in public trust. Accordingly, it remanded the case to the Hawaii Supreme Court to determine if Hawaiian law alone supports the same outcome.

== Hong Kong ==
All "Crown leases" in the former British crown colony became "government leases" on 1 July 1997 upon the change of status of the territory.

== Poland and Lithuania ==
=== Legal condition ===
In Polish–Lithuanian Commonwealth crown lands were known as królewszczyzny which translates to regality or royal land.

In the Kingdom of Poland under the rules of Piast then Jagiellonian dynasties the institution of crown lands was similar to those in Great Britain or Austria-Hungary: the lands were the property of the monarch or dynasty. Beginning in 15th century the properties were often leased, gifted or hocked to the members of the nobility. Those nobles who had received the privilege of administering the crown lands (and thus keeping most of its profits) had the title of Starosta. Once given a crown land, one had the right to keep it "for life". Families of Starostas often wanted to unlawfully keep the royal properties, and that led to common abuses of law.

After the end of Kingdom in Poland the era of new political system called "Republic of szlachta (nobility)" started in late 16th century already in Polish–Lithuanian Commonwealth. As a result of reform and the introduction of the royal election of Polish kings, the royal lands became "public property or state property".

Formally "royal lands" formed about 15–20% of Poland (later, the Polish–Lithuanian Commonwealth), and were divided into two parts:

- the royal table estates (dobra stołowe or ekonomie), which were provided money for king's personal treasure and expenses, among them the support of the army (wojsko kwarciane)
- the rest, which the king was obliged to lease to the outstanding members of the nobility.

Among the largest Crown lands in the 16th and 17th centuries were the territories of Malbork and Wielkorządy with Niepołomice, Sambor in the Crown of the Polish Kingdom.

Monarch's economies in, as it was called, "Republic" of Lithuania (Grand Duchy of Lithuania) were: biggest Šiauliai economy, Alytus economy, also economies in Grodno and Mohylew.

The legal conditions of peasants were better in the Crown lands than on the hereditary estates of the nobility, as there were fewer serfdom obligations.

=== Conditions in the Crown ===
Mostly due to lack of constant dynasty in Poland (see: Royal elections in Poland), royal lands were under notorious, often illegal, control of powerful local magnates, sometimes even semi-independent from the state.

Ruch egzekucyjny (execution movement) of the late 16th century, led by Lord Grand Chancellor of the Crown Jan Zamoyski (against the interests of his own family), put as one of its goals the "execution of lands", i.e. return of all crown lands, which were often illegally held by next generations of Starostine families. In 1562–1563 they forced most of the crown land in the Crown of the Polish Kingdom to be returned to the monarch, however later the whole cycle repeated. In the following centuries Ruch egzekucyjny (lit. execution movement) and subsequently elected Kings were gradually weakened because szlachta achieved more and more privileges – the "Golden" Liberty.

Eventually the nobility controlled most of the crown lands. People without a formal title of nobility inherited or granted were not allowed to be infeudated with regalities.

After the First Partition of Poland crown lands were reformed in 1775, lessening the abuses of the nobility, and the Great Sejm of 1788–1792 decided to put them on sale, to raise funds for reforms and modernisation of the army.

After the following partitions of Poland in 1795 the "royal lands" were directly annexed by the partitioning powers.

=== Situation in Lithuania ===
In the Great Duchy of Lithuania political nation did not follow experience of neighbouring Poland. Lithuanian magnates retained such lands in their hands.

== Spain ==
Historically, the kings of Spain have possessed vast lands, palaces, castles and other buildings, however, at present all those properties are owned by the State. The Crown lands are administered by an independent institution called Patrimonio Nacional, which is responsible for the maintenance of these properties that are always available to the King or Queen of Spain.

== United Kingdom and its predecessor states ==
Historically, the properties now known as the Crown Estate were administered as possessions of the reigning monarch to help fund the business of governing the country and funding their personal household. By the Civil List Act 1760, George III surrendered control over the estate's revenues to the Treasury, in order to relieve him from paying for the costs of the civil service, and judges' and ambassadors' salaries and pensions, and, in return, to receive an annual grant known as the civil list, intended to cover the costs of the Royal Household.

== Vietnam ==
The Domain of the Crown (Vietnamese: Hoàng triều Cương thổ ( 皇朝疆土); French: Domaine de la Couronne) was originally the Nguyễn dynasty's geopolitical concept for its protectorates and principalities where the Kinh ethnic group did not make up the majority. Later it became a type of administrative unit of the State of Vietnam. It was officially established on 15 April 1950 and dissolved on 11 March 1955. In the areas of the Domain of the Crown, Chief of State Bảo Đại was still officially (and legally) titled as the "Emperor of the Nguyễn dynasty".

== See also ==
- Air rights
- Countryside and Rights of Way Act 2000 (in the UK)
- Crown colony
- Crown copyright
- Easement ("the right of use over the real property of another")
- Freedom to roam
- Indigenous land rights
- Land law
- Prior-appropriation water rights
- Riparian water rights
- Treaty rights
