= Finances of the British royal family =

UK monarchy's income and spending

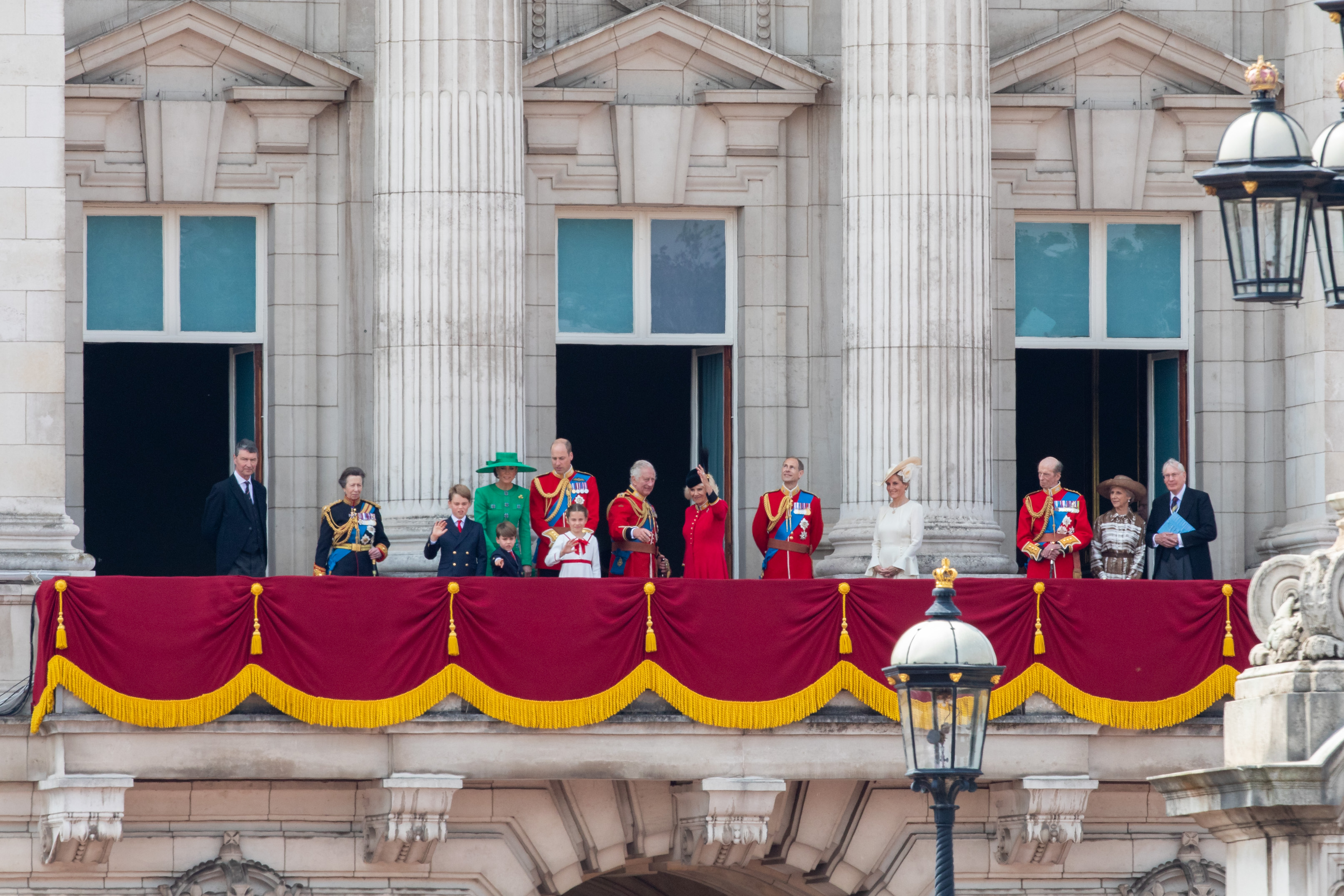
The British royal family on the balcony of Buckingham Palace after the annual Trooping the Colour ceremony in 2023

The finances of the British royal family come from a number of sources. The monarch and some of his family are supported financially by means of the Sovereign Grant, which comes from the government and is calculated as a percentage of profits from the Crown Estate, and which is intended to meet the costs of the sovereign's official expenditures. This includes the costs of the upkeep of the various royal residences, staffing, travel and state visits, public engagements, and official entertainment. Other sources of income include revenues from the duchies of Lancaster and Cornwall, income from assets of other trusts, income from private investments, and a parliamentary annuity.

The Keeper of the Privy Purse is Head of the Privy Purse and Treasurer's Office and has overall responsibility for the management of the sovereign's financial affairs.

== Sovereign Grant ==
The Sovereign Grant is an annual payment made by the Treasury to the monarch to support official duties. It replaced the previous system of financing the Royal Household through a combination of civil list payments and grants-in-aid. The amount of the Sovereign Grant is linked to the profits generated by the Crown Estate which are passed to the Treasury. The annual value of the Sovereign Grant rises with the Crown Estate profits, but it cannot decrease if Crown Estate revenues fall.

The Sovereign Grant Annual Report states that the Sovereign Grant was £31 million for 2012–13, £36.1 million for 2013–14 and £37.9 million for 2014–15. The amount of the Sovereign Grant is equal to 15% of the income account net surplus of the Crown Estate for the financial year that began two years previously. Step 4 of subsection 6(1), and subsection 6(4), of the Act provide a mechanism to prevent the amount of the Sovereign Grant increasing beyond what is necessary because of the growth in Crown Estate revenue. Under the Sovereign Grant the National Audit Office is able to audit the Royal Household.

On 18 November 2016, a plan was announced to increase the Sovereign Grant from 15% to 25% to renovate and repair Buckingham Palace. The percentage is set to revert to 15% when the project is finished in 2027. As a result, the Sovereign Grant amounted to £76.1 million for 2017–18, which included a dedicated amount of £30.4 million to renovate Buckingham Palace. As of March 2019, the Sovereign Grant Reserve amounts to £44.4 million, with £36.8 million of it set aside for work on Buckingham Palace. In July 2023, the Treasury announced that owing to a substantial increase in income to the Crown Estate primarily from new wind farm leases on the foreshore, the grant will be 12% of the Crown Estate's net profits in the following year, down from 25%, although still an increase in real pounds over time. As of 2026 the Grant was set to rise to £138m with plans for the core grant to double from around £50m to £100m in 2027.

=== Civil list ===
Until 1760, the monarch met all official expenses from hereditary revenues, which included the profits of the Crown Estate (the royal property portfolio). King George III agreed to surrender the hereditary revenues of the Crown in return for payments called the civil list. Under this arrangement, the Crown Estate remained the property of the sovereign, but the hereditary revenues of the crown were placed at the disposal of the House of Commons. The civil list was paid from public funds and was intended to support the exercise of the monarch's duties as head of state of Great Britain. This arrangement persisted from 1760 until 2012. In modern times, the Government's profits from the Crown Estate always significantly exceeded the civil list. Under the civil list arrangements, the royal family faced criticism for the lack of transparency surrounding Royal finances. The National Audit Office was not entitled to audit the Royal Household.

Queen Elizabeth II received £7.9 million a year from the civil list between 2001 and 2012. The total income of the Royal Household from the Treasury was always significantly larger than the civil list because it included additional income such as grants-in-aid from the Treasury and revenues from the Duchies of Cornwall and Lancaster. The total Royal Household income for the financial years 2011–12 and 2012–13 was £30 million per annum, followed by a 14% cut in the following year. However, the Treasury provided an additional £1 million to pay for Diamond Jubilee celebrations in 2012.

Royal expenditure differs from income owing to the use of a Reserve Fund, which can be added to or drawn from. The official reported annual expenditure of the Head of State was £41.5 million for the 2008–09 financial year. This figure did not include the cost of security provided by the police and the Army and some other expenses. The campaign group Republic, which promotes republicanism in the United Kingdom, says that the full annual cost of the British monarchy is £510 million a year, when including lost revenue from the two duchies and potential commercial use of the royal palaces, security costs, and costs born by local councils during royal visits.

== Assets held in trust by the Sovereign ==
A number of possessions are held in trust by the Sovereign. These possessions are exempt from inheritance tax.

- The Crown Estate is one of the largest property portfolios in the United Kingdom, producing £211 million for the Treasury in the financial year 2007–08 and with holdings of £7.3 billion in 2011. The Crown Estate is not the personal property of the monarch. It cannot be sold by the sovereign in a personal capacity, nor do any revenues, or debts, from the estate accrue to him. Instead, the Crown Estate is owned by the monarch in right of the Crown, a corporation sole representing the legal embodiment of the state, solely for the duration of the monarch's reign. It is held in trust and governed by Act of Parliament, to which it makes an annual report. It is run independently and its profits go to the Treasury. Revenue from the Crown Estate has been predicted to double in real terms between 2010 and 2020 with additional lease revenues deriving from the development of offshore wind farms within Britain's Renewable Energy Zone, the rights of which were granted to the Crown Estate by the Energy Act 2004.
- The Duchies of Lancaster and Cornwall are entities holding land and other assets to produce an income for, respectively, the British Sovereign (now King Charles III) and the monarch's eldest son (if he is next in line to the throne). The revenue profits of the Duchy of Lancaster are presented to the Sovereign each year and form part of the Privy Purse, providing income for both the official and private expenses of the monarch. The Duke of Cornwall receives revenue for charitable work and official activities. These financial arrangements also cover the official expenditure of some members of his immediate family. In 1971, a private members' bill introduced to Parliament by the Labour MP Willie Hamilton to nationalise the two duchies and the Crown lands was defeated, although more than 100 MPs supported it.
- The occupied official royal residences such as Buckingham Palace, Holyrood Palace and Windsor Castle are held in trust by the sovereign, as is the Palace of Westminster. The Royal Household is expected to use the Sovereign Grant to maintain the residences. In May 2009, the Queen requested an extra £4 million annually from the government to carry out a backlog of repairs to Buckingham Palace. In 2010, the Royal Household requested an additional grant from the Department for Culture, Media and Sport but were refused on the basis that the scheme was "aimed at schools, hospitals, councils and housing associations for heating programmes which benefit low-income families". More than a third of the Royal estate was in disrepair by 2012–13 according to a report by the Public Accounts Committee. The cost of restoration was estimated to be £50 million, but the Reserve Fund was at a historic low of £1 million. The monarch is also responsible for using the Sovereign Grant to pay the wages of 431 of the Royal Household staff, amounting to £18.2 million in 2014–15. In 2013, The Guardian reported that Buckingham Palace was using zero-hour contracts for its summer staff. In 2015, it was reported that at least four senior officials had been made redundant to reduce costs.
- The Royal Collection is the art collection of the British royal family. It is one of the largest and most important art collections in the world, containing more than 7,000 paintings, 40,000 watercolours and drawings, about 150,000 old master prints, historical photographs, tapestries, furniture, ceramics, books, gold and silver plate, arms and armour, jewellery and other works of art. The collection includes the Crown Jewels in the Tower of London (including the crown, orb and sceptre). It is physically dispersed between 13 Royal residences and former residences across Britain. Although the collection belongs to the sovereign, it is not his personal property as a private individual. Instead the collection is held in trust by the King for his successors and the nation. The Treasury says these assets are "vested in the sovereign and cannot be alienated". Income is generated by the collection from public admissions and other sources. This income is received by the Royal Collection Trust, the collection's management charity, and not by the King.
- The Royal Archives comprises collections including diaries, letters, household papers and administrative records of the British monarchy.
- Royal palaces and parks are traditionally the property of the monarch, but those no longer occupied by the monarchy or used by the government are generally operated by public charities, Historic Royal Palaces, and Royal Parks.

== Private estate of the Sovereign ==
Queen Elizabeth II had a private income from her personal investment portfolio, though her personal wealth and income were not known. In 2002, she inherited her mother's estate, thought to have been worth £70 million (the equivalent of about £130 million today). Sandringham House and Balmoral Castle are privately owned by the Sovereign.

=== Estimates of personal wealth ===
Jock Colville, a former private secretary to Queen Elizabeth II (when she was Princess Elizabeth) and a director of her bank, Coutts, estimated her wealth at £2 million in 1971 (the equivalent of about £25 million today). An official statement from Buckingham Palace in 1993 called estimates of £100 million "grossly overstated".

Forbes magazine estimated the Queen's net worth at around $500 million (about £325 million) in 2011, while an analysis by the Bloomberg Billionaires Index put it at $425 million (about £275 million) in 2015. In 2012, the Sunday Times estimated the Queen's wealth as being £310 million ($504 million), and that year the Queen received a Guinness World Record as Wealthiest Queen.

The Sunday Times Rich List 2015 estimated her wealth at £340 million, making her the 302nd richest person in the United Kingdom; that was the first year she was not among the Sunday Times Rich List's top 300 most wealthy since the list began in 1989. She was number one on the list when it began in 1989, with a reported wealth of £5.2 billion, which included state assets that were not hers personally, (approximately £13.8 billion in today's value). In 2023, The Guardian estimated Charles's personal wealth at £1.8 billion (EUR 2 billion, USD 2.2 billion). This estimate includes the assets of the Duchy of Lancaster worth £653 million (and paying Charles an annual income of £20 million), jewels worth £533 million, real estate worth £330 million, shares and investments worth £142 million, a stamp collection worth at least £100 million, racehorses worth £27 million, artworks worth £24 million, and cars worth £6.3 million. Most of this wealth was inherited by Charles from his mother, Elizabeth II, and was exempt from inheritance tax.

== Parliamentary annuities ==
Prince Philip, Duke of Edinburgh, received a parliamentary annuity of £359,000 per year from the Treasury. In the past some other members of the British royal family also received funding in the form of parliamentary annuities. The Civil List Act 1952 provided for an allowance to Princess Margaret as well as allowances to the Queen's younger children among others. The Civil List Act 1972 added further members of the royal family to the annuity list. By 2002, there were eight recipients of parliamentary annuities, all receiving a combined total of £1.5 million annually. Between 1993 and 2012 the Queen voluntarily refunded the cost of these annuities to the Treasury. The Sovereign Grant Act 2011 abolished all of these other than that received by the then Duke of Edinburgh. Subsequently, the living costs of the members of the royal family who have carried out official duties, including the Princess Royal, Andrew Mountbatten-Windsor, and the Duke and Duchess of Edinburgh, have mainly been met through the sovereign's income from the Duchy of Lancaster.

== Taxation ==
The Crown has a legal tax-exempt status because certain Acts of Parliament do not apply to it. The Crown and the duchies of Lancaster and Cornwall are not subject to legislation concerning income tax, capital gains tax or inheritance tax. Furthermore, the Sovereign has no legal liability to pay such taxes. The Duchy of Cornwall claims a Crown exemption meaning the Prince of Wales is not legally liable to pay income or corporation tax on Duchy revenues, although this has been disputed. The prince voluntarily pays income tax, although questions have been raised about expense claims that would limit his tax liability.

A "Memorandum of Understanding on Royal Taxation" was published on 5 February 1993 and amended in 1996, 2009, 2013 and 2023. The 2023 update was due to the change in monarch. The current memorandum describes the arrangements by which Charles III and Prince William made voluntary payments to HM Revenue and Customs in lieu of tax to compensate for their tax exemption. The details of the payments are private.

Queen Elizabeth II voluntarily paid a sum equivalent to income tax on her private income and income from the Privy Purse (which includes the Duchy of Lancaster) that was not used for official purposes. The Sovereign Grant is exempted. A sum equivalent to capital gains tax is voluntarily paid on any gains from the disposal of private assets made after 5 April 1993. Many of the Sovereign's assets were acquired earlier than this date but payment is made only on the gains made afterwards. Arrangements also exist for a sum in lieu of inheritance tax to be voluntarily paid on some of the Queen's private assets. Property passing from monarch to monarch is exempted, as is property passing from the consort of a former monarch to the current monarch.

King Charles III, when he was Prince of Wales, voluntarily paid a sum equivalent to income tax on that part of his income from the Duchy of Cornwall that was in excess of what was needed to meet official expenditure. From 1969, he made voluntary tax payments of 50% of the profits, but this reduced to 25% in 1981 when he married Lady Diana Spencer. These arrangements were replaced by the memorandum in 1993. The income of the Prince of Wales from sources other than the Duchy of Cornwall is subject to tax in the normal way.

== Lobbying and legal exemptions ==
In November 1973, Queen Elizabeth II's private lawyer successfully lobbied the UK government to change proposed legislation in order to conceal her private wealth from the public. The government subsequently inserted a clause into the law granting itself the power to exempt companies used by “heads of state” from new transparency measures. This hid the Queen's private shareholdings and investments until 2011.

On other occasions the monarch's advisers requested exclusions from proposed laws relating to road safety and land policy that might affect her estates, and pressed for government policy on historic sites to be altered.

The Sovereign was exempted from the 2017 Cultural Property (Armed Conflicts) Act, a law that seeks to prevent the destruction of cultural heritage, such as archaeological sites, works of art and important books, in future wars. This means police are barred from searching the Sovereign's private estates for stolen or looted artefacts.

The Queen's lawyers also lobbied Scottish ministers to change a draft law, the Heat Networks (Scotland) Bill, to exempt her private land from an initiative to cut carbon emissions. As a result, the Queen was the only person in Scotland not required to facilitate the construction of pipelines to heat buildings using renewable energy.

The Guardian identified 67 instances in which Scottish bills have been reviewed by the Queen. They include legislation dealing with planning laws, property taxation, protections from tenants and a 2018 bill that prevents forestry inspectors from entering crown land without the Queen's permission.

A spokesperson for the Queen said: "Queen's Consent is a parliamentary process, with the role of sovereign purely formal. Consent is always granted by the monarch where requested by government."
