= Civil List Act 1837 =

Act of the Parliament of the United Kingdom

Civil List Act 1837 (Note: The citation of this act by this short title was authorised by section 5 of, and the second schedule to, the Statute Law Revision Act 1948. Due to the repeal of those provisions, it is now authorised by section 19(2) of the Interpretation Act 1978.)
- Act of Parliament
- Parliament of the United Kingdom
- Long title: An Act for the Support of Her Majesty's Household, and of the Honour and Dignity of the Crown of the United Kingdom of Great Britain and Ireland.
- Citation: 1 & 2 Vict. c. 2
- Territorial extent: United Kingdom

Dates
- Royal assent: 23 December 1837
- Commencement: 23 December 1837 (Note: Section 1.)
Other legislation
Amended by	Statute Law Revision Act 1874; Civil List Act 1901; Civil List Act 1952; Statute Law Revision Act 1963; Statute Law Revision Act 1964; Civil List Act 1972; Civil List (Increase of Financial Provision) Order 1990; Sovereign Grant Act 2011

Status: Amended

Text of statute as originally enacted

Revised text of statute as amended

Text of the Civil List Act 1837 as in force today (including any amendments) within the United Kingdom, from legislation.gov.uk.

The Civil List Act 1837 (1 & 2 Vict. c. 2) is an act of the Parliament of the United Kingdom, signed into law on 23 December 1837.

It reiterated the principles of the civil list system, stating that the newly accessioned Queen Victoria undertook to transfer all hereditary revenues of the Crown to the Treasury during her reign, and that all existing Acts to this end were to remain in force. The sum of £385,000 was to be payable annually out of the Consolidated Fund for the upkeep of the royal household, applied as laid down in a schedule, and the sum of £200,000 granted for this purpose during the previous session was to be considered part of the first payment.

An additional £1,200 per annum was granted to defray the cost of civil list pensions. This was given on the condition that any new pensions granted would be given only to those who had "just claims on the royal benefice" or those who had gained the gratitude of the sovereign and the country for personal services to the Crown, or for public duties, or for services to the arts, science or literature. A list of all pensions was to be laid before Parliament. The hereditary duties on beer, ale and cider were to be remitted during the Queen's lifetime, and any powers exercised by the Crown relating to the small branches of hereditary revenue were unaffected.

Finally, the act granted £10,000 for home secret service.

Schedule
First class	for the Queen's privy purse	£60,000
Second class	salaries of the Queen's household and retired allowances	£131,260
Third class	expenses of the Queen's household	£172,500
Fourth class	royal bounty, alms, and special services	£13,200
Fifth class	pensions	£——
Sixth class	unappropriated monies	£8,040
Total		£385,000
Note that the £1,200 paid for pensions was an additional payment, and not part of the £385,000 total

== Subsequent developments ==
In section 14 of the act, the words " or of the duties of one shilling and six pence respectively " were repealed by section 1 of, and the schedule to, the Statute Law Revision Act 1963, which came into force on 31 July 1963.

In section 14 of the act, the words "net and clear of all taxes or charges for or in respect of any land tax and" were repealed by section 1 of, and the schedule to, the Statute Law Revision Act 1964, which came into force on 31 July 1964.

== See also ==
- Pensions in the United Kingdom
- Civil list
- Prince of Wales's Children Act 1889
