= Privy Purse =

British sovereign's private income

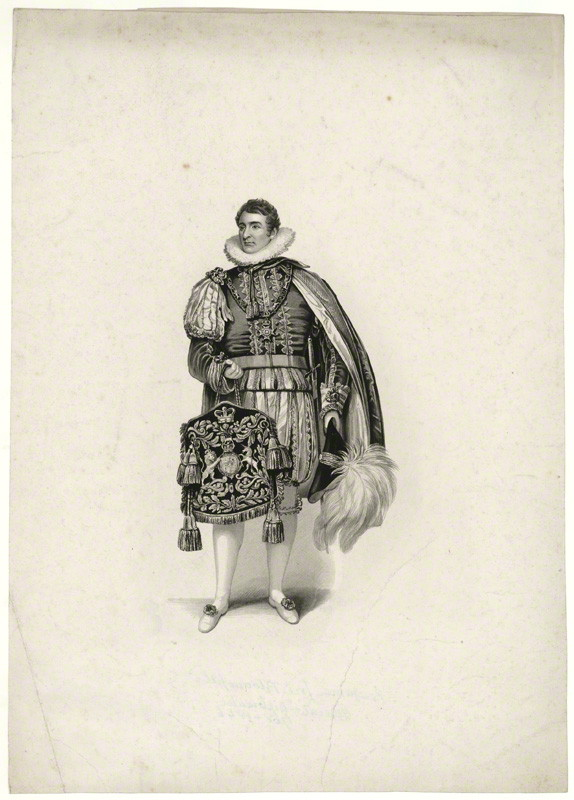
Lord Bloomfield as Keeper of the Privy Purse, carrying a ceremonial purse at the coronation of George IV in July 1821.

The Privy Purse is the British sovereign's private income, mostly from the Duchy of Lancaster. This amounted to £24.2 million in net income for 2024/25.

== Overview ==
The Duchy is a landed estate of approximately 46,000 acres (200 square kilometres) held in trust for the sovereign since 1399. It also has 190 miles (310 kilometres) of foreshore. The Duchy was valued at approximately £533 million in 2018. The land is organised into the Lancashire Survey, the Yorkshire Survey, the Crewe Survey, the Needwood Estate and the South Survey.

The sovereign is not entitled to the Duchy's capital, but the net revenues of the Duchy are the property of the sovereign in right of the Duchy of Lancaster. While the income is private, the King uses the larger part of it to meet official expenses incurred by other members of the British royal family. Only the King receives payments from Parliament that are not reimbursed by the King.

== Administrators ==
=== Chancellor of the Duchy of Lancaster ===
The Chancellor of the Duchy of Lancaster, who is the equivalent of the chairman of the trustees, has for the past several centuries always been a Government minister, although this is not a requirement.

=== Keeper of the Privy Purse ===
The Keeper of the Privy Purse looks after the sovereign's personal financial affairs. His title is derived from the Privy Purse (an embroidered bag borne by the Keeper at a coronation) which contrasts with his Department's present-day use of computers and up-to-date accounting procedures. He manages the revenues which come from the Duchy of Lancaster. The Privy Purse meets both official expenditure incurred by The King as sovereign and private expenditure.

=== Treasurer to the King ===
In recent years, the office of Keeper has been held jointly with that of Treasurer to the King, who is responsible for the use of the Civil List, funds used to meet official expenditure relating to the King's duties as Head of State. He also oversees the grant-in-aid from the Royal Household for the maintenance of the occupied royal palaces and for royal travel. He is also responsible for the property maintenance of the occupied royal palaces (such as Buckingham Palace and St James's Palace) and their gardens, for the financial aspects of royal travel, for personnel matters in the Royal Household, for the King's private estates (which include Balmoral Castle and Sandringham House) and for the commercial activities of the Royal Collection Trust (for which annual accounts are published).

== History ==
In the past, Great Britain's civil government day-to-day costs were paid for by the sovereign under normal circumstances, the monies in this Public Purse being raised from the income of the Crown Estate lands and holdings. Under extraordinary circumstances, namely in time of war or during budget shortfalls, Parliament raised additional monies through taxation. The system was to a large degree self-funding through the Crown's large holdings, taxes being applied only when necessary, and almost always at the risk of public outcry. Taxes were normally very low, and the necessity to go to Parliament to fund wars was an effective check on the monarch's power.

As the role of the government increased in the 18th century, the Public Purse was increasingly unable to raise enough to fund the development of the country. In 1760 when George III came to the throne, it was decided that the whole cost of civil government should be provided by Parliament, with the Crown surrendering most of the hereditary revenues (principally the net surplus of the Crown Estate) by the king for the duration of the reign. In this system, Parliament was responsible for the finances of the state, including paying the Crown the Civil List allowance to meet the sovereign's official expenses. In the fiscal year 2007/2008, the Crown Estate paid the Treasury £211.0 million in return for £7.9 million in Civil List payments to the Queen.

In 2012, the Civil List was replaced by the Sovereign Grant, through the Sovereign Grant Act 2011.

== See also ==
- Privy Purse in India
- Duchy of Cornwall
