= Prince of Wales's Children Act 1889 =

Act of the Parliament of the United Kingdom

Prince of Wales’s Children Act 1889
- Act of Parliament
- Parliament of the United Kingdom
- Long title: An Act to enable His Royal Highness the Prince of Wales to make provision for the maintenance of His children.
- Citation: 52 & 53 Vict. c. 35
- Territorial extent: United Kingdom

Dates
- Royal assent: 26 August 1889
- Commencement: 26 August 1889 (Note: The Acts of Parliament (Commencement) Act 1793.)
- Repealed: 22 January 1901
Other legislation
Repealed by	Civil List Act 1901

Status: Repealed

Text of statute as originally enacted

Revised text of statute as amended

The Prince of Wales’s Children Act 1889 (52 & 53 Vict. c. 35) was an act of the Parliament of the United Kingdom. It was enacted to provide for state-funded annuities from the civil list for the children of Queen Victoria's oldest son, Albert Edward, Prince of Wales.

== Background ==
=== Queen Victoria's children and the Civil List ===
The financial provision for each of the Sovereign's children had been approached on an as-needed basis during the reign of Queen Victoria. The Prince of Wales enjoyed the revenues of the Duchy of Cornwall, as well as an annuity of £40,000 from the Civil List; his wife, Alexandra of Denmark, had also been granted an annuity of £10,000 upon their marriage, which was to be increased to £30,000 if her husband died before ascending the Throne.

Each of Queen Victoria's sons had received annuities of £15,000 from the Civil List upon reaching the age of majority, which were increased to £25,000 upon their respective marriages, with provision made for each of their widows to receive £6,000 annually if they outlived their husbands. The Queen's daughters were each granted an annuity of £6,000 for life upon their respective marriages, in addition to an official dowry of £30,000 (in accordance with tradition, the Queen's eldest daughter, Victoria, Princess Royal, was granted a larger financial settlement upon her marriage — a dowry of £40,000 and an annuity of £8,000).

=== Civil List payments to the Sovereign's grandchildren ===
Historical precedent for state-funded financial provision from the Civil List for the children of the Prince of Wales or other male-line grandchildren of the Sovereign was less clear. The existence of legitimate male-line grandchildren of a Sovereign or heir-apparent was comparatively rare during the reigns of Queen Victoria's predecessors. During 18th and 19th centuries, the only individuals falling into this category who reached adulthood (who had not subsequently become children of the Sovereign) were:

- Princess Sophia of Gloucester (1773 - 1844)
- Prince William of Gloucester (1776 - 1834) (2nd Duke of Gloucester and Edinburgh from 1805)
- Princess Charlotte of Wales (1796 - 1817)
- Princess Alexandrina Victoria of Kent (who became heiress presumptive to the Crown in 1830 and succeeded as Sovereign of the United Kingdom in 1837)
- Prince George of Cambridge (1819 - 1904) (2nd Duke of Cambridge from 1850)
- Prince George of Cumberland (1819 - 1878) (who later became King of Hanover and 2nd Duke of Cumberland and Teviotdale in 1851)
- Princess Augusta of Cambridge (1822 - 1916)
- Princess Mary Adelaide of Cambridge (1833 - 1897)

==== Future Sovereigns ====
The last child of an heir apparent who had reached an age where financial provision was considered necessary was George III's granddaughter Princess Charlotte of Wales (1796–1817), the only daughter of the Prince Regent. Princess Charlotte, widely expected to ascend the throne as Queen after the deaths of her grandfather and father, received Claremont House, Surrey, which Parliament granted £60,000 for the purchase of, and her husband was granted an annuity of £50,000. Similarly, during the reigns of her uncles George IV and William IV, financial provision for Princess Alexandrina Victoria of Kent was made as the likelihood of her eventual succession to the Throne increased; in 1825 her mother Victoria, Duchess of Kent was granted £6,000 annually for the Princess' maintenance and education, which was increased by a further £10,000 in 1831.

==== Royal cousins, nephews and nieces ====
For Princes and Princesses who were not expected to became the children of the Sovereign, the provisions were even less consistent. In 1778 legislation was passed which provided for annuities of £8,000 to George III's nephew Prince William Frederick, Duke of Gloucester and Edinburgh and £4,000 to the King's niece Princess Sophia of Gloucester. Prince William Frederick's annuity was later increased to £14,000 in 1806.

In 1850, Queen Victoria's first cousins Prince George, Duke of Cambridge and Princess Mary Adelaide of Cambridge had been granted annuities of £12,000 and £3,000 respectively following the death of their father. Their sister, Princess Augusta of Cambridge, had also been provided £3,000 a year from the Civil List in anticipation of her marriage, which would become payable only after the death of her father. Each of these annuities had required an Act of Parliament: An Act to enable Her Majesty to make a suitable Provision for His Royal Highness the Duke of Cambridge, and also for Her Royal Highness the Princess Mary of Cambridge, 1850. and the Duchess of Mecklenburgh Strelitz's Annuity Act 1843.

The case-by-case approach to approving additional grants for members of the Royal Family resulted in a series of Parliamentary debates, covered in detail in the British press, regarding the cost to the public purse of the Royal Family.

=== Queen Victoria's grandchildren ===
In contrast to the succession crises triggered by the death of Princess Charlotte of Wales in 1817 (although her grandfather George III had fathered fifteen legitimate children, Princess Charlotte was the only legitimate grandchild of the King during her lifetime), Queen Victoria and her husband Prince Albert produced nine children during their marriage.

Their eldest son, Albert Edward, Prince of Wales had married Princess Alexandra of Denmark in 1863, during the period between 1864 and 1869 their marriage had produced five children who survived until adulthood; Prince Albert Victor of Wales, Prince George of Wales, Princess Louise of Wales, Princess Victoria of Wales, and Princess Maud of Wales. Consequently, by the mid-to-late 1880s the Prince of Wales' children were entering adulthood.

The Queen also was the mother to three other sons; Prince Alfred, Duke of Edinburgh, Prince Arthur, Duke of Connaught, and Prince Leopold, Duke of Albany. Each of the Queen's younger sons had also married and fathered children of their own.

In 1888 the Queen and the-then Prime Minister of the United Kingdom Robert Gascoyne-Cecil, 3rd Marquess of Salisbury discussed their views regarding the addition of members of the third generation of the Royal Family to the Civil list. Lord Salisbury supported the creation of a single annual grant, which he felt would avoid the embarrassment of parliamentary debates and newspaper coverage which had arisen each time that a one-off addition to the Civil list had been addressed for each of the Queen's children. These these were viewed as "ill-mannered" and filled with "wild statements" which Lord Salisbury ultimately viewed as being damaging to the Crown. On 16 August the Queen made her views known to the Prime Minister; it was her belief that there was a clear precedent for the financial provision from the Civil list for all male-line grandchildren of the Sovereign, emphasising the Acts of Parliament in 1843 and 1850 which made provision for her Cambridge cousins.

The subject of Civil list payments for the Queen's grandchildren became more pressing in 1889; on 8 January Prince Albert Victor reached the age of twenty-five, and it was widely felt that the creation of a separate establishment and household for the second-in-line to the Throne and presumed future-King was becoming overdue. On 27 July of the same year, the Prince of Wales's oldest daughter Princess Louise of Wales married Alexander Duff, 6th Earl of Fife; as each of her paternal aunts had received a state-funded dowry and Civil list annuity after becoming engaged, Louise's marriage placed further scrutiny on what, if any financial provision would be made for the next generation of the Royal family.

== Debate ==
As the Prince of Wales' children came into adulthood during the 1880s, the need to make financial provision for each Prince and Princess became an increasingly pertinent issue. In the early 1880s Radical MPs warned that Parliament would soon be asked to support “more than a score” of Queen Victoria’s grandchildren, and pressed for a select committee to examine both the Crown’s private resources and the extent of any parliamentary obligation to provide for royal children.

In 1889 the Prince of Wales' eldest daughter, Princess Louise of Wales, married the 6th Earl of Fife (created Duke of Fife by the Queen following the marriage). Furthermore, the Prince of Wales' oldest son Prince Albert Victor of Wales reached the age of 25, and it was felt that a separate household and establishment for second-in-line to the Throne and presumed future-King was now overdue.

On 2 July 1889, Queen Victoria formally submitted requests to the Prime Minister for financial provision to be made from the Civil List for Prince Albert Victor and Princess Louise. In the weeks preceding the request, the Prince of Wales had privately consulted William Ewart Gladstone, then Leader of the Opposition, on how the matter might be settled. Gladstone warned that public opinion would not tolerate “piecemeal” requests, and urged a once-and-for-all arrangement. The Prince agreed, and on 5 July 1889 sent Gladstone a memorandum detailing the specific sums he wished for each of his children, including annuities for his daughters, dowries on marriage, and establishment grants for his sons.

The Prince requested that his daughters each be granted either £5,000 annuities for life and dowries of £20,000, or £3,000 annually immediately, which would increase to £6,000 after their grandmother's death, with dowries of £15,000. He also requested £15,000 annually for Prince Albert Victor, with provision for this amount to increase to £25,000 after marriage. He also requested that provision be made for £25,000 to be granted to his younger son, Prince George of Wales, after the death of the Queen in order to ensure that his second son received the same financial entitlement as the younger sons of Queen Victoria.

On 4 July 1889, the Leader of the Opposition moved that a Select Committee be appointed to review the question. The Committee, composed of 10 Conservatives, 3 Liberal Unionists, 7 Gladstonian Liberals, 2 Radicals and one Liberal–Labour MP, was formed.

After a series of Parliamentary debates, and a detailed examination of historic financial grants to the Royal Family by the committee, a final sum of £36,000 per year was settled. An attempt was made by Radical MPs to reduce the size of the grant to £21,000, which they argued would be sufficient to provide £10,000 to Prince Albert Victor of Wales, £8,000 to Prince George of Wales, and £3,000 to Princess Louise, Duchess of Fife, Princess Victoria of Wales and Princess Maud of Wales.

This amount was to be paid to the Prince of Wales as trustee for his children, and he was provided with the discretion to allocate the amounts in portions as he saw fit. Contemporary newspapers reported that as part of the negotiations over the Bill, the Queen had privately agreed not to seek financial provision from the Civil List for her other grandchildren.

== Impact and legacy ==
The act applied only during the lifetime of Queen Victoria; upon his accession as King Edward VII in 1901, financial provision for the new King's children was established under the Civil List Act 1901. Despite the act ceasing to take effect after the Queen's death in 1901, the negotiations which had preceded its creation had the long term impact of denying any state-funded financial provision being made for Queen Victoria's other male-line grandchildren until the mid-to-late twentieth century.

Queen Victoria's younger sons Prince Alfred, Duke of Edinburgh, Prince Arthur, Duke of Connaught and Strathearn, and Prince Leopold, Duke of Albany each fathered offspring who, by virtue of being male-line grandchildren of the Sovereign, were princes and princesses of the United Kingdom.

Prince Alfred, Duke of Edinburgh, Queen Victoria's second son, succeeded his uncle Ernst II in 1893 as Sovereign Duke of the German Duchy of Saxe-Coburg and Gotha. Following his accession, Parliament debated his continuing Civil List provision; Alfred retained only £10,000 of his British annuity to maintain his London residence, Clarence House, while surrendering the remainder. Although his five children Prince Alfred of Edinburgh, Princess Marie of Edinburgh, Princess Victoria Melita of Edinburgh, Princess Alexandra of Edinburgh and Princess Beatrice of Edinburgh retained their rank as Princes and Princesses of the United Kingdom, as the children of the sovereign Duke of a German State they did not receive any financial provision from the British Civil List.

Alfred’s only son, Alfred, Hereditary Prince of Saxe-Coburg and Gotha, died in February 1899. Following this, the next in line to the ducal throne of Saxe-Coburg and Gotha was Prince Arthur, Duke of Connaught and Strathearn. The Duke of Connaught proceeded to renounce the right to succeed to the Duchy on behalf of himself and his only son Prince Arthur of Connaught. This left Prince Charles Edward, Duke of Albany as next in line to succeed Alfred as Duke of Saxe-Coburg and Gotha. Parliament was informed of this change in 1899 during debates regarding the Coburg succession.

By the early twentieth century only four male-line grandchildren of Queen Victoria (other than the children of the Prince of Wales) remained domiciled in the British Isles: Prince Arthur of Connaught, Princess Margaret of Connaught, Princess Patricia of Connaught, and Princess Alice of Albany. Princess Patricia voluntarily relinquished her royal titles upon her marriage to a commoner in 1919, becoming Lady Patricia Ramsay. Princess Margaret married the second in line to the Swedish Throne, Prince Gustaf Adolf, Duke of Scania, in 1905. Prince Arthur of Connaught played an increasingly prominent role in British public life in adulthood; upon the accession of his cousin King George V in 1910, Prince Arthur and his father were the only adult British Princes in the wider Royal Family. From 1920 to 1924 he served as Governor-General of South Africa, and was succeeded in the role by Princess Alice's husband Alexander Cambridge, 1st Earl of Athlone (who was also the brother of Queen Mary).

Lord Athlone had married Princess Alice of Albany in 1904; at the time he was known as Prince Alexander of Teck. Although he was formally a minor German Prince, he was the son of a British Princess, Princess Mary Adelaide of Cambridge, and had been raised in the United Kingdom. Consequently, he chose to renounce his German titles during the 1917 House of Windsor reforms; he became a British subject and was made Earl of Athlone.

Despite their participation in public life and close relationship to the reigning monarch, no provision was made for Prince Arthur, Princess Margaret, Princess Patricia or Princess Alice from the British Civil List in the Civil List Act 1901, Civil List Act 1910 or Civil List Act 1937. Following the accession of Queen Elizabeth II in 1952, provision was made in the new Civil List Act 1952 for a £25,000 fund to be paid to Trustees and allocated to members of the Royal family who performed royal duties in proportion decided by the sovereign. In the later decades of the 20th century, this fund (which had increased to £85,000 annually by 1972) was used to provide stated-funded annuities to male-line grandchildren of former sovereigns, including Princess Alice, Countess of Athlone, Prince Edward, Duke of Kent, Princess Alexandra, and Prince Richard, Duke of Gloucester.

== See also ==
- British royal family
- Civil list
- Sovereign Grant Act 2011
- Finances of the British royal family
