= 1 Geo. 2 =

1 Geo. 2 is a citation that can refer to acts from one of two sessions of the Parliament of Great Britain:

- 1 Geo. 2. St. 1, the sixth session of the 6th Parliament of Great Britain in 1727
- 1 Geo. 2. St. 2, the first session of the 7th Parliament of Great Britain in 1728
