= E. A. Reitan =

American historian

Earl Aaron Reitain (May 3, 1925 – October 15, 2015) was an American historian.

He was born in Grove City, Minnesota and served in World War II as a United States Army rifleman. He was awarded both the Purple Heart and the Bronze Star Medal for his service. Reitan attended Concordia College after the war and was awarded a doctorate in 1954 from the University of Illinois. Between 1970 and 1973 he was chairman of Illinois State University's department of history.

Reitan's first article on the civil list of Georgian Britain was called "seminal" by W. A. Speck, who also called his Politics, Finance and the People the "definitive account of the campaign for economical reform".

== Works ==
- 'The Civil List in Eighteenth-Century British Politics: Parliamentary Supremacy versus the Independence of the Crown', The Historical Journal, Vol. 9, No. 3 (1966), pp. 318–337.
- 'The "Knowledge Explosion" and the Academic Man', The Journal of General Education, Vol. 18, No. 2 (July 1966), pp. 73–80.
- 'Revenue to Civil List, 1689-1702: The Revolution Settlement and the 'Mixed and Balanced' Constitution', The Historical Journal, Vol. 13, No. 4 (Dec., 1970), pp. 571–588.
- 'The Man with the Multiple-Choice Mind', Academe, Vol. 65, No. 3 (Apr., 1979), pp. 197–201.
- 'Expanding Horizons: Maps in the "Gentleman's Magazine," 1731-1754', Imago Mundi, Vol. 37 (1985), pp. 54–62.
- Politics, War and Empire: Rise of Britain to a World Power, 1688-1792 (1994).
- Tory Radicalism: Margaret Thatcher, John Major, and the Transformation of Modern Britain, 1979-1997 (1997).
- Rifleman: On the Cutting Edge of World War II (2001).
- Crossing the Bridge: Growing up Norwegian-American in Depression and War 1925-1946 (2002).
- The Thatcher Revolution: Margaret Thatcher, John Major, Tony Blair, and the Transformation of Modern Britain (2002).
- Liberalism: Time-Tested Principles for the Twenty-First Century (2003).
- I Was a Teenage Rifleman in World War II (2004).
- Politics, Finance, and the People: Economical Reform in England in the Age of the American Revolution, 1770-1792 (2007).
