= Civil List Act 1727 =

Act of the Parliament of Great Britain

- Act of Parliament
- Parliament of Great Britain
- Long title: An Act for the better Support of His Majesty's Household, and of the Honour and Dignity of the Crown of Great Britain.
- Citation: 1 Geo. 2. St. 1. c. 1
- Territorial extent: Great Britain

Dates
- Royal assent: 17 July 1727
- Commencement: 11 June 1727 (Note: Section 1.)
- Repealed: 15 July 1867
Other legislation
Repealed by	Statute Law Revision Act 1867
Relates to	Civil List Act 1697; Civil List Act 1714; Civil List Act 1760

Status: Repealed

Text of statute as originally enacted

The Civil List Act 1727 (1 Geo. 2. St. 1. c. 1) was an act of the Parliament of Great Britain passed upon the accession of George II.

The act granted the Crown the Civil List revenues (mainly customs and excise), estimated to give the King an annual income of £800,000. If these revenues yielded less than £800,000 then Parliament would make up the shortfall. If on the other hand they were worth more than £800,000, the King could retain the surplus as well. The act differed from previous Civil List arrangements in that under the terms of the act the income of the Crown would increase with the wealth of the nation. In the early years of George II's reign, the revenues fell below the stipulated amount of £800,000 but by the end of his reign he was receiving £876,988.

== Legacy ==
The whole act was repealed by section 1 of, and the schedule to, the Statute Law Revision Act 1867 (30 & 31 Vict. c. 59).
