= Civil List Act 1697 =

Act of the Parliament of England

- Act of Parliament
- Parliament of England
- Long title: An Act for granting to His Majesty a further Subsidy of Tunnage and Poundage towards raiseing the Yearly Summ of Seven hundred thousand Pounds for the Service of His Majesties. Household & other Uses therein mencioned during His Majesties Life.
- Citation: 9 Will. 3. c. 23 (Note: This is the citation in The Statutes of the Realm.); 9 & 10 Will. 3. c. 23 (Note: This is the citation in The Statutes at Large.)
- Territorial extent: England and Wales

Dates
- Royal assent: 5 July 1698
- Commencement: 1 February 1699 (Note: Section 1.)
- Repealed: 5 July 1825
Other legislation
Repealed by	Customs Law Repeal Act 1825
Relates to	Civil List Act 1714; Civil List Act 1727; Civil List Act 1760

Status: Repealed

Text of statute as originally enacted

The Civil List Act 1697 (9 Will. 3. c. 23) was an act of the Parliament of England. This was the first act of Parliament to set the Civil List, although the custom had begun in 1689. The annual amount assigned to King William III and his household was £700,000, an amount that did not change until the beginning of the reign of George III in 1760.

== Subsequent developments ==
The whole act was repealed by the Customs Law Repeal Act 1825 (6 Geo. 4. c. 105), which came into force on 5 July 1825.
