= Civil list =

List of individuals to whom money is paid by the government

A civil list is a list of individuals to whom money is paid by the government, typically for service to the state or as honorary pensions. It is a term especially associated with the United Kingdom, and its former colonies and dominions. It was originally defined as expenses supporting the British monarchy.

== United Kingdom ==
In the United Kingdom, the Civil List was, until 2011, the annual grant that covered some expenses associated with the Sovereign performing their official duties, including those for staff salaries, state visits, public engagements, ceremonial functions and the upkeep of the Royal Households. The cost of transport and security for the royal family, together with property maintenance and other sundry expenses, were covered by separate grants from individual government departments. The Civil List was abolished under the Sovereign Grant Act 2011.

=== History ===
Civil List Act 1697
- Act of Parliament
- Parliament of England
- Long title: An Act for granting to His Majesty a further Subsidy of Tunnage and Poundage towards raiseing the Yearly Summ of Seven hundred thousand Pounds for the Service of His Majesties. Household & other Uses therein mencioned during His Majesties Life.
- Citation: 9 Will. 3. c. 23 (Note: This is the citation in The Statutes of the Realm.); 9 & 10 Will. 3. c. 23 (Note: This is the citation in The Statutes at Large).
- Territorial extent: England and Wales

Dates
- Royal assent: 5 July 1698
- Commencement: 1 February 1699 (Note: Section 1.)
- Repealed: 5 July 1825
Other legislation
Repealed by	Customs Law Repeal Act 1825
Relates to	Civil List Act 1714; Civil List Act 1727; Civil List Act 1760

Status: Repealed

Text of statute as originally enacted

Civil List Act 1714
- Act of Parliament
- Parliament of Great Britain
- Long title: An Act for the better support of his Majesty's houshold and of the honour and dignity of the crown of Great Britain.
- Citation: 1 Geo. 1. St. 1. c. 1

Dates
- Royal assent: 21 August 1714
- Commencement: 1 August 1714 (Note: Start of session.)
- Repealed: 15 July 1867
Other legislation
Repealed by	Statute Law Revision Act 1867
Relates to	Civil List Act 1697; Civil List Act 1727; Civil List Act 1760

Status: Repealed

Text of statute as originally enacted

Civil List Act 1727
- Act of Parliament
- Parliament of Great Britain
- Long title: An Act for the better Support of His Majesty's Household, and of the Honour and Dignity of the Crown of Great Britain.
- Citation: 1 Geo. 2. St. 1. c. 1
- Territorial extent: Great Britain

Dates
- Royal assent: 17 July 1727
- Commencement: 11 June 1727
- Repealed: 15 July 1867
Other legislation
Repealed by	Statute Law Revision Act 1867
Relates to	Civil List Act 1697; Civil List Act 1714; Civil List Act 1760

Status: Repealed

Text of statute as originally enacted

Civil List Act 1760
- Act of Parliament
- Parliament of Great Britain
- Long title: An Act for the Support of his Majesty's Household, and of the Honour and Dignity of the Crown of Great Britain.
- Citation: 1 Geo. 3. c. 1
- Territorial extent: Great Britain

Dates
- Royal assent: 9 December 1760
- Commencement: 26 October 1760
- Repealed: 15 July 1867
Other legislation
Repealed by	Statute Law Revision Act 1867
Relates to	Civil List Act 1697; Civil List Act 1714; Civil List Act 1727

Status: Repealed

Text of statute as originally enacted

Civil List Act 1776
- Act of Parliament
- Parliament of Great Britain
- Long title: An act for the better support of his Majesty's household, and of the honour and dignity of the crown of Great Britain.
- Citation: 17 Geo. 3. c. 21

Dates
- Royal assent: 7 May 1777
- Commencement: 5 January 1777
- Repealed: 21 August 1871
Other legislation
Repealed by	Statute Law Revision Act 1871

Status: Repealed

Text of statute as originally enacted

Civil List Act 1785
- Act of Parliament
- Parliament of Great Britain
- Long title: An Act to authorize the Lord Steward of the Household, the Lord Chamberlain, the Master of the Horse, the Master of the Robes, and the Lords of the Treasury, respectively, to pay Bounties granted by His Majesty to Persons in low and indigent Circumstances.
- Citation: 25 Geo. 3. c. 61

Dates
- Royal assent: 20 July 1785
- Commencement: 25 January 1785
- Repealed: 21 August 1871
Other legislation
Repealed by	Statute Law Revision Act 1871

Status: Repealed

Text of statute as originally enacted

Civil List Act 1804
- Act of Parliament
- Parliament of the United Kingdom
- Long title: An Act for the better Support of His Majesty's Household, and of the Honour and Dignity of the Crown of the United Kingdom; and for preventing Accumulation of Arrears in the Payments out of the Civil List Revenues.
- Citation: 44 Geo. 3. c. 80

Dates
- Royal assent: 20 July 1804
- Commencement: 5 July 1804
- Repealed: 6 August 1872
Other legislation
Repealed by	Statute Law Revision Act 1872

Status: Repealed

Text of statute as originally enacted

Civil List (Ireland) Act 1805
- Act of Parliament
- Parliament of the United Kingdom
- Long title: An act to amend an act made in the parliament of Ireland, for the support of the honour and dignity of his Majesty's crown in Ireland; and for granting to his Majesty a civil list establishment under certain provisions and regulations.
- Citation: 45 Geo. 3. c. 76

Dates
- Royal assent: 2 July 1805
- Commencement: 2 July 1805
- Repealed: 6 August 1872
Other legislation
Amends	Civil List Act 1793
Repealed by	Statute Law Revision Act 1872

Status: Repealed

Text of statute as originally enacted

Civil List Audit Act 1816 (Note: The citation of this act by this short title was authorised by section 1 of, and the first schedule to, the Short Titles Act 1896. Due to the repeal of those provisions it is now authorised by section 19(2) of the Interpretation Act 1978.)
- Act of Parliament
- Parliament of the United Kingdom
- Long title: An Act for the better Regulation of the Civil List.
- Citation: 56 Geo. 3. c. 46

Dates
- Royal assent: 20 June 1816
- Commencement: 5 April 1816
- Repealed: 1 April 2012
Other legislation
Amended by	Statute Law (Repeals) Act 1977; Statute Law (Repeals) Act 1981
Repealed by	Sovereign Grant Act 2011
Relates to	Civil List Act 1901; Civil List Act 1910; Civil List Act 1937

Status: Repealed

Text of statute as originally enacted

Revised text of statute as amended

Civil List Act 1820
- Act of Parliament
- Parliament of the United Kingdom
- Long title: An Act for the Support of His Majesty's Household and of the Honour and Dignity of the Crown of the United Kingdom of Great Britain and Ireland.
- Citation: 1 Geo. 4. c. 1

Dates
- Royal assent: 6 June 1820
- Commencement: 7 June 1820 (Note: The Acts of Parliament (Commencement) Act 1793.)
- Repealed: 5 August 1873
Other legislation
Repealed by	Statute Law Revision Act 1873

Status: Repealed

Text of statute as originally enacted

Civil List Act 1831
- Act of Parliament
- Parliament of the United Kingdom
- Long title: An Act for the Support of His Majesty's Household, and of the Honour and Dignity of the Crown of the United Kingdom of Great Britain and Ireland.
- Citation: 1 Will. 4. c. 25

Dates
- Royal assent: 22 April 1831
- Commencement: 22 April 1831
- Repealed: 18 July 1874
Other legislation
Repealed by	Statute Law Revision Act 1874

Status: Repealed

Text of statute as originally enacted

Civil List Act 1837 (Note: The citation of this act by this short title was authorised by section 5 of, and the second schedule to, the Statute Law Revision Act 1948. Due to the repeal of those provisions, it is now authorised by section 19(2) of the Interpretation Act 1978.)
- Act of Parliament
- Parliament of the United Kingdom
- Long title: An Act for the Support of Her Majesty's Household, and of the Honour and Dignity of the Crown of the United Kingdom of Great Britain and Ireland.
- Citation: 1 & 2 Vict. c. 2
- Territorial extent: United Kingdom

Dates
- Royal assent: 23 December 1837
- Commencement: 23 December 1837
Other legislation
Amended by	Statute Law Revision Act 1874; Civil List Act 1901; Sovereign Grant Act 2011

Status: Amended

Text of statute as originally enacted

Revised text of statute as amended

Civil List Act 1901 (Note: Section 9(5).)
- Act of Parliament
- Parliament of the United Kingdom
- Long title: An Act to make provision for the honour and dignity of the Crown and the Royal Family, and for the payment of certain allowances and pensions.
- Citation: 1 Edw. 7. c. 4

Dates
- Royal assent: 2 July 1901
- Commencement: 22 January 1901 (Note: Section 9(4). The demise of the crown.)
- Repealed: 31 July 1963
Other legislation
Amends	Civil List Act 1837
Repeals/revokes	Annuities (Prince of Wales, etc.) Act 1863; Prince of Wales's Children Act 1889
Amended by	Civil List Act 1910; Civil List Act 1937; Statute Law Revision Act 1950
Repealed by	Statute Law Revision Act 1963
Relates to	Civil List Audit Act 1816

Status: Repealed

Text of statute as originally enacted

Civil List Act 1910
- Act of Parliament
- Parliament of the United Kingdom
- Long title: An Act to make provision for the honour and dignity of the Crown and the Royal Family, and for the payment of certain allowances and pensions.
- Citation: 10 Edw. 7. & 1 Geo. 5. c. 28

Dates
- Royal assent: 3 August 1910
- Commencement: 6 May 1910
- Repealed: 16 June 1977
Other legislation
Amends	Civil List Act 1901; Osborne Estate Act 1902
Amended by	Civil List Act 1937; Statute Law Revision Act 1963
Repealed by	Statute Law (Repeals) Act 1977
Relates to	Civil List Audit Act 1816

Status: Repealed

Text of statute as originally enacted

Civil List Act 1937 (Note: Section 14(5).)
- Act of Parliament
- Parliament of the United Kingdom
- Long title: An Act to make provision for the honour and dignity of the Crown and the Royal Family, and for the payment of certain allowances and pensions; to enable His Majesty to assent to arrangements on behalf of any son of His Majesty being Duke of Cornwall for the payment of certain sums out of the revenues of the Duchy during the minority of the said Duke; and for purposes connected with the matters aforesaid.
- Citation: 1 Edw. 8. & 1 Geo. 6. c. 32

Dates
- Royal assent: 10 June 1937
- Commencement: 20 January 1936 (Note: Section 15(4). The demise of the crown.)
- Repealed: 1 April 2012
Other legislation
Amends	Civil List Act 1837; Civil List Act 1936; Civil List Act 1910
Amended by	Princess Elizabeth's and Duke of Edinburgh's Annuities Act 1948; Civil List Act 1952; Statute Law Revision Act 1963; Civil List Act 1972; Statute Law (Repeals) Act 1977
Repealed by	Sovereign Grant Act 2011
Relates to	Civil List Audit Act 1816

Status: Repealed

Text of statute as originally enacted

Revised text of statute as amended

Following the Glorious Revolution of 1688, the expenses relating to the support of the monarch were largely separated from the ordinary expenses of the state managed by the Exchequer.

In 1697, Parliament under William III fixed the Crown's peacetime revenue at £1,200,000 per year; of this about £700,000 was appropriated towards the Civil List. The sovereigns were expected to use this to defray some of the costs of running the civil government (such as the Civil Service, judges' and ambassadors' salaries) and the payment of pensions, as well as the expenses of the Royal Household and the sovereign's personal expenses. It was from this that the term "Civil List" arose, to distinguish it from the statement of military and naval expenses which were funded through special taxation.

The 1760 accession of George III marked a significant change in royal finances. As his predecessor, George II, had failed to meet all of the specific costs of the civil government in accordance with the previous arrangement, it was decided by the Civil List Act 1760 that George III would surrender the hereditary revenues from the Crown Estate to Parliament for the duration of his reign, and in return Parliament would assume responsibility for most of the costs of the civil government. Parliament would continue to pay the Civil List, which would defray the expenses of the Royal Household and some of the costs of the civil government. George III, however, retained the income from the Duchy of Lancaster.

On the 1830 accession of William IV, the sum voted for the Civil List was restricted to the expenses of the Royal Household, removing any residual responsibilities associated with the cost of the civil government. This finally removed any links between the sovereign and the cost of the civil government. On the accession of Queen Victoria, the Civil List Act 1837—which reiterated the principles of the civil list system and specified all prior Acts as in force—was passed. Upon the accession of subsequent monarchs down to Queen Elizabeth II, this constitutional arrangement was confirmed, but the historical term "Civil List" remained even though the grant had nothing to do with the expenses of the civil government.

In 1931, George V decided to eschew the £50,000 due to him from the Civil List as a result of the Great Depression. As Keeper of the Privy Purse, Sir Frederick Ponsonby wrote to Prime Minister Ramsay MacDonald to say that George had felt it was possible to reject the grant by "exercise of the most rigid economy" and that Queen Mary and other royal family members were "desirous that reductions in these grants should be made during this time of national crisis".

=== Elizabeth II ===
Civil List Act 1952 (Note: Section 14.)
- Act of Parliament
- Parliament of the United Kingdom
- Long title: An Act to make provision for the honour and dignity of the Crown and the Royal Family, as to the disposal in certain circumstances of revenues of the Duchy of Cornwall, and for the payment of certain allowances and pensions.
- Citation: 15 & 16 Geo. 6 & 1 Eliz. 2. c. 37
- Territorial extent: United Kingdom

Dates
- Royal assent: 1 August 1952
- Commencement: various (Note: Section 13.)
Other legislation
Amends	Civil List Act 1837; Civil List Act 1937
Repeals/revokes	Princess Elizabeth's and Duke of Edinburgh's Annuities Act 1948
Amended by	Statute Law Revision Act 1963; Family Law Reform Act 1969; Civil List Act 1972; Sovereign Grant Act 2011; Scotland Act 2016

Status: Amended

Text of statute as originally enacted

Revised text of statute as amended

Text of the Civil List Act 1952 as in force today (including any amendments) within the United Kingdom, from legislation.gov.uk.

Civil List Act 1972 (Note: Section 8(1).)
- Act of Parliament
- Parliament of the United Kingdom
- Long title: An Act to make further provision for the honour and dignity of the Crown and the Royal Family, and for the payment of certain allowances and pensions.
- Citation: 1972 c. 7
- Territorial extent: United Kingdom

Dates
- Royal assent: 24 February 1972
- Commencement: 24 February 1972 (except section 4(1) and the repeal in section 13(1) of the Civil List Act 1952; 1 April 1972 (rest of act); (Note: Section 8(6).)
Other legislation
Amends	Civil List Act 1837; Civil List Act 1937; Civil List Act 1952
Amended by	Civil List Act 1975; Statute Law (Repeals) Act 1977; Sovereign Grant Act 2011

Status: Amended

Text of statute as originally enacted

Revised text of statute as amended

Text of the Civil List Act 1972 as in force today (including any amendments) within the United Kingdom, from legislation.gov.uk.

Civil List Act 1975 (Note: Section 2.)
- Act of Parliament
- Parliament of the United Kingdom
- Long title: An Act to provide for supplementing out of moneys provided by Parliament the sums payable under the enactments mentioned in section 6(1) of the Civil List Act 1972; and to repeal section 5(2)(b) of that Act.
- Citation: 1975 c. 82
- Territorial extent: United Kingdom

Dates
- Royal assent: 19 December 1975
- Commencement: 19 December 1975
- Repealed: 1 April 2012
Other legislation
Amends	Civil List Act 1972
Repealed by	Sovereign Grant Act 2011

Status: Repealed

Text of statute as originally enacted

Revised text of statute as amended

Text of the Civil List Act 1975 as in force today (including any amendments) within the United Kingdom, from legislation.gov.uk.

The last British monarch to receive Civil List payments was Elizabeth II. The Civil List for her reign lasted from her accession in 1952 until its abolition in 2012. During this period the Queen, as head of state, used the Civil List to defray some of the official expenditure of the monarchy.

Only the Queen, the Duke of Edinburgh and the Queen Mother ever received direct funding from the Civil List. Charles, then Prince of Wales, and his immediate family (the Duchess of Cornwall, the Duke and Duchess of Cambridge, and Prince Harry) received their income from the Duchy of Cornwall. The state duties and staff of other members of the royal family were funded from a parliamentary annuity, the amount of which was fully refunded by the Queen to the Treasury. The Queen's consort (Prince Philip, Duke of Edinburgh) received £359,000 per year.

The last two decades of the Civil List were marked by surpluses and deficits. Surpluses in the 1991–2000 Civil List caused by low inflation and the efforts of the Queen and her staff to make the Royal Household more efficient led to the accrual of a £35.3 million reserve by late 2000. Consequently, the Civil List was fixed at £7.9 million annually in 2001, the same amount as in 1991, and remained at that level until its abolition. The reserve was then used to make up the shortfall in the Civil List during the subsequent decade. The Civil List Act 1972 (c. 7) allowed the Treasury to review the level of the payment every ten years, but only allowed for increases and not reductions.

The abolition of the Civil List was announced in the spending review statement to the House of Commons on 20 October 2010 by the Chancellor of the Exchequer, George Osborne. In its place, he said, "the Royal Household will receive a new Sovereign Support Grant linked to a portion of the revenue of the Crown Estate". The Crown Estate is a statutory corporation, run on commercial lines by the Crown Estate Commissioners and generates revenue for HM Treasury every year (an income surplus of £210.7 million for the year ended 31 March 2010). This income is received by the Crown and given to the state as a result of the agreement reached in 1760 that has been renewed at the beginning of each subsequent reign. The Sovereign Grant Act 2011 received royal assent on 18 October 2011. Under this Act, the Sovereign Grant now funds all of the official expenditure of the monarchy, not just the expenditure previously borne by the Civil List.

=== Civil List pensions ===
These are pensions traditionally granted by the Sovereign from the Civil List upon the recommendation of the First Lord of the Treasury. The Civil List Act 1837 (1 & 2 Vict. c. 2) applied the condition that any new pensions should be "granted to such persons only as have just claims on the royal beneficence or who by their personal services to the Crown, or by the performance of duties to the public, or by their useful discoveries in science and attainments in literature and the arts, have merited the gracious consideration of their sovereign and the gratitude of their country." Famous recipients include William Wordsworth, William Barnes, Geraldine Jewsbury, Margaret Oliphant, Christopher Logue, and Molly Parkin. (Lord Byron is often said to have received a civil list pension, but his mother was the actual recipient.) As of 1911, a sum of £1,200 was allotted each year from the Civil List, in addition to the pensions already in force. From a Return issued in 1908, the total of Civil List pensions payable in that year amounted to £24,665. In the financial year 2012–13 the annual cost of Civil List pensions paid to 53 people was £126,293. As of 2012, new Civil List pensions were still occasionally awarded.

== Canada ==
In Canada the civil list was a common term during the pre-confederation period; it referred to the payment for all officials on the government payroll. There was much controversy as to whether the list would be controlled by the governor or by the Legislative Assembly. The Assembly demanded control of all money matters, while the governors worried that if the Assembly was given this power, then certain positions would be delisted. Eventually under the Baldwin-Lafontaine government, a compromise was reached with Lord Elgin.

The term civil list is no longer commonly used to describe the payment of civil servants in Canada, who are covered in the budgets of executive agencies.

== Hong Kong ==
A Civil List was established on 17 August 1860 with the enactment of the Civil List Ordinance. The ordinance provided for the payment of the salaries of a list of government officials (the "civil list") from the general revenue of the colony. The list contained public officers across the executive and judicial branches of government, including the governor and the chief justice. A separate Civil Pensions Ordinance was enacted in on 3 May 1862. The Civil List Ordinance was repealed in 1890; today, the salaries of ministers, civil servants, judges, and other public officers are provided for in the annual appropriations ordinance.

The Civil and Miscellaneous Lists today refer to a regularly updated collection of lists of bodies and officers in the Civil Establishment (the executive, legislative, and judiciary) and those in statutory and non-statutory public bodies. The lists were previously published annually in print as the Staff List, Hong Kong Government.

== Morocco ==
Article 45 of the 2011 Amended Moroccan Constitution states that the King shall have a civil list. A similar provision was contained in Article 22 of the 1996 Amended Moroccan Constitution.

== New Zealand ==
The New Zealand Constitution Act 1852 (15 & 16 Vict. c. 72) (an enactment of the Parliament of the United Kingdom) granted self-government to the Colony of New Zealand and made provision for sums payable to the monarch. Various Civil List enactments were passed, repealed and replaced over the next hundred years which provided for permanent appropriations of Parliament to fund to the Governor-General, Prime Minister, Cabinet Ministers, Members of Parliament and the judiciary. The Civil List Act 1950 provided for salaries and allowances of members of Parliament to be fixed by Order in Council on the recommendation of a royal commission, where previously they had been set at intervals by legislation, and also codified the convention that a Minister of the Crown must be a member of Parliament. It was amended in 1964 to provide for an annuity for former prime ministers and the widows of former prime ministers.

The Civil List Act 1979, succeeding the 1950 act, was the final enactment of that name. It provided for a Higher Salaries Commission (now known as the Remuneration Authority), an independent salary-setting body for public offices including judges. A standalone Higher Salaries Commission Act 1977 extracted the commission from the Civil List Act. Some parts of the act were also rehomed into the Constitution Act 1986. A review of the Civil List Act 1979 was undertaken by the Law Commission from 2007 to 2010; eventually the act was repealed in two stages. The provisions relating to the Governor-General were repealed and replaced by the Governor-General Act 2010 and the remaining provisions were repealed and replaced by the Members of Parliament (Remuneration and Services) Act 2013.

== Singapore ==
The Civil List and Gratuity Act provides a civil list and gratuity for the maintenance of the President of Singapore.

== See also ==
- Privy Purse
- Prince of Wales's Children Act 1889
