= List of acts of the Parliament of Great Britain from 1727 =

This is a complete list of acts of the Parliament of Great Britain for the year 1727.

For acts passed until 1707, see the list of acts of the Parliament of England and the list of acts of the Parliament of Scotland. See also the list of acts of the Parliament of Ireland.

For acts passed from 1801 onwards, see the list of acts of the Parliament of the United Kingdom. For acts of the devolved parliaments and assemblies in the United Kingdom, see the list of acts of the Scottish Parliament, the list of acts of the Northern Ireland Assembly, and the list of acts and measures of Senedd Cymru; see also the list of acts of the Parliament of Northern Ireland.

The number shown after each act's title is its chapter number. Acts are cited using this number, preceded by the year(s) of the reign during which the relevant parliamentary session was held; thus the Union with Ireland Act 1800 is cited as "39 & 40 Geo. 3. c. 67", meaning the 67th act passed during the session that started in the 39th year of the reign of George III and which finished in the 40th year of that reign. Note that the modern convention is to use Arabic numerals in citations (thus "41 Geo. 3" rather than "41 Geo. III"). Acts of the last session of the Parliament of Great Britain and the first session of the Parliament of the United Kingdom are both cited as "41 Geo. 3".

Acts passed by the Parliament of Great Britain did not have a short title; however, some of these acts have subsequently been given a short title by acts of the Parliament of the United Kingdom (such as the Short Titles Act 1896).

Before the Acts of Parliament (Commencement) Act 1793 came into force on 8 April 1793, acts passed by the Parliament of Great Britain were deemed to have come into effect on the first day of the session in which they were passed. Because of this, the years given in the list below may in fact be the year before a particular act was passed.

== 1 Geo. 2. St. 1 ==
The sixth session of the 6th Parliament of Great Britain, which met from 27 June 1727 until 17 July 1727.

No private acts were passed in this session.

This session was also traditionally cited 1 Geo. 2, 1 Geo. 2. Stat. 1, 1 G. 2. Stat. 1, 1 G. 2, 1. G. 2. St. 1 or 1 G. 2. st. 1.

=== Public acts ===
Short title	Citation	Royal assent
Long title
Civil List Act 1727 (repealed)	1 Geo. 2. St. 1. c. 1	17 July 1727
An Act for the better Support of His Majesty's Household, and of the Honour and Dignity of the Crown of Great Britain. (Repealed by Statute Law Revision Act 1867 (30 & 31 Vict. c. 59))
South Sea Company Act 1727 (repealed)	1 Geo. 2. St. 1. c. 2	17 July 1727
An Act to enable His Majesty to be Governor of the South Sea Company. (Repealed by Statute Law Revision Act 1867 (30 & 31 Vict. c. 59))
Provision for the Queen Act 1727 (repealed)	1 Geo. 2. St. 1. c. 3	17 July 1727
An Act for enabling His Majesty to settle a Revenue, for supporting the Royal Dignity of the Queen, in case She shall survive His Majesty (Repealed by Statute Law Revision Act 1867 (30 & 31 Vict. c. 59))
Imprisonment of Certain Traitors Act 1727 (repealed)	1 Geo. 2. St. 1. c. 4	17 July 1727
An Act for continuing the Imprisonment of Robert Blackburne and others, for the horrid Conspiracy to assassinate the Person of His late Sacred Majesty King William the Third, of Glorious Memory. (Repealed by Statute Law Revision Act 1867 (30 & 31 Vict. c. 59))
Demise of the Crown Act 1727	1 Geo. 2. St. 1. c. 5	17 July 1727
An Act for altering and explaining the Acts of Parliament therein mentioned, in relation to qualifying Persons for continuing in Offices; for altering and explaining the Acts of Parliament therein mentioned, in relation to qualifying Persons for continuing in Offices; and to the Continuance of the Sheriffs of the County of Cornwall and County Palatine of Chester, and several other Offices therein mentioned, after the Demise of his late Majesty, his Heirs and Successors; and for continuing such Laws as would expire at the End of this Session of Parliament.

=== Sources ===
- Pickering, Danby, ed. (1765). "Anno primo Georgii II". The Statutes at Large. Vol. 15: From the Ninth Year of King George I to the Second Year of King George II. Cambridge: Joseph Bentham. pp. 438–452 – via Internet Archive.
- Pickering, Danby, ed. (1765). "Anno primo Georgii II". The Statutes at Large. Vol. 15: From the Ninth Year of King George I to the Second Year of King George II. Cambridge: Joseph Bentham. pp. 438–452 – via Google Books.
- Pickering, Danby, ed. (1765). "Anno primo Georgii II". The Statutes at Large. Vol. 15: From the Ninth Year of King George I to the Second Year of King George II. Cambridge: Joseph Bentham. pp. 438–452 – via Internet Archive.
- Journals of the House of Commons. Vol. 21. London: His Majesty's Stationery Office. 1803. pp. 6–14 – via Google Books.
- Chronological Table of and Index to the Statutes. Vol. 1: To the End of the Session 59 Vict. Sess. 2 (1895) (13th ed.). London: Her Majesty's Stationery Office. 1896. p. 99 – via Google Books.
- "Acts of the Parliament of Great Britain from 1727". legislation.gov.uk. The National Archives.

== 1 Geo. 2. St. 2 ==
The first session of the 7th Parliament of Great Britain, which met from 23 January 1728 until 28 May 1728.

This session was also traditionally cited 1 Geo. 2. Stat. 2, 1 G. 2. Stat. 2, 1. G. 2. St. 2 or 1 G. 2. st. 2.

=== Public acts ===
Short title	Citation	Royal assent
Long title
Taxation Act 1727 (repealed)	1 Geo. 2. St. 2. c. 1	21 February 1728
An Act for continuing the Duties upon Malt, Mum, Cyder, and Perry, in that Part of Great Britain called England; and for granting to His Majesty certain Duties upon Malt, Mum, Cyder, and Perry, in that Part of Great Britain called Scotland, for the Service of the Year One Thousand Seven Hundred and Twenty-eight; and for making good the Deficiency of a late Malt Act. (Repealed by Statute Law Revision Act 1867 (30 & 31 Vict. c. 59))
Mutiny Act 1727 (repealed)	1 Geo. 2. St. 2. c. 2	22 March 1728
An Act for punishing Mutiny and Desertion, and for the better Payment of the Army. and their Quarters. (Repealed by Statute Law Revision Act 1867 (30 & 31 Vict. c. 59))
Maidenhead and Reading, etc., Roads Act 1727 (repealed)	1 Geo. 2. St. 2. c. 3	22 March 1728
An Act for making more effectual an Act passed in the Fourth Year of the Reign of His late Majesty King George, intituled, "An Act for repairing the Highways from Maidenhead Bridge to Sunning Lane End (next to Twyford), in the Road to Reading; and from the said Bridge to Henley Bridge, (Note: Henley Bridge in Henley-on-Thames. 51°32′15″N 0°54′01″W) in the County of Berks." (Note: Maidenhead, Twyford and Henley Roads Act 1717 (4 Geo. 1. c. 6 (Pr.)) (Repealed by Roads from Maidenhead Bridge to Reading and to Henley Bridge Act 1806 (46 Geo. 3. c. cxlv) and Maidenhead, Reading and Henley Road Act 1826 (7 Geo. 4. c. lxx))
Huntingdonshire Roads Act 1727 (repealed)	1 Geo. 2. St. 2. c. 4	22 March 1728
An Act for repairing the Road leading from Chatteris Ferry, which divides the Isle of Ely from the County of Huntingdon, to Hammond's Eau; and from thence to Somersham Bridge, at Somersham Town's End, in the said County. (Repealed by Somersham Road (Huntingdonshire) Act 1820 (1 Geo. 4. c. lxxix))
Land Tax Act 1727 (repealed)	1 Geo. 2. St. 2. c. 5	17 April 1728
An Act for granting an Aid to His Majesty, by a Land Tax, to be raised in Great Britain, for the Service of the Year One Thousand Seven Hundred and Twenty-eight. (Repealed by Statute Law Revision Act 1867 (30 & 31 Vict. c. 59))
Egham and Bagshot Road Act 1727 (repealed)	1 Geo. 2. St. 2. c. 6	17 April 1728
An Act for repairing the Road from the Powder Mills on Hounslow Heath, (Note: The Gunpowder Mills were located in Bedfont on the north of the A315 Staines Road, on Hounslow Heath, to the east of the River Crane. 51°27′32″N 0°24′06″W) in the County of Middlesex, to a Place called Basingstone, (Note: The Basing Stone was located near the former Jolly Farmer public house, at the junction of the A30 and A325 roads.) near the Town of Bagshot, in the Parish of Windlesham, in the County of Surrey. (Repealed by Hounslow Heath and Egham Hill Road Act 1809 (49 Geo. 3. c. lviii) (Note: Incorrectly cited as "49 Geo. 3. c. clviii" in the Chronological Table of the Statutes.) and Egham Hill and Bagshot Road Act 1816 (56 Geo. 3. c. xviii) (Note: Incorrectly cited as "56 Geo. 3. c. cviii" in the Chronological Table of the Statutes.))
Reading Roads Act 1727 (repealed)	1 Geo. 2. St. 2. c. 7	28 May 1728
An Act for enlarging the Term granted by an Act made in the Twelfth Year of the Reign of Her late Majesty Queen Anne, (Note: Berkshire Highways Act 1713 (13 Ann. c. 28)) for repairing the Highways between The Bear Inn, (Note: The Bear Inn, Bridge Street, Reading. 51°27′11″N 0°58′23″W) in Reading, and Puntfield, (Note: Puntfield is the location of the Spring Inn, near Sulhamstead. 51°25′21″N 1°06′20″W) in the County of Berks; and for making the said Act more effectual; and for amending other Roads in this Act mentioned. (Repealed by Berkshire Roads Act 1771 (11 Geo. 3. c. 70))
Bank of England Act 1727 (repealed)	1 Geo. 2. St. 2. c. 8	28 May 1728
An Act for granting an Aid to His Majesty, by Sale of Annuities to the Bank of England, at Four Pounds per Centum, redeemable by Parliament, and charged upon the Duties on Coals and Culm; and for further applying the Produce of the Sinking Fund; and for enlarging the Time for exchanging Nevis and St. Christophers Debentures for Annuities at Three per Centum; and for applying the Arrears of His late Majesty's Civil List Revenues. (Repealed by Statute Law Revision Act 1966 (c. 5))
Taxation, etc. Act 1727 (repealed)	1 Geo. 2. St. 2. c. 9	28 May 1728
An Act for granting an Aid to His Majesty of Five Hundred Thousand Pounds, towards discharging Wages due to Seamen; and for the constant, regular, and punctual Payment of Seamen's Wages for the future; and for appropriating the Supplies granted in this present Session of Parliament; and for disposing of the Surplus of the Money granted for Half-pay for the Year One Thousand Seven Hundred and Twenty-seven. (Repealed by Statute Law Revision Act 1867 (30 & 31 Vict. c. 59))
Hockliffe, Woburn and Newport Pagnell Roads Act 1727 (repealed)	1 Geo. 2. St. 2. c. 10	28 May 1728
An Act for more effectual amending the Highway between Hockliffe and Woburn, in the County of Bedford; and for repairing the Road leading through Woburn to Tickford Bridge, in Newport Pagnell, in the County of Bucks. (Repealed by Hockliffe, Woburn and Newport Pagnell Roads Act 1800 (39 & 40 Geo. 3. c. lxvii) and Hockliffe, Woburn and Newport Pagnell Roads Act 1821 (1 & 2 Geo. 4. c. lxxxv))
Evesham Roads Act 1727 (repealed)	1 Geo. 2. St. 2. c. 11	28 May 1728
An Act for repairing and amending several Roads leading to and from the Borough of Evesham, in the County of Worcester. (Repealed by Evesham Roads Act 1822 (3 Geo. 4. c. lxix))
Rochester to Maidstone Road Act 1727 (repealed)	1 Geo. 2. St. 2. c. 12	28 May 1728
An Act for repairing and enlarging the Road leading from the House called The Sign of the Bells, in the Parish of St. Margaret in Rochester, to Maidstone, and other Roads therein mentioned, in the County of Kent. (Repealed by Kent Roads (No. 2) Act 1773 (13 Geo. 3. c. 114), Rochester and Maidstone Road Act 1821 (1 & 2 Geo. 4. c. xl) and Annual Turnpike Acts Continuance Act 1867 (30 & 31 Vict. c. 121))
Quarantine Act 1727 (repealed)	1 Geo. 2. St. 2. c. 13	28 May 1728
An Act to oblige Ships coming from Places infected more effectually to perform their Quarantine; and for the better preventing the Plague being brought from Foreign Parts into Great Britain or Ireland, or the Isles of Guernsey, Jersey, Alderney, Sark, or Man; and to hinder the spreading of Infection. (Repealed by Statute Law Revision Act 1867 (30 & 31 Vict. c. 59))
Navy Act 1727 (repealed)	1 Geo. 2. St. 2. c. 14	28 May 1728
An Act for encouraging Seamen to enter into his Majesty's Service. (Repealed by Navy Act 1757 (31 Geo. 2. c. 10) (Note: Incorrectly cited as "31 Geo. 2. c. 100" in the Chronological Table of the Statutes; that session has only 78 chapters.))
Milbank New Church Act 1727 (repealed)	1 Geo. 2. St. 2. c. 15	28 May 1728
An Act for making Provision for the Rector of the new Church situate near Milbank, in the Parish of St. Margaret, Westminster; and for other Purposes therein mentioned. (Repealed by London Government (City of Westminster) Order in Council 1901 (SR&O 1901/278))
Excise Act 1727 (repealed)	1 Geo. 2. St. 2. c. 16	28 May 1728
An Act for removing Doubts concerning the additional Duty of Two Pence per Gallon upon Low Wines and Spirits of the First Extraction, from Foreign Materials; and for obviating Questions relating to Appeals in Matters of Excise; and for appointing the Number of Commissioners of Excise, who may hear Causes depending before them. (Repealed by Statute Law Revision Act 1867 (30 & 31 Vict. c. 59))
Customs, etc. Act 1727 (repealed)	1 Geo. 2. St. 2. c. 17	28 May 1728
An Act for repealing the present Duties on Wine Lees and Lignum Vitæ, and for laying new Duties on Wine Lees; and for prohibiting the Importation of Wine in Flasks, Bottles, or small Casks; and for preventing Frauds in exporting Silk Manufactures; and for supplying the Want of regular Certificates of such Manufactures being landed in Foreign Parts, where such Certificates cannot be had; and for giving further Time to Clerks and Apprentices to pay Duties omitted to be paid for their Indentures and Contracts. (Repealed by Statute Law Revision Act 1867 (30 & 31 Vict. c. 59))
Fulham Bridge Act 1727 (repealed)	1 Geo. 2. St. 2. c. 18	28 May 1728
An Act to explain and amend an Act made in the Twelfth Year of the Reign of His late Majesty King George the First, (Note: Fulham and Putney Bridge Act 1725 (12 Geo. 1. c. 36)) for building a Bridge cross the River of Thames, from the Town of Fulham, in the County of Middlesex, to the Town of Putney, in the County of Surrey; and for making the said Act more effectual. (Repealed by Putney and Fulham Bridge Act 1863 (26 & 27 Vict. c. ccxi))
Destruction of Turnpikes, etc. Act 1727 (repealed)	1 Geo. 2. St. 2. c. 19	28 May 1728
An Act for punishing such Persons as shall wilfully and maliciously pull down or destroy Turnpikes for repairing Highways, or Locks or other Works erected by Authority of Parliament for making Rivers navigable. (Repealed by Statute Law Revision Act 1867 (30 & 31 Vict. c. 59))
Canterbury Poor Relief Act 1727 (repealed)	1 Geo. 2. St. 2. c. 20	28 May 1728
An Act for erecting a Workhouse in the City of Canterbury, for employing and maintaining the Poor there; and for better enlightening the Streets of the said City. (Repealed by Local Government Board's Provisional Orders Confirmation (Poor Law) Act 1880 (43 & 44 Vict. c. lx))
Crown Lands (Forfeited Estates) Act 1727 (repealed)	1 Geo. 2. St. 2. c. 21	28 May 1728
An Act to explain and amend an Act passed in the Thirteenth Year of His late Majesty's Reign, intituled, "An Act for Sale of such of the forfeited Estates in that Part of Great Britain called Scotland as remain unsold, and are vested in the Crown; and for determining such Claims on the said Estates as, having been duly entered, remain undetermined." (Note: Crown Lands (Forfeited Estates) Act 1726 (13 Geo. 1. c. 28)) (Repealed by Statute Law Revision Act 1948 (11 & 12 Geo. 6. c. 62))
Fund for Fire Victims in Edinburgh Act 1727 (repealed)	1 Geo. 2. St. 2. c. 22	28 May 1728
An Act to explain the Acts of the Third and Ninth Years of His late Majesty's Reign, (Note: Edinburgh Beer Duties Act 1716 (3 Geo. 1. c. 5)) (Note: Edinburgh Beer Duties Act 1722 (9 Geo. 1. c. 14)) for continuing the Duty of Two Pennies Scots on every Pint of Ale and Beer sold in the City of Edinburgh, in relation to the Payment of Petty Port Customs; and for the more effectual securing the Payment of such Money as hath been, or shall be, contributed towards a charitable Fund for Relief of such as shall suffer by Fire in the said City, and the Suburbs and Liberties thereof. (Repealed by Statute Law Revision Act 1948 (11 & 12 Geo. 6. c. 62) and Statute Law (Repeals) Act 1981 (c. 19))
Indemnity Act 1727 (repealed)	1 Geo. 2. St. 2. c. 23	28 May 1728
An Act for indemnifying Persons who have omitted to qualify themselves for Offices and Employments within the Time limited by Law, and for allowing further Time for that Purpose; and for repealing so much of Two Acts of Parliament (Note: Regency Act 1705 (4 & 5 Ann. c. 20)) (Note: Succession to the Crown Act 1707 (6 Ann. c. 41)) therein mentioned, as requires Persons to qualify themselves to continue in Offices or Employments for the Space of Six Months after the Demise of His Majesty, His Heirs or Successors. (Repealed by Statute Law Revision Act 1867 (30 & 31 Vict. c. 59))

=== Private acts ===
Short title	Citation	Royal assent
Long title
Ellison's Name Act 1727	1 Geo. 2. St. 2. c. 1 Pr.	22 March 1728
An Act to enable Robert Ellison Esquire, and the Heirs and Issue of his Body, to take and use the Surname of Carre, according to the Will of his Uncle Francis Carre Esquire, deceased.
Wesselow's Naturalization Act 1727	1 Geo. 2. St. 2. c. 2 Pr.	22 March 1728
An Act for naturalizing Abraham Wesselow.
Naturalization of Oldenburgh, Dumoustier and Others Act 1727	1 Geo. 2. St. 2. c. 3 Pr.	22 March 1728
An Act for naturalizing Adam Oldenburg, Phillipe Dumoustier, and others.
Settlement of a jointure on Countess of Shaftesbury in lieu and bar of her dower at common law.	1 Geo. 2. St. 2. c. 4 Pr.	17 April 1728
An Act to settle a Jointure on Susanna Countess of Shaftesbury, Wife of Anthony Earl of Shaftesbury, in Lieu and Bar of her Dower, or Thirds at the Common Law.
Lord Bentincke's Estate Act 1727	1 Geo. 2. St. 2. c. 5 Pr.	17 April 1728
An Act to enable the Guardians of the Lord George Bentincke, Second Son of Henry late Duke of Portland, to make Leases of certain Houses, Grounds, and Tenements, in Soho, during the Minority of the said Lord George, for making Provision for his Maintenance; and for other Purposes therein mentioned.
Davie's Estate Act 1727	1 Geo. 2. St. 2. c. 6 Pr.	17 April 1728
An Act for confirming the Partitions of the Estates late of Sir William Davie Baronet, deceased, among his Coheirs; and for settling their Shares thereof, in Severalty, to the same Uses to which their several undivided Parts thereof stood limited before the Partition.
Bromley's Estate Act 1727	1 Geo. 2. St. 2. c. 7 Pr.	17 April 1728
An Act for vesting the Estate of William Bromley Esquire and Mary his Wife, lying at Sundon, in the County of Bedford, in Trustees, to be sold, pursuant to an Agreement in their Marriage Settlement.
Crowe's Estate Act 1727	1 Geo. 2. St. 2. c. 8 Pr.	17 April 1728
An Act to enable Christopher Crowe, of Woodford Hall, in the County of Essex, Esquire, to sell, or otherwise dispose of, the Mansion-house called Woodford Hall, and all other his Lands and Hereditaments at Woodford, comprized in his Settlement thereof; he having settled other Lands and Hereditaments, in the County of York, of greater Value, to the same Uses, in Lieu thereof.
Bealing's Estate Act 1727	1 Geo. 2. St. 2. c. 9 Pr.	17 April 1728
An Act to enable the Guardians of Anna Elizabetha Bealing, an Infant about Four Years old, appointed by this Act, to grant Building Leases of her Fourth Part and Share of and in certain Messuages, Ground, and Hereditaments, in or near the Parish of St. Andrew, Holborn, in the County of Middlesex.
Wheler's Estate Act 1727	1 Geo. 2. St. 2. c. 10 Pr.	17 April 1728
An Act for vesting the Manors of Shirfield, and divers Lands and Hereditaments, in the County of Southampton, the Estate of Granville Wheler Esquire, in Trustees, discharged of the Uses in a former Settlement; he having settled an Estate in the County of Kent to the same Uses, in Lieu thereof.
Brown's Estate Act 1727	1 Geo. 2. St. 2. c. 11 Pr.	17 April 1728
An Act to enable Thomas Brown Gentleman to grant Building Leases of his Estate in the Town of Manchester, in the County of Lancaster.
Cherrington Inclosure Act 1727	1 Geo. 2. St. 2. c. 12 Pr.	17 April 1728
An Act for appointing Commissioners, to make a Division of certain Common Fields, Lands, and Wastes, in the Parish of Cherrington, in the County of Gloucester, among the Proprietors, in order to enclose the same.
Lanove's Naturalization Act 1727	1 Geo. 2. St. 2. c. 13 Pr.	17 April 1728
An Act for naturalizing John Lanove.
Grafton (Northamptonshire) Inclosure Act 1727	1 Geo. 2. St. 2. c. 14 Pr.	28 May 1728
An Act for enabling Charles Duke of Grafton, Lord of the Manor of Grafton, in the County of Northampton, to enclose the Common Fields and Waste Grounds within the said Manor, in Pursuance of several Agreements between the said Duke and the Rector and Churchwardens of the Parish of Grafton Regis; and to establish the said Agreements.
Earl of Buchan's Estate Act 1727	1 Geo. 2. St. 2. c. 15 Pr.	28 May 1728
An Act for vesting in Trustees divers Lands, in the several Counties of Berks, Bucks, Wilts, Ox ford and York, the Estate of David Earl of Buchan, for the Purposes therein mentioned.
Enabling the Treasury to compound with George Townsend, Montague Bacon, John Atwood and John Burton, late Commissioners for licensing Hawkers, Pedlars and Petty Chapmen for a debt owed to the Crown.	1 Geo. 2. St. 2. c. 16 Pr.	28 May 1728
An Act to enable the Commissioners of the Treasury, or the Lord High Treasurer, for the Time being, to compound with George Townsend, Montague Bacon, John Atwood, and John Burton, late Commissioners for licensing Hawkers, Pedlars, and Petty Chapmen, for a Debt they stand charged with to the Crown.
Enabling the Treasury to compound with Thomas Hammond and his sureties for a debt due to the Crown for customs on tobacco and wines.	1 Geo. 2. St. 2. c. 17 Pr.	28 May 1728
An Act to enable the Commissioners of the Treasury, or the Lord High Treasurer, for the Time being, to compound with Thomas Hammond, late of London, Merchant, and his Sureties, for a Debt due to the Crown, for Customs on Tobacco and Wines.
Tynte's Estate Act 1727	1 Geo. 2. St. 2. c. 18 Pr.	28 May 1728
An Act for vesting the Estate of Sir Halfwell Tynte Baronet and Dame Mary his Wife (in Right of Dame Mary) in Trustees, to be settled to the Uses in their Marriage Articles.
Wittewronge's Estate Act 1727	1 Geo. 2. St. 2. c. 19 Pr.	28 May 1728
An Act for vesting the Estate late of Sir John Wittewronge Baronet, deceased, in the County of Bucks, in Trustees, to enable them to convey the same to the most Noble Sarah Dutchess Dowager of Marlborough, the Purchaser thereof under a Decree of the High Court of Chancery.
Howard's Estate Act 1727	1 Geo. 2. St. 2. c. 20 Pr.	28 May 1728
An Act for empowering the Honourable Charles Howard Esquire to raise Money, by Sale or Mortgage of the Manors of Walden, alias Chipping Walden, Brook Walden, and other Manors and Lands therein mentioned, for Payment of the Debts of Charles William late Earl of Suffolk and Bindon, deceased.
Tilney's Estate Act 1727	1 Geo. 2. St. 2. c. 21 Pr.	28 May 1728
An Act for making more effectual a Deed of Appointment executed by Frederick Tylney Esquire (late deceased), with respect to Twenty Thousand Pounds; and for settling the same for the Purposes herein mentioned.
Scourfield Estates Act 1727	1 Geo. 2. St. 2. c. 22 Pr.	28 May 1728
An Act for vesting the Real Estates of William Scourfield the Elder Esquire, Catherine his Wife, William Scourfield the Younger Esquire and Anne his Wife, in the Counties of Pembroke and Brecon, in Trustees, to certain Uses therein mentioned.
Nugent's Relief Act 1727	1 Geo. 2. St. 2. c. 23 Pr.	28 May 1728
An Act for Relief of Hyacinthus Richard Nugent.
Discharge of an incumbrance on the lands of Donoghmore, part of the Bishopric of Cloyne.	1 Geo. 2. St. 2. c. 24 Pr.	28 May 1728
An Act for discharging an Incumbrance on the Lands of Donoghmore, Part of the Bishopric of Cloyne, in Ireland.
Vesting part of the glebe belonging to the rectory of Overstone (Northamptonshire) in Henry Stratford to enable inclosure, and other provisions.	1 Geo. 2. St. 2. c. 25 Pr.	28 May 1728
An Act for vesting Part of the Glebe Lands belonging to the Rectory of Overstone, in the County of Northampton, in Henry Stratford Esquire and his Heirs, to enable the making of Enclosures; and for other Purposes herein mentioned.
Overton, Longville and Botolph's Bridge (Huntingdonshire) Inclosure Act 1727	1 Geo. 2. St. 2. c. 26 Pr.	28 May 1728
An Act for confirming the Enclosure and Division of the Common Fields and Common Grounds, within the Manors and Parishes of Overton Longville (Note: Orton Longueville.) and Botolphs Bridge, in the County of Huntingdon.
Sheldon's Estate Act 1727	1 Geo. 2. St. 2. c. 27 Pr.	28 May 1728
An Act for Sale of Part of the Estate of Francis Sheldon Esquire, a Lunatic, for discharging the Debts and Incumbrances affecting the same.
Vesting an undivided fifth part of a leasehold estate in Crondall (Hampshire) in trustees to be sold, other estates to be purchased and settled in lieu from the proceeds.	1 Geo. 2. St. 2. c. 28 Pr.	28 May 1728
An Act for vesting an undivided Fifth Part of a Leasehold Estate, in Crondall, in the County of Southampton, in Trustees, to be sold; and, with the Money arising by the Sale thereof, to purchase One or more Estate or Estates in Possession, to be settled to the same Uses.
Fox's Estate Act 1727	1 Geo. 2. St. 2. c. 29 Pr.	28 May 1728
An Act to enable James Fox Esquire and others to make Leases of the Estate, in the County of Surrey, devised to him by Frances late Viscountess Lanesborough; and for Sale of Bridgehouse Farm, Part of the said Estate, and investing the Money in the Purchase of other Lands in the same County, to be settled to the like Uses; and for other Purposes herein mentioned.
Nicholls' Estate Act 1727	1 Geo. 2. St. 2. c. 30 Pr.	28 May 1728
An Act for Sale of Part of the Estate of John Nicholls Esquire, deceased, in the County of Cornwall, for Payment of his Debts and Legacies; and for other Purposes therein mentioned.
Delerme's Naturalization Act 1727	1 Geo. 2. St. 2. c. 31 Pr.	28 May 1728
An Act for naturalizing James Delerme.

=== Sources ===
- Pickering, Danby, ed. (1765). "Anno primo Georgii II. Stat. 2". The Statutes at Large. Vol. 15: From the Ninth Year of King George I to the Second Year of King George II. Cambridge: Joseph Bentham. pp. 453–500 – via Internet Archive.
- Pickering, Danby, ed. (1765). "Anno primo Georgii II. Stat. 2". The Statutes at Large. Vol. 15: From the Ninth Year of King George I to the Second Year of King George II. Cambridge: Joseph Bentham. pp. 453–500 – via Google Books.
- Pickering, Danby, ed. (1765). "Anno primo Georgii II. Stat. 2". The Statutes at Large. Vol. 15: From the Ninth Year of King George I to the Second Year of King George II. Cambridge: Joseph Bentham. pp. 453–500 – via Internet Archive.
- Journals of the House of Commons. Vol. 21. London: His Majesty's Stationery Office. 1803. pp. 19–183 – via Google Books.
- Chronological Table of and Index to the Statutes. Vol. 1: To the End of the Session 59 Vict. Sess. 2 (1895) (13th ed.). London: Her Majesty's Stationery Office. 1896. p. 99 – via Google Books.

== See also ==
- List of acts of the Parliament of Great Britain
