= Sovereign Grant Act 2011 =

Act of the Parliament of the United Kingdom

Sovereign Grant Act 2011 (Note: Section 17.)
- Act of Parliament
- Parliament of the United Kingdom
- Long title: An Act to make provision for the honour and dignity of the Crown and the Royal Family; make provision about allowances and pensions under the Civil List Acts of 1837 and 1953; and for connected purposes.
- Citation: 2011 c. 15
- Introduced by: Justine Greening, Economic Secretary to the Treasury (Commons); Lord Sassoon, Commercial Secretary to the Treasury (Lords)
- Territorial extent: United Kingdom

Dates
- Royal assent: 18 October 2011
- Commencement: 1 April 2012 (Note: Section 15(1).)
Other legislation
Amends	Family Law Reform Act 1969; House of Commons Disqualification Act 1975
Repeals/revokes	Civil List Audit Act 1816; Civil List Act 1937

Status: Amended

Text of statute as originally enacted

Revised text of statute as amended

The Sovereign Grant Act 2011 (c. 15) is the act of the Parliament of the United Kingdom that introduced the Sovereign Grant, the payment that is paid annually to the monarch by the government to fund the monarch's official duties. It is usually set as a percentage of annual income from the Crown Estate. The Sovereign Grant Act 2011 was the biggest reform to the finances of the British royal family since the inception of the Civil List in 1760. In addition to the Sovereign Grant, the monarch continues to receive the revenue of the Duchy of Lancaster, while the Prince of Wales receives the revenues of the Duchy of Cornwall.

== Background ==
Shortly after his accession in 1760, King George III agreed with Parliament that he was not to govern in person, and therefore was no longer entitled to income from the Crown Estate, which for 700 years had always been used for the administration of the state. Parliament passed the Civil List Act 1760 (1 Geo. 3. c. 1), which granted a fixed annual income from the Civil List. The resulting system required the annual state expenditure on the monarchy to be decided by the Treasury and presented to House of Commons. Prior to abolition, the Civil List was fixed at £7.9 million annually for the decade 2001–2010, the same amount as in 1991, with the reserve being consumed over the decade. In 2011 the Civil List was raised to £13.7 million.

There were four funding sources:

- The Civil List paid by the Exchequer
- The Grant-in-Aid for Royal Travel paid by the Department for Transport
- The Grant-in-Aid for Communications and Information paid by the Department for Culture, Media and Sport
- The Grant-in-Aid for the Maintenance of the Royal Palaces paid by the Department for Culture, Media and Sport

== Legislation ==
The Sovereign Grant Act came into force on 1 April 2012, the start of the financial year, and changed the arrangements for the funding of Queen Elizabeth II's official duties. The Act consolidated four funding sources that the monarch received into a single payment, called the Sovereign Grant. The current system is intended to be a more permanent arrangement than the previous one, which was reign-specific.

The Sovereign Grant is paid annually by HM Treasury at a value indexed as a percentage of the revenues from the Crown Estate and other revenues in the financial year two years earlier. It is based on an index percentage that was initially set at 15% and this is reviewed every five years by the Royal Trustees (the Prime Minister, the Chancellor of the Exchequer and the Keeper of the Privy Purse).

Any unspent Sovereign Grant is put into a reserve fund. The level of the Sovereign Grant is protected by law from decreasing as a result of falling Crown Estate revenues. In addition, the legislation requires that the Sovereign Grant shall not rise to such a level that the Reserve Fund becomes more than half the level of annual expenditure. Annual financial accounts are published by the Keeper of the Privy Purse and audited by the National Audit Office, making the Sovereign Grant more accountable than its predecessor. Funding to the Royal Household is treated similarly to funding for other government departments, unlike previous Civil List payments.

== Finances ==
Since its inception, the Sovereign Grant has often risen each year at a rate higher than the rate of inflation. About a third of the grant is used to tackle the backlog in property maintenance at the royal palaces. Following the 2016 review of the percentage of the Crown Estate income used to calculate the grant, it was announced that a temporary increase in the Sovereign Grant would be used to fund a £369 million refurbishment of Buckingham Palace, subject to parliamentary approval. The trustees recommended that the percentage should rise to 25% for the 10 years during which the work would take place, and that the grant should then be returned to 15% when building work is finished in 2027. This was expected to result in a 66% rise in the grant in 2017–18. The increase in the grant to 25% was approved by Parliament in March 2017. A decrease in the Crown Estate's rental income during the COVID-19 pandemic led to the first use of the provision that prevents the value of the Sovereign Grant from falling, with the Treasury committing to make up the shortfall.

After the accession of King Charles III in September 2022, the new king approved a Statutory Order in Council to allow the existing Sovereign Grant provisions to continue throughout his reign. Prior to the Sovereign Grant Act, primary legislation had been required for the continuance of the Civil List. In January 2023 the Keeper of the Privy Purse, on behalf of the King, asked the government to reduce the percentage used to calculate the sovereign grant so that the total does not include the income from new offshore wind power leases, calculated to be worth around £1 billion annually to the Crown Estate. This request was said by the King to be due to his desire that the money could instead be used for the "wider public good". In July 2023, due to the Crown Estate's sale of wind farm leases dramatically increasing the money going to the Treasury, the government announced that the grant would be 12% of the Crown Estate's net profits in the following year, down from 25%, while maintaining the same level of payment in pounds.

In July 2024 it was announced that the annual profits from the Crown Estate had risen again due to the proceeds from offshore wind projects, resulting in an annual increase of £45 million to the Sovereign Grant for 2025–26. The Keeper of the Privy Purse said the increase will be used to complete the renovation of Buckingham Palace, and that once this was accomplished: "a reduction in the absolute amount of the sovereign grant will be sought as part of the royal trustees review in 2026–27, through primary legislation".

Year	Grant (£m)	% change	sources
2012–13	31.0	—	
2013–14	36.1	+16.5%	
2014–15	37.9	+5.0%	
2015–16	40.0	+5.5%	
2016–17	42.8	+7.0%	
2017–18	76.1	+77.8%	
2018–19	82.2	+8.0%	
2019–20	82.4	±0.0%	
2020–21	85.9	+4.2%	
2021–22	86.3	+0.5%	
2022–23	86.3	±0.0%	
2023–24	86.3	±0.0%	
2024–25	86.3	±0.0%	
2025–26	132.1	+53.1%	
2026–27	137.9	+4.4%	

The King and the Prince of Wales also receive private income through the Duchy of Lancaster and Duchy of Cornwall.

The Sovereign Grant only accounts for one part of the total cost of running the monarchy. The Sovereign Grant does not cover the costs of police and military security and of armed services ceremonial duties nor does it cover the costs of royal ceremonies or local government costs for royal visits. These are generally paid by government from public tax receipts. It was estimated by the Treasury that the 10 days of mourning and state funeral of Elizabeth II in 2022 cost the government £162 million, and that the coronation of Charles III and Camilla in 2023 cost £72 million.
