= Crown Estate =

Property owned by the monarch of the United Kingdom

The Crown Estate
- Type: Statutory corporation under the Crown Estate Act 1961
- Industry: Property management
- Founded: 1760
- Founder: Parliament and George III, by the establishment of the Civil List
- Headquarters: London, England, UK
- Area served: United Kingdom (England, Northern Ireland and Wales only)
- Key people: Richard Wayne Lewis (Chairman); Dan Labbad (Chief Executive)
- Products: Property; residential; seabed management; real estate services; offices; shopping centres
- Revenue: ▲£1.590 billion (2025); ▲£1.526 billion (2024); ▲£742.6 million (2023); £490.8 million (2022)
- Net income: ▲£1.1149 billion (2025); ▲£1.101 billion (2024); ▲£442.6 million (2023); £312.7 million (2022); 88% to HM Treasury; 12% to the monarch
- Total assets: ▼£13.5 billion (2025); ▼£14.1 billion (2024); ▲£15.8 billion (2023); £15.6 billion (2022)
- Owner: Charles III (in right of The Crown)
- Website: www.thecrownestate.co.uk

The Crown Estate is a collection of lands and holdings in the United Kingdom belonging to the British monarch as a corporation sole, making it "the sovereign's public estate", which is neither government property nor part of the monarch's private estate. The Crown Estate in England, Wales, and Northern Ireland is managed by the Crown Estate Commissioners, which trades as The Crown Estate. In Scotland, the Crown Estate is managed by Crown Estate Scotland, since the Scottish estate was devolved in 2017.

The sovereign has official ownership of the estate but is not involved with its management or administration; nor does the sovereign have personal control of its affairs. For all practical purposes, the Estate Commissioners shall exercise "all such acts as belong to the Crown's rights of ownership" for the estate "on behalf of the Crown". The proceeds of the estate, in part, fund the monarchy. The estate's extensive portfolio is overseen by a semi-independent, incorporated public body headed by the Crown Estate Commissioners, who exercise "the powers of ownership" of the estate, although they are not "owners in their own right". The revenues from these hereditary possessions have been placed by the monarch at the disposition of His Majesty's Government in exchange for relief from the responsibility to fund the Civil Government. These revenues proceed directly to His Majesty's Treasury, for the benefit of the British nation; a percentage of them is then distributed back to the monarch. The Crown Estate is formally accountable to the Parliament of the United Kingdom, where it is legally mandated to provide an annual report for the sovereign, a copy of which is forwarded to the House of Commons.

The Crown Estate is one of the largest property managers in the United Kingdom, administering property worth £15.6 billion, with urban properties, valued at £9.1 billion, representing the majority of the estate by value. These include many properties in central London, but the estate also controls 7,920 km^{2} (3,060 sq mi) of agricultural land and forest and more than half of the UK's foreshore, and retains various other traditional holdings and rights, including Ascot Racecourse and Windsor Great Park. While Windsor Home Park is also part of the Crown Estate, occupied royal palaces, such as Windsor Castle itself, are not part of the Crown Estate, but are managed through the royal household. Naturally occurring gold and silver in the UK, collectively known as "Mines Royal", are managed by the Crown Estate and leased to mining operators.

Historically, Crown Estate properties were administered by the reigning monarch to help fund the business of governing the country. In 1760, George III surrendered control over the estate's revenues to the Treasury, thus relieving him of the responsibility of paying for the costs of the civil service, defence costs, the national debt, and his own personal debts. In return, he received an annual grant known as the Civil List.

By tradition, each subsequent monarch agreed to this arrangement upon his or her accession. On 1 April 2012, under the terms of the Sovereign Grant Act 2011, the Civil List was abolished and the monarch has since been provided with a stable source of revenue indexed to a percentage of the Crown Estate's annual net income. This was intended to provide a long-term solution and remove the politically sensitive issue of Parliament having to debate the Civil List allowance every ten years. Subsequently, the Sovereign Grant Act allows for all future monarchs to simply extend these provisions for their reigns by Order in Council.

King Charles III's Accession Council on 10 September 2022 "was the first to include provision for the royal finances", and in one of his first signed Orders in Council, he confirmed his willingness to surrender control of the Crown's hereditary revenues from the Crown Estate in exchange for the Sovereign Grant.

== History ==
=== Crown land in England and Wales ===
The history of the Crown lands in England and Wales begins with the Norman Conquest in 1066. By right of conquest, William I (r. 1066–1087) owned all the land in England and was able to redistribute it based on feudal principles. Tenants-in-chief received land directly from the king in return for military service. The land that the king kept for himself was called the royal demesne and divided into royal manors.

When the Domesday survey was completed in 1086, the king was still the largest single landholder, possessing over 18 percent of the landed estates in England. Between 10 and 30 percent of each county belonged to the royal demesne. The king delegated management of royal lands to his sheriffs. Each year, the sheriff paid the king a fixed sum called the "county farm" and was allowed to keep any surplus. The county farms were the largest source of royal revenue, totalling over £10,000 annually.

The size of the royal demesne fluctuated over time. The 70 years after William I died saw substantial alienation of lands, especially during the Anarchy when King Stephen and Empress Matilda attempted to buy support with land grants. Crown lands were often used as patronage to reward the king's family, friends, and servants. At the same time, the Crown lands also grew through confiscations and escheat.

The Crown lands were augmented as well as depleted over the centuries: Edward I extended his possessions into Wales, and James (VI & I) had his own Crown lands in Scotland which were ultimately combined with the Crown lands of England and Wales. The disposals outweighed the acquisitions: at the time of the Restoration in 1660, the total revenue arising from Crown lands was estimated to be £263,598 (equal to £45,825,676 today). By the end of the reign of William III (1689–1702) it was reduced to some £6,000 (equal to £1,208,430 today).

Before the reign of William III all the revenues of the kingdom were bestowed on the monarch for the general expenses of government. These revenues were of two kinds:

- the hereditary revenues, derived principally from the Crown lands, feudal rights (commuted for the hereditary excise duties in 1660), profits of the post office, with licences, etc.
- the temporary revenues derived from taxes granted to the king for a term of years or for life.

After the Glorious Revolution, Parliament retained under its own control the greater part of the temporary revenues, and relieved the sovereign of the cost of the naval and military services and the burden of the national debt. During the reigns of William III, Anne, George I and George II the sovereign remained responsible for the maintenance of the civil government and for the support of the royal household and dignity, being allowed for these purposes the hereditary revenues and certain taxes.

As the state machinery expanded, the cost of the civil government exceeded the income from the Crown lands and feudal rights; this created a personal debt for the monarch.

On George III's accession he surrendered the income from the Crown lands to Parliament, and abrogated responsibility for the cost of the civil government and the clearance of associated debts. As a result, and to avoid pecuniary embarrassment, he was granted a fixed civil list payment and the income retained from the Duchy of Lancaster. The King surrendered to parliamentary control the hereditary excise duties, post office revenues, and "the small branches" of hereditary revenue including rents of the Crown lands in England (which amounted to about £11,000, or £1,920,449 today), and was granted a civil list annuity of £800,000 (equal to £139,669,038 today) for the support of his household, subject to the payment of certain annuities to members of the royal family.

Although the King had retained large hereditary revenues, his income proved insufficient for his charged expenses because he used the privilege to reward supporters with bribes and gifts. Debts amounting to over £3 million (equal to £250,688,017 today) over the course of George's reign were paid by Parliament, and the civil list annuity was then increased from time to time.

Every succeeding sovereign down to and including Charles III renewed the arrangement made between George III and Parliament. By the 19th century the practice was recognised as "an integral part of the Constitution [which] would be difficult to abandon". Nevertheless, a review of funding arrangements for the monarchy led to the passage of the Sovereign Grant Act 2011, which according to HM Treasury, is:

A new consolidated grant rounding together the Civil List, Royal Palaces and Royal Travel grants-in-aid. It is intended that future funding will be set as a fraction of The Crown Estate revenue and paid through the annual Treasury Estimates process, and subject to full National Audit Office audit....

The Grant is to enable The Queen to discharge her duties as Head of State. i.e. it meets the central staff costs and running expenses of Her Majesty's official Household – such things as official receptions, investitures, garden parties and so on. It will also cover the maintenance of the Royal Palaces in England and the cost of travel to carry out royal engagements such as opening buildings and other royal visits....

While the amount of the Grant will be linked to the profits of the Crown Estate, those profits will continue to be paid in to the Exchequer; they are not to be hypothecated. Setting the Grant at a percentage of profits of the Crown Estate will help to put in place a durable and transparent framework.

In April 2014 it was reported that the Crown Estate was proposing to sell about 200 of its 750 rural homes in the UK, and was evicting tenants in preparation.

==== Wales ====
The Crown Estate in Wales includes the coastal seabed up to 12 nautical miles, approximately 65% of the foreshore as well as the Welsh river bed and ports and marinas. The estate also owns over 50,000 acres of Welsh upland and common land, mainly rough grazing land, and 250,000 acres of mineral deposits and the rights to gold and silver. Various offshore wind projects are part of the Crown Estate in Wales, including the proposed Awel y Môr, Erebus 100MW Test and Demonstration project, and three 100M projects (in their assessment stage). The Crown Estate announced £1.2million would be invested into the Morlais tidal stream demonstration zone, developed by Menter Môn.

The value of the Welsh Crown Estate has risen from £49.2m in 2020 to £549.1m in 2021, and then to £603m in 2022. The revenue of the Welsh Crown Estate in 2021 was £8.7m. Of the Crown Estate revenue; 75% goes to the UK Treasury whilst 25% is given to the monarch.

In Wales, there have been multiple calls for the Crown Estate in Wales to be devolved, including by Plaid Cymru, Welsh Labour and the Welsh Liberal Democrats. An opinion poll in May 2023 also showed strong support for devolving the estate in Wales with a majority of 58% of the people of Wales supporting the devolution of the Crown Estate compared to 19% who are opposed and 23% who do not know. Poll breakdown showed that all major political party voters supported devolution of the estate in Wales.

In January 2025, a UK government minister stated no discussions with the Welsh government had taken place, although by February 2025 they clarified that the Welsh government had asked for devolution. The UK government stated they view devolution not to be in "[Wales's] best interests" and expressed concerns over the impact to the energy sector, while the Welsh government says devolution would allow money raised by the estate to be spent in Wales. Eluned Morgan, First Minister and Welsh Labour leader admitted Labour is split on the issue. By 21 February 2025, a majority of Wales principal area councils supported motions advocating to devolve the Crown Estate in Wales. On 24 February 2025, the UK Government rejected calls for the Crown Estate to be devolved to Wales. By June 2025, every Welsh principal council had supported motions for devolution.

=== Crown land in Ireland ===
In 1793, George III surrendered the hereditary revenues of the Kingdom of Ireland, and was granted a civil list annuity for certain expenses of Irish civil government. Most of the Crown land by then was from forfeitures after the 1641 rebellion or the 1688–91 revolution, with some smaller older parcels remaining from earlier rebellions, the Dissolution of the Monasteries and the Norman period. Most confiscated land had been granted away again, as under the Adventurers' Act 1640 (16 Cha. 1. c. 33), Act of Settlement 1662, and the Act of Resumption 1700.

The balance which remained in Crown hands included the "undisposed lands" of the 1662 settlement (worth less than the small quit rent that a grantee would have had to pay) and the balance unsold by the trustees under the 1700 act at its 1703 time limit. The scattered Crown lands were farmed out on long leases with little regard to the collection of rent. Responsibility lay with the Quit Rent Office, which was absorbed in 1827 by the Commissioners of Woods, Forests and Land Revenues. The largest Crown estate in the 1820s was Pobble O'Keefe in Sliabh Luachra at 5,000 acres (2,000 ha).

In 1828 the lease expired, and Richard Griffith was appointed to supervise its improvement, including the foundation of the model village of Kingwilliamstown. In the early 1830s the Crown Estate resumed possession of land in Ballykilcline following the insanity of the head lessee. The occupational sub-lessees were seven years in arrears with their rent, and the result was the Ballykilcline "removals" – free emigration to the new world in 1846. There was further state-assisted emigration from overpopulated Crown estates during the Great Famine. There is evidence of Crown Estate public work schemes to employ the more distressed in improving drainage etc. In 1854 a select committee of the House of Lords concluded that the small estates in Ireland should be sold. 7,000 acres (2,800 ha) were subsequently sold for circa £25,000 (equal to £2.4 million today) at auction and £10,000 (equal to £0.96 million today) by private treaty: a major disinvestment, with reinvestment in Great Britain.

Article 11 of the 1922 Constitution of the Irish Free State provided that Crown Estate land within the Irish Free State would belong to the state, which took over administrative responsibilities on 1 April 1923. At the time of handover, quit rents totalled £23,418 (equal to £1 million today) and rent from property £1,191 (equal to £62,000 today). The estates handed over mostly comprised foreshore.

The Crown Estate in Northern Ireland in 1960 comprised "a few quit rents ... yielding yearly only £38." By 2016 it had an income of £1.4 million, from cables, pipelines and windfarms on the foreshore, and gold mining in County Tyrone. Development of the seabed below low tide is hampered by a sovereignty dispute with the Republic of Ireland.

=== Crown land in Scotland ===
It was not until 1830 that King William IV revoked the income from the Crown estates in Scotland. The hereditary land revenues of the Crown in Scotland, formerly under the management of the Barons of the Exchequer, were transferred to the Commissioners of Woods, Forests, Land Revenues, Works and Buildings and their successors under the Crown Lands (Scotland) Act 1832 (2 & 3 Will. 4. c. 112), the Crown Lands (Scotland) Act 1833 (3 & 4 Will. 4. c. 86), and the Crown Lands (Scotland) Act 1835 (5 & 6 Will. 4. c. 58). These holdings mainly comprised former ecclesiastical land (following the abolition of the episcopacy in 1689) in Caithness and Orkney, and ancient royal possession in Stirling and Edinburgh, and feudal dues.

There was virtually no urban property. Most of the present Scottish estate excepting foreshore and salmon fishing is due to inward investment, including Glenlivet Estate, the largest area of land managed by the Crown Estate in Scotland, purchased in 1937, Applegirth, Fochabers and Whitehill estates, purchased in 1963, 1937 and 1969 respectively.

After winning the 2011 Scottish election, the Scottish National Party (SNP) called for the devolution of the Crown Estate income to Scotland. In response to this demand, the Scotland Office decided against dividing up the Crown Estates. However, plans were developed to allocate some of the Crown Estate income to the Big Lottery Fund, which would then distribute funds to coastal communities. These plans were criticised by the SNP.

==== Crown Estate Scotland ====
The Scotland Act 2016 allowed the Scottish Government to take control of a portfolio of assets totalling £272 million ($339.6 million) after a devolved Scottish Crown Estate was established, including the rights to develop marine energy projects in the country. A new public body, Crown Estate Scotland (CES), was established to manage these assets. The Scotland Act 2016 allowed a transfer scheme to for devolution of powers over the management of revenue management of Scottish assets on 1 April 2017.

Prior to the handover, the Crown Estate owned a multi-million stake in Fort Kinnaird retail park in Edinburgh representing about 60% of the value of all Crown assets in Scotland. This was not passed to Crown Estates Scotland with other Scottish properties in 2016. Two years later, the Crown Estate sold its stake and used the funds to assume full ownership of the Gallagher Retail Park in Cheltenham.

== Present day ==
=== Crown Estate Act 1961 ===
Under the Crown Estate Act 1961 (9 & 10 Eliz. 2. c. 55), the Crown Estate Commissioners have a duty "while maintaining the Crown Estate as an estate in land [...] to maintain and enhance its value and the return obtained from it, but with due regard to the requirements of good management".

Section 1(5) of the act provides among other things that "The validity of transactions entered into by the Commissioners shall not be called in question on any suggestion of their not having acted in accordance with the provisions of this Act regulating the exercise of their powers, or of their having otherwise acted in excess of their authority, nor shall any person dealing with the Commissioners be concerned to inquire as to the extent of their authority or the observance of any restrictions on the exercise of their powers".

The act includes the following:

- The Crown Estate is an estate in land only, apart from cash and gilts holdings necessary for the conduct of business.
- The Crown Estate Commissioners, who comprise the main board, are approved by the monarch on the advice of the Prime Minister. They are limited to eight persons.
- The board of commissioners have a duty to:
  - maintain and enhance the capital value of the estate and its revenue income; but at the same time
  - take into account the need to observe a high standard of estate management practice.
- When selling or letting its property the Crown Estate should always seek to achieve the best consideration (i.e. price) which can reasonably be obtained in all the circumstances, but discounting any monopoly value (mainly from ownership of the foreshore and seabed).
- The Crown Estate cannot grant leases for a term of longer than 150 years.
- The Crown Estate cannot grant land options for more than ten years unless the property is re-valued when the option is exercised.
- The Crown Estate cannot borrow money.
- Donations can be made for religious or educational purposes connected with the estate or for tenants' welfare. Otherwise, charitable donations are forbidden.
- The character of the Windsor Estate (park and forest) must be preserved; no part of the estate may be sold.
- A report should be submitted to the monarch and to Parliament annually, showing the performance of the estate over the previous year.
- The Crown Estate should observe professional accounting practices and distinguish in its accounts between capital and revenue.
- Money received as a premium from a tenant on the granting of a new lease should be allocated between capital and revenue as follows:
  - where the lease is for a term of thirty years or less it must be treated as revenue;
  - for leases of more than thirty years it must be treated as capital.

In 2010 a UK Parliament Treasury Committee report on the Crown Estate, the first for twenty years, reported that

- it is "alarmed" that the Crown Estate in 2007 started investing in joint ventures such as the Gibraltar Limited Partnership, which it says is in "grave" financial difficulties. The Crown Estate owns 50% of the partnership, which owns the Fort Kinnaird retail park near Edinburgh;
- the Crown Estate has a monopoly over the marine environment, and has focused too strongly on collecting revenues rather than acting in the long-term public interest around ports and harbours;
- the quality of residential property management in the urban estate falls short. Consultation processes have lacked transparency, and the committee was "particularly concerned" that the Crown Estate had failed to consult local bodies which had rights to nominate key workers;
- some non-commercial historic properties should be reviewed with a view to transferring management to conservation bodies such as English Heritage;
- ministers should take a greater interest in the Crown Estate, because its overall management struggles to balance revenue generation with acting in the wider public interest.

Crown Estate chief executive Roger Bright said: "We welcome the Committee’s recognition that we run a successful business operation."

=== Crown Estate Act 2025 ===
Crown Estate Act 2025 (Note: Section 7(3).)
- Act of Parliament
- Parliament of the United Kingdom
- Long title: An Act to amend the Crown Estate Act 1961.
- Citation: 2025 c. 55
- Territorial extent: England and Wales; Scotland; Northern Ireland; (Note: Section 7(1).)

Dates
- Royal assent: 11 March 2025
- Commencement: 11 May 2025 (Note: Section 7(2).)
Other legislation
Amends	Crown Estate Act 1961

Status: Current legislation

Text of statute as originally enacted

Text of the Crown Estate Act 2025 as in force today (including any amendments) within the United Kingdom, from legislation.gov.uk.

The Crown Estate Act 2025 (c. 55) amended the Crown Estate Act 1961 to:

- allow the Crown Estate to borrow and invest
- require a commissioner with specific responsibilities for Wales, a commissioner with specific responsibilities for Northern Ireland and a commissioner with specific responsibilities for England

== Holdings ==
=== Urban portfolio ===
This includes the entirety of Regent Street and around half of St James's in London's West End as well as retail property across the UK in locations including Oxford, Exeter, Nottingham, Newcastle, Harlow, and Swansea.

In 2002 the Crown Estate began implementing a £1 billion investment programme to improve Regent Street's commercial, retail, and visitor facilities and public realm. In addition, it is investing £500 million in St James's, including a number of major redevelopments.

=== Rural portfolio ===
Holdings consist of around 116,000 hectares (287,000 acres) of agricultural land and forests, together with minerals and residential and commercial property.

Agricultural interests	Agricultural interests include both livestock and arable farming. Consisting of around 106,000 hectares (263,000 acres) across the UK, they also include 26,900 hectares (66,500 acres) of common land, principally in Wales.
Forestry	Around 10,000 hectares (24,700 acres) of forestry
Minerals	Rights to extract minerals covers some 115,500 hectares (285,500 acres). Actual operations include 34 lettings, extracting sand, gravel, limestone, granite, brick clay, coal, slate and dimension stone.

=== Windsor Estate ===
The Windsor Estate covers approximately 6,300 hectares and includes Windsor Great Park, the Home Park of Windsor Castle, extensive forests, residential and commercial properties, golf courses, a racecourse and let farms.

Commercial and residential	Offices, retail and hotel	250 hectares
Leisure	Golf clubs and Ascot Racecourse	250 hectares
Agriculture	Farms	1,200 hectares
Parkland	Home Park and Great Park	1,600 hectares
Forestry	Woodland areas	3,100 hectares

=== Marine holdings ===
The Crown Estate's marine holdings consist of:

Foreshore	Approximately 55% of the UK's foreshore is owned by the Crown Estate; other owners of UK foreshore include the Duchy of Cornwall and the Duchy of Lancaster. In Orkney and Shetland, the Crown does not claim ownership of foreshore.
Territorial seabed	The Crown Estate owns virtually all of the UK's seabed from mean low water to the 12-nautical-mile (22 km) limit.
Continental shelf and extraterritorial rights	Sovereign rights of the UK in the seabed and its resources vested by the Continental Shelf Act 1964 (sub-soil and substrata below the surface of the seabed, but excluding oil, gas and coal), the Energy Acts 2004 (renewable energy) and 2008 (gas and carbon storage).

The Crown Estate plays a major role in the development of the offshore wind energy industry in the UK. Other commercial activity managed by the Crown Estate on the seabed includes wave and tidal energy, carbon capture and storage, aggregates, submarine cables and pipelines and the mining of potash. In terms of the foreshore, the Crown Estate issue licences or leases for around 850 aquaculture sites and owns marina space for approximately 18,000 moorings. As of 2020, marine holdings had a value of £4.1 billion.

=== Other rights and interests ===
Other rights and interests include:

Shopping centres	Crowngate Shopping Centre, Worcester.; Westgate Oxford and Princesshay in Exeter in a 50:50 joint venture with Landsec.; Rushden Lakes in Northamptonshire; A 5% share in the Lend Lease Retail Partnership which has an equity interest in the Bluewater Shopping Centre in Kent and Touchwood, Solihull.
Retail parks	Crown Point Shopping Park in Leeds; MK1 Shopping Park in Milton Keynes; Silverlink Shopping Park in North Tyneside; Aintree Shopping Park in Merseyside; Altrincham Retail Park in Trafford; Bath Road Shopping Park in Slough; Ocean Retail Park in Portsmouth; Queensgate Centre in Harlow; South Aylesford Retail Park in Maidstone; Apsley Mills Retail Park in Hemel Hempstead; Victoria Retail Park in Nottingham; Morfa Shopping Park in Swansea; Coliseum Retail Park in Cheshire Oaks, Ellesmere Port has been bought for £81m; Cheltenham's Gallagher Retail Park and Warwick's Leamington Shopping Park are owned 50/50 through "The Gibraltar Limited Partnership" with The Hercules Unit Trust, a Jersey-based property unit trust. The estate recently purchased the new Rushden Lakes site in Northamptonshire from its developers.
Retail and office buildings	Princes Street, London W1B (near Oxford Circus) with a 66.67% interest.
Savoy Estate apportionment	Right to receive 23% of the income from the Duchy of Lancaster's Savoy Estate in London.
Native mussels and oysters in Scotland	Wild crustaceans (does not include cultivated crustaceans)
Reversionary and contingent interests	Some properties are sold by the Crown Estate for public benefit (such as educational or religious use) with a reverter clause, which means ownership may revert to the Crown Estate in the event of a change of use. Hereditary properties of the monarch currently in government use will revert to the Crown Estate in the event of the government use ceasing.
Escheated land	Land that has no owner other than the Crown as lord paramount of the whole soil of the country. Escheat can result from bankruptcy or the dissolution of companies. Freehold land owned by dissolved companies which were registered in England or Wales are dealt with by the Treasury Solicitor as bona vacantia.
Licences and right granted at nil rent	Includes: water mains; cables; substations; war memorials

=== Finances ===
In the 2021/2022 fiscal year, the Crown Estate's property evaluation was £15.6 billion with a £312.7 million net revenue profit, which is paid into the Consolidated Fund of the UK government.

== Governance ==
=== Historical ===
Previous officials responsible for managing what is now the Crown Estate were:

- Surveyor General of Woods, Forests, Parks, and Chases and Surveyor General of the Land Revenues of the Crown, 17th century to 1810
- Commissioners of Woods, Forests and Land Revenues, 1810–1831
- Commissioners of Woods, Forests, Land Revenues, Works and Buildings, 1832–1850
- Commissioners of Woods, Forests and Land Revenues, 1851–1924
- Commissioners of Crown Lands, 1924–1954

=== Chairmen and chief executives of the Crown Estate Commissioners ===
Chairmen (First Commissioner)

- 1955–62 – Sir Malcolm Trustram Eve (later Lord Silsoe) (1894–1976)
- 1962–77 – John Drummond, 8th Earl of Perth (1907–2002)
- 1977–80 – George Thomson, Baron Thomson of Monifieth (1921–2008)
- 1980–85 – Robert Lindsay, 29th Earl of Crawford (1927–2023)
- 1985–95 – William Murray, 8th Earl of Mansfield and Mansfield (1930–2015)
- 1995–2002 – Sir Denys Henderson (1932–2016)
- 2002–2009 – Sir Ian David Grant (1943–2022)
- 2010–2016 – Sir Stuart Hampson (born 1947)
- 2016–2025 Sir Robin Budenberg (born 1959)
- 2025 – Richard Wayne Lewis

Chief executives (Second Commissioner)

- 1955–60 – Sir Ronald Montague Joseph Harris (1913–1995)
- 1960–68 – Sir Jack Alexander Sutherland-Harris (1908–1986)
- 1968–78 – Sir William Alan Wood (1916–2010)
- 1978–83 – Sir John Michael Moore (1921–2016)
- 1983–89 – Dr Keith Dexter (1928–1989)
- 1989-2001 – Sir Christopher Howes (born 1942)
- 2001–2011 – Roger Martin Francis Bright (born 1951)
- 2012–2019 – Dame Alison Nimmo (born 1964)
- 2019 – Dan Labbad

The chairman (formally titled "first commissioner") is part-time. The chief executive (the "second commissioner") is the only full-time executive member of the Crown Estate's board.

== See also ==
- Balmoral Castle
- Crown Estate Paving Commission
- Crown Estate Scotland
- Duchy of Cornwall
- Duchy of Lancaster
- Prince's Coverts – Area of managed woodland in Oxshott, Surrey
- Regent Street
- Sandringham House
- Windsor Great Park
- Patrimonio Nacional

== Bibliography ==
- Annual Reports of Commissioners of Woods and Forests 1811, 1853 and 1855
- Bartlett, Robert (2000). England Under the Norman and Angevin Kings, 1075-1225. New Oxford History of England. Clarendon Press. ISBN 9780199251018.
- Best, G. Percival (March 1901). "The Civil List and the Hereditary Revenues of the Crown" (PDF). The Fortnightly Review. Archived (PDF) from the original on 12 June 2023.
- Commissioners of Woods, Forests and Land Revenues (1792). "Part 1". Twelfth Report of the Commissioners appointed to Enquire into the State and Conditions of Woods, Forests, and Land Revenues of the Crown (PDF). Archived from the original (PDF) on 15 June 2011.
- Crown Estate, Annual report and accounts 2009. Retrieved July 2009
- Huscroft, Richard (2016). Ruling England, 1042–1217 (2nd ed.). Routledge. ISBN 978-1138786554.
- Pugh, R. B. (1960), The Crown Estate: An Historical Essay (PDF), The Crown Estate, archived from the original (PDF) on 9 April 2011
