= Civil List Act 1760 =

Act of the Parliament of Great Britain

- Act of Parliament
- Parliament of Great Britain
- Long title: An Act for the Support of his Majesty's Household, and of the Honour and Dignity of the Crown of Great Britain.
- Citation: 1 Geo. 3. c. 1
- Territorial extent: Great Britain

Dates
- Royal assent: 9 December 1760
- Commencement: 26 October 1760 (Note: Start of session.)
- Repealed: 15 July 1867
Other legislation
Repealed by	Statute Law Revision Act 1867
Relates to	Civil List Act 1697; Civil List Act 1714; Civil List Act 1727

Status: Repealed

Text of statute as originally enacted

The Civil List Act 1760 (1 Geo. 3. c. 1) was an act of the Parliament of Great Britain passed upon the accession of George III.

The act transferred almost all civil list revenues (mainly customs and excise) to Parliament. In the last year of George II's reign these had been worth £876,988. In return, the new king received a fixed, annual civil list of £800,000. Under George II the economy had grown and consequently the revenues increased. The fixed amount George III received was therefore a reduction in the Civil List.

If the previous arrangement had been retained, George III's civil list in 1777 would have been more than £1,000,000 and would have amounted to £1,812,308 in 1798. The £800,000 stipulated in the act was soon found to be inadequate and a civil list crisis was only averted in the early 1760s because George II had built up savings worth £172,000 that George III was able to draw on. By the end of the decade the civil list arrears amounted to more than half a million pounds and the king had to apply to Parliament to pay it off.

== Subsequent developments ==
The whole act was repealed by section 1 of, and the schedule to, the Statute Law Revision Act 1867 (30 & 31 Vict. c. 59).

== Bibliography ==
- Reitan, E. A. (1966). "The Civil List in Eighteenth-Century British Politics: Parliamentary Supremacy versus the Independence of the Crown". The Historical Journal. 9 (3). Cambridge University Press: 318-337. JSTOR 2637984.
