= List of acts of the Parliament of the United Kingdom from 1894 =

This is a complete list of acts of the Parliament of the United Kingdom for the year 1894.

Note that the first parliament of the United Kingdom was held in 1801; parliaments between 1707 and 1800 were either parliaments of Great Britain or of Ireland). For acts passed up until 1707, see the list of acts of the Parliament of England and the list of acts of the Parliament of Scotland. For acts passed from 1707 to 1800, see the list of acts of the Parliament of Great Britain. See also the list of acts of the Parliament of Ireland.

For acts of the devolved parliaments and assemblies in the United Kingdom, see the list of acts of the Scottish Parliament, the list of acts of the Northern Ireland Assembly, and the list of acts and measures of Senedd Cymru; see also the list of acts of the Parliament of Northern Ireland.

The number shown after each act's title is its chapter number. Acts passed before 1963 are cited using this number, preceded by the year(s) of the reign during which the relevant parliamentary session was held; thus the Union with Ireland Act 1800 is cited as "39 & 40 Geo. 3 c. 67", meaning the 67th act passed during the session that started in the 39th year of the reign of George III and which finished in the 40th year of that reign. Note that the modern convention is to use Arabic numerals in citations (thus "41 Geo. 3" rather than "41 Geo. III"). Acts of the last session of the Parliament of Great Britain and the first session of the Parliament of the United Kingdom are both cited as "41 Geo. 3". Acts passed from 1963 onwards are simply cited by calendar year and chapter number.

All modern acts have a short title, e.g. the Local Government Act 2003. Some earlier acts also have a short title given to them by later acts, such as by the Short Titles Act 1896.

== 56 & 57 Vict. ==
Continuing the second session of the 25th Parliament of the United Kingdom, which met from 31 January 1893 until 5 March 1894.

=== Public general acts ===
Short title	Citation	Royal assent
Long title
Sale of Goods Act 1893 (Note: Although the short title is dated 1893, this act was passed in 1894.) (repealed)	56 & 57 Vict. c. 71	20 February 1894
An Act for codifying the Law relating to the Sale of Goods. (Repealed by Sale of Goods Act 1979 (1979 c. 54) and Senior Courts Act 1981 (c. 54))
Colonial Acts Confirmation Act 1894 (repealed)	56 & 57 Vict. c. 72	20 February 1894
An Act to confirm certain Acts of Colonial Legislatures. (Repealed by Statute Law (Repeals) Act 1989 (c. 43))
Local Government Act 1894	56 & 57 Vict. c. 73	5 March 1894
An Act to make further provision for Local Government in England and Wales. (Repealed for Northern Ireland by Local Government Act (Northern Ireland) 1972 (c. 9 (N.I.)))

=== Sources ===
- The Public General Statutes, Volume 30: 56 & 57 Victoria – 1893-4. 5 March 1894 – via Internet Archive.

== 57 & 58 Vict. ==
The third session of the 25th Parliament of the United Kingdom, which met from 12 March 1894 until 25 August 1894.

=== Public general acts ===
Short title	Citation	Royal assent
Long title
Consolidated Fund (No. 1) Act 1894 (repealed)	57 & 58 Vict. c. 1	29 March 1894
An Act to apply certain sums out of the Consolidated Fund to the service of the years ending on the thirty-first day of March one thousand eight hundred and ninety-three, one thousand eight hundred and ninety-four, and one thousand eight hundred and ninety-five. (Repealed by Statute Law Revision Act 1908 (8 Edw. 7. c. 49))
Behring Sea Award Act 1894 (repealed)	57 & 58 Vict. c. 2	23 April 1894
An Act to provide; for carrying into effect the Award of the Tribunal of Arbitration constituted under a Treaty between Her Majesty the Queen and the United States of America. (Repealed by Marine and Coastal Access Act 2009 (c. 23))
Army (Annual) Act 1894 (repealed)	57 & 58 Vict. c. 3	23 April 1894
An Act to provide, during twelve months, for the Discipline and Regulation of the Army. (Repealed by Statute Law Revision Act 1908 (8 Edw. 7. c. 49), Statute Law Revision Act 1950 (14 Geo. 6. c. 6) and Revision of the Army and Air Force Acts (Transitional Provisions) Act 1955 (3 & 4 Eliz. 2. c. 20))
Four Courts Library Act 1894	57 & 58 Vict. c. 4	1 June 1894
An Act to authorise an advance out of the general fund of monies belonging to the Suitors of the Supreme Court in Ireland for the purposes of the Library used by the Bar of Ireland at the Four Courts, Dublin.
County Councils Association (Scotland) Expenses Act 1894 (repealed)	57 & 58 Vict. c. 5	1 June 1894
An Act to provide for the Establishment of a County Councils Association in Scotland, and to enable County Councils to contribute to the Expenses of the Association. (Repealed by Association of County Councils (Scotland) Act 1946 (9 & 10 Geo. 6. c. 77))
Quarter Sessions Act 1894 (repealed)	57 & 58 Vict. c. 6	1 June 1894
An Act for amending the Law with respect to the Time for holding Quarter Sessions. (Repealed by Assizes and Quarter Sessions Act 1908 (8 Edw. 7. c. 41))
Consolidated Fund (No. 2) Act 1894 (repealed)	57 & 58 Vict. c. 7	1 June 1894
An Act to apply a sum out of the Consolidated Fund to the service of the year ending on the thirty-first day of March one thousand eight hundred and ninety-five. (Repealed by Statute Law Revision Act 1908 (8 Edw. 7. c. 49))
Industrial and Provident Societies Act 1894 (repealed)	57 & 58 Vict. c. 8	18 June 1894
An Act to amend the Industrial and Provident Societies Act, 1893, (Note: Industrial and Provident Societies Act 1893 (56 & 57 Vict. c. 39)) in so far as it relates to the Island of Jersey. (Repealed by Industrial and Provident Societies Act 1965 (c. 12))
Solicitors Act 1894 (repealed)	57 & 58 Vict. c. 9	18 June 1894
An Act to amend the provisions of the Solicitors Act, 1877, (Note: Solicitors Act 1877 (40 & 41 Vict. c. 25)) relating to the Examination of Persons applying to be admitted Solicitors of the Supreme Court in England. (Repealed by Solicitors Act 1932 (22 & 23 Geo. 5. c. 37))
Trustee Act 1893, Amendment Act 1894 (repealed)	57 & 58 Vict. c. 10	18 June 1894
An Act to amend the Trustee Act, 1893. (Note: Trustee Act 1893 (56 & 57 Vict. c. 53)) (Repealed for England and Wales by Trustee Act 1925 (15 & 16 Geo. 5. c. 19) and for Northern Ireland by Statute Law Revision (Northern Ireland) Act 1980 (c. 59))
Public Works Loans Act 1894 (repealed)	57 & 58 Vict. c. 11	18 June 1894
An Act to grant Money for the purpose of certain Local Loans, and for other purposes relating to Local Loans. (Repealed by National Loans Act 1968 (c. 13))
Indian Railways Act 1894 (repealed)	57 & 58 Vict. c. 12	3 July 1894
An Act to enable Indian Railway Companies to pay Interest out of Capital during construction. (Repealed by Statute Law Revision Act 1966 (c. 5))
Arbitration (Scotland) Act 1894	57 & 58 Vict. c. 13	3 July 1894
An Act to amend the Law of Arbitration in Scotland. (Repealed by Arbitration (Scotland) Act 2010 (asp 1))
Fishery Board (Scotland) Extension of Powers Act 1894 (repealed)	57 & 58 Vict. c. 14	3 July 1894
An Act to extend the powers of the Fishery Board for Scotland in relation to Harbours and Piers. (Repealed by Fisheries Act 1955 (3 & 4 Eliz. 2. c. 7))
Music and Dancing Licences (Middlesex) Act 1894 (repealed)	57 & 58 Vict. c. 15	3 July 1894
An Act to amend the Law as regards Music and Dancing Licences in Middlesex. (Repealed by Middlesex County Council Act 1944 (7 & 8 Geo. 6. c. xxi))
Supreme Court of Judicature (Procedure) Act 1894 (repealed)	57 & 58 Vict. c. 16	3 July 1894
An Act to amend the Supreme Court of Judicature Acts. (Repealed by Supreme Court of Judicature (Consolidation) Act 1925 (15 & 16 Geo. 5. c. 49))
Colonial Officers (Leave of Absence) Act 1894 (repealed)	57 & 58 Vict. c. 17	3 July 1894
An Act to regulate the Conditions as to Leave of Absence for certain Colonial Officers. (Repealed by Statute Law (Repeals) Act 1973 (c. 39))
Burgh Police (Scotland) Act 1892 Amendment Act 1894 (repealed)	57 & 58 Vict. c. 18	20 July 1894
An Act to amend the Burgh Police (Scotland) Act, 1892. (Note: Burgh Police (Scotland) Act 1892 (55 & 56 Vict. c. 55)) (Repealed by Town Councils (Scotland) Act 1900 (63 & 64 Vict. c. 49))
Merchandise Marks (Prosecutions) Act 1894 (repealed)	57 & 58 Vict. c. 19	20 July 1894
An Act for enabling the Board of Agriculture to undertake Prosecutions in certain cases under the Merchandise Marks Act, 1887. (Note: Merchandise Marks Act 1887 (50 & 51 Vict. c. 28)) (Repealed by Trade Descriptions Act 1968 (c. 29))
Public Libraries (Scotland) Act 1894 (repealed)	57 & 58 Vict. c. 20	20 July 1894
An Act to amend the Public Libraries Consolidation (Scotland) Act, 1887. (Note: Public Libraries Consolidation (Scotland) Act 1887 (50 & 51 Vict. c. 42)) (Repealed by Local Government (Scotland) Act 1973 (c. 65))
Bishopric of Bristol Amendment Act 1894 (repealed)	57 & 58 Vict. c. 21	20 July 1894
An Act to amend the Bishopric of Bristol Act, 1884. (Note: Bishopric of Bristol Act 1884 (47 & 48 Vict. c. 66)) (Repealed by Statute Law (Repeals) Act 1973 (c. 39))
Injured Animals Act 1894 (repealed)	57 & 58 Vict. c. 22	20 July 1894
An Act to enable police constables to cause horses and certain other animals when mortally or seriously injured to be slaughtered. (Repealed by Injured Animals Act 1907 (7 Edw. 7. c. 5))
Commissioners of Works Act 1894	57 & 58 Vict. c. 23	20 July 1894
An Act to amend the Commissioners of Works Act, 1852, (Note: Commissioners of Works Act 1852 (15 & 16 Vict. c. 28)) and for other purposes relating to the Commissioners of Works.
Wild Birds Protection Act 1894 (repealed)	57 & 58 Vict. c. 24	20 July 1894
An Act to amend the Wild Birds Protection Act, 1880. (Note: Wild Birds Protection Act 1880 (43 & 44 Vict. c. 35)) (Repealed by Protection of Birds Act 1954 (2 & 3 Eliz. 2. c. 30))
Outdoor Relief Friendly Societies Act 1894 (repealed)	57 & 58 Vict. c. 25	20 July 1894
An Act to empower Boards of Guardians to grant Relief to Members of Friendly Societies in Receipt of any Allowances from the same. (Repealed by Poor Law Act 1927 (17 & 18 Geo. 5. c. 14))
Sea Fisheries (Shell Fish) Regulation Act 1894 (repealed)	57 & 58 Vict. c. 26	20 July 1894
An Act to extend the Powers of Local Fisheries Committees with respect to Fisheries for Shell Fish. (Repealed by Sea Fisheries Regulation Act 1966 (c. 38))
Prevention of Cruelty to Children (Amendment) Act 1894 (repealed)	57 & 58 Vict. c. 27	20 July 1894
An Act to amend the Law for the Prevention of Cruelty to Children. (Repealed by Prevention of Cruelty to Children Act 1894 (57 & 58 Vict. c. 41))
Notice of Accidents Act 1894	57 & 58 Vict. c. 28	20 July 1894
An Act for providing for notice of and inquiry into Accidents occurring in certain Employments and Industries. (Repealed for England and Wales and Scotland by Transport and Works Act 1992 (c. 42))
Consolidated Fund (No. 3) Act 1894 (repealed)	57 & 58 Vict. c. 29	31 July 1894
An Act to apply a sum out of the Consolidated Fund to the service of the year ending on the thirty-first day of March one thousand eight hundred and ninety-five. (Repealed by Statute Law Revision Act 1908 (8 Edw. 7. c. 49))
Finance Act 1894 (repealed)	57 & 58 Vict. c. 30	31 July 1894
An Act to grant certain Duties of Customs and Inland Revenue, to alter other Duties, and to amend the Law relating to Customs and Inland Revenue, and to make other provision for the financial arrangements of the year. (Repealed for England and Wales and Scotland by Finance Act 1896 (59 & 60 Vict. c. 28), Statute Law Revision Act 1908 (8 Edw. 7. c. 49), Finance (1909-10) Act 1910 (10 Edw. 7 & 1 Geo. 5. c. 8), Finance Act 1914 (4 & 5 Geo. 5. c. 10), Income Tax Act 1918 (8 & 9 Geo. 5. c. 40), Local Government Act 1929 (19 & 20 Geo. 5. c. 17), Local Government (Scotland) Act 1929 (19 & 20 Geo. 5. c. 25), Finance Act 1949 (12, 13 & 14 Geo. 6. c. 47), Statute Law Revision Act 1950 (14 Geo. 6. c. 6), Finance Act 1952 (15 & 16 Geo. 6 & 1 Eliz. 2. c. 33), Small Estates (Representation) Act 1961 (9 & 10 Eliz. 2. c. 37), Finance Act 1962 (10 & 11 Eliz. 2. c. 44), Finance Act 1963 (c. 25), Finance Act 1969 (c. 32), Finance Act 1970 (c. 24), Administration of Estates Act 1971 (c. 25) (Note: Incorrectly cited as "Administration of Justice Act 1971" in the Chronological Table of the Statutes.) and Finance Act 1975 (c. 7), for England and Wales by Administration of Justice (Miscellaneous Provisions) Act 1933 (23 & 24 Geo. 5. c. 36) and for Northern Ireland by Northern Ireland (Crown Proceedings) Order 1949 (SI 1949/1836) and Northern Ireland Act 1962 (c. 30))
Zanzibar Indemnity Act 1894 (repealed)	57 & 58 Vict. c. 31	31 July 1894
An Act for authorising the Treasury to indemnify the Bank of England with respect to the Transfer of Consolidated Bank Annuities standing in the name of the late Sultan of Zanzibar. (Repealed by Statute Law Revision Act 1950 (14 Geo. 6. c. 6))
Registration Acceleration Act 1894 (repealed)	57 & 58 Vict. c. 32	31 July 1894
An Act to accelerate the Registration of Parochial Electors in England and Wales in the present year. (Repealed by Statute Law Revision Act 1908 (8 Edw. 7. c. 49))
Industrial Schools Acts Amendment Act 1894 (repealed)	57 & 58 Vict. c. 33	17 August 1894
An Act to further amend the Industrial Schools Act, 1866. (Note: Industrial Schools Act 1866 (29 & 30 Vict. c. 118)) (Repealed by Children Act 1908 (8 Edw. 7. c. 67))
British Museum (Purchase of Land) Act 1894	57 & 58 Vict. c. 34	17 August 1894
An Act to provide for the purchase of certain Lands belonging to the Duke of Bedford by the Trustees of the British Museum.
Charitable Trusts (Places of Religious Worship) Amendment Act 1894 (repealed)	57 & 58 Vict. c. 35	17 August 1894
An Act to amend the Charitable Trusts Acts. (Repealed by Charities Act 1960 (8 & 9 Eliz. 2. c. 58))
Valuation of Lands (Scotland) Acts Amendment Act 1894 (repealed)	57 & 58 Vict. c. 36	17 August 1894
An Act to amend the Valuation of Lands (Scotland) Acts in regard to the duties of the Assessor of Railways and Canals. (Repealed by Local Government and Rating Act 1997 (c. 29))
Locomotive Threshing Engines Act 1894	57 & 58 Vict. c. 37	17 August 1894
An Act for removal of the Restrictions on the use of Locomotive Engines for Threshing purposes. (Repealed for England and Wales and Scotland by Road Traffic Act 1930 (20 & 21 Geo. 5. c. 43))
Public Libraries (Ireland) Act 1894 (repealed)	57 & 58 Vict. c. 38	17 August 1894
An Act to amend the Public Libraries (Ireland) Acts. (Repealed by Museums (Northern Ireland) Order 1981 (SI 1981/438))
Prize Courts Act 1894	57 & 58 Vict. c. 39	17 August 1894
An Act to make further provision for the establishment of Prize Courts, and for other purposes connected therewith.
Nautical Assessors (Scotland) Act 1894	57 & 58 Vict. c. 40	17 August 1894
An Act to provide for the attendance of Assessors at the trial and hearing of Maritime Causes in the Court of Session and Sheriff Courts in Scotland, and in Appeals to the House of Lords.
Prevention of Cruelty to Children Act 1894 (repealed)	57 & 58 Vict. c. 41	17 August 1894
An Act to consolidate the Acts relating to the Prevention of Cruelty to, and Protection of, Children. (Repealed by Prevention of Cruelty to Children Act 1904 (4 Edw. 7. c. 15))
Quarries Act 1894 (repealed)	57 & 58 Vict. c. 42	25 August 1894
An Act to provide for the better Regulation of Quarries. (Repealed for Northern Ireland by Quarries Act (Northern Ireland) 1927 (c. 19 (N.I.)), for England and Wales and Scotland by Mines and Quarries Act 1954 (2 & 3 Eliz. 2. c. 70) and for the Isle of Man by Isle of Man Act 1958 (6 & 7 Eliz. 2. c. 11))
Crown Lands Act 1894	57 & 58 Vict. c. 43	25 August 1894
An Act to amend the Law relating to the Management of the Woods, Forests, and Land Revenues of the Crown.
Heritable Securities (Scotland) Act 1894	57 & 58 Vict. c. 44	25 August 1894
An Act to amend the Law relating to Heritable Securities in Scotland.
Uniforms Act 1894	57 & 58 Vict. c. 45	25 August 1894
An Act to regulate and restrict the wearing of Naval and Military Uniforms.
Copyhold Act 1894 (repealed)	57 & 58 Vict. c. 46	25 August 1894
An Act to consolidate the Copyhold Acts. (Repealed by Statute Law (Repeals) Act 1969 (c. 52))
Building Societies Act 1894	57 & 58 Vict. c. 47	25 August 1894
An Act to amend the Building Societies Acts. (Repealed for Northern Ireland by Building Societies Act (Northern Ireland) 1967 (c. 31 (N.I.)))
Expiring Laws Continuance Act 1894 (repealed)	57 & 58 Vict. c. 48	25 August 1894
An Act to continue various Expiring Laws. (Repealed by Statute Law Revision Act 1908 (8 Edw. 7. c. 49))
Jurors (Ireland) Amendment Act 1894 (repealed)	57 & 58 Vict. c. 49	25 August 1894
An Act to amend the Juries (Ireland) Acts. (Repealed by Statute Law Revision Act 1908 (8 Edw. 7. c. 49) and Juries Act (Northern Ireland) 1953 (c. 19 (N.I.)))
Congested Districts Board (Ireland) Act 1894 (repealed)	57 & 58 Vict. c. 50	25 August 1894
An Act to make further provision with respect to the Congested Districts Board for Ireland. (Repealed by Statute Law Revision Act 1908 (8 Edw. 7. c. 49) and Statute Law Revision Act 1950 (14 Geo. 6. c. 6))
Chimney Sweepers Act 1894 (repealed)	57 & 58 Vict. c. 51	25 August 1894
An Act to make better provision for the Regulation of Chimney Sweepers. (Repealed for England and Wales by Chimney Sweepers Acts (Repeal) Act 1938 (1 & 2 Geo. 6. c. 58) and for Northern Ireland by Statute Law (Repeals) Act 1971 (c. 52))
Coal Mines (Check Weigher) Act 1894 (repealed)	57 & 58 Vict. c. 52	25 August 1894
An Act to amend the Provisions of the Coal Mines Regulation Act, 1887, (Note: Coal Mines Regulation Act 1887 (50 & 51 Vict. c. 58)) with respect to Check Weighers. (Repealed by Wages Act 1986 (c. 48) (Note: Incorrectly cited as "Wages Act 1985" in the Chronological Table of the Statutes.))
London (Equalisation of Rates) Act 1894 (repealed)	57 & 58 Vict. c. 53	25 August 1894
An Act to make better provision for the Equalisation of Rates as between the different parts of London. (Repealed by Local Government Act 1929 (19 & 20 Geo. 5. c. 17))
Railway and Canal Traffic Act 1894	57 & 58 Vict. c. 54	25 August 1894
An Act to amend the Railway and Canal Traffic Act, 1888. (Note: Railway and Canal Traffic Act 1888 (51 & 52 Vict. c. 25)) (Repealed for England and Wales and Scotland by Railways Act 1921 (11 & 12 Geo. 5. c. 55), Railway and Canal Commission (Abolition) Act 1949 (12, 13 & 14 Geo. 6. c. 11) and Transport Charges &c. (Miscellaneous Provisions) Act 1954 (2 & 3 Eliz. 2. c. 64))
Housing of the Working Classes Act 1894 (repealed)	57 & 58 Vict. c. 55	25 August 1894
An Act to explain the provisions of Part II. of the Housing of the Working Classes Act, 1890, (Note: Housing of the Working Classes Act 1890 (53 & 54 Vict. c. 70)) with respect to powers of borrowing. (Repealed for England and Wales by Housing Act 1925 (15 & 16 Geo. 5. c. 14), for Scotland by Housing (Scotland) Act 1925 (15 & 16 Geo. 5. c. 15) and for Northern Ireland by Statute Law Revision Act (Northern Ireland) 1954 (c. 35 (N.I.)))
Statute Law Revision Act 1894 (repealed)	57 & 58 Vict. c. 56	25 August 1894
An Act for further promoting the Revision of the Statute Law by repealing Enactments which have ceased to be in force or have become unnecessary. (Repealed by Statute Law (Repeals) Act 1993 (c. 50))
Diseases of Animals Act 1894 (repealed)	57 & 58 Vict. c. 57	25 August 1894
An Act to consolidate the Contagious Diseases (Animals) Acts, 1878 to 1893. (Repealed for England and Wales and Scotland by Diseases of Animals Act 1950 (14 Geo. 6. c. 36) and for Northern Ireland by Diseases of Animals Act 1896 (59 & 60 Vict. c. 15), Agriculture and Technical Instruction (Ireland) Act 1899 (62 & 63 Vict. c. 50), Statute Law Revision Act 1908 (8 Edw. 7. c. 49), Administration of Justice Act 1956 (4 & 5 Eliz. 2. c. 46) and Diseases of Animals Act (Northern Ireland) 1958 (c. 13 (N.I.)))
Local Government (Scotland) Act 1894	57 & 58 Vict. c. 58	25 August 1894
An Act to establish a Local Government Board for Scotland, and make further provision for Local Government in Scotland, and for other purposes.
Appropriation Act 1894 (repealed)	57 & 58 Vict. c. 59	25 August 1894
An Act to apply a sum out of the Consolidated Fund to the service of the year ending on the thirty-first day of March one thousand eight hundred and ninety-five, and to appropriate the Supplies granted in this Session of Parliament. (Repealed by Statute Law Revision Act 1908 (8 Edw. 7. c. 49))
Merchant Shipping Act 1894 or the Imperial Shipping Act 1894	57 & 58 Vict. c. 60	25 August 1894
An Act to consolidate Enactments relating to Merchant Shipping.

=== Local acts ===
Short title	Citation	Royal assent
Long title
North Berwick Provisional Order Confirmation Act 1894	57 & 58 Vict. c. i	1 June 1894
An Act to confirm a Provisional Order made by the Secretary for Scotland, in pursuance of the Burgh Police (Scotland) Act, 1892, (Note: Burgh Police (Scotland) Act 1892 (55 & 56 Vict. c. 55)) to increase the number of Magistrates in the Royal Burgh of North Berwick.
	North Berwick Order 1894 Provisional Order to increase the Number of Magistrates in the Royal Burgh of North Berwick.	
Local Government Board (Ireland) Provisional Order Confirmation (No. 2) Act 1894	57 & 58 Vict. c. ii	1 June 1894
An Act to confirm a Provisional Order made by the Local Government Board for Ireland under the Public Health (Ireland) Act, 1878, (Note: Public Health (Ireland) Act 1878 (41 & 42 Vict. c. 52)) relating to the Town of Belturbet.
	Belturbet Town Provisional Order 1894 Town of Belturbet. Provisional Order.	
Local Government Board (Ireland) Provisional Order Confirmation (No. 3) Act 1894	57 & 58 Vict. c. iii	1 June 1894
An Act to confirm a Provisional Order made by the Local Government Board for Ireland under the Public Health (Ireland) Act, 1878, relating to the Rural Sanitary District of Waterford.
	Tramore Waterworks Provisional Order 1894 Tramore Waterworks. Provisional Order.	
Alloa Water (Amendment) Act 1894	57 & 58 Vict. c. iv	1 June 1894
An Act to amend the Alloa Water Act, 1891. (Note: Alloa Water Act 1891 (54 & 55 Vict. c. clxix))
Cockermouth, Keswick, and Penrith Railway Act 1894	57 & 58 Vict. c. v	1 June 1894
An Act to confer further powers upon the Cockermouth, Keswick, and Penrith Railway Company, and for other purposes.
London, Brighton and South Coast Railway (Steam Vessels) Act 1894	57 & 58 Vict. c. vi	1 June 1894
An Act to extend the provisions of the London Brighton and South Coast Railway Company (Steamboats) Act 1864. (Note: London, Brighton and South Coast Railway Company (Steamboats) Act 1864 (27 & 28 Vict. c. cliv))
City of London Police Superannuation Act 1894 (repealed)	57 & 58 Vict. c. vii	1 June 1894
An Act to amend the City of London Police Superannuation Act 1889. (Note: City of London Police Superannuation Act 1889 (52 & 53 Vict. c. cxxvii)) (Repealed by Police Pensions Act 1921 (11 & 12 Geo. 5. c. 31))
English, Scottish and Australian Bank Limited Act 1894	57 & 58 Vict. c. viii	1 June 1894
An Act to authorise the English Scottish and Australian Bank Limited to pay interest to the creditors of the English Scottish and Australian Chartered Bank upon their respective Debts for which Securities of the first-mentioned Bank are substituted in respect of the period between the suspension of the said Bank and the confirmation of the Plan of Arrangement of its affairs and for other purposes.
Queensland Investment and Land Mortgage Company's Act 1894	57 & 58 Vict. c. ix	1 June 1894
An Act for enabling the Queensland Investment and Land Mortgage Company Limited to subdivide their Capital into Preference and Ordinary Capital and for other purposes.
Royal Medical Benevolent College Act 1894 (repealed)	57 & 58 Vict. c. x	1 June 1894
An Act to amend the Royal Medical Benevolent College Act 1855. (Note: Royal Medical Benevolent College Act 1855 (18 & 19 Vict. c. clxvi)) (Repealed by Charities (Royal Medical Foundation of Epsom College) Order 2000 (SI 2000/1639))
Worcester and Broom Railway (Abandonment) Act 1894 (repealed)	57 & 58 Vict. c. xi	1 June 1894
An Act for the abandonment of the Worcester and Broom Railway. (Repealed by Statute Law (Repeals) Act 2013 (c. 2))
Manchester Sheffield and Lincolnshire, and Liverpool St. Helens and South Lancashire Railway Companies Act 1894 or the Manchester, Sheffield and Lincolnshire, and Liverpool, St. Helens and South Lancashire Railways Act 1894	57 & 58 Vict. c. xii	1 June 1894
An Act to confer further powers on the Manchester Sheffield and Lincolnshire Railway Company and the Liverpool St. Helens and South Lancashire Railway Company and for other purposes.
Hull and North Western Junction Railway (Abandonment) Act 1894	57 & 58 Vict. c. xiii	1 June 1894
An Act for the abandonment of the Undertaking of the Hull and North Western Junction Railway Company.
London Life Association Act 1894	57 & 58 Vict. c. xiv	1 June 1894
An Act to repeal the Acts relating to the London Life Association from the date of its registration as a Limited Company and to make provisions for the future government of the Association and the management of its affairs and for other purposes.
British American Land Company's Act 1894	57 & 58 Vict. c. xv	1 June 1894
An Act for granting further powers to the British American Land Company.
Pier and Harbour Orders Confirmation (No. 1) Act 1894	57 & 58 Vict. c. xvi	18 June 1894
An Act to confirm certain Provisional Orders made by the Board of Trade under the General Pier and Harbour Act, 1861, (Note: General Pier and Harbour Act 1861 (24 & 25 Vict. c. 45)) relating to Bangor, Dartmouth, Littlehampton, and Seaford.
	Bangor Harbour Order 1894 Order for reviving the Powers and extending the Time for the Construction of the Pier and Works at Bangor, in the County of Down, authorised by the Bangor Harbour Order, 1981.	
	Dartmouth Harbour Order 1894 Order for authorising the Dartmouth Harbour Commissioners to borrow further Moneys; and for other purposes.	
	Littlehampton Promenade Pier Order 1894 Order for the Construction, Maintenance, and Regulation of a Promenade Pier in extension of the Eastern Arm or Jetty of the Harbour at Littlehampton, in the County of Sussex.	
	Seaford Promenade Pier Order 1894 Order for the Construction, Maintenance, and Regulation of a Pier at Seaford, in the County of Sussex.	
Local Government Board's Provisional Order Confirmation (Housing of Working Classes) Act 1894	57 & 58 Vict. c. xvii	18 June 1894
An Act to confirm a Provisional Order of the Local Government Board under the Housing of the Working Classes Act, 1890, (Note: Housing of the Working Classes Act 1890 (53 & 54 Vict. c. 70)) relating to the Urban Sanitary District of Portsmouth.
	Portsmouth Order 1894 Provisional Order for confirming an Improvement Scheme under Part I. of the Housing of the Working Classes Act, 1890.	
Local Government Board (Ireland) Provisional Order Confirmation (No. 4) Act 1894	57 & 58 Vict. c. xviii	18 June 1894
An Act to confirm a Provisional Order made by the Local Government Board for Ireland under the Public Health (Ireland) Act, 1878, relating to the Urban Sanitary District of Lisburn.
	Lisburn Town Provisional Order 1894 Town of Lisburn. Provisional Order.	
Local Government Board's Provisional Orders Confirmation Act 1894	57 & 58 Vict. c. xix	18 June 1894
An Act to confirm certain Provisional Orders of the Local Government Board relating to the Liversedge and Mirfield and the Stroud Joint Hospital Districts.
	Liversedge and Mirfield Joint Hospital Order 1894 Provisional Order for forming a United District under Section 279 of the Public Health Act, 1875. (Note: Public Health Act 1875 (38 & 39 Vict. c. 55))	
	Stroud Joint Hospital Order 1894 Provisional Order for forming a United District under Section 279 of the Public Health Act, 1875.	
Local Government Board's Provisional Orders Confirmation (No. 2) Act 1894	57 & 58 Vict. c. xx	18 June 1894
An Act to confirm certain Provisional Orders of the Local Government Board relating to the Urban Sanitary Districts of Accrington, Ashton-under-Lyne, Berwick-upon-Tweed, Bolton, Hexham, Knaresborough and Tentergate, Llandilo, Merthyr Tydfil, Penrith, Southport, Wallasey, Widnes, and Workington.
	Accrington, &c. Order 1894 Provisional Order for partially repealing certain Confirming Acts.	
	Ashton-under-Lyne Order 1894 Provisional Order for partially repealing a Confirming Act. (Note: Local Government Supplemental Act 1869 (No. 2) (32 & 33 Vict. c. cl))	
	Bolton Order 1894 Provisional Order for partially repealing a Confirming Act. (Note: Local Government Supplemental Act 1871 (34 & 35 Vict. c. i))	
Local Government Board's Provisional Orders Confirmation (No. 3) Act 1894	57 & 58 Vict. c. xxi	18 June 1894
An Act to confirm certain Provisional Orders of the Local Government Board relating to the Urban Sanitary Districts of Bristol, Dover, Henley-upon-Thames, Idle, Nottingham, Padiham and Hapton, Tunbridge Wells, and Wells (Somerset).
	Bristol Order 1894 Provisional Order to enable the Urban Sanitary Authority for the City of Bristol to put in force the Compulsory Clauses of the Lands Clauses Acts.	
	Dover Order 1894 Provisional Order to enable the Urban Sanitary Authority for the Borough of Dover to put in force the Compulsory Clauses of the Lands Clauses Acts.	
	Henley-upon-Thames Order 1894 Provisional Order to enable the Urban Sanitary Authority for the Borough of Henley-upon-Thames to put in force the Compulsory Clauses of the Lands Clauses Acts.	
	Idle Order 1894 Provisional Order to enable the Sanitary Authority for the Urban Sanitary District of Idle to put in force the Compulsory Clauses of the Lands Clauses Acts.	
	Nottingham Order 1894 Provisional Order to enable the Urban Sanitary Authority for the Borough of Nottingham to put in force the Compulsory Clauses of the Lands Clauses Acts.	
	Padiham and Hapton Order 1894 Provisional Order to enable the Sanitary Authority for the Urban Sanitary District of Padiham and Hapton to put in force the Compulsory Clauses of the Lands Clauses Acts.	
	Tunbridge Wells Order 1894 Provisional Order to enable the Urban Sanitary Authority for the Borough of Tunbridge Wells to put in force the Compulsory Clauses of the Lands Clauses Acts.	
	Wells Order 1894 Provisional Order to enable the Urban Sanitary Authority for the City of Wells to put in force the Compulsory Clauses of the Lands Clauses Acts.	
Local Government Board's Provisional Orders Confirmation (No. 4) Act 1894	57 & 58 Vict. c. xxii	18 June 1894
An Act to confirm certain Provisional Orders of the Local Government Board relating to the Urban Sanitary Districts of Baildon, Burnley, Burton-upon-Trent, Leicester, Margate, Norwich, and Wigan, and the Port of Cardiff.
	Baildon Order 1894 Provisional Order for altering the Baildon Local Board Water Act, 1890. (Note: Baildon Local Board Water Act 1890 (53 & 54 Vict. c. xvii))	
	Burnley Order 1894 Provisional Order for altering the Burnley Borough Improvement Act, 1883. (Note: Burnley Borough Improvement Act 1883 (46 & 47 Vict. c. lxxvii))	
	Burton-upon-Trent Order 1894 Provisional Order for altering the Town of Burton-upon-Trent Act, 1853, (Note: Town of Burton-upon-Trent Act 1853 (16 & 17 Vict. c. cxviii)) and certain Confirming Acts.	
	Cardiff Order 1894 Provisional Order for partially repealing a Confirming Act. (Note: Local Government Board's Provisional Orders Confirmation Act 1882 (45 & 46 Vict. c. xxxiii))	
	Leicester Order 1894 Provisional Order for altering the Leicester Corporation Waterworks Act, 1890. (Note: Leicester Corporation Waterworks Act 1890 (53 & 54 Vict. c. xxxvi))	
	Margate Order 1894 Provisional Order for altering a Local Act. (Note: Margate Improvement Act 1813 (53 Geo. 3. c. 82))	
	Norwich Order 1894 Provisional Order for altering the Norwich Corporation Act, 1889. (Note: Norwich Corporation Act 1889 (52 & 53 Vict. c. clxxxvii))	
	Wigan Order 1894 Provisional Order for altering a Confirming Act. (Note: Local Government Board's Provisional Orders Confirmation (No. 4) Act 1892 (55 & 56 Vict. c. lxxi))	
Local Government Board's Provisional Orders Confirmation (No. 6) Act 1894	57 & 58 Vict. c. xxiii	18 June 1894
An Act to confirm certain Provisional Orders of the Local Government Board relating to the Urban Sanitary Districts of Bristol, Heckmondwike, Southampton, Sowerby Bridge, and Stockport.
	Bristol Order (No. 2) 1894 Provisional Order for partially repealing and altering the Saint Philip's Bridge (Bristol) Transfer Act, 1875. (Note: St. Philip's Bridge (Bristol) Transfer Act 1875 (38 & 39 Vict. c. xxviii))	
	Heckmondwike Order 1894 Provisional Order for partially repealing and altering certain Local Acts and a Confirming Act. (Note: Local Government Board's Provisional Orders Confirmation (No. 6) Act 1882 (45 & 46 Vict. c. lxiii))	
	Southampton Order 1894 Provisional Order for altering the Southampton Corporation Act, 1885, (Note: Southampton Corporation Act 1885 (48 & 49 Vict. c. clxx)) and a Confirming Act. (Note: Local Government Board's Provisional Orders Confirmation (No. 11) Act 1891 (54 & 55 Vict. c. cvii))	
	Sowerby Bridge Order 1894 Provisional Order for altering certain Local Acts and Confirming Acts.	
	Stockport Order 1894 Provisional Order for altering certain Local Acts.	
Local Government Board (Ireland) Provisional Order Confirmation (No. 8) Act 1894	57 & 58 Vict. c. xxiv	18 June 1894
An Act to confirm a Provisional Order made by the Local Government Board for Ireland under the Public Health (Ireland) Act, 1878, relating to the Rural Sanitary District of Strabane.
	Sion Waterworks Provisional Order 1894 Sion, Liggartown, and Ballyfatten Waterworks. Provisional Order.	
Australian Mortgage and Agency Company Act 1894	57 & 58 Vict. c. xxv	18 June 1894
An Act for creating a Preference Stock of the Australasian Mortgage and Agency Company Limited and for other purposes relating thereto.
Grand Canal Act 1894	57 & 58 Vict. c. xxvi	18 June 1894
An Act for the transfer of the undertaking of the Barrow Navigation Company to the Grand Canal Company to confer further powers on the Grand Canal Company and for other purposes.
Merthyr Tydfil Stipendiary Justices Act 1894 (repealed)	57 & 58 Vict. c. xxvii	18 June 1894
An Act to extend the limits of the Act for appointing a Stipendiary Justice of the Peace for the parish of Merthjnr Tydfil and adjoining places and for other purposes. (Repealed by Mid Glamorgan County Council Act 1987 (c. vii))
Bray and Enniskerry Railway Act 1894	57 & 58 Vict. c. xxviii	18 June 1894
An Act to extend the period for the completion of the railway authorised by the Bray and Enniskerry Light Railway Act 1886 (Note: Bray and Enniskerry Light Railway Act 1886 (49 & 50 Vict. c. xii)) to confer additional powers on the Company with reference to their capital and undertaking and for other purposes.
Doncaster Corporation Act 1894	57 & 58 Vict. c. xxix	18 June 1894
An Act for enabling an agreement between the Corporation of Doncaster and Alexander Henry Browne respecting part of the Town Field in Doncaster to be carried into effect.
Hull, Barnsley and West Riding Junction Railway and Dock Act 1894	57 & 58 Vict. c. xxx	18 June 1894
An Act for extending the time limited for the construction by the Hull Barnsley and West Riding Junction Railway and Dock Company of certain of their authorised works and for conferring further powers upon the Company and amending the Acts relating to them.
Millom Local Board Act 1894	57 & 58 Vict. c. xxxi	18 June 1894
An Act for conferring on the Millom Local Board further powers in relation to the supply of Gas and Water and for other purposes.
Rochdale Canal Act 1894	57 & 58 Vict. c. xxxii	18 June 1894
An Act to renew the powers of the Company of Proprietors of the Rochdale Canal to borrow money to amend the Acts relating to that Company and for other purposes.
Paignton Gas Act 1894	57 & 58 Vict. c. xxxiii	18 June 1894
An Act for incorporating and conferring powers on the Paignton Gas Company.
Great North of Scotland Railway Act 1894	57 & 58 Vict. c. xxxiv	18 June 1894
An Act to confer further Powers on the Great North of Scotland Railway Company.
Local Government Board (Ireland) Provisional Order Confirmation (No. 6) Act 1894	57 & 58 Vict. c. xxxv	3 July 1894
An Act to confirm a Provisional Order made by the Local Government Board for Ireland under the Public Health (Ireland) Act, 1878, relating to the Rural Sanitary District of Tullamore.
	Tullamore Waterworks Provisional Order 1894 Tullamore Waterworks. Provisional Order.	
Local Government Board (Ireland) Provisional Order Confirmation (No. 7) Act 1894	57 & 58 Vict. c. xxxvi	3 July 1894
An Act to confirm a Provisional Order made by the Local Government Board for Ireland under the Public Health (Ireland) Act, 1878, relating to the Rural Sanitary District of Roscrea.
	Roscrea Waterworks Provisional Order 1894 Roscrea Waterworks. Provisional Order.	
Local Government Board (Ireland) Provisional Orders Confirmation (No. 9) Act 1894	57 & 58 Vict. c. xxxvii	3 July 1894
An Act to confirm two Provisional Orders made by the Local Government Board for Ireland under the Housing of the Working Classes Act, 1890, and the Public Health (Ireland) Act, 1878, relating to the Urban Sanitary District of Dublin.
	Dublin (Bride's Alley Area) Provisional Order 1894 Provisional Order authorising the purchase and taking of lands and premises otherwise than by agreement for the purposes of the Housing of the Working Classes Act, 1890, Part III.	
	Dublin (John's Lane) Provisional Order 1894 Provisional Order authorising the purchase and taking of lands and premises otherwise than by agreement for the purpose of widening, enlarging, and improving a street.	
Local Government Board (Ireland) Provisional Order Confirmation (No. 10) Act 1894	57 & 58 Vict. c. xxxviii	3 July 1894
An Act to confirm a Provisional Order made by the Local Government Board for Ireland under the Public Health (Ireland) Act, 1878, relating to the Urban Sanitaiy District of Lame.
	Larne Waterworks Provisional Order 1894 Larne Waterworks. Provisional Order.	
Local Government Board (Ireland) Provisional Order Confirmation (No. 11) Act 1894	57 & 58 Vict. c. xxxix	3 July 1894
An Act to confirm a Provisional Order made W the Local Government Board for Ireland under the Public Health (Ireland) Act, 1878, relating to the Urban Sanitary District of Clones.
	Clones Waterworks Provisional Order 1894 Clones Waterworks. Provisional Order.	
Local Government Board (Ireland) Provisional Order Confirmation (No. 12) Act 1894	57 & 58 Vict. c. xl	3 July 1894
An Act to confirm a Provisional Order made by the Local Government Board for Ireland under the Public Health (Ireland) Act, 1878, relating to the Rural Sanitary District of Coleraine.
	Portstewart Waterworks and Sewerage Provisional Order 1894 Portstewart Waterworks and Sewerage Works. Provisional Order.	
Wemyss, and Buckhaven, Methil and Innerleven Water Supply Confirmation Act 1894 (repealed)	57 & 58 Vict. c. xli	3 July 1894
An Act to confirm a Provisional Order made by the Secretary for Scotland under the Public Health (Scotland) Act, 1867, (Note: Public Health (Scotland) Act 1867 (30 & 31 Vict. c. 101)) relating to Wemyss, and Buckhaven Methil and Innerleven Water. (Repealed by Fife County Council Order Confirmation Act 1940 (3 & 4 Geo. 6. c. xliii))
	Wemyss, and Buckhaven Methil and Innerleven Water Supply. Provisional Order. Wemyss, and Buckhaven, Methil and Innerleven Water Supply Order 1894	
Metropolitan Police Provisional Order Confirmation Act 1894 (repealed)	57 & 58 Vict. c. xlii	3 July 1894
An Act to confirm a Provisional Order made by one of Her Majesty's Principal Secretaries of State under the Metropolitan Police Act, 1886, (Note: Metropolitan Police Act 1886 (49 & 50 Vict. c. 22)) relating to lands in the Parishes of St. Pancras, and St. Giles, Camberwell. (Repealed by Statute Law (Repeals) Act 2008 (c. 12))
	Order made by the Secretary of State under the Metropolitan Police Act, 1886.	
Commons Regulation (Luton) Provisional Order Confirmation Act 1894	57 & 58 Vict. c. xliii	3 July 1894
An Act to confirm a Provisional Order of the Board of Agriculture relating to the Regulation of certain Commons in the Borough of Luton in the County of Bedford.
	Luton Order 1894 Provisional Order of Regulation.	
Local Government Board's Provisional Order Confirmation (Gas) Act 1894	57 & 58 Vict. c. xliv	3 July 1894
An Act to confirm a Provisional Order of the Local Government Board under the Gas and Water Works Facilities Act, 1870, (Note: Gas and Water Works Facilities Act 1870 (33 & 34 Vict. c. 70)) and the Public Health Act, 1875, relating to the Urban Sanitary District of Wokingham.
	Wokingham Gas Order 1894 Provisional Order under the Gas and Water Works Facilities Act, 1870.	
Local Government Board's Provisional Orders Confirmation (Housing of Working Classes) (No. 2) Act 1894	57 & 58 Vict. c. xlv	3 July 1894
An Act to confirm certain Provisional Orders of the Local Government Board under the Housing of the Working Classes Act, 1890, relating to the Urban Sanitary Districts of Sheffield, Sunderland, and Wigan.
	Sheffield (Housing of Working Classes) Order 1894 Provisional Order for confirming an Improvement Scheme under Part I. of the Housing of the Working Classes Act, 1890.	
	Sunderland (Housing of Working Classes) Order 1894 Provisional Order for confirming an Improvement Scheme under Part I. of the Housing of the Working Classes Act, 1890.	
	Wigan (Housing of Working Classes) Order 1894 Provisional Order for confirming certain Improvement Schemes under Part I. of the Housing of the Working Classes Act, 1890.	
Local Government Board's Provisional Orders Confirmation (No. 5) Act 1894	57 & 58 Vict. c. xlvi	3 July 1894
An Act to confirm certain Provisional Orders of the Local Government Board relating to the Urban Sanitary Districts of Bredbury and Romiley, Layton, Swadlincote, and Wilmslow, and the Rural Sanitary District of the Wharfedale Union.
	Bredbury and Romiley Order 1894 Provisional Order to enable the Sanitary Authority for the Urban Sanitary District of Bredbury and Romiley to put in force the Compulsory Clauses of the Lands Clauses Acts.	
	Leyton Order 1894 Provisional Order to enable the Sanitary Authority for the Urban Sanitary District of Leyton to put in force the Compulsory Clauses of the Lands Clauses Acts.	
	Swadlincote Order 1894 Provisional Order to enable the Sanitary Authority for the Urban Sanitary District of Swadlincote to put in force the Compulsory Clauses of the Lands Clauses Acts.	
	Wharfdale Union Order 1894 Provisional Order to enable the Sanitary Authority for the Rural Sanitary District of the Wharfedale Union to put in force the Compulsory Clauses of the Lands Clauses Acts.	
	Wilmslow Order 1894 Provisional Order to enable the Sanitary Authority for the Urban Sanitary District of Wilmslow to put in force the Compulsory Clauses of the Lands Clauses Acts.	
Local Government Board's Provisional Orders Confirmation (No. 8) Act 1894	57 & 58 Vict. c. xlvii	3 July 1894
An Act to confirm certain Provisional Orders of the Local Government Board relating to the Urban Sanitary Districts of Gosport and Alverstoke, Harrow, Ilfracombe, Norwich, Ramsgate, and Redruth.
	Gosport and Alverstoke Order 1894 Provisional Order to enable the Sanitary Authority for the Urban Sanitary District of Gosport and Alverstoke to put in force the Compulsory Clauses of the Lands Clauses Acts.	
	Harrow Order 1894 Provisional Order to enable the Sanitary Authority for the Urban Sanitary District of Harrow to put in force the Compulsory Clauses of the Lands Clauses Acts.	
	Ilfracombe Order 1894 Provisional Order to enable the Sanitary Authority for the Urban Sanitary District of Ilfracombe to put in force the Compulsory Clauses of the Lands Clauses Acts.	
	Norwich Order (No. 2) 1894 Provisional Order to enable the Urban Sanitary Authority for the City of Norwich to put in force the Compulsory Clauses of the Lands Clauses Acts.	
	Ramsgate Order 1894 Provisional Order to enable the Urban Sanitary Authority for the Borough of Ramsgate to put in force the Compulsory Clauses of the Lands Clauses Acts.	
	Redruth Order 1894 Provisional Order to enable the Sanitary Authority for the Urban Sanitary District of Redruth to put in force the Compulsory Clauses of the Lands Clauses Acts.	
Railway Rates and Charges (Easingwold Railway, &c.) Order Confirmation Act 1894 (repealed)	57 & 58 Vict. c. xlviii	3 July 1894
An Act to confirm a Provisional Order made by the Board of Trade under the Railway and Canal Traffic Act, 1888, (Note: Railway and Canal Traffic Act 1888 (51 & 52 Vict. c. 25)) relating to the Classification of Merchandise Traffic, and the Schedule of Maximum Rates and Charges of the Easingwold Railway Company, the Crieff and Comrie Railway Company, the East and West Yorkshire Union Railway Company, the Harrow and Stanmore Railway Company, the Shortlands and Nunhead Railway Company, the South Clare Railways Company (Limited) and the Stocksbridge Railway Company. (Repealed by Statute Law (Repeals) Act 2013 (c. 2))
	Railway Rates and Charges (Easingwold Railway, &c.) Order 1894 Order of the Board of Trade under the Railway and Canal Traffic Act, 1888, fixing the Classification of Merchandise Traffic, and the Schedule of Maximum Rates and Charges, including all Terminal Charges, applicable to the said Classification of the Easingwold Railway Company, (Note: Easingwold Railway) the Crieff and Comrie Railway Company, (Note: Crieff and Comrie Railway) the East and West Yorkshire Union Railway Company, (Note: East and West Yorkshire Union Railways) the Harrow and Stanmore Railway Company, (Note: Harrow and Stanmore Railway) the Shortlands and Nunhead Railway Company, (Note: Shortlands and Nunhead Railway) the South Clare Railways Company, Limited, (Note: South Clare Railway) and the Stocksbridge Railway Company. (Note: Stocksbridge Railway)	
Electric Lighting Orders Confirmation (No. 1) Act 1894	57 & 58 Vict. c. xlix	3 July 1894
An Act to confirm certain Provisional Orders made by the Board of Trade under the Electric Lighting Acts, 1882 (Note: Electric Lighting Act 1882 (45 & 46 Vict. c. 56)) and 1888, (Note: Electric Lighting Act 1888 (51 & 52 Vict. c. 12)) relating to Barrow-in-Furness, Buxton, Chopping Wycombe, Chesterfield, St, Helen’s, and West Hartlepool.
	Barrow-in-Furness Corporation Electric Lighting Order 1894 Provisional Order granted by the Board of Trade under the Electric Lighting Acts 1882 and 1888 to the Mayor Aldermen and Burgesses of the Borough of Barrow-in-Furness in respect of the Borough of Barrow-in-Furness.	
	Buxton Electric Lighting Order 1894 Provisional Order granted by the Board of Trade under the Electric Lighting Acts 1882 and 1888 to the Buxton Local Board in respect of the Urban Sanitary District of Buxton in the County of Derby.	
	Chepping Wycombe Electric Lighting Order 1894 Provisional Order granted by the Board of Trade under the Electric Lighting Acts 1882 and 1888 to the Mayor Aldermen and Burgesses of the Borough of Chepping Wycombe in the County of Buckingham in respect of the Borough of Chepping Wycombe.	
	Chesterfield (Corporation) Electric Lighting Order 1894 Provisional Order granted by the Board of Trade under the Electric Lighting Acts 1882 and 1888 to the Mayor Aldermen and Burgesses of the Borough of Chesterfield in respect of the Borough of Chesterfield in the County of Derby.	
	St. Helens Corporation Electric Lighting Order 1894 Provisional Order granted by the Board of Trade under the Electric Lighting Acts 1882 and 1888 to the Mayor Aldermen and Burgesses of the Borough of St. Helens in respect of the Borough of St. Helens.	
	West Hartlepool Electric Lighting Order 1894 Provisional Order granted by the Board of Trade under the Electric Lighting Acts 1882 and 1888 to the Mayor Aldermen and Burgesses of the Borough of West Hartlepool in respect of the Borough of West Hartlepool in the County of Durham.	
Electric Lighting Orders Confirmation (No. 2) Act 1894	57 & 58 Vict. c. l	3 July 1894
An Act to confirm certain Provisional Orders made by the Board of Trade under the Electric Lighting Acts, 1882 and 1888, relating to Grimsby, Harrow, Leyton, Monmouth, Petenborough, and St. Austell.
	Grimsby (Corporation) Electric Lighting Order 1894 Provisional Order granted by the Board of Trade under the Electric Lighting Acts 1882 and 1888 to the Mayor Aldermen and Burgesses of the Borough of Grimsby in respect of the Borough of Grimsby in the County of Lincoln.	
	Harrow Electric Lighting Order 1894 Provisional Order granted by the Board of Trade under the Electric Lighting Acts 1882 and 1888 to the Harrow Local Board in respect of the Urban Sanitary District of Harrow in the County of Middleseх.	
	Leyton Local Board Electric Lighting Order 1894 Provisional Order granted by the Board of Trade under the Electric Lighting Acts 1882 and 1888 to the Leyton Local Board in respect of the Local Government District of Leyton in the county of Essex.	
	Monmouth Electric Lighting Order 1894 Provisional Order granted by the Board of Trade under the Electric Lighting Acts 1882 and 1888 to the Mayor Aldermen and Burgesses of the Borough of Monmouth in respect of the Borough of Monmouth in the County of Monmouth.	
	Peterborough Electric Lighting Order 1894 Provišional Order granted by the Board of Trade under the Electric Lighting Acts 1882 and 1888 to the Mayor Aldermen Citizens and Burgesses of the City and Borough of Peterborough in respect of the City and Borough of Peterborough.	
	St. Austell Electric Lighting Order 1894 Provisional Order granted by the Board of Trade under the Electric Lighting Acts 1882 and 1888 to Veale & Co. Limited in respect of the district of the St. Austell Local Board in the County of Cornwall.	
Mussel Fishery (Cockenzie) Order Confirmation Act 1894 (repealed)	57 & 58 Vict. c. li	3 July 1894
An Act to confirm an Order made by the Secretary for Scotland under the Sea Fisheries Act, 1868, (Note: Sea Fisheries Act 1868 (31 & 32 Vict. c. 45)) relating to a several Mussel Fishery at Cockenzie, County of Haddington. (Repealed by Statute Law (Repeals) Act 1998 (c. 43))
	Cockenzie Fishery Order 1894 Order for Establishment and Maintenance by the Municipality of Cockenzie and Port Seton of a several Mussel Fishery on the foreshore of the land lying between the Eastern Boundary of the Burgh of Prestonpans and the Western Boundary of Cockenzie and Port Seton, in the County of Haddington.	
Thurles Railway Station Act 1894	57 & 58 Vict. c. lii	3 July 1894
An Act to confirm an agreement entered into between the Great Southern and Western Railway Company and the Commissioners of Public Works in Ireland for the improvement and use of the Railway Station at Thurles.
Neath Harbour Act 1894	57 & 58 Vict. c. liii	3 July 1894
An Act to extend the time for the completion of the authorised works for enlarging and improving the port and harbour of Neath.
Croydon Gas Act 1894	57 & 58 Vict. c. liv	3 July 1894
An Act to provide for the amalgamation of the Carshalton Gas Company with the Croydon Commercial Gas and Coke Company and for other purposes.
Edinburgh and Leith Corporation Gas (Additional Powers) Act 1894 (repealed)	57 & 58 Vict. c. lv	3 July 1894
An Act to confer further powers on the Edinburgh and Leith Corporations Gas Commissioners in relation to their Gas Undertaking and for the construction of additional Gasworks and for other purposes. (Repealed by Edinburgh Corporation Order Confirmation Act 1962 (11 & 12 Eliz. 2. c. ii))
Edinburgh Corporation Stock Act 1894 (repealed)	57 & 58 Vict. c. lvi	3 July 1894
An Act to enable the Corporation of Edinburgh to create and issue Corporation Stock to authorise the redemption of the City Creditors Annuities and of certain annual payments by the Commissioners for the Harbour and Docks of Leith and for other purposes. (Repealed by Edinburgh Corporation Order Confirmation Act 1933 (24 & 25 Geo. 5. c. v))
Central London Railway Act 1894	57 & 58 Vict. c. lvii	3 July 1894
An Act to extend the time for the purchase of lands for and for the completion of the Central London Railway and for other purposes.
Fulwood Local Board (Water) Act 1894 (repealed)	57 & 58 Vict. c. lviii	3 July 1894
An Act to empower the Local Board of Fulwood to improve their existing water supply and to confer further powers on the Local Board. (Repealed by County of Lancashire Act 1984 (c. xxi))
Aberdare Local Board Waterworks Act 1894	57 & 58 Vict. c. lix	3 July 1894
An Act to authorise the Local Board for the district of Aberdare to construct additional Waterworks and for other purposes.
Cambridge University and Corporation Act 1894	57 & 58 Vict. c. lx	3 July 1894
An Act to amend the Law relating to the jurisdiction of the Chancellor Vice-Chancellor and other authorities of the University of Cambridge over persons not Members of the University and to make better provision for the use of commons the management of markets and fairs and in other respects for the local government and improvement of the borough of Cambridge and for other purposes.
Southend Waterworks Act 1894 (repealed)	57 & 58 Vict. c. lxi	3 July 1894
An Act for extending the limits of supply of the Southend Waterworks Company and for conferring further powers on the Company for the construction of works the raising of capital and otherwise in relation to their undertaking. (Repealed by Essex Water Order 1970 (SI 1970/786))
Torquay Gas Act 1894	57 & 58 Vict. c. lxii	3 July 1894
An Act for conferring further powers on the Torquay Gas Company.
Bury Corporation Act 1894 (repealed)	57 & 58 Vict. c. lxiii	3 July 1894
An Act to authorise the Corporation of Bury to purchase land in connection with their waterworks undertaking and for other purposes. (Repealed by Bury Corporation Act 1909 (9 Edw. 7. c. clix))
Bridlington Local Board Act 1894 (repealed)	57 & 58 Vict. c. lxiv	3 July 1894
An Act to enable the Local Board for the District of Bridlington to hold and acquire certain lands and hereditaments at Bridlington Quay now held in trust for them and to confer upon the said Local Board further powers for the good government of their District and for other purposes. (Repealed by Humberside Act 1980 (c. iii))
Bacup Corporation Water Act 1894	57 & 58 Vict. c. lxv	3 July 1894
An Act to authorise the Mayor Aldermen and Burgesses of the Borough of Bacup in the County of Lancaster to purchase and acquire the Undertaking of the Rossendale Waterworks Company and for other purposes.
London, Chatham and Dover Railway Act 1894	57 & 58 Vict. c. lxvi	3 July 1894
An Act to confer further powers upon the London Chatham and Dover Railway Company and for other purposes.
Surrey Commercial Dock Act 1894 (repealed)	57 & 58 Vict. c. lxvii	3 July 1894
An Act to authorise the Surrey Commercial Dock Company to alter and extend their Works to raise further Capital and for other purposes. (Repealed by Port of London (Consolidation) Act 1920 (10 & 11 Geo. 5. c. clxxiii))
Falkirk Corporation Gas Act 1894	57 & 58 Vict. c. lxviii	3 July 1894
An Act to authorise the Magistrates and Town Council of the Burgh of Falkirk to erect construct and maintain Gasworks and supply with Gas the Burgh of Falkirk and districts and places adjacent to empower the Magistrates and Town Council to purchase and the Falkirk Joint Stock Gas Company Limited to sell to the Magistrates and Town Council the Gasworks and property of that Company and for other purposes.
Abertillery Local Board (Gas and Water) Act 1894	57 & 58 Vict. c. lxix	3 July 1894
An Act to authorise the transfer of part of the Undertaking of the Brynmawr and Abertillery Gas and Water Company to the Abertillery Local Board to regulate the Capital and Powers of the Company and for other purposes.
South Hants Water Act 1894	57 & 58 Vict. c. lxx	3 July 1894
An Act to extend the limits of supply of the South Hants Waterworks Company and to confer further powers upon that Company and for other purposes.
Newcastle and Gateshead Water Act 1894	57 & 58 Vict. c. lxxi	3 July 1894
An Act to empower the Newcastle and Gateshead Water Company to abandon the construction of a portion of certain Works authorised by the Newcastle and Gateshead Waterworks Act 1889, (Note: Newcastle and Gateshead Waterworks Act 1889 (52 & 53 Vict. c. xxxvi)) and to construct a New Reservoir and Works in lieu thereof and for other purposes.
Mersey Railway (Rates and Charges) Act 1894 (repealed)	57 & 58 Vict. c. lxxii	3 July 1894
An Act for transferring the Mersey Railway Company with respect to the classification of merchandise traffic and the schedule of maximum rates and charges from the Order applicable to the Taff Vale Railway Company to the Order applicable to the East London Railway Company. (Repealed by Statute Law (Repeals) Act 2013 (c. 2))
Harrow Road and Paddington Tramways Act 1894	57 & 58 Vict. c. lxxiii	3 July 1894
An Act to further extend the time for the compulsory purchase of lands and for the completion of the tramways authorised by the Harrow Road and Paddington Tramways Act 1891. (Note: Harrow Road and Paddington Tramways Act 1891 (54 & 55 Vict. c. clxviii))
Dundee Corporation Act 1894 (repealed)	57 & 58 Vict. c. lxxiv	3 July 1894
An Act to provide for the constitution of the City and Royal Burgh of Dundee as a County of a City and to confer various powers on the Lord Provost Magistrates and Town Council for affording greater facilities for transacting the public business of the said City and Burgh and for other purposes. (Repealed by Dundee Corporation (Consolidated Powers) Order Confirmation Act 1957 (6 & 7 Eliz. 2. c. iv))
Great Northern Railway Act 1894	57 & 58 Vict. c. lxxv	3 July 1894
An Act to confer further powers upon the Great Northern Railway Company with respect to their own undertaking and to vest in that Company the undertaking of the Hunslet Railway Company to empower the Stamford and Essendine Railway Company to lease their undertaking to the Great Northern Railway Company to vest the undertaking of the Halifax High Level Railway Company in the Great Northern Railway Company and the Lancashire and Yorkshire Railway Company jointly and for other purposes.
Tottenham and Forest Gate Railway Act 1894	57 & 58 Vict. c. lxxvi	3 July 1894
An Act to confer further powers on the Tottenham and Forest Gate Railway Company and for other purposes.
South Yorkshire Junction Railway Act 1894	57 & 58 Vict. c. lxxvii	3 July 1894
An Act to extend the time for the completion of certain authorised railways of the South Yorkshire Junction Railway Company and revive the powers for the purchase of lands for such railways and for other purposes.
Kendal Corporation Gas and Water Act 1894	57 & 58 Vict. c. lxxviii	20 July 1894
An Act to authorise the transfer of the Undertaking of the Kendal Union Gas and Water Company to the Corporation of Kendal the construction of Additional Waterworks and for other purposes.
Barry Dock and Railways Act 1888 (Amendment) Act 1894	57 & 58 Vict. c. lxxix	20 July 1894
An Act to explain section 23 of the Barry Dock and Railways Act 1888 (Note: Barry Dock and Railways Act 1888 (51 & 52 Vict. c. clxxxii)) and for other purposes.
Cornwall Minerals Railway Act 1894	57 & 58 Vict. c. lxxx	20 July 1894
An Act to confer further powers on the Cornwall Minerals Railway Company.
Manchester, Sheffield and Lincolnshire Railway Act 1894	57 & 58 Vict. c. lxxxi	20 July 1894
An Act to confer further powers upon the Manchester Sheffield and Lincolnshire Railway Company the Manchester South Junction and Altrincham Railway Company and the Wigan Junction Railways Company and for other purposes.
East and West Yorkshire Union Railways Act 1894	57 & 58 Vict. c. lxxxii	20 July 1894
An Act for the abandonment of the unexecuted works of the East and West Yorkshire Union Railways Company for the reduction of the authorised share and loan capital of that Company and to empower them to raise further money and for other purposes.
Neath Corporation Water Act 1894	57 & 58 Vict. c. lxxxiii	20 July 1894
An Act to authorise the Mayor Aldermen and Burgesses of the borough of Neath in the county of Glamorgan to acquire the undertaking of the Neath Water Company to construct Waterworks and supply Water and for other purposes.
St. Andrews Links Act 1894 (repealed)	57 & 58 Vict. c. lxxxiv	20 July 1894
An Act to empower the Commissioners of the City and Royal Burgh of St. Andrews to acquire the Links of St. Andrews for a Public Park and Recreation Ground and for other purposes. (Repealed by St. Andrews Links Order Confirmation Act 1974 (c. iii))
Leicestershire and Northamptonshire Union and Grand Union Canals (Transfer) Act 1894	57 & 58 Vict. c. lxxxv	20 July 1894
An Act to authorise the transfer of the Leicestershire and Northamptonshire Union Canal and of the Grand Union Canal to the Company of Proprietors of the Grand Junction Canal and for other purposes.
Charing Cross, Euston and Hampstead Railway Act 1894	57 & 58 Vict. c. lxxxvi	20 July 1894
An Act to confer further powers on the Charing Cross Euston and Hampstead Railway Company and for other purposes.
Cordoba Central Railway Company (Limited) Act 1894	57 & 58 Vict. c. lxxxvii	20 July 1894
An Act for authorising the Cordoba Central Railway Company Limited to prepare and carry into effect a scheme of arrangement with its debenture stockholders creditors or shareholders or any class or classes of such persons and for other purposes.
Lambourn Valley Railway Act 1894	57 & 58 Vict. c. lxxxviii	20 July 1894
An Act to extend the time for completing and opening the Lambourn Valley Railway and for other purposes.
Scarborough (Shore to Shore) Tunnel Act 1894	57 & 58 Vict. c. lxxxix	20 July 1894
An Act for making a Carriage Road in Tunnel under part of the town of Scarborough to connect the south shore with the north shore and for other purposes.
Dublin, Wicklow and Wexford Railway and City of Dublin Junction Railways Act 1894	57 & 58 Vict. c. xc	20 July 1894
An Act to enable the Dublin Wicklow and Wexford Railway Company to raise additional capital for the City of Dublin Junction Railways and for the Dublin Wicklow and Wexford Railway to confer further powers on the Company and for other purposes.
Gloucester Corporation Act 1894	57 & 58 Vict. c. xci	20 July 1894
An Act to empower the Corporation of Gloucester to construct additional waterworks to consolidate the parishes within the city and to make better provision for the health local government and improvement of the city and for other purposes.
London and North Western Railway Act 1894	57 & 58 Vict. c. xcii	20 July 1894
An Act for conferring further Powers upon the London and North Western Railway Company in relation to their own Undertaking and other Undertakings in which they are interested jointly with other Companies and also for conferring Powers upon the Great Western Railway Company the Shropshire Union Railways and Canal Company and the Dundalk Newry and Greenore Railway Company in relation to such other Undertakings and for other purposes.
Longton, Adderley Green, and Bucknall Railway (Transfer) Act 1894	57 & 58 Vict. c. xciii	20 July 1894
An Act for vesting the undertaking of the Longton Adderley Green and Bucknall Railway Company in the North Staffordshire Railway Company and for other purposes,
Talycafn Bridge Act 1894	57 & 58 Vict. c. xciv	20 July 1894
An Act to authorise the making of a Bridge over the River Conway in the counties of Denbigh and Carnarvon at Talycafn and approach roads thereto and for other purposes.
Pontypridd Waterworks (Tramroad) Act 1894 (repealed)	57 & 58 Vict. c. xcv	20 July 1894
An Act for making a Tramroad in the county of Glamorgan in connexion with the undertaking of the Pontypridd Waterworks Company and for other purposes. (Repealed by Pontypridd and Rhondda Water Act 1910 (10 Edw. 7 & 1 Geo. 5. c. cxx))
Midland Railway Act 1894	57 & 58 Vict. c. xcvi	20 July 1894
An Act to confer Additional Powers upon the Midland Railway Company and the Midland and Great Northern Railways Joint Committee for the Construction of Works and the Acquisition of Lands to make provision for the ranking of the existing and of future Debenture Stock and Mortgages of the Midland Railway Company and for other purposes.
Swinton Local Board Act 1894	57 & 58 Vict. c. xcvii	20 July 1894
An Act to empower the Local Board of Swinton in Yorkshire to improve their existing Water Supply and to confer further powers on the Local Board.
Hebden Bridge Gas Act 1894	57 & 58 Vict. c. xcviii	20 July 1894
An Act to confer further powers on the Hebden Bridge Gas Company.
Wakefield Corporation Water Act 1894	57 & 58 Vict. c. xcix	20 July 1894
An Act for conferring further powers upon the Corporation of Wakefield in relation to their Waterworks Undertaking and for other purposes.
Budleigh Salterton Railway Act 1894	57 & 58 Vict. c. c	20 July 1894
An Act for incorporating the Budleigh Salterton Railway Company and for other purposes.
Wallasey Embankment Act 1894 (repealed)	57 & 58 Vict. c. ci	20 July 1894
An Act to make further provision for the extension enlargement maintenance and repair of the Wallasey Embankment and for other purposes. (Repealed by County of Merseyside Act 1980 (c. x))
Milford Docks Act 1894 (repealed)	57 & 58 Vict. c. cii	20 July 1894
An Act to confer further powers upon the Milford Docks Company and for other purposes. (Repealed by Milford Docks Act 1900 (63 & 64 Vict. c. lxxiii))
Cheltenham College Act 1894	57 & 58 Vict. c. ciii	20 July 1894
An Act to make provisions with respect to the constitution and management of Cheltenham College.
London, Brighton, and South Coast Railway Act 1894	57 & 58 Vict. c. civ	20 July 1894
An Act to confer further powers on the London Brighton and South Coast Railway Company and for other purposes.
Swansea Harbour Act 1894	57 & 58 Vict. c. cv	20 July 1894
An Act to authorise the Swansea Harbour Trustees to enlarge and extend the Prince of Wales Dock at Swansea and for other purposes.
Maryport Harbour Act 1894	57 & 58 Vict. c. cvi	20 July 1894
An Act to incorporate Commissioners and to transfer to and vest in them the Harbour Undertaking of the Trustees for the District and Harbour of Maryport to alter the constitution of such Trustees and for other purposes.
Local Government Board (Ireland) Provisional Order Confirmation (No. 1) Act 1894	57 & 58 Vict. c. cvii	20 July 1894
An Act to confirm a Provisional Order made by the Local Government Board for Ireland under the Housing of the Working Classes Act, 1890, relating to the Town of Fermoy.
	Fermoy Provisional Order 1894 Town of Fermoy. Provisional Order.	
Local Government Board (Ireland) Provisional Order Confirmation (No. 5) Act 1894	57 & 58 Vict. c. cviii	20 July 1894
An Act to confirm a Provisional Order made by the Local Government Board for Ireland under the Public Health (Ireland) Act, 1878, relating to the Urban Sanitary District of Athlone.
	Athlone Provisional Order 1894 Town of Athlone. Provisional Order.	
Local Government Board (Ireland) Provisional Order Confirmation (No. 13) Act 1894	57 & 58 Vict. c. cix	20 July 1894
An Act to confirm a Provisional Order made by the Local Government Board for Ireland under the Housing of the Working Classes Act, 1890, and the Public Health (Ireland) Act, 1878, relating to the Urban Sanitary District of the Pembroke Townslnp.
	Pembroke Township Provisional Order 1894 Pembroke Township. Provisional Order.	
Local Government Board (Ireland) Provisional Order Confirmation (No. 14) Act 1894	57 & 58 Vict. c. cx	20 July 1894
An Act to confirm a Provisional Order made by the Local Government Board for Ireland under the Public Health (Ireland) Act, 1878, relating to the Urban Sanitary District of the Township of Kingstown.
	Kingstown Cholera Hospital Provisional Order 1894 Township of Kingstown. Provisional Order.	
Pier and Harbour Orders Confirmation (No. 2) Act 1894	57 & 58 Vict. c. cxi	20 July 1894
An Act to confirm certain Provisional Orders made by the Board of Trade under the General Pier and Harbour Act, 1861, relating to Collieston, Fraserburgh, Polperro, and Whitelinks.
	Collieston Harbour Order 1894 Order for the construction, maintenance, and regulation of a Harbour at Collieston, in the Parish of Slains, in the County of Aberdeen.	
	Fraserburgh Harbour Order 1894 Order for enabling the Commissioners of the Police Burgh of Fraserburgh, in the County of Aberdeen, to guarantee payment of Money raised by the Fraserburgh Harbour Commissioners.	
	Polperro Harbour Order 1894 Order for incorporating the Trustees of the Harbour of Polperro, in the County of Cornwall, and vesting the Harbour in them, and for the improvement, maintenance, and regulation of the Harbour.	
	Whitelinks Harbour Order 1894 Order for the construction, maintenance, and regulation of a Harbour at Whitelinks, in the parish of Rathen, in the county of Aberdeen.	
Pier and Harbour Orders Confirmation (No. 3) Act 1894	57 & 58 Vict. c. cxii	20 July 1894
An Act to confirm certain Provisional Orders made by the Board of Trade under the General Pier and Harbour Act, 1861, relating to Avoch, Burnmouth, Loch Efort, and Poole.
	Avoch Harbour Order 1894 Order for the construction and maintenance and regulation of a Pier and Works at the Harbour of Avoch, in the County of Ross and Cromarty.	
	Burnmouth Harbour Order 1894 Order for the Construction and Maintenance of Works at the Harbour of Burnmouth, in the Parishes of Ayton and Mordington and County of Berwick, and for the Regulation of the Harbour.	
	Loch Efort Pier Order 1894 Order for the construction, maintenance, and regulation of a Pier in Loch Efort in the Island and Parish of North Uist, in the County of Inverness.	
	Poole Harbour Order 1894 Order for the Construction of Works for the Improvement of Poole Harbour, and for conferring further Powers upon the Mayor, Aldermen, and Burgesses of the Borough of Poole in relation thereto.	
Pier and Harbour Order Confirmation (No. 4) Act 1894	57 & 58 Vict. c. cxiii	20 July 1894
An Act to confirm a Provisional Order made by the Board of Trade under the General Pier and Harbour Act, 1861, relating to Montrose.
	Montrose Harbour Order 1894 Order for amending the Montrose Harbour Acts and Order, 1837–1878; and for conferring further Powers on the Trustees of that Harbour.	
Electric Lighting Orders Confirmation (No. 3) Act 1894	57 & 58 Vict. c. cxiv	20 July 1894
An Act to confirm certain Provisional Orders made by the Board of Trade under the Electric Lighting Acts, 1882 and 1888, relating to Crystal Palace District, Oswestry, Plymouth, Shropshire (Shrewsbury), Wakefield, and Yeadon.
	Crystal Palace District Electric Lighting Order 1894 Provisional Order granted by the Board of Trade under the Electric Lighting Acts 1882, and 1888, to the Crystal Palace District Electric Supply Company, Limited, in respect of the Crystal Palace District.	
	Oswestry Electric Lighting Order 1894 Provisional Order granted by the Board of Trade under the Electric Lighting Acts 1882 and 1888 to the Oswestry Electric Lighting and Power Company Limited in respect of the Borough of Oswestry.	
	Plymouth Corporation Electric Lighting Order 1894 Provisional Order granted by the Board of Trade under the Electric Lighting Acts 1882 and 1888 to the Mayor Aldermen and Burgesses of the Borough of Plymouth in respect of the Borough of Plymouth.	
	Shropshire Electric Light and Power Company Electric Lighting (Shrewsbury) Order 1894 Provisional Order granted by the Board of Trade under the Electric Lighting Acts 1882 and 1888 to the Shropshire Electric Light and Power Company Limited in respect of the borough of Shrewsbury.	
	Wakefield Corporation Electric Lighting Order 1894 Provisional Order granted by the Board of Trade under the Electric Lighting Acts 1882 and 1888 to the Mayor Aldermen and Citizens of the City of Wakefield in respect of the City of Wakefield.	
	Yeadon Electric Lighting Order 1894 Provisional Order granted by the Board of Trade under the Electric Lighting Acts 1882 and 1888 to the Yeadon Local Board in the County of York.	
Electric Lighting Orders Confirmation (No. 4) Act 1894	57 & 58 Vict. c. cxv	20 July 1894
An Act to confirm certain Provisional Orders made by the Board of Trade under the Electric Lighting Acts, 1882 and 1888, relating to Aberdare, Birmingham, Chelmsford, and Guildford.
	Aberdare Electric Lighting Order 1894 Provisional Order granted by the Board of Trade under the Electric Lighting Acts 1882, and 1888, to J. C. Howell, Limited, in respect of the Parish of Aberdare in the County of Glamorgan.	
	Birmingham Electric Light and Power Order 1894 Provisional Order granted by the Board of Trade under the Electric Lighting Acts 1882 and 1888 to the Birmingham Electric Supply Company Limited in respect of a portion of the City of Birmingham.	
	Chelmsford Electric Lighting Order 1894 Provisional Order granted by the Board of Trade under the Electric Lighting Acts 1882 and 1888 to Crompton and Company Limited in respect of the Borough of Chelmsford in the County of Essex.	
	Guildford Electric Lighting Order 1894 Provisional Order granted by the Board of Trade under the Electric Lighting Acts 1882 and 1888 to the Holloway Electricity Supply Company Limited in respect of the Borough of Guildford.	
Electric Lighting Orders Confirmation (No. 5) Act 1894	57 & 58 Vict. c. cxvi	20 July 1894
An Act to confirm certain Provisional Orders made by the Board of Trade under the Electric Lighting Acts, 1882 and 1888, relating to Clonmel and Moss Side (Collier Marr).
	Clonmel Corporation Electric Lighting Order 1894 Provisional Order granted by the Board of Trade under the Electric Lighting Acts 1882 and 1888 to the Mayor Aldermen and Burgesses of the Borough of Clonmel in respect of the Borough of Clonmel and certain portions of the District of the Clonmel Union adjacent thereto.	
	Collier Marr Moss Side Electric Lighting Order 1894 Provisional Order granted by the Board of Trade under the Electric Lighting Acts 1882 and 1888 to the Collier Marr Telephone and Electrical Manufacturing Company Limited in respect of the Urban Sanitary District of Moss Side in the County of Lancaster.	
Gas Orders Confirmation Act 1894	57 & 58 Vict. c. cxvii	20 July 1894
An Act to confirm certain Provisional Orders made by the Board of Trade under the Gas and Water Works Facilities Act, 1870, relating to Bolsover Gas, Earby and Thornton Gas, Ilford Gas, and Willenhall Gas.
	Bolsover Gas Order 1894 Order empowering the Bolsover Gas Light and Coke Company Limited to construct and maintain Gasworks and to manufacture and supply Gas in the Parish of Bolsover in the County of Derby.	
	Earby and Thornton Gas Order 1894 Order empowering the Earby and Thornton Gas and Lighting Company Limited to maintain and continue Gasworks and to manufacture and supply Gas in the Parish of Thornton-n-Craven in the West Riding of the County of York.	
	Ilford Gas Order 1894 Order empowering the Ilford Gas Light and Coke Company Limited to raise additional capital to purchase additional lands to construct and maintain additional works and for other purposes.	
	Willenhall Gas Order 1894 Order empowering the Willenhall Gas Company to raise additional capital and for other purposes.	
Gas Orders Confirmation (No. 2) Act 1894	57 & 58 Vict. c. cxviii	20 July 1894
An Act to confirm certain Provisional Orders made by the Board of Trade under the Gas and Water Works Facilities Act, 1870, relating to Newquay (Cornwall) Gas, North Bierley Gas, Uttoxeter Gas, and Worthing Gas.
	Newquay (Cornwall) Gas Order 1894 Order empowering the Newquay Gas Company Limited to maintain and continue Gasworks and to manufacture and supply Gas in the parishes of Saint Columb Minor and Crantock in the County of Cornwall.	
	North Bierley Gas Order 1894 Order empowering the North Bierley Gas Company to raise Additional Capital.	
	Uttoxeter Gas Order 1894 Order empowering the Uttoxeter Gasworks Limited to maintain and continue Gasworks and to manufacture and supply Gas within the Parish of Uttoxeter in the County of Stafford.	
	Worthing Gas Order 1894 Order empowering the Worthing Gaslight and Coke Company to raise Additional Capital to construct and maintain Additional Works and for other purposes.	
Water Orders Confirmation Act 1894	57 & 58 Vict. c. cxix	20 July 1894
An Act to confirm certain Provisional Orders made by the Board of Trade under the Gas and Water Works Facilities Act, 1870, relating to Bishop's Waltham Water, Blandford Water, East Surrey Water, Tilehurst, Pangbourne, and District Water, and West Cheshire Water.
	Bishop's Waltham Water Order 1894 Order empowering the Bishop's Waltham Waterworks Company Limited to maintain and continue Waterworks and to supply Water in the Parish of Bishop's Waltham in the county of Southampton.	
	Blandford Water Order 1894 Order authorising the Blandford Waterworks Company Limited to construct and maintain Waterworks and to supply Water in the parishes of Blandford Forum Bryanston Blandford Saint Mary Langton-Long-Blandford Pimperne Charlton Marshall and Spetisbury all in the County of Dorset.	
	East Surrey Water Order 1894 Order empowering the East Surrey Water Company to Purchase additional Lands by Agreement and to raise additional Capital.	
	Tilehurst, Pangbourne and District Water Order 1894 Order empowering the Tilehurst Pangbourne and District Water Company Limited to construct and maintain Waterworks and to supply Water in the Parishes of Sulham and Purley and parts of the Parishes of Tilehurst Pangbourne Tidmarsh Whitchurch and Englefield all in the County of Berks.	
	West Cheshire Water Order 1894 Order extending the limits of supply of the West Cheshire Water Company.	
Local Government Board's Provisional Orders Confirmation (No. 7) Act 1894	57 & 58 Vict. c. cxx	20 July 1894
An Act to confirm certain Provisional Orders of the Local Government Board relating to the Urban Sanitary Districts of Bradford (Yorks) and Saint George, and the Rural Sanitary Districts of the Belper Union, the Bromsgrove Union, the Wakefield Union, and the Township of Saddleworth.
	Belper Union Order 1894 Provisional Order to enable the Sanitary Authority for the Rural Sanitary District of the Belper Union to put in force the Compulsory Clauses of the Lands Clauses Acts.	
	Bradford (Yorks) Order 1894 Provisional Order to enable the Urban Sanitary Authority for the Borough of Bradford (Yorks) to put in force the Compulsory Clauses of the Lands Clauses Acts.	
	Bromsgrove Union (Webheath) Order 1894 Provisional Order to enable the Sanitary Authority for the Rural Sanitary District of the Bromsgrove Union to put in force the Compulsory Clauses of the Lands Clauses Acts.	
	Saddleworth Township Order 1894 Provisional Order to enable the Sanitary Authority for the Rural Sanitary District of the Township of Saddleworth to put in force the Compulsory Clauses of the Lands Clauses Acts.	
	Saint George Order 1894 Provisional Order to enable the Sanitary Authority for the Urban Sanitary District of Saint George to put in force the Compulsory Clauses of the Lands Clauses Acts.	
	Wakefield Union Order 1894 Provisional Order to enable the Sanitary Authority for the Rural Sanitary District of the Wakefield Union to put in force the Compulsory Clauses of the Lands Clauses Acts.	
Local Government Board's Provisional Orders Confirmation (No. 9) Act 1894	57 & 58 Vict. c. cxxi	20 July 1894
An Act to confirm certain Provisional Orders of the Local Government Board relating to the Chorley, the Fulstone and Hepworth, the Leigh, and the Pontefract Joint Hospital Distiicta
	Chorley Joint Hospital Order 1894 Provisional Order for forming a United District under Section 279 of the Public Health Act, 1875.	
	Fulstone and Hepworth Joint Hospital Provisional Order for forming a United District under Section 279 of the Public Health Act, 1875.	
	Leigh Joint Hospital Order 1894 Provisional Order for forming a United District under Section 279 of the Public Health Act, 1875.	
	Pontefract Joint Hospital Order 1894 Provisional Order for forming a United District under Section 279 of the Public Health Act, 1875.	
Local Government Board's Provisional Orders Confirmation (No. 10) Act 1894	57 & 58 Vict. c. cxxii	20 July 1894
An Act to confirm certain Provisional Orders of the Local Government Board relating to the Urban Sanitary Districts of Abram, Stockport, and Wilsden.
	Abram Order 1894 Provisional Order to enable the Sanitary Authority for the Urban Sanitary District of Abram to put in force the Compulsory Clauses of the Lands Clauses Acts.	
	Stockport Order (No. 2) 1894 Provisional Order to enable the Urban Sanitary Authority for the Borough of Stockport to put in force the Compulsory Clauses of the Lands Clauses Acts.	
	Wilsden Order 1894 Provisional Order to enable the Sanitary Authority for the Urban Sanitary District of Wilsden to put in force the Compulsory Clauses of the Lands Clauses Acts.	
Local Government Board's Provisional Orders Confirmation (No. 11) Act 1894	57 & 58 Vict. c. cxxiii	20 July 1894
An Act to confirm certain Provisional Orders of the Local Government Board relating to the Urban Sanitary Districts of Birmingham, Brighton, Burnley, Darwen, Lancaster, and Sheffield.
	Birmingham Order 1894 Provisional Order for altering the Birmingham Corporation (Consolidation) Act, 1883. (Note: Birmingham Corporation (Consolidation) Act 1883 (46 & 47 Vict. c. lxx))	
	Brighton Pavilion Order 1894 Provisional Order for altering certain Local Acts and a Confirming Act. (Note: Local Government Board's Provisional Orders Confirmation (No. 8) Act 1891 (54 & 55 Vict. c. lxx))	
	Burnley Order (No. 2) 1894 Provisional Order for altering the Burnley Borough Improvement Act, 1871. (Note: Burnley Borough Improvement Act 1871 (34 & 35 Vict. c. cliv))	
	Darwen Order 1894 Provisional Order for partially repealing and altering certain Local Acts and a Confirming Act. (Note: Local Government Board's Provisional Orders Confirmation (No. 11) Act 1893 (56 & 57 Vict. c. cxx))	
	Lancaster Order 1894 Provisional Order for altering certain Local Acts and a Confirming Act. (Note: Local Government Board's Provisional Orders Confirmation (No. 6) Act 1886 (50 Vict. c. viii))	
	Sheffield Order 1894 Provisional Order for altering the Sheffield Corporation Act, 1890. (Note: Sheffield Corporation Act 1890 (53 & 54 Vict. c. ccxxv))	
Local Government Board's Provisional Orders Confirmation (No. 12) Act 1894	57 & 58 Vict. c. cxxiv	20 July 1894
An Act to confirm certain Provisional Orders of the Local Government Board relating to the Counties of the Isle of Wight, London, and West Sussex, and to the Boroughs of Margate and Tunbridge Wells.
	Isle of Wight Order 1894 Provisional Order made in pursuance of sub-section (2) of Section 69 of the Local Government Act, 1888. (Note: Local Government Act 1888 (51 & 52 Vict. c. 41))	
	County of London (Common Lodging Houses) Order 1894 Provisional Order under Section 10 of the Local Government Act, 1888.	
	Borough of Margate Order (No. 2) 1894 Provisional Order made in pursuance of Sections 54 and 59 of the Local Government Act, 1888.	
	Borough of Tunbridge Wells Order 1894 Provisional Order made in pursuance of Sections 54 and 59 of the Local Government Act, 1888.	
	West Sussex Order 1894 Provisional Order made in pursuance of sub-section (2) of Section 69 of the Local Government Act, 1888.	
Local Government Board's Provisional Orders Confirmation (No. 13) Act 1894	57 & 58 Vict. c. cxxv	20 July 1894
An Act to confirm certain Provisional Orders of the Local Government Board relating to the Isle of Thanet and Stone Joint Hospital Districts, and to the Leigh and Atherton and the Stalybridge and Dukinfield Joint Sewerage Districts.
	Isle of Thanet Joint Hospital Order 1894 Provisional Order for altering a Confirming Act. (Note: Local Government Board's Provisional Orders Confirmation (No. 14) Act 1893 (56 & 57 Vict. c. cxxxi))	
	Leigh and Atherton Joint Sewerage Order 1894 Provisional Order for forming a United District under Section 279 of the Public Health Act, 1875.	
	Stalybridge and Dukinfield Joint Sewerage Order 1894 Provisional Order for forming a United District under Section 279 of the Public Health Act, 1875.	
	Stone Joint Hospital Order 1894 Provisional Order for forming a United District under Section 279 of the Public Health Act, 1875.	
Local Government Board's Provisional Orders Confirmation (No. 16) Act 1894	57 & 58 Vict. c. cxxvi	20 July 1894
An Act to confirm certain Provisional Orders of the Local Government Board relating to the Urban Sanitary Districts of Middleton and Preston.
	Middleton Order 1894 Provisional Order for altering a Local Act (Note: Middleton and Tonge Improvement Act 1861 (24 & 25 Vict. c. c)) and certain Confirming Acts.	
	Preston Order 1894 Provisional Order for altering certain Local Acts and a Confirming Act. (Note: Local Government Supplemental Act 1861 (24 & 25 Vict. c. 39))	
Local Government Board's Provisional Order Confirmation (No. 19) Act 1894 (repealed)	57 & 58 Vict. c. cxxvii	20 July 1894
An Act to confirm a Provisional Order of the Local Government Board relating to the Haslingden, Rawtenstall, and Bacup Outfall Sewerage District. (Repealed by County of Lancashire Act 1984 (c. xxi))
	Haslingden, Rawtenstall, and Bacup Outfall Sewerage District Order 1894 Provisional Order for altering a Confirming Act. (Note: Local Government Board's Provisional Orders Confirmation (No. 7) Act 1890 (53 & 54 Vict. c. lxxxv))	
Local Government Board's Provisional Order Confirmation (Poor Law) Act 1894	57 & 58 Vict. c. cxxviii	29 July 1894
An Act to confirm a Provisional Order of the Local Government Board, under the provisions of the Poor Law Act, 1889, (Note: Poor Law Act 1889 (52 & 53 Vict. c. 56)) and the Public Health Act, 1875, relating to the Metropolitan Asylum District.
	Metropolitan Asylum District Order 1894 Provisional Order to enable the Managers of the Metropolitan Asylum District to put in force the Compulsory Clauses of the Lands Clauses Acts.	
Local Government Board's Provisional Orders Confirmation (No. 14) Act 1894	57 & 58 Vict. c. cxxix	31 July 1894
An Act to confirm certain Provisional Orders of the Local Government Board relating to the Urban Sanitary Districts of Blackburn, Blackpool (two), and Stalybridge, and to the Rural Sanitary District of the Blackburn Union.
	Blackburn Order 1894 Provisional Order for altering certain Local Acts and a Confirming Act. (Note: Local Government Board's Provisional Orders Confirmation (No. 13) Act 1889 (52 & 53 Vict. c. cxv))	
	Blackburn Union Order 1894 Provisional Order to enable the Sanitary Authority for the Rural Sanitary District of the Blackburn Union to put in force the Compulsory Clauses of the Lands Clauses Acts.	
	Blackpool Order 1894 Provisional Order to enable the Urban Sanitary Authority for the Borough of Blackpool to put in force the Compulsory Clauses of the Lands Clauses Acts.	
	Blackpool Order (No. 2) 1894 Provisional Order for altering the Blackpool Improvement Act, 1865, (Note: Blackpool Improvement Act 1865 (28 & 29 Vict. c. ccxiv)) and partially repealing and altering certain Confirming Acts.	
	Stalybridge Order 1894 Provisional Order for partially repealing a Confirming Act.	
Local Government Board's Provisional Order Confirmation (No. 17) Act 1894	57 & 58 Vict. c. cxxx	31 July 1894
An Act to confirm a Provisional Order of the Local Government Board relating to the County of Dorset.
	Dorset (Portland Ferry Bridge) Order 1894 Provisional Order under Section 10 of the Local Government Act, 1888.	
Local Government Board's Provisional Orders Confirmation (No. 18) Act 1894	57 & 58 Vict. c. cxxxi	31 July 1894
An Act to confirm certain Provisional Orders of the Local Government Board relating to the Urban Sanitary District of King's Lynn (two), the Burnley Joint Hospital District, and the West Kent Main Sewerage District.
	Burnley Joint Hospital Order 1894 Provisional Order for altering a Confirming Act. (Note: Local Government Board's Provisional Orders Confirmation (No. 4) Act 1886)	
	King's Lynn Order 1894 Provisional Order for partially repealing and altering certain Local Acts.	
	King's Lynn Order (No. 2) 1894 Provisional Order to enable the Urban Sanitary Authority for the Borough of Kings Lynn to put in force the Compulsory Clauses of the Lands Clauses Acts.	
	West Kent Main Sewerage Order 1894 Provisional Order for altering certain Local Acts.	
London Tramways Company (Limited) Act 1894	57 & 58 Vict. c. cxxxii	31 July 1894
An Act to authorise the London Tramways Company (Limited) to extend their tramways and for other purposes.
South Eastern Railway Act 1894	57 & 58 Vict. c. cxxxiii	31 July 1894
An Act to confer further powers on the South Eastern Railway Company and for other purposes.
Accrington District Gas and Water Board Act 1894 (repealed)	57 & 58 Vict. c. cxxxiv	31 July 1894
An Act to constitute and incorporate a Gas and Water Board for the Borough of Accrington and the Districts of the Local Boards of Church Clayton-le-Moors Great Harwood and Rishton in the County Palatine of Lancaster to transfer to and vest in such Board the undertaking of the Accrington Gas and Waterworks Company and lor other purposes. (Repealed by County of Lancashire Act 1984 (c. xxi))
Huddersfield Waterworks Tramroad Act 1894 (repealed)	57 & 58 Vict. c. cxxxv	31 July 1894
An Act to empower the Mayor Aldermen and Burgesses of the Borough of Huddersfield to construct a temporary Tramroad for the purposes of their Waterworks Undertaking. (Repealed by West Yorkshire Act 1980 (c. xiv))
Lancashire, Derbyshire and East Coast Railway Act 1894	57 & 58 Vict. c. cxxxvi	31 July 1894
An Act to confer further Powers on the Lancashire Derbyshire and East Coast Railway Company in relation to their authorised Railways and Works to extend the time for purchasing land and completing some of those Railways and for other purposes.
Fishguard and Rosslare Railways and Harbours Act 1894	57 & 58 Vict. c. cxxxvii	31 July 1894
An Act to vest the undertakings of the Waterford and Wexford Railway Company and of the Rosslare Harbour Commissioners in the Fishguard and Rosslare Railways and Harbours Company to authorise that Company to raise additional Capital to change their name and for other purposes.
King's Lynn Corporation Act 1894	57 & 58 Vict. c. cxxxviii	31 July 1894
An Act to enable the Mayor Aldermen and Burgesses of the Borough of King's Lynn to exercise further powers for the removal of wrecks and to raise additional Moneys for the removal of the wreck of the ship "Wick Bay" and for other purposes.
Mersey Railway Act 1894	57 & 58 Vict. c. cxxxix	31 July 1894
An Act for the abandonment of certain railways authorised by the Mersey Railway Acts 1885 (Note: Mersey Railway Act 1885 (48 & 49 Vict. c. cxcviii)) and 1887 (Note: Mersey Railway Act 1887 (50 & 51 Vict. c. cxciii)) and for other purposes.
Newcastle-upon-Tyne Corporation (Byker Bridge, &c.) Act 1894 (repealed)	57 & 58 Vict. c. cxl	31 July 1894
An Act to provide for the transfer to the Mayor Aldermen and Citizens of the city and county of Newcastle-upon-Tyne of the undertaking of the Byker Bridge Company and for certain payments to the North Eastern Railway Company under an agreement dated the eleventh day of April one thousand eight hundred and eighty-eight for the passage of foot passengers free of toll along the Railway Bridge over the Ouseburn Valley and for other purposes. (Repealed by Tyne and Wear Act 1980 (c. xliii))
Port Talbot Railway and Docks Act 1894	57 & 58 Vict. c. cxli	31 July 1894
An Act to dissolve and re-incorporate and to confer further powers upon the Port Talbot Company and to authorise them to construct an additional Dock and Railways and for other purposes.
Star Life Assurance Society's Act 1894 (repealed)	57 & 58 Vict. c. cxlii	31 July 1894
An Act to authorise the payment from time to time of Interim Bonus by the Star Life Assurance Society to the holders of certain Policies. (Repealed by Star Assurance Society's Act 1911 (1 & 2 Geo. 5. c. lxix))
Great Western Railway (No. 1) Act 1894	57 & 58 Vict. c. cxliii	31 July 1894
An Act for conferring further powers upon the Great Western Railway Company in respect of their own undertaking and upon that Company and the London and North Western Railway Company in respect of undertakings in which they are jointly interested for amalgamating the Tiverton and North Devon and the Oldbury Railway Companies with the Great Western Railway Company and for other purposes.
Brighton, Rottingdean, and Newhaven Direct Railway (Abandonment) Act 1894 (repealed)	57 & 58 Vict. c. cxliv	31 July 1894
An Act for the abandonment of the Brighton Rottingdean and Newhaven Direct Railway (Repealed by Statute Law (Repeals) Act 2013 (c. 2))
River Suck Drainage Act 1894	57 & 58 Vict. c. cxlv	31 July 1894
An Act for amending the River Suck Drainage Act 1889 (Note: River Suck Drainage Act 1889 (52 & 53 Vict. c. ccv)) and for other purposes.
Caledonian Railway Act 1894	57 & 58 Vict. c. cxlvi	31 July 1894
An Act to confer further powers on the Caledonian Railway Company in relation to their own Undertaking and on them and the Glasgow and South Western Railway Company in relation to the Glasgow Barrhead and Kilmarnock Joint Line to confirm an agreement with the Trustees of the late Robert Haldane to provide for the acquisition by the Caledonian Railway Company of the Forfar and Brechin Railway and for other purposes.
Sheffield and South Yorkshire Navigation Act 1894	57 & 58 Vict. c. cxlvii	31 July 1894
An Act to extend the time for the compulsory acquisition of Lands under the provisions of the Sheffield and South Yorkshire Navigation Act 1889 (Note: Sheffield and South Yorkshire Navigation Act 1889 (52 & 53 Vict. c. cxc)) and to make further provisions with respect to the Transfer to the Sheffield and South Yorkshire Navigation Company of certain of the Canal Undertakings of the Manchester Sheffield and Lincolnshire Railway Company.
Lancashire and Yorkshire Railway Act 1894	57 & 58 Vict. c. cxlviii	31 July 1894
An Act for conferring further Powers on the Lancashire and Yorkshire Railway Company with relation to their own Undertaking and upon that Company and the London and North Western Railway Company with relation to the Preston and Wyre Railway and for other purposes.
Easton and Church Hope Railway (Extension of Time) Act 1894	57 & 58 Vict. c. cxlix	31 July 1894
An Act to extend the time for the completion of the authorised railways of the Easton and Church Hope Railway Company and for other purposes.
Midland Great Western Railway of Ireland Act 1894 (repealed)	57 & 58 Vict. c. cl	31 July 1894
An Act to confer further powers on the Midland Great Western Railway of Ireland Company and for other purposes. (Repealed by Statute Law (Repeals) Act 2013 (c. 2))
Edinburgh North Bridge Improvement Act 1894 (repealed)	57 & 58 Vict. c. cli	31 July 1894
An Act to authorise the Lord Provost Magistrates and Council of the City of Edinburgh to widen alter and improve North Bridge and North Bridge Street within the said City to acquire lands to make a new road and for other purposes. (Repealed by Edinburgh Corporation Order Confirmation Act 1933 (24 & 25 Geo. 5. c. v))
North British Railway Act 1894	57 & 58 Vict. c. clii	31 July 1894
An Act to authorise the North British Railway Company to construct new Railways and acquire additional lands and to empower that Company and the Kirkcaldy and District Railway Company to widen a certain bridge to extend the time limited by certain Acts for the compulsory purchase of lands and the completion of works to abandon portion of an authorised Railway to confirm an Agreement between the Caledonian Railway Company the Great North of Scotland Railway Company the Aberdeen Joint Station Committee and the North British Railway Company as to the use by the latter Company of the joint passenger station at Aberdeen to confirm certain other Agreements between the Corporation of Edinburgh the Bank of Scotland the Edinburgh School Board and the North British Railway Company to make provisions for the prevention of trespass and for other purposes.
North Eastern Railway Act 1894	57 & 58 Vict. c. cliii	31 July 1894
An Act to confer additional powers upon the North Eastern Railway Company and upon that Company and the London and Northwestern Railway Company for the construction of new Railways and other Works and the acquisition of additional Lands for transferring to the North Eastern Railway Company the powers of the Wear Valley Extension Railway Company and for other purposes,
Bute Docks Act 1894	57 & 58 Vict. c. cliv	31 July 1894
An Act for empowering the Bute Docks Company to construct Seawalls or Embankments and a new Dock and other works and to raise additional capital and for amending the Bute Docks Acts and for other purposes.
Bristol Tramways Act 1894	57 & 58 Vict. c. clv	31 July 1894
An Act to authorise the Bristol Tramways and Carriage Company Limited to make additional Tramways and to confer further powers upon that Company.
West Highland Railway Act 1894 or the West Highland Railway (Mallaig Extension) Act 1894	57 & 58 Vict. c. clvi	31 July 1894
An Act to empower the West Highland Railway Company to construct an Extension of their Railway from Banavie to Mallaig with a Pier and other Works in connection therewith and for other purposes.
Aberdeen District Tramways Act 1894 (repealed)	57 & 58 Vict. c. clvii	17 August 1894
An Act to authorise the Aberdeen District Tramways Company to construct additional Tramways to amend the Acts relating to the Company and for other purposes. (Repealed by Aberdeen Corporation (Water, Gas, Electricity and Transport) Order Confirmation Act 1937 (1 Edw. 8 & 1 Geo. 6. c. cii))
Consett Waterworks Act 1894	57 & 58 Vict. c. clviii	17 August 1894
An Act to confer further powers on the Consett Waterworks Company and for other purposes.
Dundee Suburban Railway Act 1894	57 & 58 Vict. c. clix	17 August 1894
An Act to extend the time for the completion of the Dundee Suburban Railway and for other purposes.
Liverpool Corporation Loans Act 1894 (repealed)	57 & 58 Vict. c. clx	17 August 1894
An Act for making improved provisions with reference to the exercise by the Corporation of the City of Liverpool of their Statutory Borrowing Powers and for other purposes. (Repealed by Liverpool Corporation Act 1921 (11 & 12 Geo. 5. c. lxxiv))
Cardiff Corporation Act 1894	57 & 58 Vict. c. clxi	17 August 1894
An Act to enable the Mayor Aldermen and Burgesses of the County Borough of Cardiff to construct and maintain additional Waterworks Street Road and Bridge Improvements and to make further provisions for the improvement health and good government of the Borough and for other purposes.
East London Waterworks Act 1894	57 & 58 Vict. c. clxii	17 August 1894
An Act to authorise the East London Waterworks Company to execute further Works and to raise further Money in order to enable them to fulfil their statutory obligations relating to the supply of water or otherwise and to meet the increased demand for water within their district to give effect to an Agreement between the Company and the persons entitled to or claiming Lammas or Common Rights over certain Lands acquired by the Company in the Parish of Low Leyton otherwise Saint Mary Leyton in the County of Essex to confer further powers upon and make further provision with respect to the Undertaking of the Company and to amend the Acts relating to them and for other purposes.
London County Council (Money) Act 1894 (repealed)	57 & 58 Vict. c. clxiii	17 August 1894
An Act to regulate the Expenditure of Money by the London County Council on capital account during the current financial period and the Raising of Money to meet such Elxpenditure. (Repealed by London County Council (Finance Consolidation) Act 1912 (2 & 3 Geo. 5. c. cv))
Southwark and Vauxhall Water Act 1894	57 & 58 Vict. c. clxiv	17 August 1894
An Act to authorise the Southwark and Vauxhall Water Company to acquire Lands construct additional Works and raise additional Capital and for other purposes.
West Middlesex Waterworks Act 1894	57 & 58 Vict. c. clxv	17 August 1894
An Act to authorise the Company of Proprietors of the West Middlesex Waterworks to raise additional capital and for other purposes.
West Riding of Yorkshire Rivers Act 1894 (repealed)	57 & 58 Vict. c. clxvi	17 August 1894
An Act to make more effectual provision for preventing the pollution of the Rivers of the West Riding of Yorkshire and their tributaries. (Repealed by Statute Law (Repeals) Act 1989 (c. 43))
Barry Railway Act 1894	57 & 58 Vict. c. clxvii	17 August 1894
An Act to enable the Barry Railway Company to construct a new Railway and other works and for other purposes.
Clyde Navigation Act 1894	57 & 58 Vict. c. clxviii	17 August 1894
An Act to extend the Periods limited by the Clyde Navigation Act 1891 (Note: Clyde Navigation Act 1891 (54 & 55 Vict. c. xxxviii)) for the Compulsory Purchase of Lands and for the completion of the Railway thereby authorised to confer further powers on the Trustees of the Clyde Navigation with respect to Rates and for other purposes.
Manchester Ship Canal Act 1894	57 & 58 Vict. c. clxix	17 August 1894
An Act to confer further powers on the Manchester Ship Canal Company.
Peterhead Harbours Act 1894 (repealed)	57 & 58 Vict. c. clxx	17 August 1894
An Act to amend the Peterhead Harbours Act 1873 (Note: Peterhead Harbours Act 1873 (36 & 37 Vict. c. clvii)) the Peterhead Harbours Amendment Act 1876 (Note: Peterhead Harbours Amendment Act 1876 (39 & 40 Vict. c. clxxiv)) and the Peterhead Harbours Order 1881 to confer further powers upon the Trustees of the Harbours of Peterhead and for other purposes. (Repealed by Peterhead Harbours Order Confirmation Act 1992 (c. xii))
South Staffordshire Mines Drainage Act 1894	57 & 58 Vict. c. clxxi	17 August 1894
An Act to empower the South Staffordshire Mines Drainage Commissioners to impose a charge on Mines belonging to certain collieries as collateral security for money raised by them and to amend the Acts relating to the said Commissioners.
Taff Vale Railway Act 1894	57 & 58 Vict. c. clxxii	17 August 1894
An Act for empowering the Taff Vale Railway Company to construct a new Railway and other works and acquire lands for vesting in that Company the undertaking of the Cowbridge and Aberthaw Railway Company and for other purposes.
West Lancashire Railway Act 1894	57 & 58 Vict. c. clxxiii	17 August 1894
An Act to reconstitute the Board of Directors of the West Lancashire Railway Company for raising further moneys and for other purposes.
Glasgow District Subway (Further Powers) Act 1894 (repealed)	57 & 58 Vict. c. clxxiv	17 August 1894
An Act to authorise the Glasgow District Subway Company to raise additional capital to confer on them further powers with reference to their surplus lands and properties and for the acquisition of additional lands to extend the time for the completion of their authorised undertaking and for other purposes. (Repealed by Glasgow Corporation Consolidation (Water, Transport and Markets) Order Confirmation Act 1964 (c. xliii))
Preston Gas Act 1894	57 & 58 Vict. c. clxxv	17 August 1894
An Act for conferring further powers on the Preston Gas Company.
Glasgow Bridges, &c. Act 1894	57 & 58 Vict. c. clxxvi	17 August 1894
An Act to authorise the reconstruction of Glasgow Bridge the erection of a weir or tidal dam across the River Clyde the construction of tramways and for other purposes.
Great Western Railway (No. 2) Act 1894	57 & 58 Vict. c. clxxvii	17 August 1894
An Act to provide for the transfer to the Great Western Railway Company of a portion of the authorised undertaking of the Plymouth and Dartmoor Railway Company and for other purposes.
Nottingham Corporation Act 1894 (repealed)	57 & 58 Vict. c. clxxviii	17 August 1894
An Act to amend the Nottingham Corporation Loans Act 1880 (Note: Nottingham Corporation Loans Act 1880 (43 & 44 Vict. c. ccviii)) and for other purposes. (Repealed by Statute Law (Repeals) Act 1995 (c. 44))
Oxford and Aylesbury Tramroad Act 1894	57 & 58 Vict. c. clxxix	17 August 1894
An Act to empower the Oxford and Aylesbury Tramroad Company to deviate part of the tramroad authorised by the Oxford and Aylesbury Tramroad Act 1888 (Note: Oxford and Aylesbury Tramroad Act 1888 (51 & 52 Vict. c. clxxxv)) as amended by the Oxford and Aylesbury Tramroad Act 1892 (Note: Oxford and Aylesbury Tramroad Act 1892 (55 & 56 Vict. c. cxxxvii)) to revive the powers and extend the time for the Purchase of Lands for and for the completion of the remainder of the said Tramroad authorised by the said Acts and for other purposes.
Queen's Ferry Bridge Act 1894 (repealed)	57 & 58 Vict. c. clxxx	17 August 1894
An Act to authorise the Construction of a Bridge over the River Dee at Queen's Ferry in the County of Flint and the discontinuance of the existing Ferry at that place to make provision with respect to the Maintenance and Repair of Roads now repairable by the Dee Land Company in the Counties of Flint and Chester and the City of Chester and for other purposes. (Repealed by Clwyd County Council Act 1985 (c. xliv))
Swindon Water Act 1894	57 & 58 Vict. c. clxxxi	17 August 1894
An Act to enable the Local Boards for the districts of Old Swindon and of Swindon New Town both in the county of Wilts to acquire and vest the Undertaking of the Swindon Waterworks Company Limited in a Water Board to authorise the construction of Additional Waterworks for the supply of Water and for other purposes.
Bangor Corporation (Pier, &c.) Act 1894	57 & 58 Vict. c. clxxxii	17 August 1894
An Act to empower the Mayor Aldermen and Burgesses of the Borough of Bangor to construct a Pier and other works to maintain improve enlarge and extend the Garth Wharf Jetty to acquire the Garth Ferry and to improve and extend the Landing Place connected therewith situate in the parish of Llandegfan and County of Anglesey and for other purposes.
Tramways Capital Guarantee Company Act 1894	57 & 58 Vict. c. clxxxiii	17 August 1894
An Act to make provision as to the funds held in trust for the holders of certificates guaranteed by the Tramways Capital Guarantee Company Limited and for other purposes.
Central Middlesex Water Act 1894	57 & 58 Vict. c. clxxxiv	17 August 1894
An Act to authorise the Central Middlesex Water Company Limited to sell and transfer a portion of their Undertaking to the Colne Valley Water Company and for other purposes.
London County Council (Improvements) Act 1894	57 & 58 Vict. c. clxxxv	17 August 1894
An Act to empower the London County Council to make Street Improvements to Purchase Lands and to acquire the Garden in Lincoln's Inn Fields to Extend the Time Limited for certain authorised Improvements and for other Purposes.
North Cornwall Railway Act 1894	57 & 58 Vict. c. clxxxvi	17 August 1894
An Act to authorise the North Cornwall Railway Company to deviate certain parts of their Railway and to construct new Railways and for other purposes.
Thames Conservancy Act 1894 (repealed)	57 & 58 Vict. c. clxxxvii	17 August 1894
An Act to amend the constitution of and consolidate amend and extend the Statutory Powers of the Conservators of the River Thames to make further provision for the preservation and improvement of the said River for purposes of Navigation for Profit and Pleasure and as a Source of Water Supply for the Metropolis and the Suburbs thereof and for other purposes. (Repealed by Port of London Act 1908 (8 Edw. 7. c. 68), Thames Conservancy (Appointments and Tolls) Provisional Order Act 1910 (10 Edw. 7 & 1 Geo. 5. c. cxxxiii), Thames Conservancy Act 1911 (1 & 2 Geo. 5. c. lvii), Port of London Act 1917 (7 & 8 Geo. 5. c. xliv), Port of London (Consolidation) Act 1920 (10 & 11 Geo. 5. c. clxxiii), Thames Conservancy Act 1921 (11 & 12 Geo. 5. c. lxxx), Thames Conservancy Act 1924 (14 & 15 Geo. 5. c. lxiv) and Thames Conservancy Act 1932 (22 & 23 Geo. 5. c. xxxvii))
Plymouth and Dartmoor Railway Act 1894	57 & 58 Vict. c. clxxxviii	17 August 1894
An Act to revive the Powers and Extend the Time for the Compulsory Purchase of Land and Completion of Works authorised by the Plymouth and Dartmoor Railway Act 1883 (Note: Plymouth and Dartmoor Railway Act 1883 (46 & 47 Vict. c. cxxxix)) the Plymouth and Dartmoor Railway (South Hams Extension) Act 1888 (Note: Plymouth and Dartmoor Railway (South Hams Extension) Act 1888 (51 & 52 Vict. c. liii)) and the Plymouth and Dartmoor Railway Act 1891 (Note: Plymouth and Dartmoor Railway Act 1891 (54 & 55 Vict. c. lxxiii)) and for other purposes.
Great Western and Midland Railways (Severn and Wye and Severn Bridge Railway) Act 1894	57 & 58 Vict. c. clxxxix	17 August 1894
An Act for vesting in the Great Western and Midland Railway Companies the undertaking of the Severn and Wye and Severn Bridge Railway Company and for other purposes.
Exeter, Teign Valley, and Chagford Railway (Extension of Time) Act 1894	57 & 58 Vict. c. cxc	17 August 1894
An Act to revive the Powers and further extend the Time for the compulsory purchase of Lands and to extend the Time limited for the completion of the Exeter Teign Valley and Chagford Railway.
Tramways Orders Confirmation (No. 1) Act 1894	57 & 58 Vict. c. cxci	17 August 1894
An Act to confirm certain Provisional Orders made by the Board of Trade under the Tramways Act, 1870, (Note: Tramways Act 1870 (33 & 34 Vict. c. 78)) relating to Barrow-in-Furness Corporation Tramways, Liverpool and Walton-on the-Hill Tramways, and Liverpool Corporation Tramways (Extensions).
	Barrow-in-Furness Corporation Tramways Order 1894 Order authorising the Mayor Aldermen and Burgesses of the Borough of Barrow-in-Furness to construct additional Tramways in the said Borough.	
	Liverpool and Walton-on-the-Hill Tramways Order 1894 Order authorising the Liverpool United Tramways and Omnibus Company to construct additional Tramways in the parish and township of Walton-on-the-Hill and for other purposes.	
	Liverpool Corporation Tramways (Extensions) Order 1894 Order authorising the Mayor Aldermen and Citizens of the City of Liverpool to construct additional Tramways in the said City.	
Tramways Orders Confirmation (No. 2) Act 1894	57 & 58 Vict. c. cxcii	17 August 1894
An Act to confirm certain Provisional Orders made by the Board of Trade under the Tramways Act, 1870, relating to Croydon Corporation Tramways, Croydon Tramways (Extensions), and South Staffordshire Tramways.
	Croydon Corporation Tramways Order 1894 Order authorising the Mayor Aldermen and Burgesses of the County Borough of Croydon to construct Tramways in the said County Borough.	
	Croydon Tramways (Extensions) Order 1894 Order authorising the Construction of Tramways in the Borough of Croydon in the County of Surrey and for other purposes.	
	South Staffordshire Tramways Order 1894 Order authorising the construction of Tramways in the Borough of West Bromwich and the Parish of Handsworth both in the County of Stafford and for other purposes.	
Local Government Board's Provisional Orders Confirmation (No. 15) Act 1894	57 & 58 Vict. c. cxciii	17 August 1894
An Act to confirm certain Provisional Orders of the Local Government Board relating to the Urban Sanitary Districts of Bolton and St. Helens, and to the Wisbech and Walsoken Main Sewerage District.
	Bolton Order (No. 2) 1894 Provisional Order for partially repealing and altering certain Local Acts and a Confirming Act. (Note: Local Government Board's Provisional Orders Confirmation (No. 11) Act 1888 (51 & 52 Vict. c. cxxxi))	
	St. Helens Order 1894 Provisional Order for altering certain Local Acts.	
	Wisbech and Walsoken Order 1894 Provisional Order for altering a Confirming Act. (Note: Public Health Supplemental Act 1857 (20 Vict. c. 3))	
Education Department Provisional Order Confirmation (London) Act 1894	57 & 58 Vict. c. cxciv	17 August 1894
An Act to confirm a Provisional Order made by the Education Department under the Elementary Education Act, 1870, (Note: Elementary Education Act 1870 (33 & 34 Vict. c. 75)) to enable the School Board for London to put in force the Lands Clauses Acts.
	London School Board Order 1894 Provisional Order for putting in force the Lands Clauses Acts.	
Education Department Provisional Orders Confirmation (Barry, &c.) Act 1894	57 & 58 Vict. c. cxcv	17 August 1894
An Act to confirm certain Provisional Orders made by the Education Department under the Elementary Education Act, 1870, to enable the School Boards for Barry United District, Brotherton, Hornsey, Low Leyton, Liverpool, Sutton (Surrey), West Ham, Willesden, and York to put in force the Lands Clauses Acts.
	Barry (Glamorgan) School Board Order 1894 Provisional Order for putting in force the Lands Clauses Acts.	
	Brotherton (Yorks. West Riding) School Board Order 1894 Provisional Order for putting in force the Lands Clauses Acts.	
	Hornsey (Middlesex) Order 1894 Provisional Order for putting in force the Lands Clauses Acts.	
	Low Leyton (Essex) School Board Order 1894 Provisional Order for putting in force the Lands Clauses Acts.	
	Liverpool School Board Order 1894 Provisional Order for putting in force the Lands Clauses Acts.	
	Sutton (Surrey) School Board Order 1894 Provisional Order for putting in force the Lands Clauses Acts.	
	West Ham (Essex) School Board Order 1894 Provisional Order for putting in force the Lands Clauses Acts.	
	Willesden (Middlesex) School Board Order 1894 Provisional Order for putting in force the Lands Clauses Acts.	
	York School Board Order 1894 Provisional Order for putting in force the Lands Clauses Acts.	
Canal Tolls and Charges, No. 1 (Canals of the Great Northern and certain other Railway Companies) Order Confirmation Act 1894	57 & 58 Vict. c. cxcvi	17 August 1894
An Act to confirm a Provisional Order made by the Board of Trade under the Railway and Canal Traffic Act, 1888, containing the Classification of Merchandise Traffic, and the Schedule of Maximum Tolls and Charges applicable thereto, for the Canals of the Great Northern and certain other Railway Companies.
	Canals Tolls and Charges, No. 1 (Canals of the Great Northern and certain other Railway Companies) Order 1894 Order of the Board of Trade under the Railway and Canal Traffic Act, 1888, embodying the Classification of Merchandise Traffic and the authorised Schedule of Maximum Tolls and Charges, including all Wharfage Charges applicable to the said Classification for the Canals of the Great Northern Railway Company, the Joint Committee of the Great Northern Railway Company and the Great Eastern Railway Company, the Great Western Railway Company, the Lancashire and Yorkshire Railway Company, the London and North Western Railway Company, the Manchester, Sheffield, and Lincolnshire Railway Company, the Midland Railway Company, the North Eastern Railway Company, and the North Staffordshire Railway Company.	
Canal Rates, Tolls and Charges, No. 2 (Bridgewater, &c. Canals) Order Confirmation Act 1894	57 & 58 Vict. c. cxcvii	17 August 1894
An Act to confirm a Provisional Order made by the Board of Trade under the Railway and Canal Traffic Act, 1888, containing the Classification of Merchandise Traffic, and the Schedule of Maximum Rates, Tolls, and Charges applicable thereto, for the Bridgewater Canals Undertaking of the Manchester Ship Canal Company, and for certain other Canals.
	Canal Rates, Tolls and Charges, No. 2 (Bridgewater, &c.) Order 1894 Order of the Board of Trade under the Railway and Canal Traffic Act, 1888, embodying the Classification of Merchandise Traffic and the authorised Schedule of Maximum Rates, Tolls, and Charges, including all Terminal and Wharfage Charges applicable to the said Classification for the Bridgewater Canals Undertaking of the Manchester Ship Canal Company, (Note: Bridgewater Canal) the Glamorganshire Canal, (Note: Glamorganshire Canal) the River Larke, (Note: River Larke) the Medway (Upper) Navigation, (Note: Medway (Upper) Navigation) the Rochdale Canal, (Note: Rochdale Canal) the Trent Navigation, (Note: Trent Navigation) and the Canals of the Shropshire Union Railways and Canal Company.	
Canals Tolls and Charges, No. 3 (Aberdare, &c. Canals) Order Confirmation Act 1894	57 & 58 Vict. c. cxcviii	17 August 1894
An Act to confirm a Provisional Order made by the Board of Trade under the Railway and Canal Traffic Act, 1888, containing the Classification of Merchandise Traffic, and the Schedule of Maximum Tolls and Charges applicable thereto, for the Aberdare Canal Navigation, and certain other Canals.
	Canal Tolls and Charges, No. 3 (Aberdare, &c. Canals) Order 1894 Order of the Board of Trade under the Railway and Canal Traffic Act, 1888, embodying the Classification of Merchandise Traffic and the authorised Schedule of Maximum Tolls and Charges, including all Wharfage Charges applicable to the said Classification, for the Aberdare Canal Navigation, (Note: Aberdare Canal Navigation) the Lower Avon Navigation, (Note: Lower Avon Navigation) the Beverley Beck, (Note: Beverley Beck) the Birmingham and Warwick Junction Canal, (Note: Birmingham and Warwick Junction Canal) the Bradford Canal, (Note: Bradford Canal) the Calder and Hebble Navigation, (Note: Calder and Hebble Navigation) the Chelmer and Blackwater Navigation, (Note: Chelmer and Blackwater Navigation) the Chichester Canal, (Note: Chichester Canal) the Coventry Canal Navigation, (Note: Coventry Canal Navigation) the Derby Canal, (Note: Derby Canal) the Erewash Canal, (Note: Erewash Canal) the Gloucester and Berkeley Canal, (Note: Gloucester and Berkeley Canal) the Godalming Navigation, (Note: Godalming Navigation) the Grand Union Canal, (Note: Grand Union Canal) the Leicester Navigation, (Note: Leicester Navigation) the Leicestershire and Northamptonshire Union Canal, (Note: Leicestershire and Northamptonshire Union Canal) the Loughborough Navigation, (Note: Loughborough Navigation) the Louth Navigation Canal, (Note: Louth Navigation Canal) the Lower Medway Navigation, (Note: Lower Medway Navigation) the Neath Canal Navigation, (Note: Neath Canal Navigation) the Nutbrook Canal, (Note: Nutbrook Canal) the Oxford Canal, (Note: Oxford Canal) the Somersetshire Coal Canal Navigation, (Note: Somersetshire Coal Canal Navigation) the Staffordshire and Worcestershire Canal, (Note: Staffordshire and Worcestershire Canal) the River Stort Navigation, (Note: River Stort Navigation) the River Stour Navigation, (Note: River Stour Navigation) the Stourbridge Navigation, (Note: Stourbridge Navigation) the Stroudwater Navigation, (Note: Stroudwater Navigation) the Warwick and Napton Canal, (Note: Warwick and Napton Canal) the River Wey Navigation, (Note: River Wey Navigation) the Wilts and Berks Canal, (Note: Wilts and Berks Canal) and the Worcester and Birmingham Canal (Note: Worcester and Birmingham Canal) (including the Droitwich Canal (Note: Droitwich Canal) and the Droitwich Junction Canal (Note: Droitwich Junction Canal)).	
Canal Tolls and Charges, No.5 (Regent's Canal) Order Confirmation Act 1894	57 & 58 Vict. c. cxcix	17 August 1894
An Act to confirm a Provisional Order made by the Board of Trade under the Railway and Canal Traffic Act, 1888, containing the Classification of Merchandise Traffic, and the Schedule of Maximum Tolls and Charges applicable thereto, for the Regent’s Canal.
	Canal Tolls and Charges, No. 5 (Regent's Canal) Order 1894 Order of the Board of Trade under the Railway and Canal Traffic Act, 1888, embodying the classification of Merchandise Traffic and the authorised Schedule of Maximum Tolls and Charges, including all wharfage charges applicable to the said classification for the Regent's Canal. (Note: Regent's Canal)	
Canal Tolls and Charges, No. 7 (River Ancholme, &c.) Order Confirmation Act 1894	57 & 58 Vict. c. cc	17 August 1894
An Act to confirm a Provisional Order made by the Board of Trade under the Railway and Canal Traffic Act, 1888, containing the Classification of Merchandise Traffic, and the Schedule of Maximum Tolls and Charges applicable thereto, for the River Ancholme Navigation, and certain other Canals.
	Canal Tolls and Charges, No. 7 (River Ancholme, &c.) Order 1894 Order of the Board of Trade under the Railway and Canal Traffic Act, 1888, embodying the Classification of Merchandise Traffic and the authorised Schedule of Maximum Tolls and Charges, including all Wharfage Charges applicable to the said Classification for the River Ancholme Navigation, (Note: River Ancholme Navigation) the Basingstoke Canal Navigation, (Note: Basingstoke Canal Navigation) the Driffield Navigation, (Note: Driffield Navigation) the Exeter Canal, (Note: Exeter Canal) the Foss Navigation, (Note: Foss Navigation) the Gravesend and Rochester Canal, (Note: Gravesend and Rochester Canal) the Ipswich and Stowmarket Navigation, (Note: Ipswich and Stowmarket Navigation) the Kensington Canal, (Note: Kensington Canal) the Leven Canal, (Note: Leven Canal) the Linton Lock Navigation, (Note: Linton Lock Navigation) the Market Weighton Navigation, (Note: Market Weighton Navigation) the North Walsham and Dilham Canal, (Note: North Walsham and Dilham Canal) the Ouse Lower Navigation (Sussex), (Note: Ouse Lower Navigation) the Ouse Navigation (York), (Note: Ouse Navigation) the Thames and Severn Canal Navigation, (Note: Thames and Severn Canal Navigation) and the Ulverston Canal. (Note: Ulverston Canal)	
Canal Tolls and Charges, No. 8 (River Cam, &c.) Order Confirmation Act 1894	57 & 58 Vict. c. cci	17 August 1894
An Act to confirm a Provisional Order made by the Board of Trade under the Railway and Canal Traffic Act, 1888, containing the Classification of Merchandise Traffic, and the Schedule of Maximum Tolls and Charges applicable thereto for the River Cam Navigation, and certain other Canals.
	Canal Tolls and Charges, No. 8 (River Cam, &c.) Order 1894 Order of the Board of Trade under the Railway and Canal Traffic Act, 1888, embodying the Classification of Merchandise Traffic and the authorised Schedule of Maximum Tolls and Charges, including all Wharfage Charges applicable to the said Classification for the River Cam Navigation, (Note: River Cam Navigation) the Eau Brink Navigation, (Note: Eau Brink Navigation) the Middle Level Navigation, (Note: Middle Level Navigations) the River Nene (Note: River Nene) (First and Second Navigation Divisions), the River Nene (Third Navigation Division), the South Level Navigation, (Note: South Level Navigation) the Thetford Navigation, (Note: Thetford Navigation) and the Wisbech Canal. (Note: Wisbech Canal)	
Canal Tolls and Charges, No. 9 (Canals of the Caledonian and North British Railway Companies) Order Confirmation Act 1894	57 & 58 Vict. c. ccii	17 August 1894
An Act to confirm a Provisional Order made by the Board of Trade under the Railway and Canal Traffic Act, 1888, containing the Classification of Merchandise Traffic, and the Schedule of Maximum Tolls and Charges applicable thereto, for the Canals of the Caledonian Railway Company and of the North British Railway Company.
	Canal Tolls and Charges, No. 9 (Canals of the Caledonian and North British Railway Companies) Order 1894 Order of the Board of Trade under the Railway and Canal Traffic Act, 1888, embodying the Classification of Merchandise Traffic and the authorised Schedule of Maximum Tolls and Charges, including all Wharfage Charges applicable to the said Classification for the Canals of the Caledonian Railway Company, and of the North British Railway Compапу.	
Canals Rates, Tolls and Charges, No. 11 (Grand Canal) Order Confirmation Act 1894	57 & 58 Vict. c. cciii	17 August 1894
An Act to confirm a Provisional Order made by the Board of Trade under the Railway and Canal Traffic Act, 1888, containing the Classification of Merchandise Traffic, and the Schedule of Maximum Rates, Tolls, and Charges applicable thereto, for the Grand Canal.
	Canal Rates, Tolls and Charges, No. 11 (Grand Canal) Order 1894 Order of the Board of Trade under the Railway and Canal Traffic Act, 1888, embodying the Classification of Merchandise Traffic and the authorised Schedule of Maximum Rates, Tolls, and Charges, including all Terminal and Wharfage Charges applicable to the said Classification for the Grand Canal. (Note: Grand Canal)	
Canal Tolls and Charges, No. 4 (Birmingham Canal) Order Confirmation Act 1894	57 & 58 Vict. c. cciv	25 August 1894
An Act to confirm a Provisional Order made by the Board of Trade under the Railway and Canal Traffic Act, 1888, containing the Classification of Merchandise Traffic, and the Schedule of Maximum Tolls and Charges applicable thereto, for the Birmingham Canal Navigations.
	Canal Rates, Tolls and Charges, No. 4 (Birmingham Canal) Order 1894 Order of the Board of Trade under the Railway and Canal Traffic Act, 1888, embodying the Classification of Merchandise Traffic and the authorised Schedule of Maximum Tolls and Charges, including all Wharfage Charges applicable to the said Classification for the Birmingham Canal Navigations. (Note: Birmingham Canal Navigations)	
Canal Tolls and Charges, No. 6 (River Lee, &c.) Order Confirmation Act 1894	57 & 58 Vict. c. ccv	25 August 1894
An Act to confirm a Provisional Order made by the Board of Trade under the Railway and Canal Traffic Act, 1888, containing the Classification of Merchandise Traffic, and the Schedule of Maximum Tolls and Charges applicable thereto, for the River Lee Navigation, and certain other Canals.
	Canal Tolls and Charges, No. 6 (River Lee, &c.) Order 1894 Order of the Board of Trade under the Railway and Canal Traffic Act, 1888, embodying the Classification of Merchandise Traffic and the authorised Schedule of Maximum Tolls and Charges, including all wharfage charges applicable to the said Classification for the River Lee Navigation, (Note: River Lee Navigation) the Severn Navigation, (Note: Severn Navigation) the Surrey Canal, (Note: Surrey Canal) the River Thames Navigation, (Note: River Thames Navigation) and the River Weaver Navigation. (Note: River Weaver Navigation)	
Canal Tolls and Charges, No. 10 (Lagan, &c. Canals) Order Confirmation Act 1894	57 & 58 Vict. c. ccvi	25 August 1894
An Act to confirm a Provisional Order made by the Board of Trade under the Railway and Canal Traffic Act, 1888, containing the Classification of Merchandise Traffic, and the Schedule of Maximum Tolls and Charges applicable thereto, for the Lagan Canal, and certain other Canals.
	Canal Tolls and Charges, No. 10 (Lagan, &c. Canals) Order 1894 Order of the Board of Trade under the Railway and Canal Traffic Act, 1888, embodying the Classification of Merchandise Traffic and the authorised Schedule of Maximum Tolls and Charges, including all Wharfage Charges applicable to the said Classification for the Lagan Canal, (Note: Lagan Canal) the Tyrone Navigation, (Note: Tyrone Navigation) the Ulster Canal, (Note: Ulster Canal) the Lower Bann Navigation, (Note: Lower Bann Navigation) the Newry Navigation, (Note: Newry Navigation) the Royal Canal, (Note: Royal Canal) and the River Shannon Navigation. (Note: River Shannon Navigation)	
Furness Railway Act 1894	57 & 58 Vict. c. ccvii	25 August 1894
An Act for confirming the making by the Furness Railway Company of an outfall sewer and for conferring further powers on the Company for the acquisition of Lands the raising of Capital and otherwise in relation to their Undertaking and for reducing the light duties levied by the Commissioners and Trustees of the Port of Lancaster and making further provision for the division between those Commissioners and Trustees and the Company of a portion of the light duties and for other purposes,
Harrow and Stanmore Gas Act 1894	57 & 58 Vict. c. ccviii	25 August 1894
An Act for confirming an agreement for the acquisition by the Harrow District Gas Company of the undertaking of the Great Stanmore Gas Company Limited to extend the limits of supply of the first-mentioned Company to authorise them to raise additional capital to confer further powers upon them and to alter their name and for other purposes.
Manchester Corporation Act 1894	57 & 58 Vict. c. ccix	25 August 1894
An Act to confer further Powers upon the Mayor Aldermen and Citizens of the City of Manchester in the County of Lancaster with respect to Street Improvements and other Works and the Acquisition of Lands and for other purposes.
Plymouth and Stonehouse Gas Act 1894	57 & 58 Vict. c. ccx	25 August 1894
An Act to confer further Powers on the Plymouth and Stonehouse Gas Light and Coke Company and for other purposes.
Birmingham, North Warwickshire, and Stratford-upon-Avon Railway Act 1894	57 & 58 Vict. c. ccxi	25 August 1894
An Act for making a Railway from Birmingham to Stratford-upon-Avon and for other purposes.
London County Council (General Powers) Act 1894	57 & 58 Vict. c. ccxii	25 August 1894
An Act to make further provisions with respect to the use of Fire Hydrants Byelaws as to conveyance of Explosives over the Ferries of the London County Council enforcement of Ferry Byelaws the protection of Sewers and contribution towards Paddington Recreation Ground.
London Building Act 1894 (repealed)	57 & 58 Vict. c. ccxiii	25 August 1894
An Act to consolidate and amend the Enactments relating to Streets and Buildings in London. (Repealed by London Building Act 1930 (20 & 21 Geo. 5. c. clviii))
Drumcondra and North Dublin Link Railway Act 1894	57 & 58 Vict. c. ccxiv	25 August 1894
An Act for making Railways in the County and County of the City of Dublin and for other purposes.
Ealing and South Harrow Railway Act 1894	57 & 58 Vict. c. ccxv	25 August 1894
An Act for making a Railway between Ealing and South Harrow in the county of Middlesex and for other purposes.
London, Walthamstow, and Epping Forest Railway Act 1894 (repealed)	57 & 58 Vict. c. ccxvi	25 August 1894
An Act for making a Railway from London to Walthamstow and Epping Forest and for other purposes. (Repealed by London, Walthamstow and Epping Forest Railway (Abandonment) Act 1900 (63 & 64 Vict. c. cclii))

=== Private and personal acts ===
Short title	Citation	Royal assent
Long title
Bathwick and Wrington Estates Act 1894	57 & 58 Vict. c. 1 Pr.	31 July 1894
An Act to enable Money to be raised by Mortgage for Improvement of the Bathwick Estate and the Wrington Estate in the County of Somerset devised by the Will of the Most Noble Harry George Powlett late Duke of Cleveland deceased.
Walker's Estate Act 1894	57 & 58 Vict. c. 2 Pr.	17 August 1894
An Act to confer further powers on the Executors and Trustees of the Will of the late Thomas Andrew Walker in relation to his real and personal estate.
Whitaker's Divorce Act 1894 (Note: This act was not printed by the Queen's Printer.)	57 & 58 Vict. c. 3 Pr.	3 July 1894
An Act to dissolve the Marriage of John Minchin Whitaker, of Cove House, Sandycove, Kingstown, in the County of Dublin, Surgeon, with Catherine Anne Whitaker, his now Wife, and to enable him to Marry again, and for other purposes.
Graves' Divorce Act 1894	57 & 58 Vict. c. 4 Pr.	3 July 1894
An Act to dissolve the Marriage of Arnold Felix Graves, of 41, Raglan Road, Dublin, Barrister-at-Law, with Constance Louise Graves, his present wife, and to enable him to Marry again, and for other purposes.
Von Roemer's Resumption of British Nationality Act 1894	57 & 58 Vict. c. 5 Pr.	25 August 1894
An Act to restore Justina Clementina Boeheim or Von Roemer to British Nationality, and to confer upon her all the rights, privileges, and capacities of a natural-born subject of Her Majesty the Queen.

=== Sources ===
- The Public General Statutes, Volume 31: 57 & 58 Victoria – 1894. 5 March 1894 – via Internet Archive.
- Local and Personal Acts – via Google Books.

== See also ==
- List of acts of the Parliament of the United Kingdom
