= Guildford power station =

Former power station in Surrey, England

- Country: England
- Location: Guildford
- Coordinates: 51°14′46″N 00°34′42″W
- Status: Decommissioned and demolished
- Construction began: 1894, 1928 (Woodbridge Road)
- Commission date: November 1896, 1928 (Woodbridge Road)
- Decommission date: 1967
- Owners: Guildford Electricity Supply Company Limited (1894–1921), Guildford Corporation (1921–1948), British Electricity Authority (1948–55), Central Electricity Authority (1955–57), Central Electricity Generating Board (1958–66)
- Operators: Guildford Electricity Supply Company Limited (1894–1921), Guildford Corporation (1921–1948), British Electricity Authority (1948–55), Central Electricity Authority (1955–57), Central Electricity Generating Board (1958–66)

Thermal power station
- Primary fuel: Coal
- Turbine technology: Reciprocating engines and steam turbines
- Cooling source: River water

Power generation
- Units operational: 2 × 1,875 kW and 2 × 3,750 kW
- Units decommissioned: All
- Nameplate capacity: 6 MW (1928) 11.25 MW (1954)
- Annual net output: 13,277 MWh (1946)

Guildford power station supplied electricity to the town of Guildford and the surrounding area from 1896 to 1967. The power station was built and operated by the Guildford Electricity Supply Company Limited. In 1921 it was acquired by the Guildford Corporation which operated it until the nationalisation of the British electricity supply industry in 1948.

== History ==
The Holloway Electricity Supply Company Limited was registered on 30 June 1892, it changed its name to the Guildford Electricity Supply Company Limited on 17 September 1894. The company applied for a provisional order under the Electric Lighting Acts to generate and supply electricity to the town of Guildford. The Guildford Electric Lighting Order 1894 was granted by the Board of Trade and was confirmed by Parliament through the Electric Lighting Orders Confirmation (No. 4) Act 1894 (57 & 58 Vict. c. cxv).

The power station was built adjacent to the River Wey and was commissioned in November 1896. The electricity plant comprised Willans engines coupled directly to Goolden dynamos. The company charged 7d. and 4d./kWh with discounts and sold 15,291 kWh in 1898.

In 1913 the Guildford Electricity Supply Company built a new power house near New Bridge.

In 1921 the Guildford Electricity Supply Company was acquired by the Guildford Corporation. In 1928 the corporation built a new power station in Woodbridge Road (51°14′45.5″N 0°34′41.6″W) adjacent to the River Wey and the railway. The site was designed for 42MW capacity but opening in November 1927 it contained 2 x1,500 kW and a 3,000 kW turbo alternators supplied by C A Parson at a construction cost £140,000.

The Central Electricity Board built the first stages of the National Grid between 1927 and 1933. Guildford power station were connected to the electricity grid.

The British electricity supply industry was nationalised in 1948 under the provisions of the Electricity Act 1947 (10 & 11 Geo. 6. c. 54). The Guildford electricity undertaking was abolished, ownership of Guildford power station were vested in the British Electricity Authority, and subsequently the Central Electricity Authority and the Central Electricity Generating Board (CEGB). At the same time the electricity distribution and sales responsibilities of the Guildford electricity undertaking were transferred to the South Eastern Electricity Board (SEEBOARD).

Following nationalisation Guildford power station became part of the Guildford electricity supply district.

Guilford power station was closed in 1967.

== Equipment specification ==
=== Plant in 1923 ===
By 1923 the plant at Guildford comprised boilers delivering a total of 25,000 lb/h (3.15 kg/s) of steam to:

- 1 × 60 kW reciprocating engine generating direct current (DC)
- 1 × 100 kW reciprocating engine generating DC
- 2 × 220 kW reciprocating engines generating DC
- 1 × 300 kW reciprocating engine generating DC

There was also a 160 kW oil-fired engine generating DC

The total generating capacity was 1,060 kW.

The following electricity supplies were available to consumers:

- 440 & 220 Volts DC
- 220 Volts 1-phase 50 Hz Alternating Current.

=== Plant in 1954 ===
By 1954 the plant (originally installed in 1927–30) comprised:

- Boilers:
  - 3 × Stirling tri-drum boilers each of 50,000 lb/h (6.3 kg/s) capacity

Total evaporative capacity 150,000 lb/h (18.9 kg/s), steam conditions were 295 psi and 750 °F (20.3 bar and 400 °C), steam was supplied to:

- Generators:
  - 2 × 1.875 MW Parsons turbo-alternators, 3-phase, 50 Hz, 6,600 volts
  - 2 × 3.75 MW Parsons turbo-alternator, 3-phase, 50 Hz, 6,600 volts

The total installed generating capacity was 11.25 MW.

Condenser water was abstracted from the river.

== Operations ==
=== Operating data 1921–23 ===
The electricity supply data for the period 1921–23 was:

Guildford power stations supply data 1921–23
Electricity Use	Units	Year		
Electricity Use	Units	1921	1922	1923
Lighting and domestic	MWh	–	323.481	463.998
Public lighting	MWh	0	0	0
Traction	MWh	0	0	0
Power	MWh	–	274.129	623.875
Bulk supply	MWh	–	–	–
Total use	MWh	–	597.610	1,087.873

Electricity Loads on the system were:

Year		1921	1922	1923
Maximum load	kW	–	740	850
Total connections	kW	–	3,190	3,600
Load factor	Per cent	–	–	17.7

Revenue from the sale of current (in 1923) was £34,930; the surplus of revenue over expenses was £22,180.

=== Operating data 1946 ===
In 1946 Guildford power station supplied 13,277 MWh of electricity; the maximum output load was 11,540 kW.

=== Operating data 1954–66 ===
Operating data for the period 1954–6 was:

Guildford power station operating data, 1954–66
Year	Running hours or (load as % of max capacity)	Max output capacity MW	Electricity supplied MWh	Thermal efficiency per cent
1954	1,228	11	6,262	13.42
1955	1,527	11	9,160	10.25
1956	690	11	4,141	10.07
1957	450	11	2,660	10.25
1958	451	11	2,642	11.27
1961	(1.9 %)	11	1,870	12.19
1962	(1.8 %)	11	1,718	10.22
1963	(6.11 %)	11	5,887	12.15
1965	(9.4 %)	11	9,090	11.02
1966	(9.6 %)	11	9,291	11.34

== Guildford Electricity District ==
Following nationalisation in 1948 Guildford power station became part of the Guildford electricity supply district, covering 95 square miles (246 km^{2}) with a population of 82,330 in 1958. The number of consumers and electricity sold in the Guildford district was:

Year	1956	1957	1958
Number of consumers	27,141	28,029	28,832
Electricity sold MWh	94,655	101,032	105,416

In 1958 the number of units sold to categories of consumers was:

Type of consumer	No. of consumers	Electricity sold MWh
Domestic	25,292	64,078
Commercial	3,147	22,159
Industrial	183	15,625
Farms	205	2,623
Traction	–	–
Public lighting	5	931
Total	28,832	105,416

== Redevelopment ==
The 1913 power station building was converted in 1997 to an arts venue called The Electric Theatre.

The power station in Woodbridge Road was demolished, the site is now occupied by a 132 kV electricity sub-station.

== See also ==
- Timeline of the UK electricity supply industry
- List of power stations in England
