= Uniforms Act 1894 =

Act of the Parliament of the United Kingdom

Uniforms Act 1894 (Note: Section 1.)
- Act of Parliament
- Parliament of the United Kingdom
- Long title: An Act to regulate and restrict the wearing of Naval and Military Uniforms.
- Citation: 57 & 58 Vict. c. 45
- Territorial extent: United Kingdom

Dates
- Royal assent: 25 August 1894
- Commencement: 1 January 1895 (Note: Section 5.)

Status: Partially repealed

Text of statute as originally enacted

Revised text of statute as amended

Text of the Uniforms Act 1894 as in force today (including any amendments) within the United Kingdom, from legislation.gov.uk.

The Uniforms Act 1894 (57 & 58 Vict. c. 45) is an act of the Parliament of the United Kingdom to regulate and restrict the wearing of naval and military uniforms in the United Kingdom.

== Provisions ==
Section 2 of the act makes it an offence for military uniforms to be worn without authority:

It shall not be lawful for any person not serving in Her Majesty’s Military Forces to wear without Her Majesty’s permission the uniform of any of those forces, or any dress having the appearance or bearing any of the regimental or other distinctive marks of any such uniform: Provided that this enactment shall not prevent . . . . . . any persons from wearing any uniform or dress in the course of a stage play performed in a place duly licensed or authorised for the public performance of stage plays, or in the course of a music hall or circus performance, or in the course of any bona fide military representation.

Section 3 of the Act provides a higher penalty where the uniform is worn "under such circumstances as to be likely to bring contempt upon that uniform." This section does not allow the exceptions in Section 2 for stage plays etc, and also covers "employ[ing] any other person so to wear that uniform or dress".

The act does not include the wearing of honours, medals and decorations.

== Definition of naval and military forces ==
The restrictions concern all:

- Royal Navy uniforms – 'naval' uniforms.
- British Army uniforms – 'military' uniforms.
- Royal Air Force uniforms – later included in the 'military' definition.

The act also says that '"Her Majesty’s Military Forces” has the same meaning as in the Armed Forces Act 2006; [but] “Her Majesty's Naval Forces” does not include any Commonwealth force"'.

== Consequences ==
Conviction under section 2 of the act is publishable by a fine not exceeding level 3 on the standard scale.

Conviction under section 3 ("...likely to bring contempt upon that uniform") is publishable by a fine not exceeding level 3 on the standard scale or to imprisonment for a term not exceeding one month:

If any person not serving in Her Majesty’s Naval or Military Forces wears without Her Majesty’s permission the uniform of any of those forces, or any dress having the appearance or bearing any of the regimental or other distinctive marks of any such uniform, in such a manner or under such circumstances as to be likely to bring contempt upon that uniform, or employs any other person so to wear that uniform or dress, he shall be liable on summary conviction to a fine not exceeding [level 3 on the standard scale], or to imprisonment for a term not exceeding one month.

=== Arrests, charges and convictions ===
In 2012, the Ministry of Defence Police arrested one person, in Devon, for wearing a Royal Navy uniform.

In 2016, the Metropolitan Police made an arrest for one person "wearing military insignia without authority".

In 2017, one man in Derbyshire was fined £500, after pleading guilty to section 2 of the act and wearing a uniform that he was not authorised to wear.

The Crown Prosecution Service reported that, between 2012–13 and 2017, seven people in England and Wales appeared before magistrates, charged with breaching the act.

In 2026, Jonathan Carley was fined £500 for posing as a Rear Admiral at a Remembrance Sunday event in Llandudno, Wales in 2025.
