= Croydon Corporation Tramways =

Tramway operator in England

Coordinates: 51.344°N 0.106°W

Operation
- Locale: Croydon
- Open: 22 January 1900
- Close: 1 July 1933
- Status: Closed

Infrastructure
- Track gauge: 1,435 mm (4 ft 8 1/2 in)
- Propulsion system: Electric

Statistics
- Route length: 11.92 miles (19.18 km)

Croydon Corporation Tramways operated a tramway service in Croydon, in South London, England, between 1900 and 1933.

== History ==
Croydon Corporation Tramways took over the Croydon Tramways Company operation on 22 January 1900 and undertook a programme of modernisation and electrification. The tramway operation was leased to British Electric Traction.

The first electric services ran on the main route between Norbury and Purley on 26 September 1901. The branches to Addiscombe, South Norwood and Thornton Heath were added to the electric system in 1902.

In 1906 the corporation took control of the tramway back from British Electric Traction. The depot was located at TQ 3201 6225, accessed from the junction of Brighton Road and Purley Downs Road.

== Closure ==
The Croydon–Addiscombe tram service was withdrawn on 28 March 1927.

The remaining services were taken over by the London Passenger Transport Board on 1 July 1933. Tramway operation in Croydon continued until final closure on 7 April 1951.
