= Children's Charter =

Children's Charter may refer to:

- The Prevention of Cruelty to, and Protection of, Children Act 1889
- The Children Act 1908
