= List of acts of the Parliament of the United Kingdom from 1889 =

This is a complete list of acts of the Parliament of the United Kingdom for the year 1889.

Note that the first parliament of the United Kingdom was held in 1801; parliaments between 1707 and 1800 were either parliaments of Great Britain or of Ireland). For acts passed up until 1707, see the list of acts of the Parliament of England and the list of acts of the Parliament of Scotland. For acts passed from 1707 to 1800, see the list of acts of the Parliament of Great Britain. See also the list of acts of the Parliament of Ireland.

For acts of the devolved parliaments and assemblies in the United Kingdom, see the list of acts of the Scottish Parliament, the list of acts of the Northern Ireland Assembly, and the list of acts and measures of Senedd Cymru; see also the list of acts of the Parliament of Northern Ireland.

The number shown after each act's title is its chapter number. Acts passed before 1963 are cited using this number, preceded by the year(s) of the reign during which the relevant parliamentary session was held; thus the Union with Ireland Act 1800 is cited as "39 & 40 Geo. 3 c. 67", meaning the 67th act passed during the session that started in the 39th year of the reign of George III and which finished in the 40th year of that reign. Note that the modern convention is to use Arabic numerals in citations (thus "41 Geo. 3" rather than "41 Geo. III"). Acts of the last session of the Parliament of Great Britain and the first session of the Parliament of the United Kingdom are both cited as "41 Geo. 3". Acts passed from 1963 onwards are simply cited by calendar year and chapter number.

All modern acts have a short title, e.g. the Local Government Act 2003. Some earlier acts also have a short title given to them by later acts, such as by the Short Titles Act 1896.

== 52 & 53 Vict. ==
The fourth session of the 24th Parliament of the United Kingdom, which met from 21 February 1889 until 30 August 1889.

=== Public general acts ===
Short title	Citation	Royal assent
Long title
Consolidated Fund (No. 1) Act 1889 (repealed)	52 & 53 Vict. c. 1	29 March 1889
An Act to apply certain sums out of the Consolidated Fund to the service of the years ending on the thirty-first day of March one thousand eight hundred and eighty-eight, one thousand eight hundred and eighty-nine, and one thousand eight hundred and ninety. (Repealed by Statute Law Revision Act 1908 (8 Edw. 7. c. 49))
Consolidated Fund (No. 2) Act 1889 (repealed)	52 & 53 Vict. c. 2	1 April 1889
An Act to apply the sum of three million seven hundred and twenty-nine thousand two hundred and three pounds out of the Consolidated Fund to the service of the year ending on the thirty-first day of March one thousand eight hundred and ninety. (Repealed by Statute Law Revision Act 1908 (8 Edw. 7. c. 49))
Army (Annual) Act 1889 (repealed)	52 & 53 Vict. c. 3	11 April 1889
An Act to provide, during twelve months, for the Discipline and Regulation of the Army. (Repealed by Statute Law Revision Act 1908 (8 Edw. 7. c. 49), Statute Law Revision Act 1950 (14 Geo. 6. c. 6) and Revision of the Army and Air Force Acts (Transitional Provisions) Act 1955 (3 & 4 Eliz. 2. c. 20))
National Debt Redemption Act 1889 (repealed)	52 & 53 Vict. c. 4	11 April 1889
An Act to provide for the Redemption of the Consolidated Three Per Cent. Stock, and the Reduced Three Per Cent. Stock. (Repealed by Bank Act 1892 (55 & 56 Vict. c. 48), Statute Law Revision Act 1908 (8 Edw. 7. c. 49), Finance Act 1942 (5 & 6 Geo. 6. c. 21) and Statute Law Revision Act 1950 (14 Geo. 6. c. 6))
Removal of Wrecks Act 1877, Amendment Act 1889 (repealed)	52 & 53 Vict. c. 5	31 May 1889
An Act to amend the Removal of Wrecks Act, 1877. (Note: Removal of Wrecks Act 1877 (40 & 41 Vict. c. 16)) (Repealed by Merchant Shipping Act 1894 (57 & 58 Vict. c. 60))
National Debt Act 1889	52 & 53 Vict. c. 6	31 May 1889
An Act to amend the Law relating to the National Debt.
Customs and Inland Revenue Act 1889 (repealed)	52 & 53 Vict. c. 7	31 May 1889
An Act to grant certain Duties of Customs and Inland Revenue, to alter other Duties, and to amend the Laws relating to Customs and Inland Revenue. (Repealed by Finance Act 1975 (c. 7))
Naval Defence Act 1889 (repealed)	52 & 53 Vict. c. 8	31 May 1889
An Act to make further provision for Naval Defence and defray the Expenses thereof. (Repealed by Finance Act 1894 (57 & 58 Vict. c. 30))
Public Libraries Acts Amendment Act 1889 (repealed)	52 & 53 Vict. c. 9	31 May 1889
An Act to amend the Public Libraries Act, 1855. (Note: Public Libraries Act 1855 (18 & 19 Vict. c. 70)) (Repealed by Public Libraries Act 1892 (55 & 56 Vict. c. 53))
Commissioners for Oaths Act 1889	52 & 53 Vict. c. 10	31 May 1889
An Act for amending and consolidating enactments relating to the administration of Oaths.
Sale of Horseflesh, &c. Regulation Act 1889	52 & 53 Vict. c. 11	24 June 1889
An Act to regulate the Sale of Horseflesh for Human Food. (Repealed for London by Public Health (London) Act 1936 (26 Geo. 5 & 1 Edw. 8. c. 50), for England and Wales by Food and Drugs Act 1938 (1 & 2 Geo. 6. c. 56) and for Scotland by Food and Drugs (Scotland) Act 1956 (4 & 5 Eliz. 2. c. 30))
Assizes Relief Act 1889 (repealed)	52 & 53 Vict. c. 12	24 June 1889
An Act to relieve the Courts of Assize from the Trial of Persons charged with Offences triable at Quarter Sessions. (Repealed by Courts Act 1971 (c. 23))
Purchase of Land (Ireland) Amendment Act 1889 (repealed)	52 & 53 Vict. c. 13	24 June 1889
An Act to amend the Purchase of Land (Ireland) Act, 1885, (Note: Purchase of Land (Ireland) Act 1885 (48 & 49 Vict. c. 73)) and the Acts amending the same. (Repealed by Statute Law Revision Act 1950 (14 Geo. 6. c. 6))
Town Police Clauses Act 1889	52 & 53 Vict. c. 14	24 June 1889
An Act to amend the provisions relating to Hackney Carriages of the Town Police Clauses Act, 1847. (Note: Town Police Clauses Act 1847 (10 & 11 Vict. c. 89))
Consolidated Fund (No. 3) Act 1889 (repealed)	52 & 53 Vict. c. 15	5 July 1889
An Act to apply the sum of twenty-six million four hundred and seventy-three thousand nine hundred and forty-four pounds out of the Consolidated Fund to the service of the year ending on the thirty-first day of March one thousand eight hundred and ninety. (Repealed by Statute Law Revision Act 1908 (8 Edw. 7. c. 49))
Secretary for Scotland Act 1889	52 & 53 Vict. c. 16	5 July 1889
An Act to explain the Secretary for Scotland Act, 1887. (Note: Secretary for Scotland Act 1887 (50 & 51 Vict. c. 52))
London Coal Duties Abolition Act 1889 (repealed)	52 & 53 Vict. c. 17	9 July 1889
An Act to abolish any Duties on Coals leviable by the Corporation of London. (Repealed by Statute Law (Repeals) Act 1976 (c. 16))
Indecent Advertisements Act 1889	52 & 53 Vict. c. 18	26 July 1889
An Act to suppress Indecent Advertisements. (Repealed for England and Wales and Scotland by Indecent Displays (Control) Act 1981 (c. 42))
Registration of County Electors (Extension of Time) Act 1889 (repealed)	52 & 53 Vict. c. 19	26 July 1889
An Act to extend the Time for the Preparation of the Registers of County Electors in England and Wales. (Repealed by Statute Law Revision Act 1908 (8 Edw. 7. c. 49))
Agricultural Holdings (Scotland) Act 1889 (repealed)	52 & 53 Vict. c. 20	26 July 1889
An Act to amend the Agricultural Holdings (Scotland) Act, 1883. (Note: Agricultural Holdings (Scotland) Act 1883 (46 & 47 Vict. c. 62)) (Repealed by Agricultural Holdings Act 1900 (63 & 64 Vict. c. 50))
Weights and Measures Act 1889 (repealed)	52 & 53 Vict. c. 21	26 July 1889
An Act for amending the Law relating to Weights and Measures and for other purposes connected therewith. (Repealed for England and Wales and Scotland by Weights and Measures Act 1963 (c. 31) and for Northern Ireland by Weights and Measures Act (Northern Ireland) 1967 (c. 6 (N.I.)) and Gas (Northern Ireland) Order 1977 (SI 1977/596 (N.I. 7)))
Friendly Societies Act 1889 (repealed)	52 & 53 Vict. c. 22	26 July 1889
An Act to amend the Friendly Societies Acts. (Repealed by Collecting Societies and Industrial Assurance Companies Act 1896 (59 & 60 Vict. c. 26))
Herring Fishery (Scotland) Act 1889 (repealed)	52 & 53 Vict. c. 23	26 July 1889
An Act to amend the Herring Fishery (Scotland) Acts; and for other purposes relating thereto. (Repealed by Inshore Fishing (Scotland) Act 1984 (c. 26))
Master and Servant Act 1889 (repealed)	52 & 53 Vict. c. 24	26 July 1889
An Act to repeal certain Statutes, relating to Master and Servants in particular Manufactures, which have ceased to be put in force or have become unnecessary by the enactment of subsequent Statutes. (Repealed by Statute Law (Repeals) Act 1977 (c. 18))
National Portrait Gallery Act 1889 (repealed)	52 & 53 Vict. c. 25	26 July 1889
An Act to provide a Site for a National Portrait Gallery, and for other purposes connected therewith. (Repealed by Statute Law (Repeals) Act 1978 (c. 45))
Small Debt Amendment (Scotland) Act 1889 (repealed)	52 & 53 Vict. c. 26	12 August 1889
An Act to extend and amend the Law relating to the recovery of Small Debts in Scotland. (Repealed by Sheriff Courts (Scotland) Act 1971 (c. 58))
Advertising Stations (Rating) Act 1889 (repealed)	52 & 53 Vict. c. 27	12 August 1889
An Act to amend the Law with respect to rating Places used for Advertisements. (Repealed for England and Wales by General Rate Act 1967 (c. 9) and for Scotland and Northern Ireland by Statute Law (Repeals) Act 1975 (c. 10))
Canada (Ontario Boundary) Act 1889	52 & 53 Vict. c. 28	12 August 1889
An Act to declare the Boundaries of the Province of Ontario in the Dominion of Canada.
Passengers Acts Amendment Act 1889 (repealed)	52 & 53 Vict. c. 29	12 August 1889
An Act to amend the Passengers Act, 1855, (Note: Passengers Act 1855 (18 & 19 Vict. c. 119)) and the Passengers Act Amendment Act, 1863. (Note: Passengers Act Amendment Act 1863 (26 & 27 Vict. c. 51)) (Repealed by Merchant Shipping Act 1894 (57 & 58 Vict. c. 60))
Board of Agriculture Act 1889	52 & 53 Vict. c. 30	12 August 1889
An Act for establishing a Board of Agriculture for Great Britain. (Note: Consolidated acts for tithes, drainage, land improvement, allotments, commons, inclosures, contagious diseases, et al., from 1841 on.)
Army and Navy Audit Act 1889 (repealed)	52 & 53 Vict. c. 31	12 August 1889
An Act to make provision for the Audit of the Manufacturing and Shipbuilding and other like Accounts of the Army and Navy. (Repealed by Exchequer and Audit Departments Act 1921 (11 & 12 Geo. 5. c. 52))
Trust Investment Act 1889 (repealed)	52 & 53 Vict. c. 32	12 August 1889
An Act to amend the Law relating to the Investment of Trust Funds. (Repealed for England and Wales by Local Government Act 1933 (23 & 24 Geo. 5. c. 51) and for Northern Ireland by Local Government (Miscellaneous Provisions) (Northern Ireland) Order 1985 (SI 1985/1208 (N.I. 15)))
Windward Islands Appeal Court Act 1889 (repealed)	52 & 53 Vict. c. 33	12 August 1889
An Act to provide for modifying the Constitution of the Court of Appeal for the Windward Islands. (Repealed by West Indian Court of Appeal Act 1919 (9 & 10 Geo. 5. c. 47))
Telegraph (Isle of Man) Act 1889 (repealed)	52 & 53 Vict. c. 34	12 August 1889
An Act to amend the Telegraph Acts, 1863 to 1885, and the Post Office Acts in relation to the Isle of Man. (Repealed by Telecommunications Act 1984 (c. 12))
Prince of Wales's Children Act 1889 (repealed)	52 & 53 Vict. c. 35	12 August 1889
An Act to make provision for the Support and Maintenance of the Children of His Royal Highness Albert Edward, Prince of Wales. (Repealed by Civil List Act 1901 (1 Edw. 7. c. 4))
Settled Land Act 1889	52 & 53 Vict. c. 36	12 August 1889
An Act to amend the Settled Land Act, 1882. (Note: Settled Land Act 1882 (45 & 46 Vict. c. 38)) (Repealed for England and Wales by Law of Property (Amendment) Act 1924 (15 & 16 Geo. 5. c. 5) (Note: Incorrectly cited as "Law of Property (Amendment) Act 1925" in the Chronological Table of the Statutes.))
Companies Clauses Consolidation Act 1889 (repealed)	52 & 53 Vict. c. 37	12 August 1889
An Act to amend the Companies Clauses Consolidation Act, 1888. (Note: Companies Clauses Consolidation Act 1888 (51 & 52 Vict. c. 48)) (Repealed by Statute Law Revision Act 1908 (8 Edw. 7. c. 49))
Basutoland and British Bechuanaland Marriage Act 1889 (repealed)	52 & 53 Vict. c. 38	12 August 1889
An Act to remove Doubts as to the Validity of certain Marriages solemnised in Basutoland and in British Bechuanaland. (Repealed by Foreign Marriage (Amendment) Act 1988 (c. 44))
Judicial Factors (Scotland) Act 1889	52 & 53 Vict. c. 39	12 August 1889
An Act to amend and extend the law relating to judicial factors and others in Scotland, and to unite the offices of the Accountant of the Court of Session and the Accountant in Bankruptcy in Scotland.
Welsh Intermediate Education Act 1889 (repealed)	52 & 53 Vict. c. 40	12 August 1889
An Act to promote Intermediate Education in Wales. (Repealed by Education (Miscellaneous Provisions) Act 1948 (11 & 12 Geo. 6. c. 40))
Lunacy Acts Amendment Act 1889 (repealed)	52 & 53 Vict. c. 41	26 August 1889
An Act to amend the Acts relating to Lunatics. (Repealed by Lunacy Act 1890 (53 & 54 Vict. c. 5))
Revenue Act 1889	52 & 53 Vict. c. 42	26 August 1889
An Act to amend the Law relating to the Customs and Inland Revenue, and for other purposes connected with the Public Revenue and Expenditure.
Merchant Shipping (Tonnage) Act 1889 (repealed)	52 & 53 Vict. c. 43	26 August 1889
An Act to amend the Law relating to the Measurement of the Tonnage of Merchant Ships. (Repealed by Merchant Shipping Act 1894 (57 & 58 Vict. c. 60))
Prevention of Cruelty to, and Protection of, Children Act 1889 or the Children's Charter (repealed)	52 & 53 Vict. c. 44	26 August 1889
An Act for the Prevention of Cruelty to, and better Protection of, Children. (Repealed by Prevention of Cruelty to Children Act 1894 (57 & 58 Vict. c. 41))
Factors Act 1889	52 & 53 Vict. c. 45	26 August 1889
An Act to amend and consolidate the Factors Acts.
Merchant Shipping Act 1889 (repealed)	52 & 53 Vict. c. 46	26 August 1889
An Act to amend the Merchant Shipping Act, 1854, (Note: Merchant Shipping Act 1854 (17 & 18 Vict. c. 104)) and the Acts amending the same. (Repealed by Merchant Shipping Act 1894 (57 & 58 Vict. c. 60))
Palatine Court of Durham Act 1889 (repealed)	52 & 53 Vict. c. 47	26 August 1889
An Act to amend the Practice and Proceedings of the Court of Chancery of the county palatine of Durham. (Repealed by Courts Act 1971 (c. 23))
County Court Appeals (Ireland) Act 1889 (repealed)	52 & 53 Vict. c. 48	26 August 1889
An Act to amend the County Court (Ireland) Acts. (Repealed by Judicature (Northern Ireland) Act 1978 (c. 23))
Arbitration Act 1889 (repealed)	52 & 53 Vict. c. 49	26 August 1889
An Act for amending and consolidating the Enactments relating to Arbitration. (Repealed by Arbitration Act 1950 (14 Geo. 6. c. 27) (Note: Incorrectly cited as "Arbitration Act 1960" in the Chronological Table of the Statutes.))
Local Government (Scotland) Act 1889 (repealed)	52 & 53 Vict. c. 50	26 August 1889
An Act to amend the Laws relating to Local Government in Scotland. (Repealed by Statute Law (Repeals) Act 1976 (c. 16))
General Police and Improvement (Scotland) Act 1862 Amendment Act 1889 (repealed)	52 & 53 Vict. c. 51	26 August 1889
An Act to amend the General Police and Improvement (Scotland) Act, 1862. (Note: General Police and Improvement (Scotland) Act 1862 (25 & 26 Vict. c. 101)) (Repealed by Burgh Police (Scotland) Act 1892 (55 & 56 Vict. c. 55))
Official Secrets Act 1889 (repealed)	52 & 53 Vict. c. 52	26 August 1889
An Act to prevent the Disclosure of Official Documents and Information. (Repealed by Official Secrets Act 1911 (1 & 2 Geo. 5. c. 28))
Paymaster General Act 1889 (repealed)	52 & 53 Vict. c. 53	30 August 1889
An Act to amend the Acts relating to the Office of Paymaster General, and to mate better Provision for the Discharge of the Duties of that Office. (Repealed by Statute Law (Repeals) Act 1993 (c. 50))
Clerks of Session (Scotland) Regulation Act 1889	52 & 53 Vict. c. 54	30 August 1889
An Act to regulate the Number and Duties of the Clerks of the Court of Session and Bill Chamber in Scotland, and for other purposes.
Universities (Scotland) Act 1889	52 & 53 Vict. c. 55	30 August 1889
An Act for the better Administration and Endowment of the Universities of Scotland.
Poor Law Act 1889 (repealed)	52 & 53 Vict. c. 56	30 August 1889
An Act to amend the Law respecting Children in Workhouses, and respecting the borrowing of Money by Guardians and Managers of District Schools, and respecting the Managers of the Metropolitan Asylum District. (Repealed for England and Wales by Poor Law Act 1927 (17 & 18 Geo. 5. c. 14) and Local Government Act 1929 (19 & 20 Geo. 5. c. 17) and for Northern Ireland by Children and Young Persons Act (Northern Ireland) 1950 (c. 5 (N.I.)))
Regulation of Railways Act 1889	52 & 53 Vict. c. 57	30 August 1889
An Act to amend the Regulation of Railways Acts; and for other purposes.
Coinage Act 1889 (repealed)	52 & 53 Vict. c. 58	30 August 1889
An Act to amend the Coinage Act, 1870, (Note: Coinage Act 1870 (33 & 34 Vict. c. 10)) as respects Light Gold Coins. (Repealed by Statute Law Revision Act 1908 (8 Edw. 7. c. 49))
Land Law (Ireland) Act 1888, Amendment Act 1889 (repealed)	52 & 53 Vict. c. 59	30 August 1889
An Act to amend "The Land Law (Ireland) Act, 1888," (Note: Land Law (Ireland) Act 1888 (51 & 52 Vict. c. 13)) with regard to Leaseholders. (Repealed by Statute Law Revision Act 1950 (14 Geo. 6. c. 6))
Preferential Payments in Bankruptcy (Ireland) Act 1889 (repealed)	52 & 53 Vict. c. 60	30 August 1889
An Act to amend the Law with respect to Preferential Payments in Bankruptcy in the Administration of Insolvent Estates, and in the winding up of Companies in Ireland. (Repealed by Statute Law Revision Act 1908 (8 Edw. 7. c. 49) and Preferential Payments in Bankruptcy Act (Northern Ireland) 1933 (23 & 24 Geo. 5. c. 7 (N.I.)))
London Council (Money) Act 1889 (repealed)	52 & 53 Vict. c. 61	30 August 1889
An Act to further amend the Acts relating to the raising of Money by the London County Council, and for other purposes. (Repealed by London County Council (Finance Consolidation) Act 1912 (2 & 3 Geo. 5. c. cv))
Cotton Cloth Factories Act 1889 (repealed)	52 & 53 Vict. c. 62	30 August 1889
An Act to make further provision for the regulation of Cotton Cloth Factories. (Repealed by Factory and Workshop Act 1901 (1 Edw. 7. c. 22))
Interpretation Act 1889 (repealed)	52 & 53 Vict. c. 63	30 August 1889
An Act for consolidating enactments relating to the Construction of Acts of Parliament and for further shortening the Language used in Acts of Parliament. (Repealed for England and Wales and Scotland by Interpretation Act 1978 (c. 30) and for Northern Ireland by Judicature (Northern Ireland) Act 1978 (c. 23))
Public Health Act 1889 (repealed)	52 & 53 Vict. c. 64	30 August 1889
An Act to remove doubts as to the Power of the Local Government Board to make Regulations respecting Cholera. (Repealed by Public Health Act 1896 (59 & 60 Vict. c. 19))
Council of India Reduction Act 1889 (repealed)	52 & 53 Vict. c. 65	30 August 1889
An Act to amend the Law as to the Council of India. (Repealed by Council of India Act 1907 (7 Edw. 7. c. 35))
Light Railways (Ireland) Act 1889 or Balfour's Act (repealed)	52 & 53 Vict. c. 66	30 August 1889
An Act to facilitate the Construction of Light Railways in Ireland. (Repealed by Public Works, etc., Loans Act (Northern Ireland) 1953 (c. 13 (N.I.)))
Expiring Laws Continuance Act 1889 (repealed)	52 & 53 Vict. c. 67	30 August 1889
An Act to continue various Expiring Laws. (Repealed by Statute Law Revision Act 1908 (8 Edw. 7. c. 49))
Merchant Shipping (Pilotage) Act 1889 (repealed)	52 & 53 Vict. c. 68	30 August 1889
An Act to amend the Law relating to Pilotage. (Repealed by Merchant Shipping Act 1894 (57 & 58 Vict. c. 60))
Public Bodies Corrupt Practices Act 1889 (repealed)	52 & 53 Vict. c. 69	30 August 1889
An Act for the more effectual Prevention and Punishment of Bribery and Corruption of and by Members, Officers, or Servants of Corporations, Councils, Boards, Commissions, or other Public Bodies. (Repealed by Bribery Act 2010 (c. 23))
Appropriation Act 1889 (repealed)	52 & 53 Vict. c. 70	30 August 1889
An Act to apply a sum out of the Consolidated Fund to the service of the year ending on the thirty-first day of March one thousand eight hundred and ninety, and to appropriate the Supplies granted in this Session of Parliament . (Repealed by Statute Law Revision Act 1908 (8 Edw. 7. c. 49))
Public Works Loans Act 1889	52 & 53 Vict. c. 71	30 August 1889
An Act to grant Money for the purpose of certain Local Loans, and for other purposes relating to Local Loans. (Repealed for England and Wales and Scotland by Statute Law Revision Act 1908 (8 Edw. 7. c. 49) and Statute Law Revision Act 1950 (14 Geo. 6. c. 6))
Infectious Disease (Notification) Act 1889 (repealed)	52 & 53 Vict. c. 72	30 August 1889
An Act to provide for the Notification of Infectious Disease to Local Authorities. (Repealed for England and Wales by Public Health Act 1936 (26 Geo. 5 & 1 Edw. 8. c. 49), for Northern Ireland by Public Health Act (Northern Ireland) 1967 (c. 36 (N.I.)) and for Scotland by Public Health etc. (Scotland) Act 2008 (asp 5))
Merchant Shipping (Colours) Act 1889 (repealed)	52 & 53 Vict. c. 73	30 August 1889
An Act to amend the Law relating to the use of Flags in the British Merchant Service. (Repealed by Merchant Shipping Act 1894 (57 & 58 Vict. c. 60))
Steam Trawling (Ireland) Act 1889 (repealed)	52 & 53 Vict. c. 74	30 August 1889
An Act to enable the Inspectors of Irish Fisheries to prohibit Steam Trawling within a certain distance of the Coast of Ireland. (Repealed by Fisheries Amendment (Northern Ireland) Order 1981 (SI 1981/227 (N.I. 7)))
Parliamentary Grant (Caithness and Sutherland) Act 1889 (repealed)	52 & 53 Vict. c. 75	30 August 1889
An Act to amend the Law in regard to Annual Parliamentary Grants in the Counties of Caithness and Sutherland. (Repealed by Education (Scotland) Act 1918 (8 & 9 Geo. 5. c. 48))
Technical Instruction Act 1889 (repealed)	52 & 53 Vict. c. 76	30 August 1889
An Act to facilitate the Provision of Technical Instruction. (Repealed for England and Wales by Education Act 1902 (2 Edw. 7. c. 42) and Education (London) Act 1903 (3 Edw. 7. c. 24) and for Northern Ireland by Education Act (Northern Ireland) 1923 (13 & 14 Geo. 5. c. 21 (N.I.)))

=== Local acts ===
Short title	Citation	Royal assent
Long title
Drainage and Improvement of Lands Supplemental (Ireland) Act 1889	52 & 53 Vict. c. i	11 April 1889
Αn Act to confirm a Provisional Order under the Drainage and Improvement of Lands (Ireland) Act, 1863, (Note: Drainage and Improvement of Lands Act (Ireland) 1863 (26 & 27 Vict. c. 88)) and the Acts amending the same relating to the Tramore River Drainage District, county Cork.
	Tramore River Drainage (Cork) Order 1889 In the Matter of the Tramore River Drainage District, in the county of Cork.	
Hythe Corporation Act 1889 (repealed)	52 & 53 Vict. c. ii	31 May 1889
An Act to confer further powers on the Mayor Aldermen and Burgesses of the Borough of Hythe with respect to their Water Undertaking. (Repealed by Kent Water Act 1955 (4 & 5 Eliz. 2. c. xi))
Sheffield Corporation Act 1889 (repealed)	52 & 53 Vict. c. iii	31 May 1889
An Act to amend the Sheffield Corporation Act 1883 (Note: Sheffield Corporation Act 1883 (46 & 47 Vict. c. lvii)) and for other purposes. (Repealed by Sheffield Corporation (Consolidation) Act 1918 (8 & 9 Geo. 5. c. lxi))
Cathcart District Railway Act 1889	52 & 53 Vict. c. iv	31 May 1889
An Act to empower the Caledonian Railway Company to subscribe towards and to confer on that Company certain other powers with respect to the undertaking of the Cathcart District Railway Company and for other purposes.
Ballina and Killala Railway and Harbour (Abandonment) Act 1889	52 & 53 Vict. c. v	31 May 1889
An Act for the Abandonment of the Ballina and Killala Railway and Harbour and for other purposes.
Local Government Board (Ireland) Provisional Orders Confirmation (Kilrush and Cappoquin) Act 1889	52 & 53 Vict. c. vi	31 May 1889
An Act to confirm certain Provisional Orders of the Local Government Board for Ireland relating to Kilrush and Cappoquin.
	Kilrush Town Provisional Order 1888 (Note: Although passed in 1889, the short title is specified as the Kilrush Town Provisional Order 1888.) Kilrush Town. Provisional Order.	
	Cappoquin Waterworks Provisional Order 1888 (Note: Although passed in 1889, the short title is specified as the Cappoquin Waterworks Provisional Order 1888.) Cappoquin Waterworks. Provisional Order.	
London Hydraulic Power Act 1889	52 & 53 Vict. c. vii	31 May 1889
An Act to empower the London Hydraulic Power Company to raise additional capital and for other purposes.
Workington Dock and Harbour (Extension of Time) Act 1889 (repealed)	52 & 53 Vict. c. viii	31 May 1889
An Act to revive the powers and to extend the period for the compulsory Purchase of Lands and to extend the period for the completion of the New Dock and Works authorised by the Workington Dock and Harbour Act 1882. (Note: Workington Dock and Harbour Act 1882 (45 & 46 Vict. c. ccviii)) (Repealed by Workington Harbour and Dock (Transfer) Act 1957 (5 & 6 Eliz. 2. c. xxxii))
Wood Green Local Board Act 1889	52 & 53 Vict. c. ix	31 May 1889
An Act for transferring to the Wood Green Local Board portions of certain funds derived from the sale of Waste Lands in the Parish of Tottenham in the County of Middlesex and for other purposes.
Bristol Waterworks Act 1889	52 & 53 Vict. c. x	31 May 1889
An Act for the granting of further powers to the Bristol Waterworks Company; and for other purposes.
Edinburgh and District Waterworks Act 1889	52 & 53 Vict. c. xi	31 May 1889
An Act to enable the Edinburgh and District Water Trustees to borrow additional sums of money; and for other purposes.
Caledonian Railway Act 1889	52 & 53 Vict. c. xii	31 May 1889
An Act for enabling the Caledonian Railway Company to make and maintain certain Railways and other works, and take lands in the Counties of Stirling, Midlothian, Lanark and Ayr; to acquire the Undertakings of the Glasgow Central and Moffat Railway Companies, and to raise additional money; for extending the time for completing certain Railways and other works in the Counties of Lanark, Renfrew, and Forfar; for confirming certain agreements and authorising other agreements; for releasing the sums deposited with reference to the Port Carlisle Branch of the Solway Junction Railway Company, and to the Undertakings of the Annan Waterfoot Dock and Railway Company, and the Glasgow Central Railway Company; for dissolving the two Companies last named and the Moffat Railway Company; and for other purposes.
Faversham Gas Act 1889	52 & 53 Vict. c. xiii	31 May 1889
An Act for incorporating and conferring powers on the Faversham Gas Company.
Yeadon Waterworks Act 1889	52 & 53 Vict. c. xiv	31 May 1889
An Act for the granting further powers to the Yeadon Waterworks Company and for other purposes.
Local Government Board's Provisional Orders Confirmation Act 1889	52 & 53 Vict. c. xv	31 May 1889
An Act to confirm certain Provisional Orders of the Local Government Board relating to the City of Oxford and to the Counties of Oxford and Berks.
	City of Oxford Order 1889 Provisional Order made in pursuance of Sections 52 and 54 of the Local Government Act, 1888, (Note: Local Government Act 1888 (51 & 52 Vict. c. 41)) and under Section 297 of the Public Health Act, 1875. (Note: Public Health Act 1875 (38 & 39 Vict. c. 55))	
	Oxford and Berkshire Order 1889 Provisional Order made in pursuance of Section 54 of the Local Government Act, 1888.	
Education Department Provisional Orders Confirmation (Acton, &c.) Act 1889	52 & 53 Vict. c. xvi	31 May 1889
An Act to confirm certain Provisional Orders made by the Education Department under the Elementary Education Act, 1870, (Note: Elementary Education Act 1870 (33 & 34 Vict. c. 75)) to enable the School Boards for Acton, Chiswick, and Liverpool to put in force the Lands Clauses Consolidation Act, 1845, (Note: Lands Clauses Consolidation Act 1845 (8 & 9 Vict. c. 18)) and the Acts amending the same.
	Acton Order 1889 The School Board for Acton, County of Middlesex. Provisional Order for putting in force the Lands Clauses Consolidation Act, 1845.	
	Chiswick Order 1889 The School Board for Chiswick, County of Middlesex. Provisional Order for putting in force the Lands Clauses Consolidation Act, 1845.	
	Liverpool Order 1889 The School Board for Liverpool, County of Lancaster. Provisional Order for putting in force the Lands Clauses Consolidation Act, 1845.	
Sun Life Assurance Act 1889	52 & 53 Vict. c. xvii	31 May 1889
An Act to repeal and re-enact with amendments the Sun Life Assurance Society's Acts 1813 (Note: Sun Life Assurance Society Act 1813 (54 Geo. 3. c. viii)) and 1837; (Note: Sun Life Assurance Society Act 1837 (7 Will. 4 & 1 Vict. c. xlvii)) and to make further provisions in relation to the Laws and Regulations and to the Capital of the Society; and for other purposes.
Weston-super-Mare Marine Lake Act 1889	52 & 53 Vict. c. xviii	31 May 1889
An Act for incorporating a Company with power to construct a Marine Lake at Weston-super-Mare in the County of Somerset and for other purposes.
Kettering Waterworks Act 1889	52 & 53 Vict. c. xix	31 May 1889
An Act for dissolving the Kettering Waterworks Company Limited and re-incorporating the Members thereof with others and for enabling them to construct Waterworks and supply Water and for other purposes.
Metropolitan District Railway Act 1889	52 & 53 Vict. c. xx	31 May 1889
An Act to confer further powers on the Metropolitan District Railway Company and for other purposes.
Deanhead Commissioners Act 1889 (repealed)	52 & 53 Vict. c. xxi	31 May 1889
An Act to empower the Commissioners of the Deanhead Reservoir to execute Works and supply Water in bulk and for other purposes. (Repealed by Huddersfield Corporation Act 1913 (3 & 4 Geo. 5. c. xcv))
Local Government Board's Provisional Order Confirmation (No. 4) Act 1889	52 & 53 Vict. c. xxii	24 June 1889
An Act to confirm a Provisional Order of the Local Government Board relating to the Borough of Wenlock.
	Borough of Wenlock Order 1889 Provisional Order made in pursuance of Sections 52 and 54 of the Local Government Act, 1888.	
Waltham Abbey Gunpowder Factory Act 1889	52 & 53 Vict. c. xxiii	24 June 1889
An Act to exclude unauthorised Persons from certain Lands to be used for the purposes of the Royal Gunpowder Factory at Waltham Abbey, in the parish of Waltham Holy Cross, in the county of Essex, to regulate the use of a certain Footpath thereon, and for other purposes.
Local Government Board's Provisional Orders Confirmation (No. 5) Act 1889	52 & 53 Vict. c. xxiv	24 June 1889
An Act to confirm certain Provisional Orders of the Local Government Board relating to the Boroughs of Accrington and Sunderland, the Local Government Districts of Altrincham, Brentford, Haworth, Heston, and Isleworth, Swindon New Town, and Walton on the Hill, and the Rural Sanitary Districts of the Belper, Chorley, and King's Norton Unions.
	Accrington Order 1889 Provisional Order to enable the Urban Sanitary Authority for the Borough of Accrington to put in force the Compulsory Clauses of the Lands Clauses Consolidation Acts.	
	Altrincham Order 1889 Provisional Order to enable the Sanitary Authority for the Urban Sanitary District of Altrincham to put in force the Compulsory Clauses of the Lands Clauses Consolidation Acts.	
	Belper Union Order 1889 Provisional Order to enable the Sanitary Authority for the Rural Sanitary District of the Belper Union to put in force the Compulsory Clauses of the Lands Clauses Consolidation Acts.	
	Brentford Order 1889 Provisional Order to enable the Sanitary Authority for the Urban Sanitary District of Brentford to put in force the Compulsory Clauses of the Lands Clauses Consolidation Acts.	
	Chorley Union Order 1889 Provisional Order to enable the Sanitary Authority for the Rural Sanitary District of the Chorley Union to put in force the Compulsory Clauses of the Lands Clauses Consolidation Acts.	
	Haworth Order 1889 Provisional Order to enable the Sanitary Authority for the Urban Sanitary District of Haworth to put in force the Compulsory Clauses of the Lands Clauses Consolidation Acts.	
	Heston and Isleworth Order 1889 Provisional Order to enable the Sanitary Authority for the Urban Sanitary District of Heston and Isleworth to put in force the Compulsory Clauses of the Lands Clauses Consolidation Acts.	
	King's Norton Union Order 1889 Provisional Order to enable the Sanitary Authority for the Rural Sanitary District of the King's Norton Union to put in force the Compulsory Clauses of the Lands Clauses Consolidation Acts.	
	Sunderland Order 1889 Provisional Order to enable the Urban Sanitary Authority for the Borough of Sunderland to put in force the Compulsory Clauses of the Lands Clauses Consolidation Acts.	
	Swindon New Town Order 1889 Provisional Order to enable the Sanitary Authority for the Urban Sanitary District of Swindon New Town to put in force the Compulsory Clauses of the Lands Clauses Consolidation Acts.	
	Walton on the Hill Order 1889 Provisional Order to enable the Sanitary Authority for the Urban Sanitary District of Walton on the Hill to put in force the Compulsory Clauses of the Lands Clauses Consolidation Acts.	
Thurso River Harbour Act 1889	52 & 53 Vict. c. xxv	24 June 1889
An Act for making and maintaining a Harbour at Thurso, in the County of Caithness; and for other purposes.
Morley Gas Act 1889	52 & 53 Vict. c. xxvi	24 June 1889
An Act for conferring further powers upon the Morley Gas Company.
London, Chatham and Dover Railway (Further Powers) Act 1889	52 & 53 Vict. c. xxvii	24 June 1889
An Act to authorise the London Chatham and Dover Railway Company to abandon the authorised Maidstone and Faversham Railway to acquire additional lands in the County of Kent and in the City of London and for other purposes.
Great Wigston Gas Act 1889	52 & 53 Vict. c. xxviii	24 June 1889
An Act for incorporating and conferring powers on the Great Wigston Gas Light and Coke Company Limited.
Brighton, Rottingdean and Newhaven District Railway Act 1889 (repealed)	52 & 53 Vict. c. xxix	24 June 1889
An Act to extend the time for the purchase of land for and completion of the Brighton Rottingdean and Newhaven Direct Railway and for other purposes. (Repealed by Brighton, Rottingdean and Newhaven Direct Railway (Abandonment) Act 1894 (57 & 58 Vict. c. cxliv))
West Somerset Railway Act 1889	52 & 53 Vict. c. xxx	24 June 1889
An Act to authorise the Redemption of the existing Preference Shares of the West Somerset Railway Company and to enable that Company to raise additional Capital and for other purposes.
Tuscan Gas Act 1889	52 & 53 Vict. c. xxxi	24 June 1889
An Act for amending the Memorandum of Association of the Tuscan Gas Company (Limited).
Aire and Calder Navigation Act 1889	52 & 53 Vict. c. xxxii	24 June 1889
An Act for authorising the Undertakers of the Navigation of the Rivers of Aire and Calder, in the West Riding of the County of York, to construct certain Works and acquire Lands in the County of York, in connexion with their undertaking; for abandoning certain Railways and stopping up a portion of St. John Street, in Goole; for confirming certain agreements; for amending and enlarging the Acts relating to the Undertakers and for conferring further powers upon them; and for other purposes.
Great Western Railway and Llanelly Railway and Dock Companies Amalgamation Act 1889	52 & 53 Vict. c. xxxiii	24 June 1889
An Act for amalgamating the Llanelly Railway and Dock Company with the Great Western Railway Company.
Grimsby Extension and Improvement Act 1889 (repealed)	52 & 53 Vict. c. xxxiv	24 June 1889
An Act to extend the borough of Grimsby; and for other purposes. (Repealed by Humberside Act 1982 (c. iii))
Northern Assurance Act 1889 (repealed)	52 & 53 Vict. c. xxxv	24 June 1889
An Act to amend, vary, and extend the powers of the Northern Assurance Company. (Repealed by Northern Assurance Act 1908 (8 Edw. 7. c. lxvi))
Newcastle and Gateshead Waterworks Act 1889	52 & 53 Vict. c. xxxvi	24 June 1889
An Act for the granting of further powers to the Newcastle and Gateshead Water Company; and for other purposes.
Cork Corn Market Act 1889	52 & 53 Vict. c. xxxvii	24 June 1889
An Act to vest the Cork Corn Market and the control and management thereof in the Corporation of the city of Cork to provide for the use of the market buildings as municipal offices and for other purposes.
Great Western and Cornwall Railway Companies Amalgamation Act 1889	52 & 53 Vict. c. xxxviii	24 June 1889
An Act for amalgamating the Cornwall Railway Company with the Great Western Railway Company.
Midland Railway Act 1889	52 & 53 Vict. c. xxxix	24 June 1889
An Act to confer Additional Powers upon the Midland Railway Company for the construction of works and the acquisition of lands for raising further capital for vesting in that Company and the Great Northern Railway Company certain powers and a portion of the Undertaking of the Eastern and Midlands Railway Company and for other purposes.
Manchester Corporation Act 1889	52 & 53 Vict. c. xl	24 June 1889
An Act for enabling the Mayor Aldermen and Citizens of the City of Manchester in the County of Lancaster to execute works and acquire additional lands for the purposes of their Waterworks to amend and extend the provisions of the Acts relating to such Waterworks and for other purposes.
Coventry Water Act 1889	52 & 53 Vict. c. xli	24 June 1889
An Act to empower the Corporation of Coventry to make additional Waterworks and for other purposes.
Belfast Corporation Act 1889	52 & 53 Vict. c. xlii	24 June 1889
An Act to enable the Corporation of the City of Belfast to consolidate their Debts and create new Stock.
Pier and Harbour Orders Confirmation (No. 1) Act 1889	52 & 53 Vict. c. xliii	24 June 1889
An Act to confirm certain Provisional Orders made by the Board of Trade under the General Pier and Harbour Act, 1861, (Note: General Pier and Harbour Act 1861 (24 & 25 Vict. c. 45)) relating to Boscombe, Clacton-on-Sea, Keppel, Port Ness, Woodda, and Wexford.
	Boscombe Pier Order 1889 Order for amending Boscombe Pier Order 1887.	
	Clacton-on-Sea Pier Order 1889 Order for amending the Clacton-on-Sea Pier Order, 1875, and for the construction, maintenance, and regulation of additions to the pier and works at Clacton-on-Sea, in the County of Essex.	
	Keppel Pier Order 1889 Order for the Maintenance and Regulation of Keppel Pier, in the Island of Cumbrae, Parish of Cumbrae, and County of Bute.	
	Port Ness Harbour Order 1889 Order for the construction and maintenance of Works at the Harbour of Port Ness in the Island of Lewis and County of Ross and for the regulation of the Harbour.	
	Woodda Bay Pier Order 1889 Order for the Construction of a Pier and Works at Woodda Bay in the Parish of Martinhoe and County of Devon.	
	Wexford Harbour Order 1889 Order for amending the Wexford Harbour Act, 1874. (Note: Wexford Harbour Act 1874 (37 & 38 Vict. c. xl))	
Commons Regulation (Amberswood) Provisional Order Confirmation Act 1889	52 & 53 Vict. c. xliv	24 June 1889
An Act to confirm a Provisional Order for the Regulation of certain lands forming part of Amberswood Common, situate in the township of Ince-in-Makerfield, in the parish of Wigan, in the county of Lancaster, in pursuance of a report from the Land Commissioners for England.
	Amberswood Common Order 1889 Provisional Order for the Regulation of Amberswood Common, Lancaster.	
Metropolitan Police Provisional Order Confirmation Act 1889 (repealed)	52 & 53 Vict. c. xlv	24 June 1889
An Act to confirm a Provisional Order made by one of Her Majesty's Principal Secretaries of State under the Metropolitan Police Act, 1886, (Note: Metropolitan Police Act 1886 (49 & 50 Vict. c. 22)) relating to lands in the Parishes of St. Giles, Camberwell, St. Marylebone, and St. John, Wapping. (Repealed by Statute Law (Repeals) Act 2008 (c. 12))
	Provisional Order made by the Secretary of State under the Metropolitan Police Act, 1886.	
Local Government Board's Provisional Orders Confirmation (No. 6) Act 1889	52 & 53 Vict. c. xlvi	5 July 1889
An Act to confirm certain Provisional Orders of the Local Government Board relating to the Boroughs of Calne and Chippenham.
	Borough of Calne Order 1889 Provisional Order made in pursuance of Section 52 of the Local Government Act, 1888, and under Section 297 of the Public Health Act, 1875.	
	Borough of Chippenham Order 1889 Provisional Order made in pursuance of Section 52 of the Local Government Act, 1888, and under Section 297 of the Public Health Act, 1875.	
Land Drainage Supplemental Act 1889	52 & 53 Vict. c. xlvii	5 July 1889
An Act to confirm a Provisional Order under the Land Drainage Act, 1861, (Note: Land Drainage Act 1861 (24 & 25 Vict. c. 133)) relating to Goole Fields Improvements, situate in the Township of Goole, in the Parish of Snaith, in the county of York.
	Goole Order 1889 In the matter of Goole Fields Improvements situate in the Township of Goole in the parish of Snaith in the County of York.	
Pier and Harbour Orders Confirmation (No. 2) Act 1889	52 & 53 Vict. c. xlviii	5 July 1889
An Act to confirm certain Provisional Orders made by the Board of Trade under the General Pier and Harbour Act, 1861, relating to Cork, Devonport, Dover, Milford-on-Sea, and Worthing.
	Cork Harbour Order 1889 Order for amending the Cork Harbour Acts, 1820 to 1883, in relation to the debt of the Commissioners and the Lands of Carrigrennan.	
	Devonport Landing Pier and Breakwater Order 1889 Order for the Construction and Maintenance of a Landing Pier and Breakwater and other Works in the Borough of Devonport in the County of Devon.	
	Dover Promenade Pier Order 1889 Order for the Construction, Maintenance, and Regulation of a Pier and Works at Dover, in the Parish of Saint James the Apostle, in the County of Kent.	
	Milford-on-Sea (Hants) Pier Order 1889 Order for the construction, maintenance and regulation of a Promenade Pier at Milford-on-Sea, in the County of Southampton.	
	Worthing Pier Order 1889 Order for authorising the maintenance of a Pier and other Works at Worthing in the County of Sussex.	
Local Government Board (Ireland) Provisional Order Confirmation (Youghal) Act 1889	52 & 53 Vict. c. xlix	5 July 1889
An Act to confirm a Provisional Order of the Local Government Board for Ireland relating to Youghal.
	Youghal Joint Burial Board Provisional Order 1889 Youghal Joint Burial Board. Provisional Order.	
Windermere District Gas and Water Act 1889	52 & 53 Vict. c. l	5 July 1889
An Act to enable the Windermere District Gas and Water Company to raise additional capital to construct new Waterworks and for other purposes.
Central Argentine Railway Company Act 1889	52 & 53 Vict. c. li	5 July 1889
An Act for amending the Memorandum and Articles of Association of the Central Argentine Railway Company Limited; and for confirming an Agreement between the said Company and the Buenos Ayres Northern Railway Company Limited; and for other purposes.
Padiham Local Board Act 1889 (repealed)	52 & 53 Vict. c. lii	5 July 1889
An Act to empower the Local Board for the district of Padiham and Hapton in the county of Lancaster to construct and maintain additional waterworks and for other purposes. (Repealed by County of Lancashire Act 1984 (c. xxi))
Metropolitan Railway Act 1889	52 & 53 Vict. c. liii	5 July 1889
An Act to confer further powers upon the Metropolitan Railway Company with reference to their Aylesbury and Rickmansworth Railway and their surplus Lands; and for other purposes.
Cleveland Waterworks Act 1889	52 & 53 Vict. c. liv	5 July 1889
An Act to amend the Cleveland Waterworks Acts and for other purposes.
Burnley Corporation Act 1889	52 & 53 Vict. c. lv	5 July 1889
An Act to extend the Boundaries of the Borough of Burnley to confer further Powers upon the Corporation of Burnley with respect to their Gas Undertaking and for other purposes.
Pier and Harbour Orders Confirmation (No. 3) Act 1889	52 & 53 Vict. c. lvi	5 July 1889
An Act to confirm certain Provisional Orders made by the Board of Trade under the General Pier and Harbour Act, 1861, relating to Auchmithie, Balintore, Littlestone, Mostyn, and Sharpness.
	Auchmithie Harbour Order 1889 Order for the construction, maintenance, and regulation of a Harbour at Auchmithie, in the parish of St. Vigeans, in the county of Forfar.	
	Balintore Harbour Order 1889 Order for the construction, maintenance, and regulation of a harbour at Balintore, in the parish of Fearn, in the county of Ross.	
	Littlestone Pier Order 1889 Order for the Construction, Maintenance, and Regulation of a Pier and Works at Littlestone, in the Parish of New Romney, in the County of Kent.	
	Mostyn Dock Order 1889 Order for the Construction of a Dock and other Works, at Mostyn Quay, in the County of Flint.	
	Sharpness Lighthouses Order 1889 Order for lighting and facilitating the Navigation of the River Severn in the vicinity of Sharpness.	
Heywood Corporation Act 1889	52 & 53 Vict. c. lvii	5 July 1889
An Act to extend the time for the construction of certain waterworks authorised by the Heywood Waterworks Act 1877 (Note: Heywood Waterworks Act 1877 (40 & 41 Vict. c. clii)) and to make better provision for the health local government and improvement of the borough of Heywood and for other purposes.
Stapleford and Sandiacre Water Act 1889	52 & 53 Vict. c. lviii	5 July 1889
An Act for incorporating the Stapleford and Sandiacre Water Company and empowering them to construct Waterworks and supply Water and for other purposes.
Saint Helens Corporation Act 1889 (repealed)	52 & 53 Vict. c. lix	5 July 1889
An Act to increase the number of the members of the Council of the Borough of Saint Helens in the County of Lancaster to alter the boundaries of certain of the existing wards of the borough and to create new wards and for other purposes. (Repealed by County of Merseyside Act 1980 (c. x))
North-eastern Railway Act 1889	52 & 53 Vict. c. lx	5 July 1889
An Act for enabling the North-eastern Railway Company to make new Railways; for amalgamating with their undertaking the undertaking of the Whitby Redcar and Middlesborough Union Railway Company; and for other purposes.
Local Government Board's Provisional Orders Confirmation (No. 8) Act 1889	52 & 53 Vict. c. lxi	9 July 1889
An Act to confirm certain Provisional Orders of the Local Government Board relating to the Borough of King's Lynn, the Borough of Sheffield and the Local Government District of Handsworth, the Local Government Districts of Ealing and Romford, and the Improvement Act Districts of Lytham and Mansfield.
	Ealing Order 1889 Provisional Order to enable the Sanitary Authority for the Urban Sanitary District of Ealing to put in force the Compulsory Clauses of the Lands Clauses Consolidation Acts.	
	Kings Lynn Order 1889 Provisional Order for altering the Kings Lynn Corporation Act, 1880. (Note: King's Lynn Corporation Act 1880 (43 & 44 Vict. c. cxlii))	
	Lytham Order 1889 Provisional Order for partially repealing and altering a Local Act (Note: Lytham Improvement Act 1847 (10 & 11 Vict. c. ccli)) and certain Confirming Acts. (Note: Local Government Board's Provisional Orders Confirmation Act 1874 (No. 4) (37 & 38 Vict. c. clii)) (Note: Local Government Board's Provisional Orders Confirmation (Belper Union, &c.) Act 1878 (41 & 42 Vict. c. cix)) (Note: Local Government Board's Provisional Orders Confirmation (Godalming, &c.) Act 1881 (44 & 45 Vict. c. i)) (Note: Local Government Board's Provisional Orders Confirmation (No. 6) Act 1882 (45 & 46 Vict. c. lxiii)) (Note: Local Government Board's Provisional Orders Confirmation (No. 8) Act 1888 (51 & 52 Vict. c. cxxxiii))	
	Mansfield Order 1889 Provisional Order for partially repealing and altering certain Local Acts, (Note: Mansfield Improvement Act 1823 (4 Geo. 4. c. xcii)) (Note: Mansfield Commissioners Gas Act 1878 (41 & 42 Vict. c. cxcvii)) and a Confirming Act. (Note: Local Government Board's Provisional Orders Confirmation Act 1885 (48 & 49 Vict. c. i))	
	Romford Order 1889 Provisional Order for partially repealing and altering a Local Act (Note: Romford Improvement Act 1819 (59 Geo. 3. c. lxxv)) and a Confirming Act. (Note: Public Health Supplemental Act 1851 (No. 2) (14 & 15 Vict. c. 98))	
	Sheffield and Handsworth Order 1889 Provisional Order for altering certain Local Acts. (Note: Sheffield Waterworks Act 1853 (16 & 17 Vict. c. xxii)) (Note: Sheffield Waterworks Act 1860 (23 & 24 Vict. c. lxx)) (Note: Sheffield Waterworks Act 1864 (27 & 28 Vict. c. cccxxiv)) (Note: Sheffield Waterworks Act 1866 (29 & 30 Vict. c. cclxxxvi)) (Note: Sheffield Waterworks (Amendment) Act 1867 (30 & 31 Vict. c. lxxxvii)) (Note: Sheffield Water (New Works) Act 1867 (30 & 31 Vict. c. xcvii)) (Note: Sheffield Waterworks Act 1873 (36 & 37 Vict. c. iii)) (Note: Sheffield Waterworks Act 1881 (44 & 45 Vict. c. xxvi)) (Note: Sheffield Corporation (Water) Act 1887 (50 & 51 Vict. c. clxxviii))	
Local Government Board's Provisional Orders Confirmation (No. 10) Act 1889	52 & 53 Vict. c. lxii	9 July 1889
An Act to confirm certain Provisional Orders of the Local Government Board relating to the Boroughs of Bradford (Yorks), Leeds, and Plymouth, and the Local Government District of Bromley.
	Bradford (Yorks) Order 1889 Provisional Order to enable the Urban Sanitary Authority for the Borough of Bradford (Yorks) to put in force the Compulsory Clauses of the Lands Clauses Consolidation Acts.	
	Bromley Order 1889 Provisional Order to enable the Sanitary Authority for the Urban Sanitary District of Bromley to put in force the Compulsory Clauses of the Lands Clauses Consolidation Acts.	
	Leeds Order 1889 Provisional Order to enable the Urban Sanitary Authority for the Borough of Leeds to put in force the Compulsory Clauses of the Lands Clauses Consolidation Acts.	
	Plymouth Order 1889 Provisional Order to enable the Urban Sanitary Authority for the Borough of Plymouth to put in force the Compulsory Clauses of the Lands Clauses Consolidation Acts.	
Education Department Provisional Order Confirmation (Leake) Act 1889	52 & 53 Vict. c. lxiii	9 July 1889
An Act to confirm a Provisional Order made by the Education Department under the Elementary Education Act, 1870, to enable the School Board for Leake to put in force the Lands Clauses Consolidation Act, 1845, and the Acts amending the same.
	Leake (Lincs.) Order 1889 The School Board for Leake, County of Lincoln. Provisional Order for putting in force the Lands Clauses Consolidation Act, 1845.	
Gas Orders Confirmation Act 1889	52 & 53 Vict. c. lxiv	9 July 1889
An Act to confirm certain Provisional Orders made by the Board of Trade under the Gas and Water Works Facilities Act, 1870, (Note: Gas and Water Works Facilities Act 1870 (33 & 34 Vict. c. 70)) relating to Buckley Gas, Market Rasen Gas, Melton Mowbray Gas, Romford Gas, and Warminster Gas.
	Buckley Gas Order 1889 Order empowering the Buckley Gas Company Limited to construct and maintain Gasworks and to make and supply Gas within parts of the Parishes of Mold and Hawarden, both in the County of Flint.	
	Market Rasen Gas Order 1889 Order empowering the Market Rasen New Lighting Company (Limited) to maintain and continue Gasworks, and to manufacture and supply Gas, within the Parish of Market Rasen and parts of the Parish of Middle Rasen, both in the County of Lincoln.	
	Melton Mowbray Gas Order 1889 Order empowering the Melton Mowbray Gas Light and Coke Company (Limited) to maintain and continue Gasworks and to make and supply Gas within the Parishes of Melton Mowbray and Thorpe Arnold both in the County of Leicester.	
	Romford Gas Order 1889 Order empowering the Romford Gas and Coke Company (Limited) to construct and maintain additional Works and to raise additional Capital.	
	Warminster Gas Order 1889 Order empowering the Warminster Gas and Coke Company to maintain and continue Gas Works and to manufacture and supply Gas within the Parishes of Warminster and Bishopstrow both in the County of Wilts.	
Water Orders Confirmation Act 1889	52 & 53 Vict. c. lxv	9 July 1889
An Act to confirm certain Provisional Orders made by the Board of Trade under the Gas and Water Works Facilities Act, 1870, relating to Brightlingsea Water, Corsham Water, Faversham Water, Harpenden Water, and Llandrindod Wells Water.
	Brightlingsea Water Order 1889 Order empowering the Brightlingsea Water Company, Limited, to maintain and continue Waterworks and to supply Water in the parish of Brightlingsea, in the county of Essex.	
	Corsham Water Order 1889 Order empowering the Corsham Waterworks Company (Limited) to construct and maintain Waterworks and to supply Water in the parishes of Corsham Pewsham and Lacock all in the county of Wilts.	
	Faversham Water Order 1889 Order empowering the Faversham Water Company Limited to maintain and continue Waterworks, and to supply Water in the parishes of Faversham, Preston (including the Brents), Ospringe, Oare, Davington, and Goodnestone, all in the county of Kent.	
	Harpenden Water Order 1889 Order authorising the maintenance and continuance of Waterworks and the supply of Water in the parish of Harpenden in the county of Hertford.	
	Llandrindod Wells Water Order 1889 Order empowering the Llandrindod Wells Water Company to raise additional Capital.	
River Cam Bridges Act 1889	52 & 53 Vict. c. lxvi	9 July 1889
An Act to provide for further Bridge accommodation over the River Cam and approaches thereto and for other purposes.
Neath Harbour Act 1889	52 & 53 Vict. c. lxvii	9 July 1889
An Act to extend the time for the completion of the authorised works for enlarging and improving the Port and Harbour of Neath and for other purposes.
Wakefield Corporation Act 1889	52 & 53 Vict. c. lxviii	9 July 1889
An Act to empower the Corporation of Wakefield to make additional Waterworks and for other purposes.
Cork and Macroom Direct Railway Act 1889	52 & 53 Vict. c. lxix	9 July 1889
An Act for conferring further powers on the Cork and Macroom Direct Railway Company.
Southport and Cheshire Lines Extension Railway Act 1889	52 & 53 Vict. c. lxx	9 July 1889
An Act to regulate the capital of the Southport and Cheshire Lines Extension Railway Company, and to confirm agreements between the Company and other railway companies; and for other purposes.
Cambrian Railways (Steamboats) Act 1889	52 & 53 Vict. c. lxxi	9 July 1889
An Act to authorise the Cambrian Railways Company to provide or build work let and use Steam Vessels in connexion with their system of Railways.
Devonport Waterworks Act 1889	52 & 53 Vict. c. lxxii	9 July 1889
An Act for conferring further powers on the Company of Proprietors of the Plymouth Dock Waterworks for changing the name of the Company and for other purposes.
Selby and Mid-Yorkshire Union Railway (Wistow to Drax) Abandonment Act 1889 (repealed)	52 & 53 Vict. c. lxxiii	9 July 1889
An Act for the abandonment of the railway authorised by the Church Fenton Cawood and Wistow Railway Act 1882. (Note: Church Fenton, Cawood, and Wistow Railway Act 1882 (45 & 46 Vict. c. ccxxiii)) (Repealed by Statute Law (Repeals) Act 2013 (c. 2))
Lancashire and Yorkshire Railway Act 1889	52 & 53 Vict. c. lxxiv	9 July 1889
An Act for conferring further powers on the Lancashire and Yorkshire Railway Company and for other purposes.
Liverpool Corporation Act 1889 (repealed)	52 & 53 Vict. c. lxxv	9 July 1889
An Act to amend the Liverpool Corporation Loans Act, 1880; (Note: Liverpool Corporation Loans Act 1880 (43 & 44 Vict. c. ccvii)) to confer further powers on the Corporation of Liverpool with respect to Markets and Public Libraries within the city; to make further Police and Building Regulations; and for other purposes relating to the Local Government of the city of Liverpool. (Repealed by County of Merseyside Act 1980 (c. x))
Stratford-upon-Avon, Towcester, and Midland Junction Railway Act 1889	52 & 53 Vict. c. lxxvi	9 July 1889
An Act to extend the time for completing the main line of the Stratford-upon-Avon Towcester and Midland Junction Railway; to abandon certain branch railways; and for other purposes.
Eastbourne Waterworks Act 1889	52 & 53 Vict. c. lxxvii	26 July 1889
An Act for conferring further powers on the Eastbourne Waterworks Company.
Rock Life Assurance Act 1889	52 & 53 Vict. c. lxxviii	26 July 1889
An Act to enable the Rock Life Assurance Company to invest a further part of their Assurance Fund in the manner authorised by their Act of 1864. (Note: Rock Life Assurance Act 1864 (27 & 28 Vict. c. lxix))
Alloa Harbour Act 1889	52 & 53 Vict. c. lxxix	26 July 1889
An Act to enable the Trustees of the Port and Harbour of Alloa to construct additional works to raise further money and for other purposes.
King's Lynn Docks and Railway (Further Powers) Act 1889	52 & 53 Vict. c. lxxx	26 July 1889
An Act to confer further powers upon the King's Lynn Docks and Railway Company and for other purposes.
Oswestry and Llangynod Railway (Abandonment) Act 1889 (repealed)	52 & 53 Vict. c. lxxxi	26 July 1889
An Act for the Abandonment of the Oswestry and Llangynog Railway. (Repealed by Statute Law (Repeals) Act 2013 (c. 2))
Dublin, Wicklow, and Wexford Railway (City of Dublin Junction Railways) Act 1889	52 & 53 Vict. c. lxxxii	26 July 1889
An Act to extend the time for the completion of the City of Dublin Junction Railways authorised by the Dublin Wicklow and Wexford Railway (City of Dublin Junction Railways) Act 1884 (Note: Dublin, Wicklow and Wexford Railway (City of Dublin Junction Railways) Act 1884 (47 & 48 Vict. c. clxxxii)) and for other purposes.
Ribble Navigation Act 1889 (repealed)	52 & 53 Vict. c. lxxxiii	26 July 1889
An Act to enable the Mayor Aldermen and Burgesses of the Borough of Preston to borrow additional Moneys for the purposes of the Ribble Navigation and Preston Dock Undertaking and for other purposes. (Repealed by Preston Borough Council Act 1981 (c. xxii))
Cheshire Lines Act 1889	52 & 53 Vict. c. lxxxiv	26 July 1889
An Act for conferring further Powers upon the Cheshire Lines Committee and upon the three Companies represented upon that Committee.
Manchester, Sheffield and Lincolnshire Railway (Steamboats) Act 1889	52 & 53 Vict. c. lxxxv	26 July 1889
An Act to authorise the Manchester Sheffield and Lincolnshire Railway Company to run Steam and other Vessels between Great Grimsby and certain Foreign Ports.
Barry Dock and Railways Act 1889	52 & 53 Vict. c. lxxxvi	26 July 1889
An Act to confer further Powers on the Barry Dock and Railways Company.
Dundee Harbour and Tay Ferries Act 1889 (repealed)	52 & 53 Vict. c. lxxxvii	26 July 1889
An Act for enabling the Trustees of the Harbour of Dundee to transfer to their Harbour Undertaking a part of the Tay Ferries debt, and to raise additional money; and for other purposes. (Repealed by Dundee Harbour and Tay Ferries Consolidation Act 1911 (1 & 2 Geo. 5. c. lxxx))
Folkestone, Sandgate and Hythe Tramways Act 1889	52 & 53 Vict. c. lxxxviii	26 July 1889
An Act to confer further powers upon the Folkestone Sandgate and Hythe Tramways Company and for other purposes.
Glasgow and South-western Railway Act 1889	52 & 53 Vict. c. lxxxix	26 July 1889
An Act for conferring further powers on the Glasgow and South-western Railway Company for the construction of works the acquisition of lands and the raising of money; for abandoning certain railways; and for other purposes.
North British Railway Act 1889 or the North British (Methil Harbour) Act 1889	52 & 53 Vict. c. xc	26 July 1889
An Act to authorise the construction by the North British Railway Company of certain Railways and Works; the maintenance of other Railways; the purchase of additional Lands; and for other purposes.
St. Helens and Wigan Junction Railway Act 1889	52 & 53 Vict. c. xci	26 July 1889
An Act to revive the powers and extend the time for the compulsory purchase of lands for, and to extend the time for the construction of certain authorised railways, to change the name of the St. Helens and Wigan Junction Railway Company, to amend the provisions of the Company's Acts, and to confer further powers upon the Company and others and for other purposes.
Stockton-on-Tees Extension and Improvement Act 1889 (repealed)	52 & 53 Vict. c. xcii	26 July 1889
An Act to extend the Borough of Stockton otherwise called Stockton-on-Tees and for other purposes. (Repealed by Teesside Corporation (General Powers) Act 1971 (c. xv))
Liverpool and Birkenhead Subway Act 1889	52 & 53 Vict. c. xciii	26 July 1889
An Act to confer further powers upon the Liverpool and Birkenhead Subway Company; and for other purposes.
Great Northern Railway Act 1889	52 & 53 Vict. c. xciv	26 July 1889
An Act to confer further powers upon the Great Northern Railway Company with respect to their own undertaking and undertakings in which they are jointly interested and for other purposes.
Waterford Corporation (Debenture Stock) Act 1889	52 & 53 Vict. c. xcv	26 July 1889
An Act to authorise the Corporation of the borough of Waterford to consolidate and convert their debt by the creation and issue of debenture stock.
West Bromwich Corporation (Consolidation of Loans) Act 1889 (repealed)	52 & 53 Vict. c. xcvi	26 July 1889
An Act to authorise the Mayor Aldermen and Burgesses of the Borough of West Bromwich to create and issue Corporation Stock and for other purposes. (Repealed by West Bromwich Corporation Act 1969 (c. lix))
Belfast and Northern Counties and Ballymena and Larne Railway Companies Amalgamation Act 1889	52 & 53 Vict. c. xcvii	26 July 1889
An Act for amalgamating the Ballymena and Larne Railway Company with the Belfast and Northern Counties Railway Company.
London and North-Western Railway Act 1889	52 & 53 Vict. c. xcviii	26 July 1889
An Act for conferring further Powers upon the London and North-Western Railway Company in relation to their own Undertaking and other Undertakings in which they are interested jointly with other Companies and also for conferring powers upon the North London Railway Company and other Railway Companies in relation to such other Undertakings for vesting portions of the North Union Railway in the Company and the Lancashire and Yorkshire Railway Company respectively and for other purposes.
Hull Docks Act 1889	52 & 53 Vict. c. xcix	26 July 1889
An Act to authorise the Dock Company at Kingston-upon-Hull to make a Deep-water Entrance to their Albert Dock, and other Works; and for other Purposes.
Scottish Equitable Life Assurance Act 1889 (repealed)	52 & 53 Vict. c. c	26 July 1889
An Act to amend and extend some of the powers of the Scottish Equitable Life Assurance Society and for other purposes relating thereto. (Repealed by Scottish Equitable Life Assurance Society Act 1902 (2 Edw. 7. c. xxxviii))
Tees Conservancy Act 1889	52 & 53 Vict. c. ci	26 July 1889
An Act for conferring further powers on the Tees Conservancy Commissioners with respect to the sale or leasing of reclaimed lands and minerals for amending the Tees Conservancy Acts and for other purposes.
Didcot, Newbury and Southampton Railway Act 1889	52 & 53 Vict. c. cii	26 July 1889
An Act to enable the Didcot Newbury and Southampton Railway Company to abandon certain portions of their authorised Railways and for other purposes.
Manchester, Sheffield, and Lincolnshire Railway Act 1889	52 & 53 Vict. c. ciii	26 July 1889
An Act to authorise the Manchester Sheffield and Lincolnshire Railway Company to make new Railways to confer further powers on the Company in connexion with their Undertaking; and for other purposes.
Dundee Suburban Railway Act 1889	52 & 53 Vict. c. civ	26 July 1889
An Act to extend the time for the completion of the Railways authorised by the Dundee Suburban Railway Act 1884 (Note: Dundee Suburban Railway Act 1884 (47 & 48 Vict. c. clxxii)) and for other purposes.
Eastbourne, Seaford, and Newhaven Railway Act 1889 (repealed)	52 & 53 Vict. c. cv	26 July 1889
An Act for conferring further powers on the Eastbourne Seaford and Newhaven Railway Company and for other purposes. (Repealed by Eastbourne, Seaford and Newhaven Railway (Abandonment) Act 1892 (55 & 56 Vict. c. lxxix))
Water of Leith Purification and Sewerage Act 1889 (repealed)	52 & 53 Vict. c. cvi	26 July 1889
An Act to provide for the Purification of the Water of Leith, and the tributaries thereof, in the county of Midlothian, and the construction of Works in connexion therewith; and for the constitution and incorporation of Commissioners; and for other purposes. (Repealed by Edinburgh Corporation Order Confirmation Act 1964 (c. xli))
Local Government Board's Provisional Orders Confirmation (No. 7) Act 1889	52 & 53 Vict. c. cvii	26 July 1889
An Act to confirm certain Provisional Orders of the Local Government Board relating to the Boroughs of Aberavon and Kingston-upon-Hull, the Local Government Districts of Bingley and Cuckfield, and the Faversham Joint Hospital District.
	Aberavon Order 1889 Provisional Order for altering a Local Act (Note: Aberavon Market Act 1848 (11 & 12 Vict. c. cxxxviii)) and a Confirming Act. (Note: Local Government Board's Provisional Orders Confirmation Act 1886 (49 & 50 Vict. c. xvii))	
	Bingley Order 1889 Provisional Order to enable the Sanitary Authority for the Urban Sanitary District of Bingley to put in force the Compulsory Clauses of the Lands Clauses Consolidation Acts.	
	Cuckfield Order 1889 Provisional Order to enable the Sanitary Authority for the Urban Sanitary District of Cuckfield to put in force the Compulsory Clauses of the Lands Clauses Consolidation Acts.	
	Faversham Order 1889 Provisional Order for altering a Confirming Act. (Note: Local Government Board's Provisional Orders Confirmation (No. 3) Act 1883 (46 & 47 Vict. c. lxxxix))	
	Kingston-upon-Hull Order 1889 Provisional Order for altering the Kingston-upon-Hull Improvement Act, 1854. (Note: Kingston-upon-Hull Improvement Act 1854 (17 & 18 Vict. c. ci))	
Leven Water Supply Confirmation Act 1889	52 & 53 Vict. c. cviii	26 July 1889
An Act to confirm a Provisional Order under the Public Health (Scotland) Act, 1867, (Note: Public Health (Scotland) Act 1867 (30 & 31 Vict. c. 101)) relating to Leven Water.
	Leven Water Order 1889 Leven Water. Public Health (Scotland) Act, 1867 (30 & 31 Vict. c. 101.) Provisional Order.	
Motherwell Water Supply Confirmation Act 1889	52 & 53 Vict. c. cix	26 July 1889
An Act to confirm a Provisional Order under the Public Health (Scotland) Act, 1867, and the Acts amending the same relating to Motherwell Water.
	Motherwell Water Order 1889 Motherwell Water. Public Health (Scotland) Act, 1867, and Acts amending the same. Provisional Order.	
Tramways Orders Confirmation (No. 1) Act 1889	52 & 53 Vict. c. cx	26 July 1889
An Act to confirm certain Provisional Orders made by the Board of Trade under the Tramways Act, 1870, (Note: Tramways Act 1870 (33 & 34 Vict. c. 78)) relating to Lancaster and District Tramways, Lincolnshire Tramways, and Stockport and Hazel Grove Tramways.
	Lancaster and District Tramways Order 1889 Order authorising the construction of tramways in the parish of Lancaster in the county of Lancaster.	
	Lincolnshire Tramways Order 1889 Order authorising the Lincolnshire Road Railways Company Limited to construct additional Tramways in the City and County of the City of Lincoln.	
	Stockport and Hazel Grove Tramways Order 1889 Order authorising the construction of Tramways in the parishes of Stockport and Cheadle in the county of Chester.	
Tramways Orders Confirmation (No. 2) Act 1889	52 & 53 Vict. c. cxi	26 July 1889
An Act to confirm certain Provisional Orders made by the Board of Trade under the Tramways Act, 1870, relating to Gosport, Alverstoke, and Bury Cross Tramways, Newport and Parkhurst Tramways, and Oldham, Ashton-under-Lyne, and Hyde District Tramways.
	Gosport, Alverstoke, and Bury Cross Tramways Order 1889 Order authorising the construction of Tramways in the Parish of Alverstoke in the County of Southampton.	
	Newport and Parkhurst Tramways Order 1889 Order authorising the construction of Tramways in the Borough of Newport and Parish of Carisbrooke in the Isle of Wight and County of Southampton.	
	Oldham, Ashton-under-Lyne, and Hyde District Tramways Order 1889 Order authorising the construction of Tramways in the Borough of Ashton-under-Lyne, and the Local Board Districts of Denton and Haughton, and Audenshaw, and the District of the Ashton-under-Lyne Rural Sanitary Authority, all in the County of Lancaster.	
Local Government Board's Provisional Orders Confirmation (No. 9) Act 1889	52 & 53 Vict. c. cxii	26 July 1889
An Act to confirm certain Provisional Orders of the Local Government Board relating to the Boroughs of Blandford Forum, Lyme Regis, Lymington, and Morpeth.
	Borough of Blandford Forum Order 1889 Provisional Order made in pursuance of Section 52 of the Local Government Act, 1888.	
	Borough of Lyme Regis Order 1889 Provisional Order made in pursuance of Section 52 of the Local Government Act, 1888, and under Section 303 of the Public Health Act, 1875.	
	Borough of Lymington Order 1889 Provisional Order made in pursuance of Section 52 of the Local Government Act, 1888.	
	Borough of Morpeth Order 1889 Provisional Order made in pursuance of Section 52 of the Local Government Act, 1888, and under Section 297 of the Public Health Act, 1875.	
Local Government Board's Provisional Orders Confirmation (No. 11) Act 1889	52 & 53 Vict. c. cxiii	26 July 1889
An Act to confirm certain Provisional Orders of the Local Government Board relating to the Boroughs of Halifax, Nottingham, and Southampton, the Improvement Act District of Newton-in-Mackerfield, and the Local Government District of Ince-in-Makerfield.
	Halifax Order 1889 Provisional Order for altering a Local Act (Note: Halifax Water and Gas Extension Act 1876 (39 & 40 Vict. c. ccxxxiv)) and Confirming Act. (Note: Local Government Board's Provisional Orders Confirmation (Halifax, &c.) Act 1881 (44 & 45 Vict. c. lxvi))	
	Ince-in-Makerfield Order 1889 Provisional Order for partially repealing and altering a Local Act. (Note: Ince Water Act 1871 (34 & 35 Vict. c. c))	
	Newton-in-Mackerfield Order 1889 Provisional Order for altering a Local Act. (Note: Newton District Improvement Act 1855 (18 & 19 Vict. c. c))	
	Nottingham Order 1889 Provisional Order for altering the Nottingham Improvement Act, 1878. (Note: Nottingham Improvement Act 1878 (41 & 42 Vict. c. xci))	
	Southampton Order 1889 Provisional Order for altering the Southampton Corporation Act, 1885. (Note: Southampton Corporation Act 1885 (48 & 49 Vict. c. clxx))	
Local Government Board's Provisional Orders Confirmation (No. 12) Act 1889	52 & 53 Vict. c. cxiv	26 July 1889
An Act to confirm certain Provisional Orders of the Local Government Board relating to the Boroughs of Bangor, Buckingham, Carnarvon, and Ramsgate, the Port of Harwich, and the Rural Sanitary District of the Houghton-le-Spring Union.
	Bangor Order 1889 Provisional Order for altering the Bangor Local Board Act, 1878. (Note: Bangor Local Board Act 1878 (41 & 42 Vict. c. cxix))	
	Buckingham Order 1889 Provisional Order to enable the Urban Sanitary Authority for the Borough of Buckingham to put in force the Compulsory Clauses of the Lands Clauses Consolidation Acts.	
	Carnarvon Order 1889 Provisional Order for altering the Carnarvon Waterworks Act, 1865. (Note: Carnarvon Waterworks Act 1865 (28 & 29 Vict. c. xcix))	
	Harwich Order 1889 Provisional Order for altering a Confirming Act. (Note: Local Government Board's Provisional Orders Confirmation (Acton, &c.) Act 1881 (44 & 45 Vict. c. clxii))	
	Houghton-le-Spring Union Order 1889 Provisional Order to enable the Sanitary Authority for the Rural Sanitary District of the Houghton-le-Spring Union to put in force the Compulsory Clauses of the Lands Clauses Consolidation Acts.	
	Ramsgate Order 1889 Provisional Order for altering certain Local Acts (Note: Ramsgate Local Board Act 1877 (40 & 41 Vict. c. cxix)) (Note: Ramsgate Improvement Act 1878 (41 & 42 Vict. c. cxciii)) and Confirming Acts. (Note: Local Government Board's Provisional Orders Confirmation (Eastbourne, &c.) Act 1880 (43 & 44 Vict. c. cxxxii)) (Note: Local Government Board's Provisional Orders Confirmation (Kingston-upon-Hull, &c.) Act 1880 (43 & 44 Vict. c. lxxxiv))	
Local Government Board's Provisional Orders Confirmation (No. 13) Act 1889	52 & 53 Vict. c. cxv	26 July 1889
An Act to confirm certain Provisional Orders of the Local Government Board relating to the Boroughs of Blackburn, Dover, and West Ham, and the Local Government Districts of Denton and Haughton, Dukinfield, and Tipton.
	Blackburn Order 1889 Provisional Order for altering certain Local Acts. (Note: Blackburn Improvement Act 1854 (17 & 18 Vict. c. clxxxiii)) (Note: Blackburn Waterworks Act 1875 (38 & 39 Vict. c. cxxxvi)) (Note: Blackburn Improvement Act 1879 (42 & 43 Vict. c. cxvi)) (Note: Blackburn Improvement Act 1882 (45 & 46 Vict. c. ccxliii))	
	Denton and Haughton Order 1889 Provisional Order for altering certain Local Acts (Note: Dukinfield and Denton Local Boards (Gas) Act 1877 (40 & 41 Vict. c. cxc)) (Note: Denton and Haughton Gas Act 1880 (43 & 44 Vict. c. xvii)) and Confirming Acts. (Note: Local Government Board's Provisional Orders Confirmation (No. 8) Act 1884 (47 & 48 Vict. c. ccxv)) (Note: Local Government Board's Provisional Orders Confirmation (No. 6) Act 1886 (50 Vict. c. viii))	
	Dover Order 1889 Provisional Order for altering certain Local Acts (Note: Dover Streets Act 1778 (18 Geo. 3. c. 76)) (Note: Dover Improvement Act 1810 (50 Geo. 3. c. xxvi)) (Note: Dover Markets Act 1826 (7 Geo. 4. c. v)) (Note: Dover Improvement Act 1830 (11 Geo. 4 & 1 Will. 4. c. cxvii)) (Note: Dover Improvement Act 1835 (5 & 6 Will. 4. c. xlvii)) and a Confirming Act. (Note: Public Health Supplemental Act 1850 (13 & 14 Vict. c. 32))	
	Dukinfield Order 1889 Provisional Order for partially repealing and altering a Local Act.	
	Tipton Order 1889 Provisional Order for altering and partially repealing the Tipton Local Board (Gas) Act, 1876. (Note: Tipton Local Board (Gas) Act 1876 (39 & 40 Vict. c. cxlviii))	
	West Ham Order 1889 Provisional Order for altering a Local Act. (Note: West Ham Corporation (Improvements) Act 1888 (51 & 52 Vict. c. clxxix))	
Local Government Board's Provisional Orders Confirmation (No. 15) Act 1889	52 & 53 Vict. c. cxvi	26 July 1889
An Act to confirm certain Provisional Orders of the Local Government Board relating to the Boroughs of Banbury and Cambridge.
	Borough of Banbury Order 1889 Provisional Order made in pursuance of Section 52 of the Local Government Act, 1888, and under Section 297 of the Public Health Act, 1875.	
	Borough of Cambridge Order 1889 Provisional Order made in pursuance of Section 52 of the Local Government Act, 1888, and under Section 297 of the Public Health Act, 1875.	
Local Government Board's Provisional Orders Confirmation (No. 16) Act 1889	52 & 53 Vict. c. cxvii	26 July 1889
An Act to confirm certain Provisional Orders of the Local Government Board relating to the City of Manchester and the Boroughs of Middleton and Stafford.
	Manchester Order 1889 Provisional Order for partially repealing and altering certain Local Acts. (Note: Manchester Improvement Act 1845 (8 & 9 Vict. c. cxli)) (Note: Manchester General Improvement Act 1851 (14 & 15 Vict. c. cxix)) (Note: Manchester Improvement Act 1854 (17 & 18 Vict. c. xxviii)) (Note: Manchester Improvement Act 1865 (28 & 29 Vict. c. xc)) (Note: Manchester Corporation Waterworks and Improvement Act 1867 (30 & 31 Vict. c. xxxvi)) (Note: Manchester Corporation Waterworks and Improvement Act 1869 (32 & 33 Vict. c. cxvii)) (Note: Manchester Improvement Act 1871 (34 & 35 Vict. c. lxv)) (Note: Manchester Corporation Waterworks and Improvement Act 1872 (35 & 36 Vict. c. xxxi)) (Note: Manchester Corporation Waterworks and Improvement Act 1875 (38 & 39 Vict. c. clxi))	
	Middleton Order 1889 Provisional Order for altering a Local Act. (Note: Middleton and Tonge Improvement Act 1861 (24 & 25 Vict. c. c))	
	Stafford Order 1889 Provisional Order for partially repealing and altering certain Local Acts (Note: Stafford Corporation Act 1876 (39 & 40 Vict. c. cxcvi)) (Note: Stafford Corporation Act 1880 (43 & 44 Vict. c. lxxiii)) and Confirming Acts. (Note: Local Government Board's Provisional Orders Confirmation (No. 3) Act 1882 (45 & 46 Vict. c. lxi)) (Note: Local Government Board's Provisional Orders Confirmation (No. 5) Act 1885 (48 & 49 Vict. c. lxii)) (Note: Local Government Board's Provisional Orders Confirmation (No. 8) Act 1887 (50 & 51 Vict. c. cxii))	
Local Government Board's Provisional Order Confirmation (Poor Law) Act 1889 (repealed)	52 & 53 Vict. c. cxviii	26 July 1889
An Act to confirm a Provisional Order of the Local Government Board under the Provisions of the Poor Law Amendment Act, 1867, (Note: Poor Law Amendment Act 1867 (30 & 31 Vict. c. 106)) as amended by the Poor Law Amendment Act, 1868, (Note: Poor Law Amendment Act 1868 (31 & 32 Vict. c. 122)) and extended by the Poor Law Act, 1879, (Note: Poor Law Act 1879 (42 & 43 Vict. c. 54)) relating to the Parish of Saint James, Westminster. (Repealed by Statute Law (Repeals) Act 2013 (c. 2))
	Saint James Westminster Order 1889 Provisional Order for partially repealing and altering certain Local Acts. (Note: St. James, Westminster (Poor Relief, etc.) Act 1762 (2 Geo. 3. c. 58)) (Note: St. James Westminster Poor Relief Act 1816 (56 Geo. 3. c. liv))	
Gas and Water Orders Confirmation Act 1889	52 & 53 Vict. c. cxix	26 July 1889
An Act to confirm certain Provisional Orders made by the Board of Trade under the Gas and Water Works Facilities Act, 1870, relating to St. Ives (Hunts) Gas, Otley Gas, Pocklington Water, and Marlow Water.
	St. Ives (Hunts) Gas Order 1889 Order empowering the St. Ives (Hunts) Gas Company (Limited) to maintain and continue Gasworks and to make and supply Gas in the Parishes of St. Ives Fenstanton Hemingford Grey and Hemingford Abbots all in the County of Huntingdon.	
	Otley Gas Order 1889 Order empowering the Otley Gas Company to maintain and continuе Gasworks and to manufacture and supply Gas within the parishes townships or places of Otley Newall-with-Clifton Farnley and Weston all in the West Riding of the County of York.	
	Pocklington Water Order 1889 Order empowering the Pocklington Water Company, Limited, to construct and maintain Waterworks, and to supply Water, in the Parish of Pocklington, in the East Riding of the County of York.	
	Marlow Water Order 1889 Order empowering the Great Marlow Water Company (Limited) to maintain and continue Waterworks and to supply Water in the Parishes of Great Marlow Little Marlow Wooburn and Medmenham all in the County of Bucks and Bisham in the County of Berks.	
Winchester Burgesses Disqualification Removal Act 1889	52 & 53 Vict. c. cxx	26 July 1889
An Act for the removal of the disqualification of certain Burgesses of the City of Winchester.
East and West Yorkshire Union Railways Act 1889	52 & 53 Vict. c. cxxi	12 August 1889
An Act for the Abandonment of part of the authorised Railways of the East and West Yorkshire Union Railways Company and for other purposes.
New Oriental Bank Corporation Limited Act 1889	52 & 53 Vict. c. cxxii	12 August 1889
An Act to explain and define the powers of the New Oriental Bank Corporation Limited and for other purposes.
Bridlington Local Board Act 1889	52 & 53 Vict. c. cxxiii	12 August 1889
An Act to confer further powers upon the Local Board for the District of Bridlington in relation to the Princes Parade and for other purposes.
London Tramways Company Extensions Act 1889	52 & 53 Vict. c. cxxiv	12 August 1889
An Act to authorise the London Tramways Company (Limited) to extend their tramway system to Lower Tooting and Streatham and for other purposes.
Plymouth, Devonport and South Western Junction Railway Act 1889	52 & 53 Vict. c. cxxv	12 August 1889
An Act to authorise the Plymouth Devonport and South Western Junction Railway Company to abandon a certain portion of their undertaking and to confer on them further powers.
Shortlands and Nunhead Railway Act 1889	52 & 53 Vict. c. cxxvi	12 August 1889
An Act for incorporating the Shortlands and Nunhead Railway Company and for authorising the Construction of a Railway in the Counties of Kent and Surrey and for other purposes.
City of London Police Superannuation Act 1889 (repealed)	52 & 53 Vict. c. cxxvii	12 August 1889
An Act for providing a scale of Pensions and Gratuities in the Police Force of the City of London and for other purposes. (Repealed by Statute Law (Repeals) Act 2008 (c. 12))
Woodhall Spa (Gas and Water) Act 1889	52 & 53 Vict. c. cxxviii	12 August 1889
An Act for incorporating and conferring powers on the Woodhall Spa Gas and Water Company.
Dublin Corporation Loans Act 1889 (repealed)	52 & 53 Vict. c. cxxix	12 August 1889
An Act to authorise the Right Honourable the Lord Mayor, Aldermen and Burgesses of Dublin to consolidate their Loans and create Corporation Stock; and for other purposes. (Repealed by Statute Law (Repeals) Act 2013 (c. 2))
Rastrick Waterworks Act 1889 (repealed)	52 & 53 Vict. c. cxxx	12 August 1889
An Act for dissolving the Rastrick Waterworks Company Limited for re-incorporating the Proprietors therein with others and for conferring Powers on the Company so to be incorporated and for other purposes. (Repealed by West Yorkshire Act 1980 (c. xiv))
South Kent Water Act 1889	52 & 53 Vict. c. cxxxi	12 August 1889
An Act for incorporating the South Kent Water Company and empowering them to construct Works and supply Water and for other purposes.
Margate Coal Dues Act 1889	52 & 53 Vict. c. cxxxii	12 August 1889
An Act for the reduction of the dues payable on coal culm splint coke or cinders imported or brought into the town of Margate and for other purposes.
Wirral Railway Transfer Act 1889	52 & 53 Vict. c. cxxxiii	12 August 1889
An Act to authorise the transfer of certain portions of the Undertaking of the Wirral Railway Company to the Manchester Sheffield and Lincolnshire and the Wrexham Mold and Connah's Quay Railway Companies and for other purposes.
West Highland Railway Act 1889	52 & 53 Vict. c. cxxxiv	12 August 1889
An Act to incorporate the West Highland Railway Company and to empower them to construct Railways in the counties of Dumbarton Perth Argyll and Inverness and for other purposes.
Welsh Railways Through Traffic Act 1889	52 & 53 Vict. c. cxxxv	12 August 1889
An Act to authorise Agreements between the Barry Dock and Railways Company Alexandra (Newport and South Wales) Docks and Railway Company Brecon and Merthyr Tydfil Junction Neath and Brecon Pontypridd Caerphilly and Newport Swansea and Mumbles Cambrian Wrexham and Ellesmere Wrexham Mold and Connah's Quay Manchester Sheffield and Lincolnshire Cheshire Lines Committee Wirral Seacombe Hoylake and Deeside Mersey Liverpool Southport and Preston Junction Southport and Cheshire Lines Extension West Lancashire and Blackpool Railway Companies or some of them for the purpose of Through Traffic; to authorise the appointment of a Joint Committee; and for other purposes.
Taunton Corporation Act 1889	52 & 53 Vict. c. cxxxvi	12 August 1889
An Act to authorise the Mayor Aldermen and Burgesses of the Borough of Taunton to consolidate their Loans and create Debenture Stock; and for other purposes.
Wisbech Corporation Act 1889	52 & 53 Vict. c. cxxxvii	12 August 1889
An Act to empower the Mayor Aldermen and Burgesses of the borough of Wisbech to construct a Quay or River Wall at Wisbech and to authorise them to create Debenture Stock and to authorise the Great Eastern Railway Company to construct a Railway at Wisbech and for other purposes.
East Kent District Water Act 1889	52 & 53 Vict. c. cxxxviii	12 August 1889
An Act for incorporating the East Kent District Water Company and empowering them to construct Works and supply Water and for other purposes.
Great Western Railway Act 1889	52 & 53 Vict. c. cxxxix	12 August 1889
An Act for conferring further powers upon the Great Western Railway Company in connexion with their own and other undertakings and upon them and other Companies in connexion with undertakings in which they are jointly interested for authorising and confirming Agreements with other Railway Companies and for other purposes.
Mersey Docks and Harbour Board Act 1889	52 & 53 Vict. c. cxl	12 August 1889
An Act for the abandonment of parts of the Railways authorised by the Mersey Docks and Harbour Board (Overhead Railways) Acts 1882 (Note: Mersey Docks and Harbour Board (Overhead Railways) Act 1882 (45 & 46 Vict. c. cciv)) and 1887 (Note: Mersey Docks and Harbour Board (Overhead Railways) Act 1887 (50 & 51 Vict. c. cxxxix)) and to authorise the Mersey Docks and Harbour Board to make and maintain a Railway in substitution therefor to empower the Board to alter the Ferry Landing Stage at Liverpool to amend in various respects the Acts relating to the Board; and for other purposes.
Cowbridge and Aberthaw Railway Act 1889	52 & 53 Vict. c. cxli	12 August 1889
An Act to incorporate a Company for the Construction of a Railway between Cowbridge and Aberthaw; and for other purposes.
North British and Mercantile Insurance Company's (Scottish Provisional Transfer) Act 1889 (repealed)	52 & 53 Vict. c. cxlii	12 August 1889
An Act to authorise the Scottish Provincial Assurance Company to transfer their Undertaking to the North British and Mercantile Insurance Company; to provide for the consideration for such transfer; and for other purposes. (Repealed by North British and Mercantile Insurance Company's Act 1920 (10 & 11 Geo. 5. c. cxxxii))
Provident Life Office Act 1889	52 & 53 Vict. c. cxliii	12 August 1889
An Act to repeal an Act passed in the year 1807 intituled "An Act to enable the Provident Institution to sue in the name of their managing director and to inrol Annuities" (Note: Provident Institution Act 1807 (47 Geo. 3 Sess. 1. c. xxxiv)) and an Act passed in the year 1810 (Note: Provident Institution Act 1810 (50 Geo. 3. c. xxxii)) amending the said Act and to alter the name of and to confer further powers on the Provident Institution and for other purposes.
Imperial Fire Insurance Act 1889	52 & 53 Vict. c. cxliv	12 August 1889
An Act to make better provision for vesting the Securities and Property of the Imperial Fire Insurance Company in the Trustees of the Company and to amend the Deed of Settlement and Acts of Parliament of the Company and for other purposes.
Rhymney Railway (Capital) Act 1889	52 & 53 Vict. c. cxlv	12 August 1889
An Act for consolidating the Preference Stocks of the Rhymney Railway Company; and for other purposes.
Mersey Railway Act 1889	52 & 53 Vict. c. cxlvi	12 August 1889
An Act to extend the time for the purchase of land and for the completion of the railways in Liverpool and to abandon the railways in Birkenhead authorised by the Mersey Railway Act 1887 (Note: Mersey Railway Act 1887 (50 & 51 Vict. c. cxciii)) and for other purposes.
Metropolitan Improvements Act 1889 (repealed)	52 & 53 Vict. c. cxlvii	12 August 1889
An Act to confer further powers on the London County Council as to Streets and Open Spaces and for other purposes. (Repealed by Local Law (Greater London Council and Inner London Boroughs) Order 1965 (SI 1965/540))
Southwark and Deptford Tramways Act 1889	52 & 53 Vict. c. cxlviii	12 August 1889
An Act for empowering the Southwark and Deptford Tramways Company to construct New Tramways and for other purposes.
Corporation of London (Tower Bridge) Act 1889	52 & 53 Vict. c. cxlix	12 August 1889
An Act to alter amend and extend the Corporation of London (Tower Bridge) Act 1885 (Note: Corporation of London (Tower Bridge) Act 1885 (48 & 49 Vict. c. cxcv)) to extend the time limited for the construction of the works by that Act authorised to authorise the alteration of certain streets and for other purposes.
Liverpool and London and Globe Insurance Company's Act 1889 (repealed)	52 & 53 Vict. c. cl	12 August 1889
An Act for extending and amending the Acts relating to the Liverpool and London and Globe Insurance Company, and for other purposes. (Repealed by Liverpool and London and Globe Insurance Company's Act 1904 (4 Edw. 7. c. xxxiv))
Newport, Godshill, and St. Lawrence Railway Act 1889	52 & 53 Vict. c. cli	12 August 1889
An Act to authorise the Shanklin and Chale Railway Company to make a railway from the Newport Junction Railway at Merston to St. Lawrence in the Isle of Wight; and to abandon certain authorised railways; and for other purposes.
Newport (Monmouthshire) Corporation Act 1889	52 & 53 Vict. c. clii	12 August 1889
An Act to extend the Borough of Newport in the County of Monmouth and to enable the Mayor Aldermen and Burgesses thereof to execute certain improvements and works and to make further provision for the improvement and good government of the borough and for other purposes.
Burry Port and North Western Junction Railway (Abandonment) Act 1889 (repealed)	52 & 53 Vict. c. cliii	12 August 1889
An Act for the abandonment of the Burry Port and North Western Junction Railway. (Repealed by Statute Law (Repeals) Act 2013 (c. 2))
Hull, Barnsley, and West Riding Junction Railway and Dock Act 1889	52 & 53 Vict. c. cliv	12 August 1889
An Act to confer further powers upon and to amend the Acts relating to the Hull Barnsley and West Riding Junction Railway and Dock Company with respect to the Raising of Money; and for other purposes.
Belfast Water Act 1889	52 & 53 Vict. c. clv	12 August 1889
An Act to authorise the Belfast Water Commissioners to construct Works for filtering the supply of Water to the City of Belfast and the Suburban Districts adjacent thereto to confer further powers on the Commissioners and for other purposes.
Dee Conservancy Act 1889	52 & 53 Vict. c. clvi	12 August 1889
An Act for the Conservancy and Improvement of the River Dee.
Newry Improvement Act 1889	52 & 53 Vict. c. clvii	12 August 1889
An Act for the Improvement of the Town of Newry; and to confer further powers on the Town Commissioners of Newry; and for other purposes.
Lea Bridge, Leyton, and Walthamstow Tramways Act 1889	52 & 53 Vict. c. clviii	12 August 1889
An Act for dissolving the Lea Bridge Leyton and Walthamstow Tramways Company Limited and incorporating a new Company and for vesting in such new Company the powers conferred by the Lea Bridge Leyton and Walthamstow Tramways Act 1881 (Note: Lea Bridge, Leyton and Walthamstow Tramways Act 1881 (44 & 45 Vict. c. clxx)) and for conferring upon them further powers for the construction of new Tramways and for other purposes.
South-Eastern Railway Act 1889	52 & 53 Vict. c. clix	12 August 1889
An Act for conferring on the South-Eastern Railway Company various Powers in connexion with their Undertaking and with those of other Companies, and for other purposes.
West Ham Gas Act 1889	52 & 53 Vict. c. clx	12 August 1889
An Act to empower the West Ham Gas Company to raise additional capital for the purposes of their Undertaking and to make other provisions in respect thereof.
Bournemouth Park Lands Act 1889 (repealed)	52 & 53 Vict. c. clxi	12 August 1889
An Act for Appropriating Preserving and Improving certain Lands within the parishes of Christchurch and Holdenhurst in the County of Southampton for the purposes of Parks or Open Spaces. (Repealed by Bournemouth Borough Council Act 1985 (c. v))
Blackpool Railway Act 1889	52 & 53 Vict. c. clxii	12 August 1889
An Act to confer further powers on the Blackpool Railway Company.
Midland and South-western Junction Railway Act 1889	52 & 53 Vict. c. clxiii	12 August 1889
An Act to enable the Midland and South-western Junction Railway Company to abandon a certain railway and for other purposes.
Scarborough Improvement Act 1889	52 & 53 Vict. c. clxiv	12 August 1889
An Act to discontinue the division of the parish of Scarborough into townships and to make further and better provision for the improvement health and good government of the borough of Scarborough to authorise the Corporation of the said borough to construct new works and to raise further moneys and for other purposes.
Chesham, Boxmoor, and Hemel Hempstead Tramroads Act 1889	52 & 53 Vict. c. clxv	12 August 1889
An Act for altering the gauge of the Chesham Boxmoor and Hemel Hempsted Steam Tramways and for changing the name of the Company; and for other purposes.
Glasgow Harbour Tunnel Act 1889 (repealed)	52 & 53 Vict. c. clxvi	12 August 1889
An Act for making a tunnel under the River Clyde at Glasgow; and for other purposes. (Repealed by Glasgow Corporation Order Confirmation Act 1927 (17 & 18 Geo. 5. c. lix))
Great Torrington Commons Act 1889	52 & 53 Vict. c. clxvii	12 August 1889
An Act for vesting Great Torrington Common Castle Hill Common and other lands in the borough of Great Torrington in the county of Devon in a body of Conservators and to settle questions between the commoners of Great Torrington and the owners of the Rolle Estate; and for other purposes.
Local Government Board (Ireland) Provisional Order Confirmation (Tipperary Waterworks) Act 1889	52 & 53 Vict. c. clxviii	12 August 1889
An Act to confirm a Provisional Order of the Local Government Board for Ireland relating to Tipperary Waterworks.
	Tipperary Waterworks Provisional Order 1889 Tipperary Waterworks. The Local Government Board for Ireland. Provisional Order.	
Local Government Board (Ireland) Provisional Order Confirmation (Killiney and Ballybrack) Act 1889	52 & 53 Vict. c. clxix	12 August 1889
An Act to confirm a Provisional Order of the Local Government Board for Ireland relating to Killiney and Ballybrack.
	Killiney and Ballybrack Provisional Order 1889 Killiney and Ballybrack Township. The Local Government Board for Ireland. Provisional Order.	
Local Government Board (Ireland) Provisional Order Confirmation (Castleisland Waterworks) Act 1889	52 & 53 Vict. c. clxx	12 August 1889
An Act to confirm a Provisional Order of the Local Government Board for Ireland relating to Castleisland Waterworks.
	Castleisland Waterworks Provisional Order 1889 Castleisland Waterworks. The Local Government Board for Ireland. Provisional Order.	
Local Government Board's Provisional Orders Confirmation (No. 3) Act 1889	52 & 53 Vict. c. clxxi	12 August 1889
An Act to confirm certain Provisional Orders of the Local Government Board relating to the Local Government Districts of Barnard Castle and Malton, and to the Counties of York and Durham.
	Barnard Castle Order 1889 Provisional Order for diminishing the Local Government District of Barnard Castle, and for other purposes.	
	Malton Order 1889 Provisional Order for diminishing the Local Government District of Malton, and for other purposes.	
	York Order 1889 Provisional Order made in pursuance of Section 54 of the Local Government Act, 1888.	
	York and Durham Order 1889 Provisional Order made in pursuance of Section 54 of the Local Government Act, 1888.	
Local Government Board's Provisional Orders Confirmation (No. 14) Act 1889	52 & 53 Vict. c. clxxii	12 August 1889
An Act to confirm certain Provisional Orders of the Local Government Board relating to the Boroughs of Faversham, Dunneheved, otherwise Launceston, and Saint Ives (Hunts).
	Borough of Faversham Order 1889 Provisional Order made in pursuance of Section 52 of the Local Government Act, 1888.	
	Borough of Launceston Order 1889 Provisional Order made in pursuance of Section 52 of the Local Government Act, 1888, and under Section 297 of the Public Health Act, 1875.	
	Borough of Saint Ives (Hunts) Order 1889 Provisional Order made in pursuance of Section 52 of the Local Government Act, 1888.	
Education Department Provisional Order Confirmation (London) Act 1889	52 & 53 Vict. c. clxxiii	12 August 1889
An Act to confirm a Provisional Order made by the Education Department under the Elementary Education Act, 1870, to enable the School Board for London to put in force the Lands Clauses Consolidation Act, 1845, and the Acts amending the same.
	London Order 1889 The School Board for London. Provisional Order for putting in force the Lands Clauses Consolidation Act, 1845.	
Electric Lighting Orders Confirmation Act 1889	52 & 53 Vict. c. clxxiv	12 August 1889
An Act to confirm certain Provisional Orders made by the Board of Trade under the Electric Lighting Acts, 1882 (Note: Electric Lighting Act 1882 (45 & 46 Vict. c. 56)) and 1888, (Note: Electric Lighting Act 1888 (51 & 52 Vict. c. 12)) relating to Birmingham, Liverpool, and Swansea.
	Birmingham Electric Light and Power Order 1889 Provisional Order under the Electric Lighting Acts 1882 and 1888 granted by the Board of Trade to Arthur Chamberlain and George Hookham.	
	Liverpool Electric Lighting Order 1889 Provisional Order under the Electric Lighting Acts 1882 and 1888, granted by the Board of Trade to the Liverpool Electric Supply Company Limited.	
	Swansea Electric Lighting Order 1889 Provisional Order under the Electric Lighting Acts 1882 and 1888 granted by the Board of Trade to the Mayor Aldermen and Burgesses of the Borough of Swansea in the County of Glamorgan.	
Linlithgow Water Supply Confirmation Act 1889	52 & 53 Vict. c. clxxv	26 August 1889
An Act to confirm a Provisional Order under the Public Health (Scotland) Act, 1867, and Acts amending the same, relating to Linlithgow Water.
	Linlithgow Water Order 1889 Linlithgow Water. (Public Health (Scotland) Act, 1867, and Acts amending the same.) Provisional Order.	
Local Government Board (Ireland) Provisional Order Confirmation (Listowel Waterworks) Act 1889	52 & 53 Vict. c. clxxvi	26 August 1889
An Act to confirm a Provisional Order of the Local Government Board for Ireland relating to Listowel Waterworks.
	Listowel Waterworks Provisional Order 1889 Listowel Waterworks. The Local Government Board for Ireland. Provisional Order.	
Local Government Board's Provisional Order Confirmation (No. 2) Act 1889 (repealed)	52 & 53 Vict. c. clxxvii	26 August 1889
An Act to confirm a Provisional Order of the Local Government Board relating to the Isle of Wight. (Repealed by Isle of Wight Act 1980 (c. xv))
	Isle of Wight (County) Order 1889 Provisional Order made in pursuance of Section 12 and 54 of the Local Government Act, 1888.	
Electric Lighting Orders Confirmation (No. 2) Act 1889	52 & 53 Vict. c. clxxviii	26 August 1889
An Act to confirm certain Provisional Orders made by the Board of Trade under the Electric Lighting Acts, 1882 and 1888, relating to Chelsea, &c., and St. George's, Hanover Square, &c.
	London Electric Supply Corporation Electric Lighting Order 1889 Provisional Order under the Electric Lighting Acts, 1882 and 1888, granted by the Board of Trade to the London Electric Supply Corporation Limited.	
	Westminster Electric Lighting Order 1889 Provisional Order under the Electric Lighting Acts, 1882 and 1888, granted by the Board of Trade to the Westminster Electric Supply Corporation, Limited.	
Electric Lighting Orders Confirmation (No. 3) Act 1889	52 & 53 Vict. c. clxxix	26 August 1889
An Act to confirm certain Provisional Orders made by the Board of Trade under the Electric Lighting Acts 1882, and 1888, relating to various portions of the Parish of Kensington St. Mary Abbot and a portion of the Parish of St. Margaret, Westminster.
	House-to-House Electric Light Supply Order 1889 Provisional Order under the Electric Lighting Acts, 1882 and 1888, granted by the Board of Trade to the House-to-House Electric Light Supply Company, Limited.	
	South Kensington Electric Lighting Order 1889 Provisional Order under the Electric Lighting Acts, 1882 and 1888, granted by the Board of Trade to the Kensington and Knightsbridge Electric Lighting Company, Limited.	
Electric Lighting Order Confirmation (No. 4) Act 1889	52 & 53 Vict. c. clxxx	26 August 1889
An Act to confirm a Provisional Order made by the Board of Trade under the Electric Lighting Acts, 1882 and 1888, relating to St. Martin-in-the-Fields.
	St. Martin Electric Lighting Order 1889 Provisional Order under the Electric Lighting Acts, 1882 and 1888, granted by the Board of Trade to the Electricity Supply Corporation, Limited.	
Electric Lighting Orders Confirmation (No. 5) Act 1889	52 & 53 Vict. c. clxxxi	26 August 1889
An Act to confirm certain Provisional Orders made by the Board of Trade under the Electric Lighting Acts, 1882 and 1888, relating to Saint Giles, &c., and Marylebone.
	Metropolitan Electric Supply Company (Mid London) Lighting Order 1889 Provisional Order under the Electric Lighting Acts, 1882 and 1888, granted by the Board of Trade to the Metropolitan Electric Supply Company, Limited.	
	Metropolitan Electric Supply Company (West London) Lighting Order 1889 Provisional Order under the Electric Lighting Acts, 1882 and 1888, granted by the Board of Trade to the Metropolitan Electric Supply Company, Limited.	
Bury Corporation Waterworks Act 1889	52 & 53 Vict. c. clxxxii	26 August 1889
An Act to authorise the Corporation of Bury to make additional Waterworks, and for other purposes.
Manchester, Middleton, and District Tramways Act 1889	52 & 53 Vict. c. clxxxiii	26 August 1889
An Act to extend the time for completing the Manchester Middleton and District Tramways.
Cheltenham Improvement Act 1889	52 & 53 Vict. c. clxxxiv	26 August 1889
An Act to make further and better provision for the improvement health and good government of the borough of Cheltenham to provide for the issue of Corporation Stock and for other purposes.
Freshwater, Yarmouth, and Newport Railway Act 1889	52 & 53 Vict. c. clxxxv	26 August 1889
An Act to confer further powers upon the Freshwater Yarmouth and Newport Railway Company and for other purposes.
Garw Water Act 1889	52 & 53 Vict. c. clxxxvi	26 August 1889
An Act to incorporate the Garw Water Company to enable them to acquire the Water Undertaking of the Garw Water and Light Company Limited in the County of Glamorgan and to construct Waterworks and for other purposes.
Norwich Corporation Act 1889	52 & 53 Vict. c. clxxxvii	26 August 1889
An Act to authorise the Construction of new Sewers to make better provision in relation to the Health Local Government and Improvement of the City of Norwich; and to provide for the creation and issue of Corporation Stock and for other purposes
Vale of Glamorgan Railway Act 1889	52 & 53 Vict. c. clxxxviii	26 August 1889
An Act to incorporate a company for the construction of railways in the Vale of Glamorgan; and for other purposes.
Barry and Cadoxton Gas and Water Act 1889	52 & 53 Vict. c. clxxxix	26 August 1889
An Act for conferring further powers on the Barry and Cadoxton Gas and Water Company.
Sheffield and South Yorkshire Navigation Act 1889	52 & 53 Vict. c. cxc	26 August 1889
An Act to provide for an Improved Water Communication between Sheffield Rotherham Doncaster the South Yorkshire Coalfields and the Sea; and for other purposes.
South Staffordshire Tramways Act 1889	52 & 53 Vict. c. cxci	26 August 1889
An Act to incorporate the South Staffordshire Tramways Company; and for other purposes.
Sutton Harbour Act 1889	52 & 53 Vict. c. cxcii	26 August 1889
An Act to authorise the Sutton Harbour Improvement Company to construct a Quay and Roadway and to establish and regulate a Fish-Market in connexion with their existing undertaking at the Harbour of Sutton Pool in the port of Plymouth and county of Devon; to facilitate the acquisition of lands from the Duchy of Cornwall; to revise and modernise the rates tolls and charges authorised to be taken by the Company; to confer upon them additional money powers; and for other purposes.
Taff Vale Railway (Amalgamation and Capital) Act 1889	52 & 53 Vict. c. cxciii	26 August 1889
An Act for amalgamating with the Undertaking of the Taff Vale Railway Company the Undertakings of other companies leased to or worked by them; and for consolidating and re-arranging the Capital of the said Company; and for other purposes.
Mumbles Railway and Pier Act 1889	52 & 53 Vict. c. cxciv	26 August 1889
An Act for making a Railway from the Oystermouth Railway or Tramroad to the Mumbles Head, with a Pier in connexion therewith, and for other purposes.
Golden Valley Extension Railway Act 1889	52 & 53 Vict. c. cxcv	26 August 1889
An Act to enable the Golden Valley Railway Company to make New Railways and for other purposes.
Metropolitan Electric Lighting Act 1889	52 & 53 Vict. c. cxcvi	26 August 1889
An Act for authorising the Metropolitan Electric Supply Company Limited to erect and maintain Electric Lines and Works and to supply Electrical Energy within the Parish of Saint Martin-in-the-Fields in the County of Middlesex and certain other parts of the Metropolis; and for other purposes.
Painswick Railway Act 1889	52 & 53 Vict. c. cxcvii	26 August 1889
An Act for making a Railway from Stroud to Painswick to be called "the Painswick Railway" and for other purposes.
South Hampshire Railway and Pier Act 1889	52 & 53 Vict. c. cxcviii	26 August 1889
An Act to confer further powers on the South Hampshire Railway and Pier Company and for other purposes.
Swansea Corporation Act 1889	52 & 53 Vict. c. cxcix	26 August 1889
An Act to extend the boundaries of the borough of Swansea to extend the time for the construction of certain waterworks to make and maintain a street improvement and to make better provision for the health local government and improvement of the borough and for other purposes.
Wigan Corporation Act 1889	52 & 53 Vict. c. cc	26 August 1889
An Act to make better provision for the health local government and improvement of the Borough of Wigan and to provide for the creation and issue of Corporation Stock and for other purposes.
Towcester and Buckingham Railway Act 1889 (repealed)	52 & 53 Vict. c. cci	26 August 1889
An Act for incorporating the Towcester and Buckingham Railway Company and authorising the construction of various railways and works in the counties of Buckingham and Northampton and for other purposes. (Repealed by Towcester and Buckingham Railway (Abandonment) Act 1893 (56 & 57 Vict. c. cciii))
West Metropolitan Tramways Act 1889	52 & 53 Vict. c. ccii	26 August 1889
An Act to empower the West Metropolitan Tramways Company to construct additional Tramways and for other purposes.
Stoke-upon-Trent Rectory Act 1889	52 & 53 Vict. c. cciii	26 August 1889
An Act to authorise the purchase out of funds in Court, and the annexation to the See of Lichfield, of the Advowson of the Rectory of Stoke-upon-Trent, in the County of Stafford, and the better disposal of the Endowments of the Rectory, and other arrangements connected therewith.
Brean Down Harbour and Railway Act 1889	52 & 53 Vict. c. cciv	26 August 1889
An Act for making a Pier and Harbour at Brean Down on the Bristol Channel and a Railway to connect the same with the Great Western Railway; and for other purposes.
River Suck Drainage Act 1889	52 & 53 Vict. c. ccv	26 August 1889
An Act for extending the time for the completion of the works by a Provisional Order made in pursuance of the Drainage and Improvement of Lands Act (Ireland) 1863 and the Acts amending the same and confirmed by the Drainage and Improvement of Lands Supplemental Act (Ireland) 1878 (Note: Drainage and Improvement of Lands Supplemental Act (Ireland) 1878 (41 & 42 Vict. c. xxxviii)) authorised to be executed within the River Suck Drainage District constituted by such Order and for other purposes.
Croydon Tramways Act 1889	52 & 53 Vict. c. ccvi	26 August 1889
An Act to incorporate the Croydon Tramways Company and for other purposes.
Plymouth Tramways Act 1889 (repealed)	52 & 53 Vict. c. ccvii	26 August 1889
An Act to incorporate the Plymouth Tramways Company and to authorise the construction of certain Tramways in the Borough of Plymouth, in the County of Devon, and for other purposes. (Repealed by Plymouth Corporation Act 1915 (5 & 6 Geo. 5. c. lxix))
Belgrano (Buenos Aires) Gas Company Act 1889	52 & 53 Vict. c. ccviii	26 August 1889
An Act to extend and vary the Powers of the Belgrano (Buenos Ayres) Gas Company Limited.
Post Office (Sites) Act 1889 (repealed)	52 & 53 Vict. c. ccix	30 August 1889
An Act to authorise the transfer of the Site of the Coldbath Fields Prison, in the County of Middlesex, to Her Majesty's Postmaster-General, and for other purposes. (Repealed by Postal Services Act 2000 (Consequential Modifications to Local Enactments) Order 2003 (SI 2003/1542))
Filey Pier and Tramroad Act 1889	52 & 53 Vict. c. ccx	30 August 1889
An Act for making a Pier at Filey in the County of York with a Tramroad in connexion therewith; and for other purposes.
Terrington and Walpole Tramroads Act 1889	52 & 53 Vict. c. ccxi	30 August 1889
An Act for incorporating the Terrington and Walpole Tramroad Company and empowering them to construct Tramroads in the County of Norfolk and for other purposes.
Wellingborough and District Tramroads Act 1889	52 & 53 Vict. c. ccxii	30 August 1889
An Act for incorporating the Wellingborough and District Tramroads Company and empowering them to construct Tramroads; and for other purposes.
Beverley and East Riding Railway Act 1889 (repealed)	52 & 53 Vict. c. ccxiii	30 August 1889
An Act for authorising the Construction of Railways in the East Riding of the County of York to be called the Beverley and East Riding Railway and for other purposes. (Repealed by Beverley and East Riding Railway (Abandonment) Act 1891 (54 & 55 Vict. c. cxxxiii))
Rossendale Valley Tramways (Burnley Extension) Act 1889	52 & 53 Vict. c. ccxiv	30 August 1889
An Act for empowering the Rossendale Valley Tramways Company to construct new Tramways, and for other purposes.

=== Private and personal acts ===
Short title	Citation	Royal assent
Long title
Basset Estate Act 1889	52 & 53 Vict. c. 1 Pr.	12 August 1889
An Act to enable Reductions to be made in the Dues payable under certain Mineral Leases of parts of the Estates in the county of Cornwall settled by the late Frances Baroness Basset and John Francis Basset and to authorise the Purchase by the Trustees of the Settlement of Furniture Farming Stock Harbour Plant and Effects of the late Gustavus Lambart Basset; and for other purposes connected with the Settled Estate.
Henry Crawshay's Estate Act 1889	52 & 53 Vict. c. 2 Pr.	12 August 1889
An Act for sanctioning Arrangements for the Sale to a proposed Limited Company (Note: Henry Crawshay & Company Ltd) of the Businesses and Property of "Henry Crawshay and Sons" and "Henry Crawshay and Company" and other property and for enabling Executors and Trustees interested therein to concur and to accept and hold Debentures Stocks and Shares in the proposed Limited Company; and for other purposes.
Stobcross Estate Act 1889	52 & 53 Vict. c. 3 Pr.	12 August 1889
An Act to confer the powers on the Trustees of the late John Ross junior Andrew Galbraith and John Thompson respectively in relation to their respective interests in the Lands of Stobcross and other lands and property in the Barony Parish of Glasgow and County of Lanark.
St. Maur Heirlooms (Pictures) Act 1889	52 & 53 Vict. c. 4 Pr.	12 August 1889
An Act to authorize the sale of the Pictures bequeathed by the Will of the late Edward Adolphus twelfth Duke of Somerset deceased as heirlooms and to declare the trusts of the proceeds of such sale and for other purposes.
Ashburner Estate Act 1889	52 & 53 Vict. c. 5 Pr.	23 August 1889
An Act for sanctioning and confirming a Deed of Arrangement ascertaining and determining the Estates Rights and Interests of the several persons interested in the residuary Real and Personal Estate of George Ashburner Esquire deceased and for other purposes.
Schlesinger's Naturalization Act 1889 (Note: This act was not printed by the Queen's Printer.)	52 & 53 Vict. c. 6 Pr.	26 August 1889
An Act to Naturalise Caesar Schlesinger, and to grant to and confer upon him all the Rights, Privileges, and Capacities of a Natural-born Subject of Her Majesty the Queen.

=== Sources ===
- The Public General Statutes, Volume 26: 52 & 53 Victoria – 1889. Law reports. Printed by George Edward Eyre and William Spottiswoode – via HathiTrust.
- Public General Statutes – via Google Books.
- Local and Personal Acts – via Google Books.

== See also ==
- List of acts of the Parliament of the United Kingdom
