= Prevention of Cruelty to Children Act 1894 =

Act of the Parliament of the United Kingdom

Prevention of Cruelty to Children Act 1894 (Note: Section 28(1).)
- Act of Parliament
- Parliament of the United Kingdom
- Long title: An Act to consolidate the Acts relating to the Prevention of Cruelty to, and Protection of, Children.
- Citation: 57 & 58 Vict. c. 41
- Territorial extent: United Kingdom

Dates
- Royal assent: 17 August 1894
- Commencement: 21 August 1894 (Note: Section 28(3).)
- Repealed: 1 October 1904
Other legislation
| Amends | See § Repealed enactments |
| Repeals/revokes | See § Repealed enactments |
| Repealed by | Prevention of Cruelty to Children Act 1904 |

Status: Repealed

Text of statute as originally enacted

The Prevention of Cruelty to Children Act 1894 (57 & 58 Vict. c. 41) was an act of the Parliament of the United Kingdom that consolidated enactments related to the prevention of cruelty to, and protection of, children in the United Kingdom.

== Provisions ==
=== Repealed enactments ===
Section 28(2) of the act repealed 2 enactments, listed in that section.

| Citation | Short title | Extent of repeal |
|---|---|---|
| 52 & 53 Vict. c. 44 | Prevention of Cruelty to, and Protection of, Children Act 1889 | The whole act. |
| 57 & 58 Vict. c. 27 | Prevention of Cruelty to Children (Amendment) Act 1894 | The whole act. |

== Subsequent developments ==
The whole act was repealed by section 33(2) of, and the second schedule to, the Prevention of Cruelty to Children Act 1904 (4 Edw. 7. c. 15), which came into force on 1 October 1904.
