= Prevention of Cruelty to, and Protection of, Children Act 1889 =

Act of the Parliament of the United Kingdom

Prevention of Cruelty to, and Protection of, Children Act 1889 (Note: Section 19.)
- Act of Parliament
- Parliament of the United Kingdom
- Long title: An Act for the Prevention of Cruelty to, and better Protection of, Children.
- Citation: 52 & 53 Vict. c. 44
- Territorial extent: England and Wales; Scotland (except sections 8 and 11); Ireland; (Note: Section 16.)

Dates
- Royal assent: 26 August 1889
- Commencement: 26 August 1889 (Note: The Acts of Parliament (Commencement) Act 1793.)
- Repealed: 21 August 1894
Other legislation
| Amends | Poor Law Amendment Act 1868 |
| Amended by | Prevention of Cruelty to Children (Amendment) Act 1894 |
| Repealed by | Prevention of Cruelty to Children Act 1894 |

Status: Repealed

Text of statute as originally enacted

The Prevention of Cruelty to, and Protection of, Children Act 1889 (52 & 53 Vict. c. 44), commonly known as the Children's Charter, was an act of the Parliament of the United Kingdom.

It was the first act of Parliament for the prevention of cruelty to children. It enabled the state to intervene, for the first time, in relations between parents and children. Police could arrest or investigate anyone found ill-treating a child, and enter a home if a child was thought to be in danger. The act included guidelines on the child labor laws and outlawed begging.

== Subsequent developments ==
The whole act was repealed by section 28(2) of the Prevention of Cruelty to Children Act 1894 (57 & 58 Vict. c. 41), which came into force on 21 August 1894.
