= George Stringer Bull =

Church of England clergyman and social reformer

George Stringer Bull (1799–1865) was an English missionary and cleric, a social and industrial reformer in the Bradford area.

== Early life ==
He was the sixth son of the Rev. John Bull (1767–1834) and his wife Margaret Towndrow, born at Stanway in Essex. Having served in the Royal Navy, he went for the Church Missionary Society to Sierra Leone in 1818, working there as a teacher. He was principal of the Christian Institution of Sierra Leone of the Society, near Freetown. Sir Charles MacCarthy had recently required that it act as a College. Bull had around 20 African students there. The College migrated in 1820, from Leicester Mountain to Regent's Town.

Bull returned to England in 1820 for health reasons. As a convalescent, to prepare for the ministry, he first read with his father, a classical scholar. He then studied in 1822 with Robert Francis Walker at Purleigh. After that he was with his uncle, Henry Towndrow Bull, remaining in Essex at Littlebury. He was ordained deacon in the Church of England in 1823 by George Henry Law, taking a position at Hessle in the East Riding of Yorkshire. The following year he was ordained priest, by Edward Venables-Vernon-Harcourt. In 1825 he became curate at Hanging Heaton; and in 1826 he took the position of perpetual curate at Bierley Chapel, then just outside Bradford.

== At Bradford ==
Bull was an abolitionist and temperance campaigner. He also became involved with factory reform movement of the 1830s, as an ally of John Wood. He pursued the vigorous and attention-seeking tactics of Richard Oastler and the Member of Parliament Michael Thomas Sadler, becoming noted as the "Ten Hours Parson". Sadler lost his seat in parliament in 1832, and Bull wished the legislative campaign to continue.

It was Bull that contacted Lord Ashley in 1833 about parliamentary moves for industrial legislation. That came about after the first Factory Movement conference, in Bradford during January 1833, where Bull was chosen as delegate to go to London. The suggestion of Ashley came from Sir Andrew Agnew, 7th Baronet. Meeting Ashley – later the 7th Earl of Shaftesbury – in February, Bull pressed him to propose a ten-hours bill rapidly, since otherwise Lord Morpeth would propose a pre-emptive eleven-hours bill. Ashley's bill failed, and the Ten Hours Act would take another 14 years.

The impatient Oastler suggested machine-breaking to a Bradford meeting, after another reverse, in 1836, with Charles Hindley unable to revive the bill. Bull strongly disapproved, and Ashley broke off relations with Oastler.

Bull was a vociferous opponent of the Poor Law Amendment Act 1834. In testimony to parliament, he stated that birth control was prevalent in female factory workers; he put it down to the influence of a visit by Richard Carlile. As a clerical social critic, he has been classed with Patrick Brewster, William Hill (1806–1867) the Swedenborgian editor of the Northern Star, and Rayner Stephens. A Tory reformer, Bull also opposed the Chartists. He was one of a group of local clergy and laymen who attended an Owenite meeting in Bradford in November 1839, deploring its irreligion. While Bull and other Factor Movement leaders saw that Robert Owen was on their side of the argument, they regarded his approach as impractical.

At Bierley Chapel, Bull persuaded Frances Currer, the patron, to build a house. He set up two local schools, one in Bowling township, and one in Sticken Lane; and he expanded the chapel seating. Wood, who had financed the Bowling school, brought Bull into his new Bradford church, St James's. But the arrival in 1838 as vicar of Bradford of William Scoresby led to serious tensions, and Wood in end closed the church. The bone of contention between Wood and Scoresby was surplice fees. Bull departed in September 1840. The Bowling school, for Wood's factory, ran from 1832 to c.1846 superintended by Matthew Balme, and was visited by Lord Ashley in 1844; and the Sticken Lane school was still running in the 1850s.

== Later life ==
Bull moved to the Birmingham area, and was appointed to the new St Matthew's Church, Duddeston and Nechells as perpetual curate. In 1847 he became rector of St Thomas' Church, Birmingham, with its populous parish.

In poor health, Bull in 1864 was posted to Almeley in Herefordshire. He died there on 20 August 1865.

== Works ==
- A Respectful and Faithful Appeal to the Inhabitants of the Parish of Bradford on behalf of the Factory Children (1832)
- The Church her Own Enemy (1834)
- "Home," and how to make it happy: a lecture (1854)
- Richard Oastler: A Sermon preached in St. James Church, Bradford (1861)
