= John Wood (Bradford manufacturer) =

English industrialist and factory reformer (1793–1871)

John Wood (1793–1871) was an English manufacturer in Bradford, a leading spinner of worsted. He is now remembered as a factory reformer associated with Richard Oastler, who campaigned for employment standards.

== Early life ==
The son of John Wood senior (died 1832), a manufacturer in Bradford's Ivegate, he was apprenticed at age 15 to Richard Smith, a local worsted spinner. His father extended his premises, in which tortoiseshell was worked, with a steam-powered mill, where in 1815 John Wood junior went into business for himself as a spinner.

Wood expanded and by 1828 employed 500 people. In 1830, a widower living at Horton Hall, he was visited by Richard Oastler, and persuaded him to look into "factory reform".

== Campaigner ==
There had been a major strike by wool-combers and weavers in Bradford in 1825, a year of financial panic. Wood had been involved in mediation. It ended in defeat for attempts to unionise. Wood's outstanding concern was with issues raised by child labour. He had in 1825 asked employers to shorten the working day, without success. Naturally shy, he canvassed and attended rallies as well as financing Michael Thomas Sadler, a radical Tory Member of Parliament who backed a Ten Hours Bill.

At a personal level, Wood set standards at his own mill, where the working day was of 11 hours, though he was unable to stop the corporal punishment there of child workers. The prevailing hours in the Bradford worsted industry were 6 a.m. to 7 p.m., with a 30-minute break for lunch: Wood was credited with being the first employer to allow time for breakfast.

In 1831 Wood recruited to the cause George Stringer Bull, a curate at Bierley Chapel (in what is now the City of Bradford) who went on to lobby Lord Ashley, a key figure in factory act legislation put to the House of Commons. At Bowling, then a township just outside Bradford, Wood set up a factory school, with teacher Matthew Balme. Balme was a protégé of Bull, who taught at Bowling for 14 years, and like Bull was a stalwart of the Ten Hours agitation. He later was an associate in the factory reform movement of "Squire" Auty and William Edward Forster.

Wood was uncomfortable with the provocations employed tactically by Oastler and Sadler. He did participate fully when Sadler made a northern tour in 1832. St James's Church at Bowling was built with the school there, at Wood's expense. He appointed Bull to it, but later clashed over his choice with William Scoresby, vicar of Bradford from 1838. In the end he closed the church.

== Later life ==
Two years of agitation for industrial reform, with Oastler and Sadler, left Wood discouraged. His father died in 1832, leaving him a fortune of £500,000, and he married again in 1833. By 1834–5 he had sold Horton Hall, his residence near Bradford, to the lawyer Samuel Hailstone.

In 1835 Wood brought in William Walker as a business partner, and began to withdraw from the worsted trade. With the purchase of property near Alton, Hampshire he retained philanthropic interests, but exchanged activism for the life of a gentleman, settling at Thedden Grange. He died there on 28 February 1871, and was buried in the church at Shalden.

== Family ==
Wood married for the first time around 1815, and lived with his wife, who died in 1826, at Southbrook Lodge, his father's house in Little Horton, now part of the Bradford metropolitan area. There were no children of the marriage.

In 1833, Wood married again, to Annis Elisabeth Hardy, daughter of John Hardy. They had three sons and three daughters, the eldest son being John Gathorne Wood (born 1839). He married firstly Susan Mary Pennefather (died 1864), daughter of Edward Pennefather; and secondly Mary Anne Hewitt (died 1913), daughter of James Hewitt, 4th Viscount Lifford. His brothers were Charles Frederic Wood, married 1877 Edith L. W. Tayler, and Arthur Hardy Wood, married 1871 Annis Matilda Hardy.
