= Frances Mary Richardson Currer =

British heiress (1785 - 1861)

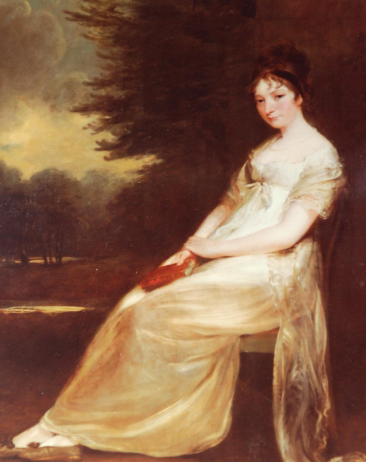
- 1807 painting by John James Masquerier
- Born: 3 March 1785; Eshton, Skipton, Yorkshire, England
- Died: 28 April 1861 (aged 76); Eshton, Skipton, Yorkshire, England
- Known for: collecting books

Frances Mary Richardson Currer (3 March 1785 – 28 April 1861) was a British heiress and book collector.

== Life ==
Frances Mary Richardson Currer was born shortly after the death of her father, Henry Richardson Currer in 1785. Shortly before he died, he had added the surname Currer to his own name. This was a condition of a substantial inheritance from Sarah Currer, the grand daughter of Matthew Wilson who had built Eshton Hall. Frances received a further inheritance which included the library of Richard Richardson, her great-grandfather.

The Bierley estate she had inherited was the site of mining operations under a lease for mineral rights, for 46 years, granted by Currer in 1800, to Henry Leah.

Currer had problems with her hearing throughout her life and she died at Eshton Hall in 1861.

== Bibliophile ==
Frances Currer had always had an interest in books. In 1820 she had a catalogue prepared and privately printed and in 1833 she had Thomas Hartwell Horne prepare a second edition which was printed to reflect further changes.

Thomas Frognall Dibdin wrote in 1838 that her library was one of the best in the country. Althorpe, Chatsworth and Stowe were the only libraries he thought more extensive. Dibdin is quoted as calling her the "head of all female book collectors in Europe." He estimated that the library contained 20,000 books, but Currer was one of his patrons. Dibdin also spoke well of the book collections of Richard Heber which were larger than Currer's. Heber and Currer had a close relationship and Heber was bailed out by Currer when he had financial difficulties.

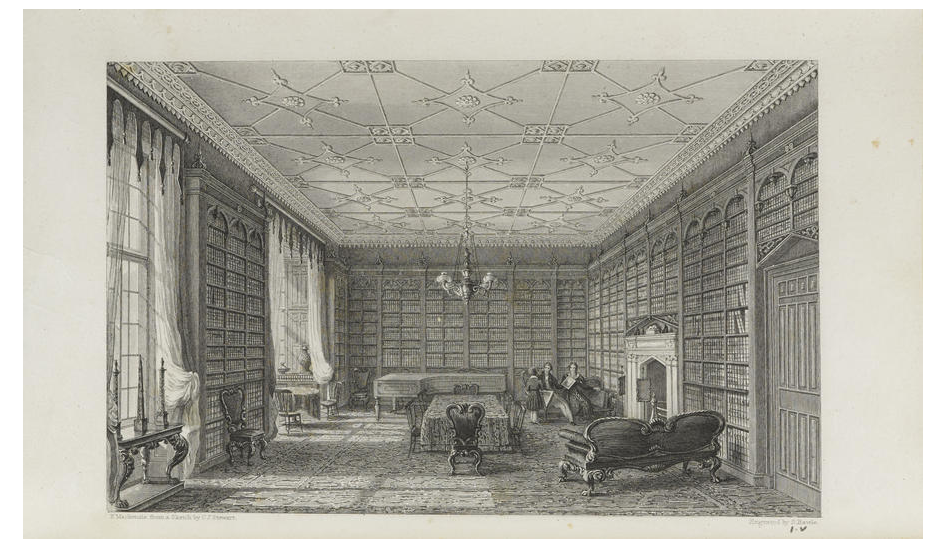
Eshton Hall Library

== Benefactor ==
Frances Currer gave money to the North Bierley chapel. Its foundation dated back to Richard Richardson (1708–1781), son of Dr. Richard Richardson, and it had been licensed in 1766. It was only in her time, however, that it was consecrated, in 1824, and she became its patron. It was enlarged at her expense in the following years, and became a chapel of ease. She put up a vicarage there in 1827, for George Stringer Bull.

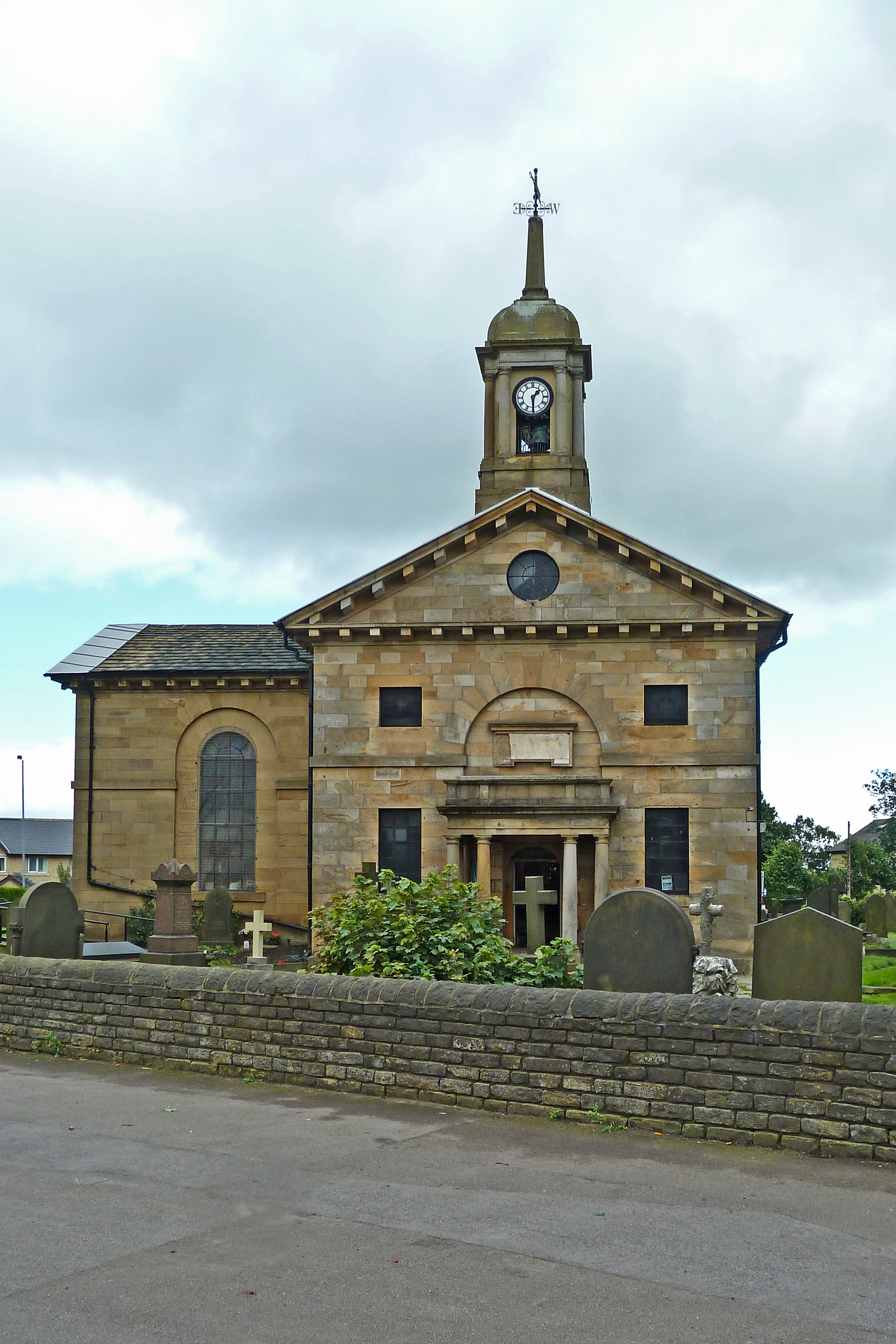
St John the Evangelist church, the former Bierley chapel, today

It is thought that Currer gave Patrick Brontë of Haworth £50 when he became a widower in 1821. Currer donated money to the Clergy Daughter's School in Lancashire that the Brontë sisters attended in 1824–5, and funded the local mechanics institute. It has been speculated that her philanthropy was the reason that Charlotte Brontë chose the nom de plume of "Currer Bell" for her 1847 novel Jane Eyre.

A figure connecting Bierley and Haworth was James Bardsley. Patrick Brontë hoped in 1833 to have him as curate, but the permission of Edward Venables-Vernon-Harcourt, the Archbishop of York, was refused. He became curate at the Bierley chapel.
