= James Stillingfleet (priest, born 1741) =

English evangelical cleric

James Stillingfleet (1741–1826) was an English evangelical cleric, vicar of Hotham in Yorkshire from 1771 until his death.

== Early life ==
Born into a clerical family, he was the son of the Rev. Edward Stillingfleet (died 1777), vicar of Wolverley and later of Hartlebury, and his wife Elizabeth Jackson. He matriculated at Queen's College, Oxford in 1759. His older first cousin James Stillingfleet (1729–1817), also a grandson of Dean James Stillingfleet (1674–1729), was at that time in Oxford as an academic.

The elder James Stillingfleet, a Fellow of Merton College until 1767, was prominent in Oxford as a leading evangelical: he led Methodist prayer meetings, associated with Richard Hill and was a contact of John Newton who mentioned him to Alexander Clunie in 1766. James Stillingfleet the younger, of Queen's, graduated B.A. in 1762, and M.A. in 1765. He found his way to an evangelical position on justification by grace, initially by reading William Law. He was ordained deacon in 1764, and priest in 1766, by James Johnson, Bishop of Worcester.

== In Yorkshire ==
Stillingfleet took up in 1766 the position of chaplain to Richard Richardson of Bierley Hall. Bierley Chapel was constructed at this time. His patron, Richard Richardson the younger (1708–1781), son of the physician Richard Richardson (1663–1741), had building work carried out on Bierley Hall, and a chapel added on his North Bierley estate. Preaching at a place in Bowling lying now within the City of Bradford, Stillingfleet attracted an audience from Bradford itself. With the foundation of the Elland Clerical Society in 1767, a Yorkshire evangelical network began to take shape.

In 1771 Stillingfleet became a parish priest, at Hotham, south of the market town Market Weighton in the East Riding. At a later point, he set up the Hotham Society, to emulate the Elland Society in the West Riding founded by Henry Venn at Huddersfield, which from 1777 was in a position to fund an Oxbridge education for potential ordinands.

Stillingfleet became a close friend of Joseph Milner, who taught at Hull Grammar School from 1767, and was curate at North Ferriby from 1768. A third in the group of close friends was William Richardson of York (1745–1821): he was a pupil at St Bees School of John James (1729–1785), ordained in 1768 by Robert Hay Drummond to a curacy at Kirbymoorside. Milner's The History of the Church of Christ became a standard work and was a product of the early years of the 1770s when he had become a convinced evangelical and lost friends in Hull. Much of it was written at Stillingfleet's rectory.

The evangelical clerical societies of the later 18th centuries worked to provide graduate priests. Robert Wasney (1772/3–1836) was a product of this Yorkshire milieu. He was a pupil of Milner at Hull Grammar School, and went on to Clare College, Cambridge in 1791, associating with followers of Charles Simeon, and graduating B.A. in 1795. He was ordained priest in 1796, to Waghen, but soon went as curate to Stillingfleet at Hotham. He was much impressed by the trio, with Robinson. He moved to St Thomas's Chapel, Newcastle upon Tyne.

Stillingfleet in 1775 built a house, Hotham Villa, near the existing rectory which was a cottage; from 1870 to the 1950s it was used as the rectory. In 1797, he won a Gold Medal of the Society of Arts for the cultivation of rhubarb. He died on 19 December 1826 at age 85, and was buried in the parish church on 27 December.

== Works ==
Thomas Adam, parish priest at Wintringham for half a century, ran a "Parson's Club" and associated with Stillingfleet and his friends. His Posthumous Works (1786) were edited by the Hotham Society group of Stillingfleet, Joseph Milner and William Richardson of York, with Stillingfleet providing the biographical introduction signed "J.S".

A slim volume of diary entries from these Works, entitled Private Thoughts on Religion, became a religious classic. It was in demand from Anglican evangelicals, and was reprinted through the 19th century in the UK and USA. Through the work, Thomas Adam was known in the family of Jacques Reclus. In 1848 Edward Bickersteth combined "Thoughts on Religion" from the Pensées with Private Thoughts, which was organised in a similar way. John Henry Overton, writing in 1881, called Private Thoughts a "once popular devotional book", but also "of no small merit", characterising Stillingfleet as Adam's "pious and accomplished biographer" who revived interest in William Law.

Stillingfleet himself published:

- A Sermon Preached at the Opening of the General Infirmary at Hull, on Wednesday the First of September, 1784.
- A Short and Familiar Explanation of the Church-Catechism (1787)

He edited:

- Sermons on important subjects : selected from the papers of the Rev. John King, B. A. Late Vicar of Middleton, near Pickering, and Minister of St. Mary's, Hull (1782), with a funeral sermon.

== Family ==
In 1774, Stillingfleet married Elizabeth Taylor, daughter of William Taylor (died 1752) of Great Hadham, and the sister of William Taylor How of Stondon Place in Essex. William Taylor How was a friend of Thomas Gray, a graduate and Fellow of Pembroke College, Cambridge, and died in 1777. Stondon Place, and the requirement to change his surname, came from a distant relation, John How (died 1748). Elizabeth was co-heiress, but the house went to her sisters Jane (died 1793) and Ann.

Edward William Stillingfleet, who was curate of Hotham from 1814 to 1844, was James's son.
