= Factories Act 1847 =

Act of the Parliament of the United Kingdom

- Act of Parliament
- Parliament of the United Kingdom
- Long title: An Act to limit the Hours of Labour of young Persons and Females in Factories.
- Citation: 10 & 11 Vict. c. 29
- Territorial extent: United Kingdom

Dates
- Royal assent: 8 June 1847
- Commencement: 1 July 1847 (Note: Section 1.)
- Repealed: 1 January 1875
Other legislation
Amends	Labour of Children, etc., in Factories Act 1833; Factories Act 1844
Amended by	Factories Act 1850; Bleaching and Dyeing Works Act 1860; Lace Factory Act 1861
Repealed by	Factory Act 1874

Status: Repealed

Text of statute as originally enacted

The Factories Act 1847 (10 & 11 Vict. c. 29), also known as the Ten Hours Act, was an act of the Parliament of the United Kingdom which restricted the working hours of women and young persons (13–18) in textile mills to 10 hours per day. The practicalities of running a textile mill were such that the act should have effectively set the same limit on the working hours of adult male mill-workers.

Defective drafting meant that a subsequent Factory Act in 1850 imposing tighter restrictions on the hours within which women and young persons could work was needed to bring this about. The 1847 act was the culmination of a campaign lasting almost fifteen years to bring in a 'Ten Hours Bill'; a great Radical cause of the period. Prominent advocates and people involved with the act include Richard Oastler, Lord Ashley (he was not an MP in the session when the act was passed), John Doherty and sympathetic mill-owners such as John Fielden. The fiercest opponents of all ten-hour bills were the 'free trade' Liberals such as John Bright; the economic doctrines that led them to object to artificial tariff barriers also led them to object to government restricting the terms on which a man might sell his labour, and to extend that objection to women and young peoples. Karl Marx, speaking at the International Workingmen's Association meeting in November 1864 said of it "This struggle about the legal restriction of the hours of labour raged more fiercely since; apart from avarice, it told indeed upon the great contest between the blind rule of the supply and demand laws which form the political economy of the middle class, a social production subjected to a foreseeing social control which forms the political economy of the working class. Hence the Ten Hours’ Bill was not only a great practical success; it was the victory of a principle; it was the first time that in broad daylight the political economy of the middle class succumbed ignominiously, ludicrously, before the political economy of the working class".

== Provisions ==
The act stipulated that as of 1 July 1847, women and children between the ages of 13 and 18 could work only 63 hours per week. The Bill further stipulated that as of 1 May 1848, women and children 13–18 could work only 58 hours per week, the equivalent of 10 hours per day.

== Previous bills ==
=== Whig Bills ===
The Labour of Children, etc., in Factories Act 1833 (3 & 4 Will. 4. c. 103) had specified an eight-hour working day for children (aged nine to thirteen) and a twelve-hour day for 'young persons' (fourteen to eighteen) but it had proved difficult to enforce, and its attempts to ensure the education of mill-children had failed. Under the Whig government of Lord Melbourne, Fox Maule had repeatedly produced draft factory bills which were to replace the 1833 act and better address these issues, but the Whigs had never found the political will and the parliamentary time to get a new Factory Act passed. Maule's later draft bills had proposed reducing the working hours for children to allow better access to better education but had otherwise left hours of work unchanged. A short-time movement in the textile districts sought a ten-hour day for all millworkers, which it believed would be effectively secured by reducing the working hours for young persons: Lord Ashley supported their cause.

=== Conservatives come to power ===
The Whigs were defeated in the 1841 general election, and Sir Robert Peel formed a Conservative government. Ashley let it be known that he had declined office under Peel because Peel would not commit himself not to oppose a ten-hour bill; Ashley, therefore, wished to retain freedom of action on factory issues. In February 1842, Peel indicated definite opposition to a ten-hour bill, and Sir James Graham, Peel's Home Secretary, declared his intention to proceed with a bill prepared by Fox Maule, but with some alterations. In response to the findings of a royal commission, Ashley saw through Parliament the Mines and Collieries Act 1842 (5 & 6 Vict. c. 99) banning the employment of women and children underground; the measure was welcomed by both front benches, with Graham assuring Ashley "that her Majesty's Government would render him every assistance in carrying on the measure". In July, it was announced that the Government did not intend any modification to the Factory Act in that session.

==== The education issue ====
In 1843, Ashley initiated a debate on "the best means of diffusing the benefits and blessings of a moral and religious education among the working classes..." The Royal Commission had investigated not only the working hours and conditions of the children but also their moral state. It had found much of concern in their habits and language, but the greatest concern was that "the means of secular and religious instruction.. are so grievously defective, that, in all the districts, great numbers of Children and Young Persons are growing up without any religious, moral, or intellectual training; nothing being done to form them to habits of order, sobriety, honesty, and forethought, or even to restrain them from vice and crime." (Note: A member of the Commission separately suggested, in his capacity as Factory Inspector, that the Plug Plot Riots and other Chartist disturbances in Ashton-under-Lyne could have been averted had more attention been paid in the past to the education of the humbler classes of the district by their superiors). It is unclear how far this political aspect drove the education initiative. For the record, the Chartist Northern Star supported Graham's education clauses; education and intellectual culture were the means "by which the working man comes to know something of the framework of society, and to understand what his rights are, as a first step towards the assertion of them")

The State had no responsibility for the provision of education, and the working classes themselves had neither the capital nor the income to set up and support schools giving an effective education to their children. Through the Privy Council, government money (the Education Grant) was available to cover up to one-third (in principle; in hard cases up to a half) of the cost of setting up an 'efficient' school (one giving an effective education) where none existed. Since the repeal of the Test and Corporation Acts, many of the grievances of the Dissenters had been addressed, until the Whig government felt itself politically unable to go further because of the increasing concern (and resentment) of Anglicans at the systematic erosion of the Church of England's status as the national church (indeed Graham had left the Whig government to join the Conservatives because of his objections on this point). Church and organised Dissent regarded each other not as a colleague, but at best as a competitor, and too often as an opponent (and one which had been unduly favoured by the government). Consequently, two charities existed to assist the formation of efficient schools; the British and Foreign School Society for the Education of the Labouring and Manufacturing Classes of Society of Every Religious Persuasion was non-denominational (Note: up to a point: it had initially tried to teach the Bible, but not any doctrine to be derived from the Bible. Finding this impracticable it gave religious instruction inoffensive to any of the main (Protestant) denominations, being careful not to advance any view on matters where there were doctrinal differences between them. It was however definitely Trinitarian) and hence was favoured by Dissenters. Its implications for the Established Church were noted by an anonymous contemporary American commentator "Without swerving a hair's breadth from"( their declared principles) "they would by their mere negative influence, utterly subvert (and that at no distant day, if counteracting influences were not vigorously employed,) the church establishment, as such; and make Episcopacy in England what it is in this country, one of some dozen sects, all depending for their influence, and for the extent to which their doctrines and usages shall be received, upon the judgement, conscience, education, or caprice of their fellow men". Such an outcome would not be unwelcome to Dissenters; to avert it, churchmen had founded a rival organisation: the exclusively Anglican National Society for Promoting the Education of the Poor in the Principles of the Established Church in England and Wales. Its aim was that "the National Religion should be made the foundation of National Education and should be the first and chief thing taught to the poor, according to the excellent Liturgy and Catechism provided by our Church."

Since the Factory Act required factory children to attend school, the factory inspectorate had been drawn into taking a view on the quality of schooling the children were getting. The "British" and "National" schools they considered acceptable (Note: with caveats; some inspectors thought there was too much rote learning in National schools, others saw difficulties (if not a contradiction in terms) in "non-denominational" religious instruction (how could the instructor be categorical on some doctrinal points but evasive on others?) The hypothetical case where an instructor thought the views a pupil held imperilled his salvation had caused some difficulty to a British Society witness examined by a Royal Commission on education; it also caused many Anglican clergies to be lukewarm about giving non-denominational instruction in Graham's trust schools; their ordination oath required them to "be ready with all faithful diligence to banish and drive away all erroneous and strange doctrines contrary to God's Word") and a very few manufacturers had set up their own factory schools of equivalent quality; but there were populous manufacturing districts (Oldham and Ashton-under-Lyne were the examples given) where there were few or no efficient schools. Below these schools, there could be, for Dissenters, day schools associated with their place of worship – although often described in their locality as 'British' schools they were not formally so and in most cases, the quality of education given was in no way comparable. (The organisation and discipline of the Established Church prevented any similar phenomenon of 'unofficial' National schools.) Other than this the quality of education was generally poor.

==== The 'National Factory Schools' experiment ====
From 1838 onwards, Robert Saunders, the (Anglican) factory inspector for the West Riding, had been attempting to interest the government in a scheme for improving the education of factory children in the district. He got no satisfactory response from the government, but considerable interest from the local Anglican clergy and from the National Society, with whom he had discussed the scheme. (He does not appear to have tried to similarly involve local non-conformist clergy, or the British Society, whose schools and approach to the religious instruction he considered inferior. Nor does he seem to have considered the omission significant; from consultation of the parents of factory children he thought "Many would send their children to a school where the principle of Mahomet, or the worship of blocks and stones, were inculcated, without concerning themselves in the matter, if only the school-fee was less at such school than at the best school in the neighbourhood. Exceptions are happily to be found, but they are rare."). In December 1840, the National Society sought his advice on how the central organisation could best supplement local efforts for the education of factory children in the district. As a result of this collaboration, by the end of 1842, 940 children formerly attending factory schools were attending National Schools whose timetables were set up to accommodate the work patterns of the children (who in most cases were, as a result of Saunders' urging of mill-owners, working half-days – as envisaged by Fox-Maule's Factory Bill of 1839) The children were free to attend any Sunday school of their parents choice (the breakdown was 340 Anglican, 22 Catholic, 578 Non-conformist) but whilst at the National Factory Schools they received Anglican religious instruction; no parent complained of this (but 20 or so Catholic children had gone to a Catholic school in preference to the National Schools.) Meanwhile, Saunders had urged on Graham a scheme for "Government Factory Schools"; these would be run and controlled by Anglicans, and the default religious education in them would be as in National Schools, but parents could withhold their children from the specifically Anglican elements (the withheld children to be given instruction in other school subjects instead), thus obtaining a non-denominational religious education matching that in British Schools.

=== Graham's Factory Education bill (1843) ===
The debate on Ashley's motion was markedly non-partisan. Responding Graham said that, although the problem was a national one, the government would for the moment bring forward measures only for the two areas of education in which the state already had some involvement; the education of workhouse children and the education of factory children. The measures he announced related to England and Wales; Scotland had an established system of parochial schools run by its established church, with little controversy, since in Scotland there was no dissent on doctrine, only on questions of discipline. To allow for the provision of efficient schools where voluntary efforts had failed, the 'education clauses' of his Factory Education Bill allowed for trust schools to be set up. These would be initiated by voluntary effort, and – as previously for efficient voluntary schools – a third of capital costs could be supplied by a government grant; Graham proposed that in addition another third could be met by a government loan to be repaid from the poor rates. The running costs of such a school would be met by the deductions from children's wages allowed by the 1833 Act, supplemented by a charge on the poor rates. The trustees would be the Anglican parish priest and two of his churchwardens and four trustees (of whom two should preferably be mill-owners) nominated by the magistrates. The default religious education in these schools would be Anglican, but parents would be allowed to opt their children out of anything specifically Anglican; if the opt-out was exercised, religious education would be as in a British School. Once a trust school was open in a factory district, factory children in that district would have to provide a certificate that they were being educated at it or at some other school certified as 'efficient'.

The 'labour clauses' forming the other half of the bill were essentially a revival of Fox Maule's draft; children could work only in the morning or in the afternoon, but not both. There were two significant differences; the working day for children was reduced to six and a half hours, and the minimum age for factory work would be reduced to eight. Other clauses increased penalties and assisted enforcement.

==== Reaction inside Parliament ====
A Second Reading debate was held to flesh out major issues before going into committee. There was considerable opposition to the composition of the trustees, both as giving no voice to the ratepayers and as handing control of the school (and hence its children) to the Established Church with no provision for a Dissenter member of the trust to see fair play. The provisions for appointment of schoolmasters were also criticised; as they stood they effectively excluded Dissenters. At Lord John Russell's urging, (Note: "He was, for his own part, most anxious that the bill should work well and satisfactorily through the country. The greatest misfortune of all would be, that Parliament should be placed in such a situation as to be unable to do anything to advance the cause of education; but second only to this would be the calamity resulting from their passing a bill which should give rise to feelings of religious animosity, or which should produce sentiments of bitterness on such a subject as education. He trusted that by a temperate discussion of the principles and the details of the present bill, the House would be eventually enabled to adopt such a measure as would afford general satisfaction to the country, and as would lead to a general and improved system of education.") the discussion was temperate.

==== Opposition outside Parliament ====
Out of Parliament, the debate was less temperate; objections that the Bill had the effect of strengthening the Church became objections that it was a deliberate attack on Dissent, that its main purpose was to attack Dissent, and that the Royal Commission had deliberately and grossly defamed the population of the manufacturing districts to give a spurious pretext for an assault on Dissent. A crowded meeting at Leeds was told the bill was "..nothing more nor less than a new Test Act; it was virtually an attempt to impose, not merely Catholic, but also Protestant disabilities; and to exalt the Church at the expense of all classes of Dissenters ... If once they passed this measure, their liberty was at an end; that moment they would become enslaved; that moment would they become enslaved; that moment would they become enslaved to the priests of this country, which was the worst kind of thraldom it was possible to endure. These schools were designed, not to teach, but to throw them back into the middle ages, and to undo all that had been done by the advances of education during the last three centuries" Similar meetings were held throughout the country, and their resolutions condemning the bill and calling for its withdrawal were supported by a campaign of organised petitions: that session Parliament received 13,369 petitions against the bill as drafted with a total of 2,069,058 signatures. (For comparison, in the same session there were 4574 petitions for total repeal of the Corn Laws, with a total of 1,111,141 signatures. )

==== Successive retreats and final abandonment ====
Lord John Russell drafted resolutions calling for modification of the bill along the lines suggested in Parliament; the resolutions were denounced as inadequate by the extra-parliamentary opposition. Graham amended the educational clauses, but this only triggered a fresh round of indignation meetings and a fresh round of petitions (11,839 petitions and 1,920,574 signatures). Graham then withdrew the education clauses: "I hoped that it might be possible to obtain concurrence in a scheme of national education based on the principle of teaching the holy scriptures without an attempt to inculcate peculiar tenets. In that hope I have been wholly disappointed; I looked for peace, and I have encountered the most angry opposition, therefore I withdraw the educational clauses, although I take that step with deep regret, and with melancholy forebodings with regard to the progress of education" but this did not end the objections, since it did not entirely restore the status quo ante on education; indeed the education requirements of the 1833 Act now came under attack, the Leeds Mercury declaring education was something individuals could do for themselves "under the guidance of natural instinct and self-interest, infinitely better than Government could do for them". Hence "All Government interference to COMPEL Education is wrong" and had unacceptable implications: "If Government has a right to compel Education, it has right to compel RELIGION !" Although as late as 17 July Graham said he intended to get the bill though in the current session, three days later the bill was one of those Peel announced would be dropped for that session.

== Struggle in Parliament for the ten-hour day ==
=== 1844 – inconsistent votes on the ten-hour day; a twelve-hour Act is passed ===
In 1844 Graham again introduced a Bill to bring in a new Factory Act and repeal the 1833 Factory Act. The Bill gave educational issues a wide berth, but otherwise largely repeated the 'labour clauses' of Graham's 1843 Bill, with the important difference that the existing protection of young persons (a twelve-hour day and a ban on night working) was now extended to women of all ages. In Committee, Lord Ashley moved an amendment to the bill's clause 2, which defined the terms used in subsequent (substantive) clauses; his amendment changed the definition of 'night' to 6 p.m. to 6 a.m.-after allowing 90 minutes for meal-breaks only ten-and-a-half hours could be worked; this passed by nine votes. On clause 8, limiting the hours of work for women and young persons, the motion setting a twelve-hour day was defeated (by three votes: 183–186) but Lord Ashley's motion setting the limit at ten hours was also defeated (by seven votes:181–188).

Voting on this Bill was not on party lines, the issue revealing both parties to be split into various factions.

I never remember.. a more curious political state of things, such intermingling of parties, such a confusion of opposition, a question so much more open than any question ever was before, and yet not made so or acknowledged to be so with the Government; so much zeal, asperity, and animosity, so many reproaches hurled backwards and forwards. The Government have brought forward their measure in a very positive way, and have clung to it with great tenacity; rejecting all compromise, they have been abandoned by nearly half their supporters, and nothing can exceed their chagrin and soreness at being so forsaken. . . . John Russell, voting for ' ten hours ' after all he professed last year, has filled the world with amazement, and many of his own friends with indignation. . . . The Opposition was divided, Palmerston and Lord John one way. Baring and Labouchere the other. It has been a very queer affair. Some voted, not knowing how they ought to vote, and, following those they are accustomed to following, many who voted against the Government afterwards said they believed they were wrong. Melbourne is all against Ashley; all the political economists, of course; Lord Spencer strong against him.

Faced with these contradictory votes, and having considered and rejected the option of compromising on some intermediate time such as eleven hours, (Note: The contradictory votes arose (with exactly the same members voting) because five members voted against both 'ten' and 'twelve': three seem to have given no explanation, of the other two William Aldam spoke in support of an eleven-hour day in the 22 March debate, William Ewart spoke in favour of an eleven-hour compromise in the 25 March debate) Graham withdrew the Bill, preferring to replace it by a new one which amended, rather than repealed, the 1833 Act. The 1833 definition of night time being unaltered the revised Bill gave no opportunity to redefine 'night' and Lord Ashley's amendment to limit the working day for women and young persons to ten hours was defeated heavily (295 against, 198 for), it having been made clear that the Ministers would resign if they lost the vote. As a result, the Factory Act 1844 again set a twelve-hour day.
But – a Radical MP had warned the government during the debate on clause 8 – the moral effect of Ashley's first victory could never be undone by any subsequent vote:

...could any Government suppose that any such course would turn back into its former channels the feelings of the people, or make them forget what had passed the other night? No! the people would not forget it, and the Government would do well not to think so. He thought it very unimportant which way the majority turned this evening, as regarded the fate of the Measure; because it was already, above all governments and all majorities, absolutely decided. It was impossible now for any Government to stop a ten hours Bill. It was, in every moral sense, as much a part of the law of this country as any part of this interfering Bill which he held in his hand.

=== 1846 – a Ten-Hour Bill defeated ===
Lord Ashley introduced a Ten-Hour Bill in 1846 but then resigned from the Commons. The Second Reading of Ashley's Bill of 1846 was moved by John Fielden. Ashley was a member of the aristocracy (he became the 7th Earl of Shaftesbury on the death of his father), had sat for an agricultural constituency (Dorsetshire), and had resigned because he could no longer support the Corn Laws. Fielden came from a very different background; he was MP for Oldham a Lancashire 'cotton town' and was described by John Bright, opposing the Bill as the senior partner in the greatest cotton concern in England. He spoke from practical experience; as he explained in his 1836 pamphlet The Curse of The Factory System:

I well remember being set to work in my father's mill when I was a little more than ten years old; my associates, too, in the labour and in recreation are fresh in my memory. Only a few of them are now alive; some dying very young, others living to become men and women; but many of those who live have died off before they attained the age of fifty years, having the appearance of being much older, a premature appearance of age which I verily believe was caused by the nature of the employment in which they had been brought up. For several years after I began to work in the mill, the hours of labour in our works did not exceed ten in the day, winter and summer, and even with the labour of those hours, I shall never forget the fatigue I often felt before the day ended, and the anxiety of us all to be relieved from the unvarying and irksome toil we had gone through before we could obtain relief by such play and amusements as we resorted to when liberated from our work.

His Bill proposed a one-year experiment with an eleven-hour day before moving to a ten-hour day: Fielden did not rule out settling for a permanent reduction to eleven hours if the Bill was amended accordingly in Committee. There was considerable agitation in the country for a Ten-Hour Bill and more petitions were presented to Parliament supporting the 1846 Bill than for repeal of the Corn Laws; however, the Bill was defeated at Second Reading 193–203. The London Standard gave an analysis of the vote (including tellers) which summarised the voting of the three parties (Whigs, and the two Conservative factions) as:

Voting	Protectionist	Peelite	Whig	Total
For second reading	117	7	71	195
Against (not having voted for ten hours in 1844)	50	66	80	196
Against (having voted for ten hours in 1844)	1	7	1	9
Did not vote (having voted for ten hours in 1844)	15	11	20	46

=== 1847 – the Ten Hour Act is passed ===
Within a month, the Corn Laws had been repealed, the Peel administration had fallen and a Whig administration under Lord John Russell had come to power. (Note: Hutchins and Harrison have Parliament dissolved on the fall of the Peel administration and the Ten-hour movement exerting itself for the return of members favourable to the Bill regardless of Party label. This is wrong (always check your references, however reputable!). The Central Committee did advise its members to work for the return of pro-Ten Hour MPs should there be a General Election before a Ten-Hour Bill was again brought forward, but there was no dissolution (or General Election) in 1846: since MPs accepting office under the Crown had to seek re-election there was a cluster of by-elections in the seats of the new Whig ministers.) Russell's Cabinet contained both supporters and opponents of the 1846 Bill, and Russell declared at the earliest opportunity that the government had no collective view on the issue. In January 1847, Fielden introduced much the same bill as Ashley's Bill of the previous year. Most of the arguments in the 1847 Second Reading debate repeated those made in 1846, but there were three new ones:

1. the current trade recession was so severe that many mills were on short time and not working as much as ten hours a day (Note: In March 1847, out of a total of 179 mills in Manchester only 92 were working full time, 68 short time, and 17 were closed. Out of a total of 41,000 hands employed in these mills, 22,000, or about 50 per cent., were working full time, 13,500 were working short time, and 5,500 were stopped. The average number of working hours per day in Manchester was reduced to seven, and in the surrounding districts to eight hours –)- taking the lean years with the fact they had probably not worked more than a 10-hour day on average over the last decade
2. the working classes in the northern textile districts had been allowed to think that if they supported their masters in seeking the repeal of the Corn Laws their masters would support a Ten Hour Bill; whether or not the masters had made (or intended to keep) that promise, Parliament should see it was kept
3. that it was now inevitable that sooner or later the ten-hour day would become law (one speaker, referring to the extra-Parliamentary agitation and echoing comments about the Anti-Corn Law League said it hardly mattered what Parliament decided, the matter was already decided out of doors); better that Parliament should give it now with a good grace

To answer two arguments which opponents of the 1846 Bill had made much of, meetings (twenty-one in all) were held in most of the major textile towns of Northern England: all were well attended, and at each motion were passed to declare that

- what was sought was a ten-hour day (not an eleven-hour one)
- that a reduction from a twelve-hour day to a ten-hour day was sought, even if there was a corresponding reduction in wages

The 1847 Bill passed its Second Reading by 195 votes to 87 and went into Committee stage on a majority of 90 (190 for, 100 against). In Committee, the crucial vote for ten hours, rather than eleven was won 144–66 and the Bill subsequently passed its Third Reading by 151 to 88. Lord John Russell voted for the Bill (at Report Stage he had said he thought an eleven-hour bill safer but that would not persuade him to vote against a ten-hour one), Sir Robert Peel against. Lord George Bentinck, the leader of the Protectionist Conservatives in the Commons, did not vote on the Third Reading but at Second Reading and Report Stage he had (as in 1846) voted for the Bill although in 1844 he had voted consistently for 12 hours and against ten. The overall leader of the Protectionist Conservatives Lord Stanley had sat in the Lords since 1844 (and therefore had not voted on the 1846 Bill); in 1844 he sat in the Commons as the MP for North Lancashire and like Bentinck had voted for twelve hours and against ten.

Against the strongly held view of most of the Conservative party that the Corn Laws were vital to the prosperity of British agriculture, they had been repealed by Peel as a result of Free Trade agitation led by Northern millowners . The agricultural interest in the Conservative party had therefore repudiated Peel (who had opposed further reduction of the working day) and split the party. A Whig MP alleged that the 1847 Bill was motivated by the landlords seeking their revenge on the millowners, but it will be seen from the above that support for the Ten-Hour Bills was relatively steady throughout; the 1847 one passed because opposition to it collapsed. With very few exceptions, the Conservative supporters of the Ten Hour Bill in 1847 had -like Bentinck and Lord John Manners voted for the 1846 Bill and with slightly more exceptions (including Bentinck) (Note: "I have a right to say for a majority of my friends, though not for myself, that so far from this being a mere party move on their part, they were, almost to a man, supporters of the very same view of this question two years ago." LGB in 1846 Second Reading debate) for 10 hours in 1844; although not all claimed – like Manners – to have "the gratifying conviction that they, the Tory Gentlemen of England, had maintained their just and historical position; that, consistently with the character they had ever aspired to, they had fought the fight of the poor against the rich, and had been fellow-soldiers with the weak and defenceless against the mighty and the strong, and to the best of their ability, had wielded the power which the Constitution reposed in them, to protect and defend the working-people of this country.". However the Corn Laws may have had some effect: on the analysis of the Standard fifty-one Protectionist Conservatives had voted with Peel in 1846, but he no longer had any call on their loyalty and the argument that a Ten-Hour Act should be opposed because it would ruin Northern millowners now had less force; many abstained in 1847, only four of the fifty-one named by the Standard voting against the Bill's Second Reading; six against the Bill being considered in Committee.

== Popular support ==
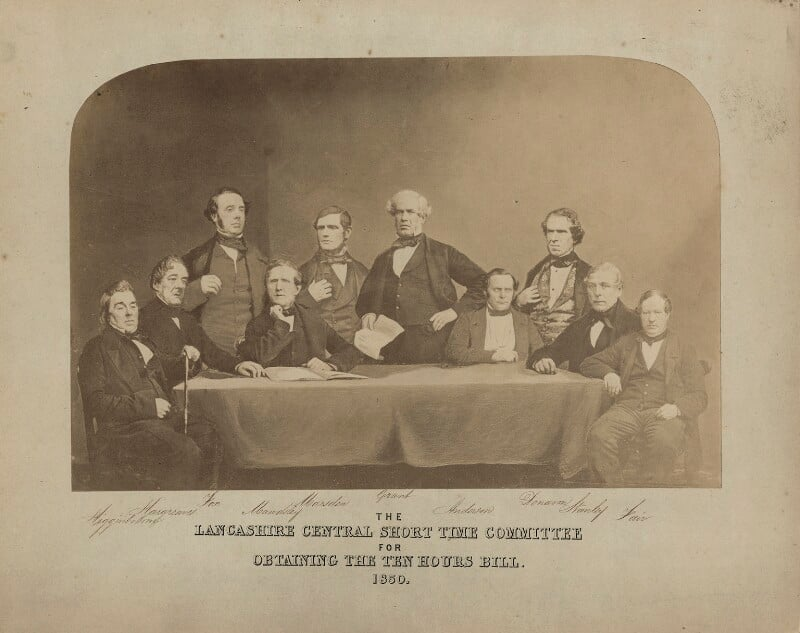
Meeting of the Lancashire Central Short Time Committee in 1850

In Lancashire and Yorkshire 'Short Time Committees' aiming to secure a ten-hour day had been formed by millworkers even before the 1833 Act. They had succeeded in establishing a strong feeling among millworkers for a Ten Hour Act, and in gaining supporters in all classes of society

My Lords, the measures now proposed for your acceptance have originated in far different quarters than in the mind of one so little entitled to your Lordships' attention as myself. They have originated in the crowded receptacles of human labour—they have been elaborated in the factory and the alley, amid the whirl of machinery, and in those long rows of lodging houses which grow up around the giant chimneys of Lancashire and Yorkshire. This Bill has its root in the stern experience of the husband and the father. From this humble, but, I am sure in your Lordships' view, not contemptible seed, the idea has mounted upwards in the shape of such petitions as those which have encumbered your Lordships' Table. Men of higher education—men whose lives are one professional and practical exercise of philanthropy, have assisted the progress of the measure to the ears of the Legislature by their sanction and their advocacy; medical men in every branch of practice, clergymen of every religious persuasion. Springing from such a source, founded on such a basis of feeling and opinion, it has made its way through much difficulty against powerful opposition, till it has obtained the sanction of an influential portion of the Cabinet, of a conclusive majority of the House of Commons, and, so supported and recommended, has reached the Table of your Lordships' House.

The so-called "ten hour movement", led mostly by members of the Anglican Church, rallied public support for the Bill. Many different groups supported the act, including many Quakers, workers, and even some factory owners like John Fielden. Many committees were formed in support of the cause and some previously established groups lent their support as well. A paper the "Ten Hours' Advocate and the Journal of Literature and Art" was produced and concentrated almost exclusively on the ten-hour cause. Crucially, a deluge of petitions to Parliament and a series of large public meetings in the manufacturing districts passing resolutions in favour of a Ten-Hour Act were organised. (Note: For example the London Standard of 4 March 1846 reported "A numerous meeting of the factory operatives and other inhabitants of" Manchester " was held in the large room of the Town Hall, for the purpose of petitioning parliament in favour of the Ten Hours Bill. The meeting was called for eight o’clock, but long before that hour the room was crowded, and the whole street in front of the hall was also filled with people, anxious to gain admission. …(O)n the platform there were a very large number of the clergy of the Established Church, several surgeons of the town, and dissenting ministers ") These both nullified arguments that the Bill was against the interests and the wishes of (the better sort of) millworkers and established a strong moral pressure on Parliament:

The people deserved this measure. They had for many years besought Parliament to grant them a Ten Hours Bill; and he thought that the manner in which they had agitated the question entitled them to the most favourable consideration of the Legislature. They had sought to obtain it by the most peaceable means; they had never had recourse to violent agitations, to strikes, or combinations against their employers. They never had committed a breach of the peace at any of the great meetings held upon this question; but their conduct had always been characterized by regularity, and by manifestations of loyalty. It would, therefore, be only an act of justice to those loyal, peaceable, and industrious men to pass this Bill.

The year following its passage, Karl Marx made reference to the bill in The Communist Manifesto as a victory for ordinary workers.

== Major contributors ==
"At a General Meeting of the Lancashire Central Short Time Committee, held at the house of Mr Thomas Wilkinson, Red Lion Inn, Manchester, on Tuesday evening, 8 June 1847, the following resolutions were unanimously adopted.

- That this Committee feel deeply thankful to the disposer of all good gifts, for the glorious success which has attended their efforts to ameliorate the condition of the women and children employed in factories, and sincerely congratulate their fellow-labourers in the good work on the peaceful and constitutional character of the agitation, as well as the triumphant manner in which the Ten Hours' Bill has passed the British Parliament.
- That the hearty thanks of this Committee are due, and are hereby gratefully tendered on behalf of the working people of Lancashire, to the Right Honourable Lord Ashley, for his zealous and efficient services in this sacred cause, during a period of fourteen years of constant, consistent, and exemplary perseverance, to improve the moral, religious, and mental condition of the factory workers by endeavouring to obtain for them leisure hours to be devoted to that purpose; and especially for the zeal and activity he has displayed during the present session of Parliament.
- That the best thanks of this Committee are also due to John Fielden, Esq., MP, for the honest, consistent and straightforward conduct which he has ever pursued on behalf of his poorer fellow-countrymen; and especially for his exertions during the present session of Parliament in bringing the agitation for the Ten Hours' Bill to a successful issue.
- That this Committee tender their heartfelt thanks to the Right Honourable the Earl of Ellesmere and Lord Faversham, for their zealous exertions in conducting the Ten Hours' Bill safely through the House of Lords.
- That this Committee are deeply grateful and tender their best thanks to J. Brotherton, Esq., MP, (Note: " ... he had worked in a factory himself till he had reached his sixteenth year. He had worked twelve and fourteen hours a-day, and had undergone all the privations which factory children endured. For these young persons he felt the deepest sympathy; and though he had been raised to the highest honour which man could confer on him — that of sitting in the British House of Commons — he could never forget his former station." J B speaking during Committee stage of the 1833 Factories Act) H. A. Aglionby, Esq., MP., C. Hindley, Esq., MP., and all those members who spoke and voted in favour of this measure during its progress in the House of Commons.
- That this Committee are deeply impressed with the gratitude they owe to the Duke of Richmond, the Bishops of Oxford, London, and St. David's, and all the peers who spoke and voted in favour of the Ten Hours' Bill.
- That this Committee offer their most hearty congratulations and sincere thanks to John Wood, Richard Oastler, W. Walker, Thomas Fielden, and Joseph Gregory, Esqrs., and to the Rev. G. S. Bull, for their support of this cause in times when it was unpopular to be ranked amongst its advocates; and also to all its friends and supporters out of Parliament.
- That this Committee view with extreme satisfaction the past support of the clergy of the Established Church, as well as of those ministers of religion of all denominations who were ever found amongst the supporters of this measure, and sincerely hope that they will live to see realised the happy results which we believe were the aim and object of all their pious labours in this cause.…"

=== Lord Shaftesbury ===
The 7th Earl of Shaftesbury, known at the time as Lord Ashley, was leader of the Factory Reform Movement in the House of Commons and played an extensive role in the passage of British factory reform in the mid-19th century and was an especially avid supporter of the Factory Act of 1847. Lord Shaftesbury was an evangelical Anglican and Tory MP who worked tirelessly for labour reform in England. He was responsible in some way for the passage of nearly every labour reform bill from when he entered Parliament in 1826 until his resignation in 1847. He later continued reform in the House of Lords.

=== Richard Oastler ===
Richard Oastler was a staunch Christian, son of a leading Methodist but subsequently a Churchman. He lent his exuberant oratorical and writing skills to the cause of factory reform, focusing especially on the ten-hour movement. Sometimes called the "Danton of the factory movement," Oastler was the leading voice for reform outside Parliament. Oastler was known for dramatic rhetoric and for hinting at future violence should things get worse. In his "A letter to those millowners who continue to oppose the Ten Hours bill and who impudently dare to break the present Factories act," Oastler had addressed factory owners who he described as "murderers". In his usual style he wrote, "If blood must flow, let it be the blood of lawbreakers, tyrants, and murderers ... infanticide shall cease". Oastler had been convinced that reform must come either by legislation or by force. By the time a Ten-Hour Act was passed, however, Oastler had greatly moderated his rhetoric; on the political level the evils he had campaigned against were greatly reduced by the existing Factory Act and increasing compliance with it; on the personal level he was deeply touched by the knowledge that his release from debtors' prison had been assisted by donations from those who differed greatly from his politics and his views on factory reform. After his release, he treated opposing millowners as a misguided and unrepresentative minority, rather than wicked.

=== John Fielden ===
John Fielden was born a Quaker but had become a Unitarian and was a cotton mill owner from Todmorden who fought tirelessly for the passage of the Factory Act of 1847. Fielden took a leading role in the struggle for reform even before his election to the House of Commons in 1832. Upon the resignation of Lord Shaftesbury in 1847 it became the responsibility of John Fielden to see to the successful passage of the 1847 act. It has been said that no one did more for the cause of the ten hours movement than John Fielden.

== Enforcement ==
Difficulties immediately arose over the enforcement of the act, as millowners used legal loopholes to evade its provisions and the courts proved reluctant to intervene so that Lord Ashley, for example, concluded in 1850: "The Ten Hours’ Act nullified. The work to be done all over again". Supplementary acts in 1850 and 1853 did, however, see a ten-hour limit established in the textile industry, and without the negative economic effects its opponents had feared to come to pass.

Thereafter the use of child labour certainly declined in Victorian Britain, though historians divide on whether this was the result of the law in action, as the Factory Prosecutions Returns would seem to suggest, or merely a by-product of technological change.

== Subsequent developments ==
The whole act was repealed by section 21 of the Factory Act 1874 (37 & 38 Vict. c. 44), which came into force on 1 January 1875.

== See also ==
- Factory Acts
