= Robert Francis Walker =

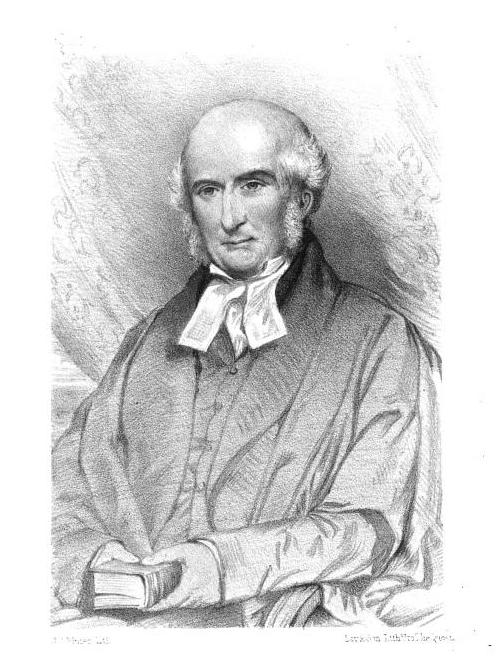
- Born: 15 January 1789
- Died: 31 January 1854 (aged 65)

Robert Francis Walker (1789–1854) was an English cleric and author, known as a translator of works of German evangelical writers.

== Life ==
The son of Robert Walker of Oxford, he was born there on 15 January 1789. He received his earlier education at Magdalen College School, Oxford, and as a chorister in chapel is said to have been tipped by Lord Nelson.

Walker entered New College, Oxford, in 1806, and graduated B.A. in 1811, M.A. in 1813. In 1812 he was appointed chaplain to New College. For the period 1813–5 he was curate at St Ebbe's Church, Oxford, an evangelical stronghold.

In 1815 Walker became curate at Taplow; at the end of 1816 or the beginning of 1817 he removed to Henley-on-Thames; and in 1819 he went to Purleigh, Essex, where he was curate in charge to an absentee rector, Edward Copleston, the Provost of Oriel College, Oxford.

Walker remained at Purleigh for 30 years, until poor health compelled him to give up his charge. In 1848, struck with paralysis, he went to reside at Great Baddow, near Chelmsford, and there he died on 31 January 1854. He was buried at Purleigh.

== Works ==
Walker translated several German evangelical works:

- Sermons, 1835, by Ludwig Hofacker.
- Elijah the Tishbite, 1836, by Friedrich Wilhelm Krummacher.
- Glimpse of the Kingdom of Grace, 1837.
- Elisha, 1838.
- Memoirs of Johann Albrecht Bengel, 1837, by Johann Christian Friedrich Burk.
- History of the Church, 1840, by Christian Gottlob Barth.
- Christian Missions, 1844, by Christian Gottlieb Blumhardt.
- Memoir of Hilmar Ernst Rauschenbusch, by Wilhelm Leipoldt.

He left other works in manuscript.

== Family ==
Walker was twice married:

1. To Frances Langton at Cookham, Berkshire, in 1814 (by her he had four sons and one daughter, and she died in 1824); and
2. To Elizabeth Palmer at Olney, Buckinghamshire, on 30 September 1830 (by her he had five sons, and she died in 1876).

== Notes ==
Attribution

This article incorporates text from a publication now in the public domain: Lee, Sidney, ed. (1899). "Walker, Robert Francis". Dictionary of National Biography. Vol. 59. London: Smith, Elder & Co.
