= Purleigh =

Village in Essex, England

Coordinates: 51.687°N 0.659°E

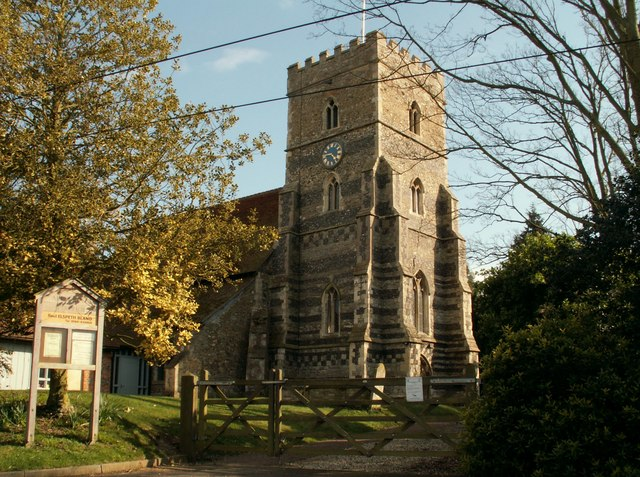
- All Saints' Church, Purleigh

- Location within Essex
- Population: 1,286 (Parish, 2021)
- OS grid reference: TL838020
- District: Maldon
- Shire county: Essex
- Region: East
- Country: England
- Sovereign state: United Kingdom
- Post town: Chelmsford
- Postcode district: CM3
- Dialling code: 01245 & 01621
- Police: Essex
- Fire: Essex
- Ambulance: East of England
- UK Parliament: Maldon

Purleigh is a village on the Dengie peninsula about 4 miles (6.4 km) south of Maldon in the English county of Essex. The village is part of the Purleigh ward of the Maldon district. At the 2021 census the parish had a population of 1,286.

The place-name 'Purleigh' is first attested in a charter of 998, where it appears as Purlea. In the Domesday Book of 1086 it appears as Purlai. The name means 'bittern clearing'.

== Governance ==
An electoral ward in the same name exists. This ward stretches south to North Fambridge with a total population taken at the 2011 Census of 3,419.

== Descent of the manor ==
=== Eustace, Earl of Boulogne ===
At the time of the Domesday survey of 1086, the manor of Purleigh was held by Eustace II, Count of Boulogne (d.1087).

=== Denys ===
Having previously been possessed by the Grey and Capel families, in the late 15th century the manor was acquired by Hugh Denys, Groom of the Stool to King Henry VII. He died without progeny and bequeathed the manor to his younger half-nephew John Denys of Pucklechurch, Gloucestershire, in which family, having modernised the spelling of its name to "Dennis", the manor remained until the early 18th century. William Dennis, 5th in descent from John, died in 1701 and was buried at Pucklechurch. He was Sheriff of Gloucestershire in 1689 and died without male issue, leaving two daughters as his co-heiresses. Mary (d.1739), the elder, married Col. James Butler, of the family of the Earls of Ormond, and Elizabeth the younger daughter married, as his second wife, Sir Alexander Cuming of Culter, Aberdeenshire. The manor was retained by both sisters jointly, but was occupied by the tenant John Leaver, and comprised the manor house called Purleigh Hall, a garden, orchard, 100 acres of land, 80 acres of meadow, 140 acres of pasture and 80 acres of woodland. It then passed, probably by sale, to William Neale, described as a "clerk" in a decree of the High Court of Chancery dated 29 January 1741, in an action brought by the nieces of Mary Dennis and by Cassandra Cuming, the daughter of Elizabeth Dennis and the representatives of the infant James Cuming.

=== Bonnell ===
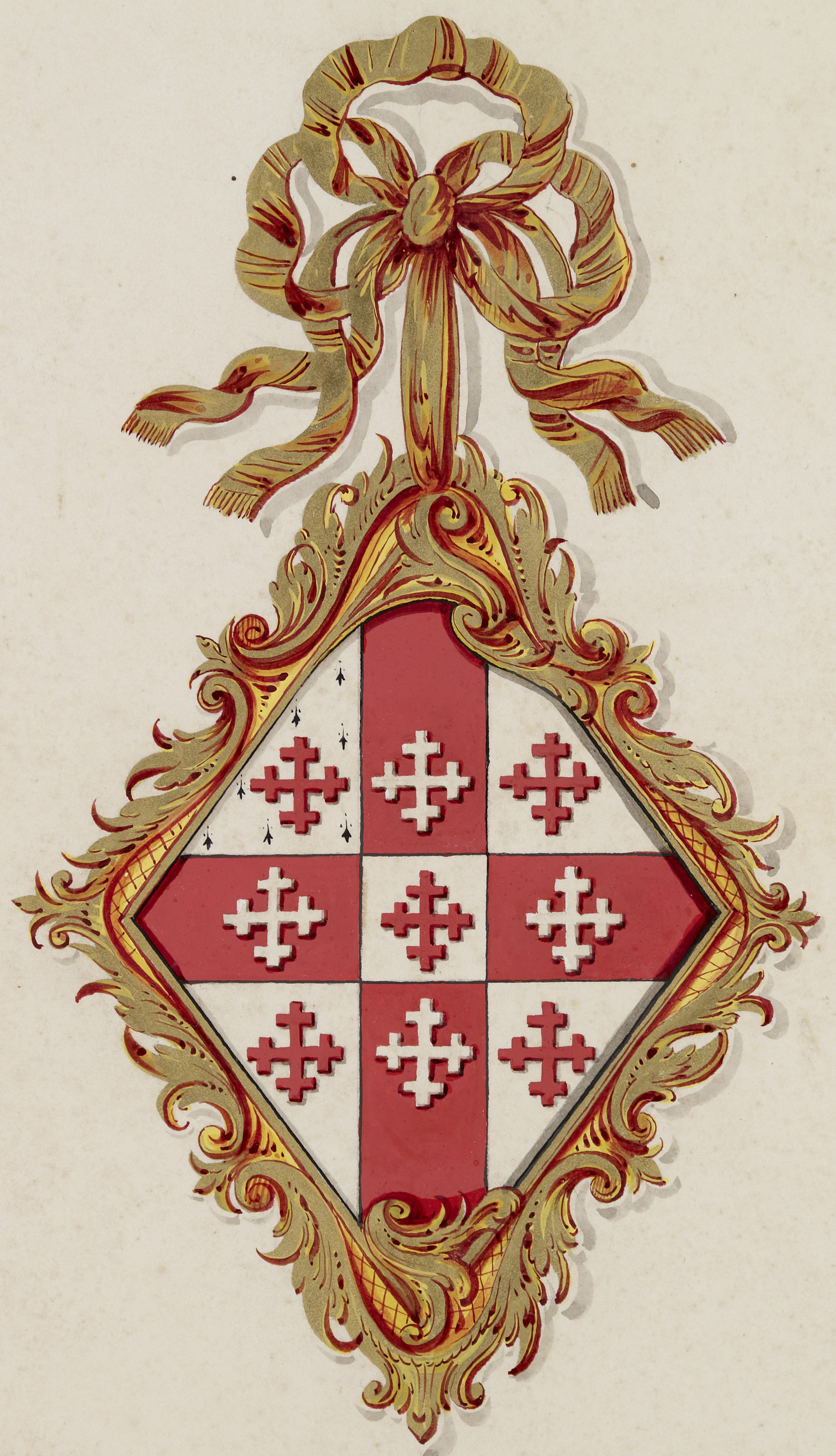
Arms of Bonnell, granted 1691, shown in a lozenge as borne by a female: Argent, a cross gules quarterly pierced nine crosses crosslet three, three and three counterchanged

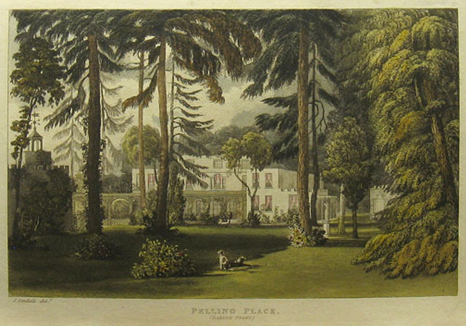
Pelling Place, Old Windsor, garden front, in 1820. Seat of Bonnell family. Aquatint after John Grendall

Neale sold it in 1742 to James Bonnell. James was the son of Captain John Bonnell, a merchant of London, possibly the Captain John Bonnell of the East India Company who sailed the Chandos to Madras 4 February 1689 -1 January 1691. James was executor of the will of his mother Margaretta Bonnell, his father's second wife, and sister and heiress of a moiety of the estate of Edmund Waterson of Graces in Little Baddow in Essex, who by his last will ordered his personal estate to be invested in land in Suffolk James's siblings, John and Sarah Bonnell, authorised him to pay £4,000 (out of the total moiety of £14,735 5s.) for the purchase of the manor and farm of Purleigh Hall. Sarah Bonnell (d.1768) left at her death £3,500 in public funds for the endowment of a charity school for girls in West Ham, still surviving as the Sarah Bonnell School, the oldest girls' school in England. An elaborate white marble monument exists to Capt John Bonnell and his family in the Monoux Chapel of Walthamstow Church.

James Bonnell was lord of the manor of Purleigh in 1759. James Bonnell purchased Pelling Place and adjoining land including Beaumont Lodge in Old Windsor, Berkshire. James Bonnell of Spring Gardens, St Martin-in-the-Field, Westminster, died in 1774 and his estate was the subject of a case in Chancery between James Beal, of St. James's, Westminster, plaintiff, who had assumed by royal licence dated 1774 the additional surname and arms of Bonnell, as was required by the will of James Bonnell, and John Bonnell of Newcastle and other Bonnell deforciants ('land-owners') from Durham. In 1853 by deed of gift Mary Anne Harvey Bonnell, spinster, of Pelling Place, Windsor, lady of the manor of Purleigh, who had herself adopted the additional surname of Bonnell in 1841, conveyed to James Bonnell, esq., the whole Bonnell estate. James was the middle son of James Bonnell, who set up as a chemist and druggist in Carlisle when a young man in 1796, who became a manufacturer of aerated soda water, trading from premises in English Street, Carlisle. He sold the business in 1846, none of his sons having wished to continue in the trade. James jnr. in 1854 married Elizabeth Lowther, his cousin through his mother Esther Lowry. In 1860 James Bonnell obtained a licence to add the name Harvey before Bonnell.

The tenant in occupation in 1836 was William Clarke (senior). Clarke was born at Little Hallingbury, about 20 miles away, but his wife was born in 1814 at Purleigh. A painting of the Bonnell family armorials is held by Essex Archives, blazoned as follows: Argent, a cross gules charged with five cross crosslets argent between four of the fame gules, alternatively: Argent, a cross gules quarterly pierced 9 cross crosslets 3, 3 and 3 counter-charged. Queen Adelaide breakfasted with the Bonnell family on one occasion at Pelling Place, when the family gave her a shell-work vase, one of a pair home-made circa 1779-1781 by Mrs Beal Bonnell and Miss Harvey Bonnell, the other of which stood on a mantelpiece at Pelling and is now in the Victoria & Albert Museum, London.

=== Irving ===
The manor passed to the Irving family by the marriage in 1871 of Elizabeth Bonnell, of Pelling Place, to William John Irving of Penrith, Cumbria. The marriage settlement dated 6 March 1871 deals with the manors of Purleigh and Waltons, together with a number of farms, land, a windmill, as well as Pelling Place itself and large tracts of land in Old Windsor. William was a solicitor, the son of William Irving (1808–1870), FRCS, of Crown Square, Penrith, by Jane Raw of Leaming House, Watermillock, also in Cumbria. A tragedy occurred in the summer of 1884 when William J. Irving and his children Elizabeth, Charles and John drowned.

== Purleigh Colony ==
The Purleigh Colony, established in 1896 at Cock Clarks, was a Tolstoyan anarchist colony that grew out of the Croydon Brotherhood Church. Initially based on a 10 acres (4.0 ha) plot, as the group grew the colony began to rent local cottages with land attached. The colony ran a printing press, publishing translations of Tolstoy and for a while The New Order magazine. For a time the colony sheltered some of the Doukhobors, forced to leave Russia to avoid political persecution. The colony was always a fissile mix, and began to break down towards the end of 1900; some colonists moved with the Doukhobors to Canada, while others went on to form the Whiteway Colony in Gloucestershire. A further group, headed by Tolstoy's literary agent, Vladimir Chertkov, moved to Tuckton near Christchurch in Dorset, where they traded as 'The Free Age Press' – producing dirt-cheap versions of Tolstoy's religious and ethical texts, for an English readership.

== Local amenities ==
There are three public houses, The Bell, The Fox and Hounds and The Roundbush. The Bell is a 14th-century building that was refurbished in the 16th century.

The local school is Purleigh Community Primary School.

Purleigh playing field is home to Purleigh Cricket Club, who in 2008 broke a British record by scoring 499–5 in just 45 overs against Herongate II.

== All Saints' Church ==
The parish church is All Saints. It is of 14th-century origin.

Lawrence Washington, the great-great-grandfather of the first U.S. president, George Washington, was rector in the village from 1632 until 1643, when he was ejected from Purleigh for being a "common frequenter of ale-houses" - though the real reason was probably that he was a Royalist. When he died in 1652 he was buried in the graveyard of All Saints' Church, Maldon.

Rev Robert Francis Walker who was a curate, from 1819 to 1854, and a well-known translator of Christian books from German to English, is buried in the churchyard.
