= Richard Oastler =

English politician (1789–1861)

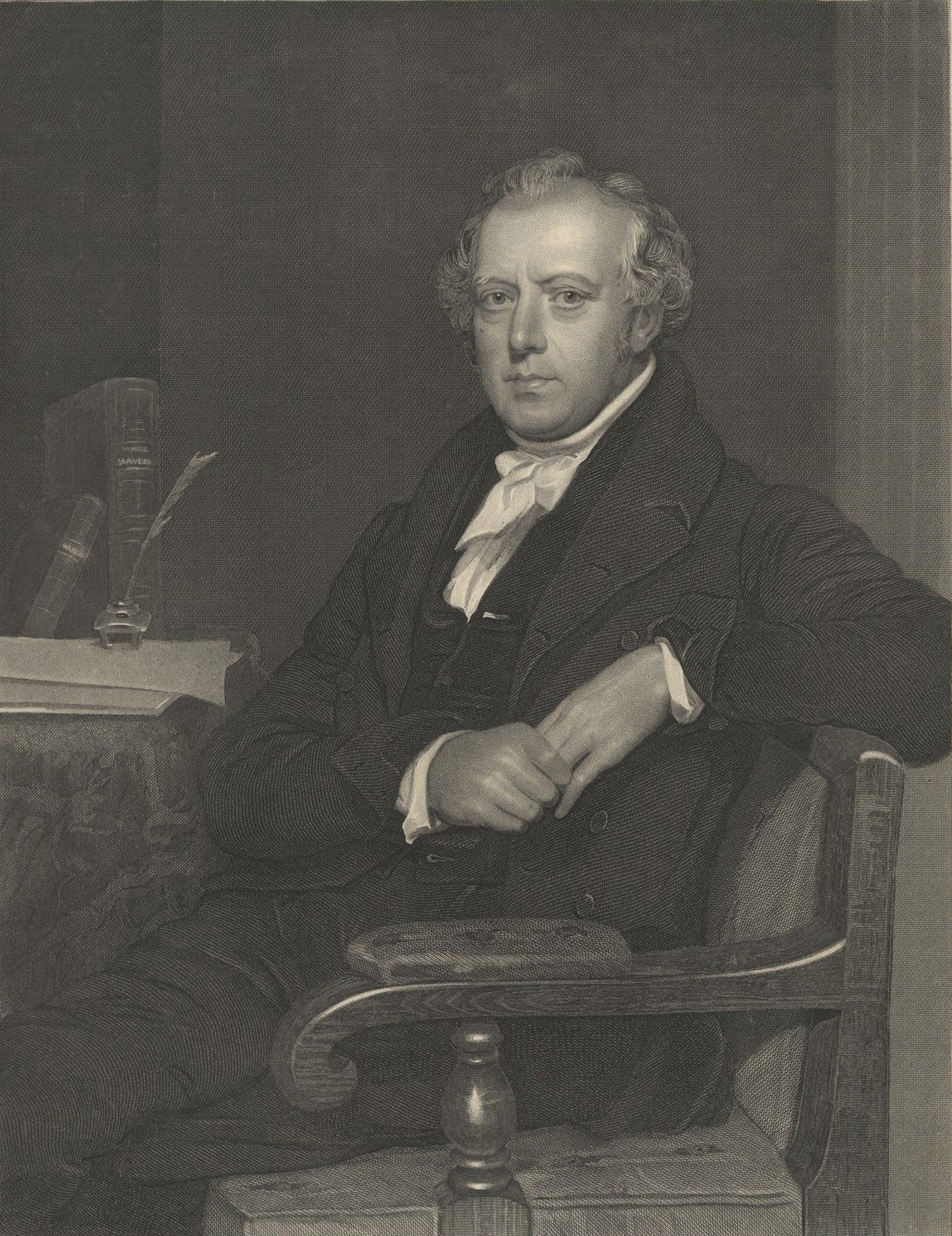
- Engraving given away with the Northern Star by James Posselwhite, after a painting by Benjamin Garside.
- Born: 20 December 1789; Leeds, West Riding of Yorkshire, England
- Died: 22 August 1861 (aged 71); Harrogate, West Riding of Yorkshire, England
- Burial place: St Stephen's Church, Kirkstall, Leeds
- Known for: Ten Hours Factory Bill
- Spouse: Mary Tatham
- Children: 2 (died by 1819)

Notes
- "Mr Oastler is a large heavy-looking man, between 50 and 60 years of age. His complexion is ghastly pale: his eyes, grey and staring, have little expression in them; and, with very common features, he has the appearance of a mechanic in his Sunday clothes."

Richard Oastler (20 December 1789 – 22 August 1861) was a "Tory radical", an active opponent of Parliamentary Reform and a lifelong admirer of the Duke of Wellington; but also an abolitionist and prominent in the "anti-Poor Law" resistance to the implementation of the "New Poor Law" of 1834. Most notably, as his sobriquet of the "Factory King" indicates, he was at the heart of the campaign for a ten-hour working day in its early years: although less so by the time of its successful culmination in the Factories Act 1847, he retained the sobriquet.

"Moved by pity and indignation at the long hours worked by young children in factories, he devoted his life to their emancipation, and was a tireless champion of the Ten Hours Factory Bill" noted a commemorative plaque erected in Leeds parish church in 1925. "He cannot altogether claim prominence as a political thinker...but history acclaims him not as a politician, but as an agitator" commented the Yorkshire Post on that occasion.

== Early years ==
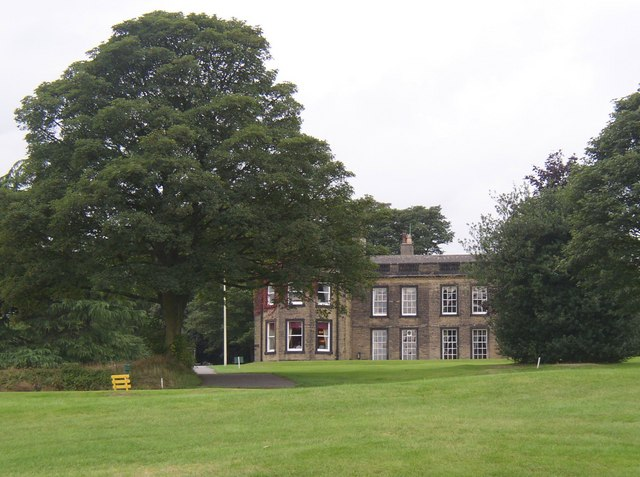
Fixby Hall

Born in Leeds, West Riding of Yorkshire, (Note: In St Peter's Square, then a genteel area: the house was demolished in the Quarry Hill slum clearances of the 1930s.) Oastler was the youngest of ten children born to Sarah (a daughter of Joseph Scurr) and Robert Oastler, a linen merchant. Robert continued to live in Leeds when he later became steward for Thomas Thornhill, the absentee landlord of Fixby, a large estate near Huddersfield, and of Calverley (between Leeds and Bradford, to the north of both). When Richard was six, his twelve-year-old brother Robert died as a result of a fire in a flax mill. (Note: Even in his most intemperate utterances in later life Oastler, unlike J R Stephens, never included mill fires (by act of God or of disgruntled workers) in the ills to be expected if things got any worse, and was quick to respond to any description of himself as an "incendiary"; but he never mentioned his brother's death.) Richard attended a Moravian boarding school from 1798 to 1806 ("It was there that I learned to be bold, for I was taught there to fear nothing but sin"), and then (his father vetoing Richard's desire to become a barrister) started training to become an architect.

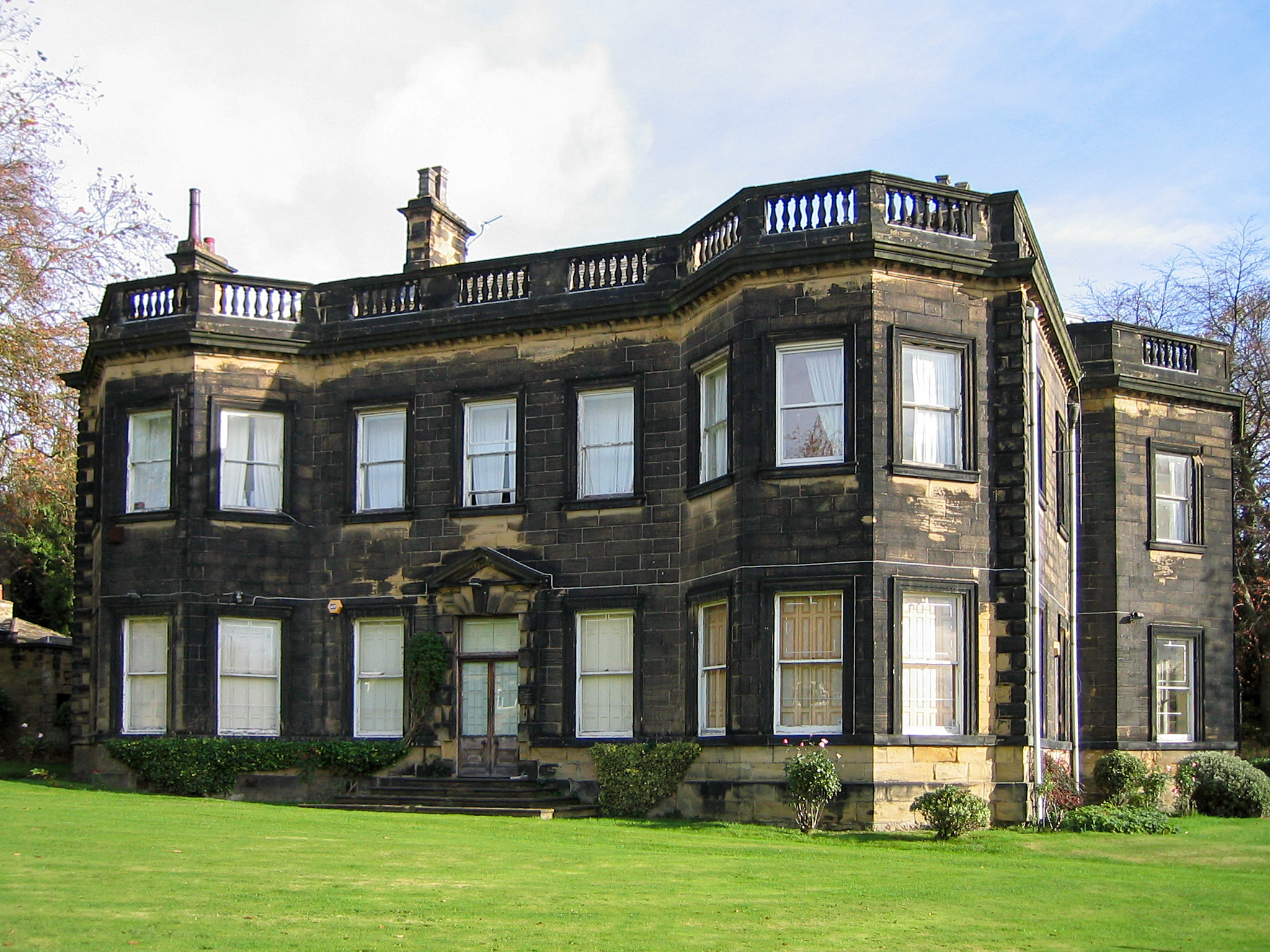
Gledhow Hall

After four years his failing sight forced him to give this up; in 1810 he became a commission agent, dealing in oils and dry-saltery: he also acted as a steward for the Dixons of Gledhow Hall near Leeds, and was used by his father from time to time to carry out work for the Fixby estate (as when in 1812 he organised precautions against the Luddites). (Note: Oastler dates this to 1811 with some uncertainty, but the Luddite troubles round Huddersfield were in 1812. There were earlier troubles, though: at the York Lent Assizes of 1809, Thornhill successfully sued the inhabitants of Huddersfield for £372, the value of 4 acres of plantation burnt down by unknown persons in the night. Thornhill moved his country seat from Fixby to Riddlesworth Hall, Norfolk in 1808 or 1809.) He became involved in charity work in Leeds; sick visiting with Michael Thomas Sadler and organising charitable relief of the destitute. In 1816, he married Mary Tatham, daughter of Mary (née Strickland, from Leeds) and Thomas Tatham, a Nottingham grocer. Richard and Mary had two children, both of whom had died by 1819. (Note: A Tatham niece, loosely referred to as an adopted daughter, later became part of the household; Mary's brother Thomas Robert Tatham became a surgeon in Huddersfield; it was to his house that the Oastler's moved on leaving Fixby Hall) Early in 1820 he went bankrupt; later that year on the death of his father, he was invited to succeed him as steward of the Fixby estate, looking after a rent roll of £18,000 per year, on an annual salary of £300. He accepted, moving to Fixby Hall in 1821. When in 1827 the vicar of Halifax (in which parish Fixby lay) attempted to increase his income by "resuming" collection of various tithes which he claimed to be "customary", Oastler was prominent in opposition. He later claimed that it was this struggle that had broken his health, leaving him liable to periodic breakdowns in health.

== Political philosophy ==
To Oastler "Tory-Radical" was not a description of a political philosophy (and certainly not of his) but of a tactical alliance of the supporters of two different philosophies against the Whigs. He was a "Church and King" Tory but, as the Duke of Wellington noted, a strange one. He denied any element of Radicalism in his political philosophy, and regarded himself as an "ultra-Tory" rather than a Peelite "Conservative"; he thought Peel too readily accepted (and adopted) the Whig application of the modern doctrines of "political economy" to the country's problems. He held that God knew better than Malthus: nothing could supersede Biblical injunctions that the poor should not be oppressed and the distressed should be succoured. Market forces were not a "hidden hand" working for some greater good, nor was interference with them imprudent folly. On the contrary

I believe that man is a fallen, selfish, ignorant being, and that every unregulated and unrestrained action of his is fraught with evil – that, if left without the restraining and regulating laws of God (which, by our Constitution, must be part and parcel of the laws of the land), instead of preferring such schemes, in the search of his own advantage, as would be advantageous to the society, his selfishness would lead him to injure all for his own benefit. I learn this from the Holy Bible. I have often witnessed it.

Reform on a Whig laissez-faire agenda had worsened the condition of the poor and led to chronic discontent, to which the response was greater centralisation and greater coercion; this was a vicious circle which could only end badly. He had seen the "poor deluded famished Luddites" and thought them to be pitied rather than feared – only because they were famished had they allowed themselves to be deluded. English working people loved peace, order and their old local habits; they disliked change and confusion

The great mistake in the minds of those raised above the working class is, that they think the people want plunder and anarchy. I know they want no such thing – they want peace and rest – and their rights. They want to be able to go out in a morning, get a good day's work done, and come home with a fair remuneration...

The 1831 Bristol riots, which seemingly proved Oastler's claim that coercion was essential

If the working men of England were dealt with according to the Bible rather than "political economy" their economic woes would disappear. With those woes gone support for Reform, Radicalism, trades unionism etc. would evaporate. There would then be no need for a centralised coercive state apparatus: instead the throne (and the rest of the constitution) would rest on the securest foundation – the love of the people. To Oastler, therefore, rich Whigs were a greater danger to the status quo than were working-class Radicals. Until the 1840s, very few Tories would have agreed with him: events such as the 1831 Bristol riots seeming to provide evidence that coercion was essential. (Note: But by 1848 Lord Ashley at a tea party in the Free Trade Hall in celebration of the passing of the Ten Hours Factory Bill, speaking to an audience of about 3,000, mostly factory operatives could say 'I have had the honour of speaking to her majesty of the character of her subjects, particularly in these vast counties; I had the honour of telling her what I have said to you tonight, that I did not believe there was a finer material to rule over, I did not believe there was a body of men capable of more generous sentiments than the operative classes of the great kingdom that God in his providence had called her to govern. And I tell you it would have done your hearts good to hear the ardent and the fervent manner in which her majesty replied "I know it, I know it well, I fully believe what you say; I am sure they are as good a material as any sovereign was ever called upon to rule"' and be greeted with - (Tremendous cheering)) Working class radicals were initially dubious about allying themselves with an opponent of their constitutional aspirations, but eventually came to value Oastler more highly than many of their ostensible allies; a co-belligerent "above purchase and above suspicion" on bread-and-butter issues: the portrait of Oastler reproduced in this article was given away by the Chartist Northern Star in its series of prints of "Portraits of Patriots".

== Factory Reform ==
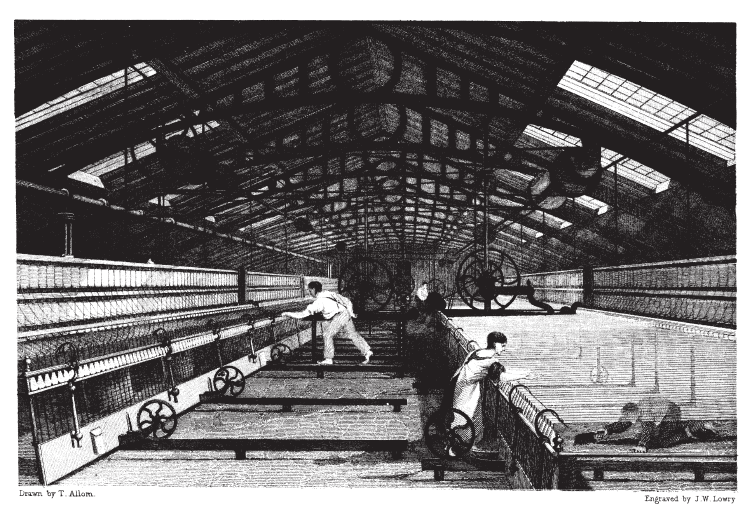
Children at work in a cotton mill in 1835

=== "Yorkshire Slavery" ===
In 1830 Oastler, a committed abolitionist, was visiting John Wood of Horton Hall near Bradford, one of the largest worsted spinners in the country. Whilst an existing (virtually un-enforceable) Factory Act specified a minimum age and maximum hours of work for children in cotton mills, it did not apply to other textile industries (such as: silk, flax, woollen and worsted (Note: The worsted industry, like the woollen industry, span and wove wool, but used long staple wool where the woollen industry used short staple wool – the two industries consequently differed in the manufacturing stages and technologies)). Wood, unhappy at the hours and conditions of work for children in Yorkshire worsted mills and his inability to persuade his competitors to ameliorate them, explained his concerns to Oastler and got him to promise to "remove from our factory system the cruelties which are practised in our mills". Oastler wrote the next day a letter to the Leeds Mercury the leading West Riding newspaper (Note: The Mercury vigorously supported the Whigs; Oastler was by now a Tory Ultra, but Oastler's father had been a close friend of the editor of the Mercury. In the dispute over tithes, Oastler had used the Mercury to respond to accounts in the Intelligencer favouring the vicar) contrasting speeches made at Yorkshire anti-slavery meetings with the treatment of children in Yorkshire factories – "Yorkshire Slavery":

Thousands of our fellow-creatures and fellow-subjects, both male and female, the miserable inhabitants of a Yorkshire town, (Yorkshire now represented in Parliament by the giant of anti-slavery principles) are this very moment existing in a state of slavery, more horrid than are the victims of that hellish system 'colonial slavery' These innocent creatures drawl out, unpitied, their short but miserable existence, in a place famed for its profession of religious zeal, whose inhabitants are ever foremost in professing 'temperance' and 'reformation' and are striving to outrun their neighbours in missionary exertions, and would fain send the Bible to the farthest corner of the globe aye, in the very place where the anti-slavery fever rages most furiously, her apparent charity is not more admired on earth, than her real cruelty is abhorred in Heaven. The very streets which receive the droppings of an 'Anti-Slavery Society' are every morning wet by the tears of innocent victims at the accursed shrine of avarice, who are compelled (not by the cart-whip of the negro slave-driver) but by the dread of the equally appalling thong or strap of the over-looker, to hasten, half-dressed, but not half-fed, to those magazines of British infantile slavery the worsted mills in the town and neighbourhood of Bradford!!!

After a fortnight's delay, the Mercury published the letter. This triggered correspondence; it became clear that other readers of the Mercury were also perturbed at conditions for children not only in the worsted industry, but also in other unregulated textile trades carried out in the West Riding. Oastler took up the cause of factory regulation. However, the millowners organised to resist any attempt to regulate their mills.

=== Halifax resolutions – breach with the Mercury ===
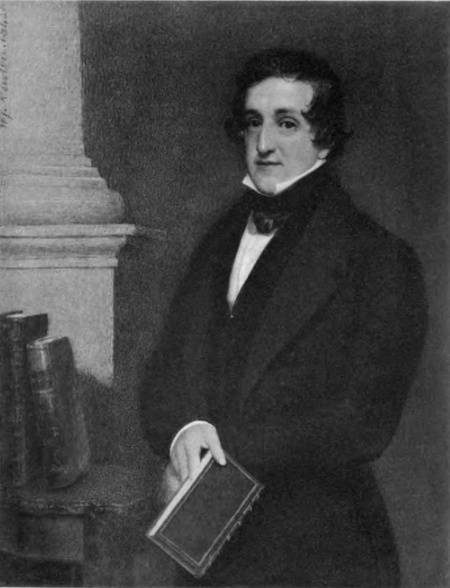
John Cam Hobhouse

In 1831, John Cam Hobhouse put forward a Bill to extend the Factory Act to other textile industries; Yorkshire millowners opposing the Bill met at Halifax and passed anti-Bill resolutions which the Mercury printed with an editorial endorsing the resolutions and opposing Hobhouse's Bill. Oastler wrote a long letter to the Mercury criticising the resolutions and reiterating the need for factory regulation. The Mercury printed his letter but omitted his detailed criticism of the resolutions, telling readers it had not printed the full letter because it 'outraged the judgement' and exceeded 'the bounds of reason and justice', objection being particularly taken to his 'brimstone rhetoric'. Oastler took great exception to this; the Leeds Intelligencer, the great (Tory) rival of the (Whig) Mercury was happy to print the letter in full, including such passages as:

Resolution 3 – attempts to persuade the public that if the manufacturers are not allowed to continue their present cruelties, the children will be starved and unemployed, and that, as these poor children are the main support of their strong and healthy parents, why, forsooth, the parents must starve too! That compelling the masters to treat their children better will REDUCE wages, and, what is very singular, will, at the same time RAISE THE PRICE of goods to the consumers. Thus destroying at one fell swoop the maker, the buyer, the consumer – both the home and foreign markets will be lost – the agricultural and landed proprietor ruined:- all this they say will be the consequences if poor little English children are protected from the cruelty and oppression of their worse than Egyptian task-masters. Happy England, whose very existence depends upon thy cruelty to infants! ... Self interest and avarice, and not necessity now goad thee on to ruin. England, beware! Let her inhabitants consider. They pretend to be Christians, and their God hath said – "If thou seest the oppression of the poor and violent perverting of judgement and justice in a province, marvel not at the matter: for he that is higher than the highest regardeth; and there be higher than they." "But it shall not be well with the wicked, neither shall he prolong his days." "Rob not the poor because he is poor, for the Lord will plead their cause and spoil the soul of those who spoil them" "Deliver the poor and needy, rid them out of the hand of the wicked." "If the poor curse thee in the bitterness of his soul, his prayer shall be heard of him that made him."" "A prayer out of a poor man's mouth reacheth to the ears of God, and his reproach cometh speedily." "He that oppresseth the poor reproacheth his maker.""

From this time forward, Oastler used the Intelligencer as the chief outlet for his letters. The Leeds Patriot, a Radical newspaper, commented favourably on the letter and gave Oastler its support on the issue.

=== 'Fixby Hall Compact' – common cause with the Radicals ===
Short Time Committees (predominantly (but not exclusively) organisations of millhands in which Radicals and trades unionists were prominent) had sprung up in the West Riding textile towns (and also in Lancashire) to secure Parliamentary legislation regulating the hours of work in textile mills (for children explicitly, and with the further aim that regulation would be by means which meant that adults worked the same hours). After Hobhouse's Bill was lost when a general election was precipitated by defeat of the Reform Bill, a deputation from the Huddersfield 'Short Time Committee' called on Oastler at Fixby and agreed with him (the 'Fixby Hall Compact'of 19 June 1831) to combine their efforts on the issue despite fundamental differences on other political issues.

=== 'The Factory King' ===
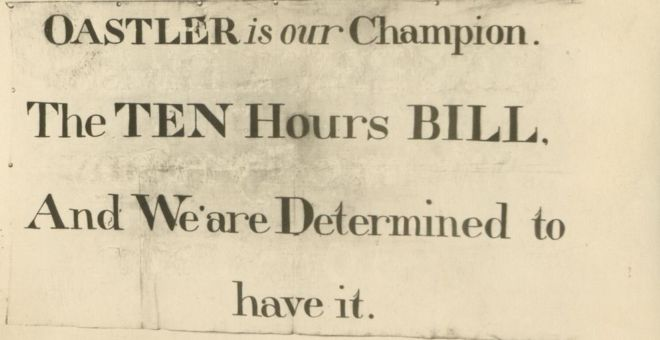
A banner used by Oastler's supporters.

Hobhouse reintroduced his Bill, but a combination of the pressure of parliamentary (Reform Bill) business and determined opposition by millowner MPs and MPs lobbied by millowners meant that although an Act was passed, it had lost virtually every significant provision in the original Bill. Michael Thomas Sadler, advised by Oastler, then introduced a 'Ten-Hour Bill' for which the Short Time Committees organised mass demonstrations of support. Oastler spoke at these meetings, soon showing himself to be "one of the most accomplished popular orators that ever addressed a large assembly of the working classes". At a monster demonstration by West Riding textile workers at York (Easter 1832) he said "We will have our Act, whatever Parliament will vote"; the Leeds Mercury seized upon this as showing even less respect than the King for the judgement of Parliament, and mockingly dubbed him 'King Richard' and hence 'the Factory King', a title Oastler was happy to accept. More significantly, Oastler urged his listeners that at future elections they should work for the return of (Note: not 'vote for': Textile workers had no vote before 1832 except in a few constituencies (such as Preston) with an unusually broad franchise; the Reform Bill of 1832 made electoral qualifications uniform and set them at levels beyond the reach of textile workers) candidates supporting a ten-hour bill, whatever their other political views. Sadler's bill failed to complete its passage through the Commons before Parliament was dissolved Thornhill (Oastler's employer) had had no objection to Oastler campaigning for factory reform, but intervened when told that at Huddersfield (where no Tory was standing in the 1832 election) Oastler was working for the return of a Radical.

=== Althorp's Act (1833)- the ten-hour movement outflanked ===
Sadler failed to be elected to Parliament, (Note: as did Captain Wood, the Radical candidate at Huddersfield) and Parliament decided that a Factory Commission should make a thorough investigation of the matter to provide a sound basis for any further factory legislation. The Short Time movement saw no need for further investigation and Lord Ashley – now the champion of factory reform in the Commons – introduced another Ten-Hour Bill without waiting for the commission's report. The short time committees of the textile districts organised mass demonstrations for a Ten-Hour Act, the rhetoric becoming more heated ("Tt is a question of blood against gold. Infants' blood has been sold for nought, but if we are despised now., it shall be a question of blood in another sense" Oastler told a vast demonstration at Wibsey Low Moor at the start of July) as the aim was no longer seen to be convincing the public of the need for factory reform, but rather deterring the government from using the commission to avoid any meaningful reform. They attempted to organise a boycott of the commission and to ensure that wherever the Commissioners went in the textile districts they were met with large demonstrations for a Ten-Hour Bill, and against the Commissioners. Oastler was the 'centre of communication' for the organisation, and prominent in the agitation against the commission. When the commission's report came out, it recommended an eight-hour day for children under thirteen, with a declared aim of allowing mills to operate sixteen hours a day by a 'relay system' employing two sets of children. This addressed the issue of child labour on which the short time movement had been able to gain public sympathy without giving any restriction on adult hours of work. Despite winning a number of Parliamentary votes, Ashley was unable to secure a majority for key clauses in his Bill, and withdrew it, leaving the way open for Lord Althorp to pilot through a Factory Act in line with the Commission recommendations.
The 1833 Factory Act was unsatisfactory not merely to the Ten-Hour movement but to all interested parties. Members of the government had openly described Althorp's Act as 'an evil forced upon the Government'. Mill-owners (whether reconciled to the principle of state intervention or not) objected that the textile districts did not have the significant pool of unemployed children needed for a 'relay system': it was therefore virtually impossible to attempt to comply with the Act. Furthermore, mill-owner magistrates, who had been barred from hearing cases brought under the previous Factory Acts, were allowed to hear cases under the 1833 Act, which they saw no point in enforcing: only if non-compliance came to the attention of a Factory Inspector (given powers to act as a magistrate by the Act) was there any prospect of a successful prosecution

=== Blackburn speech of 1836 ===
Oastler's agitation for a Ten-Hour Act having failed, he was temporarily swept aside in favour of a Society for Promoting National Regeneration, the brainchild of John Doherty and Robert Owen, which aimed to secure an eight-hour day by concerted strike action but failed to organise a general strike of textile workers (partly because of pre-emptive anti-union action by millowners). Another Ten-Hour Bill was now contemplated for 1836, but was pre-empted by a government Bill to weaken the existing Act by reducing the age up to which only an eight-hour day could be worked to twelve. Oastler played a prominent part in agitation against the government Bill and for the introduction of a revived Ten-Hour Bill. The government Bill was withdrawn after it secured a majority of only two at Second Reading; the campaign for a Ten-Hour Act continued, but was seriously set back by a speech Oastler made at Blackburn in September 1836. The Blackburn Standard (a friend of the Ten-Hour Bill) published only an expurgated account of the meeting at which Oastler spoke, preceding it with an editorial in which they deplored the speeches of him and his fellow orators:

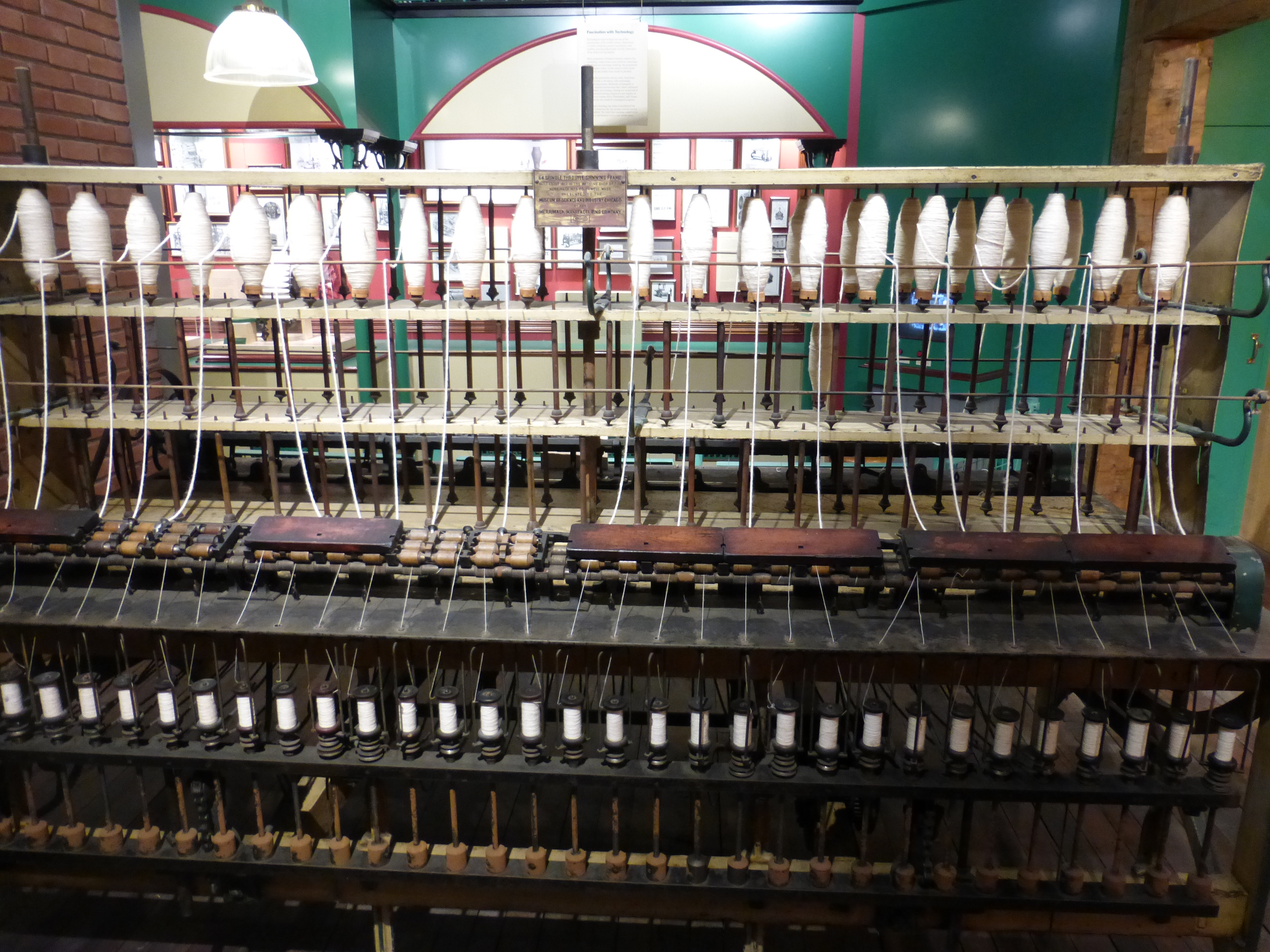
A throstle frame – when running at speed vulnerable to a knitting needle

Such of the sentiments to which they gave utterance, as we deem safe to publish, we report at some length in other columns, but we must say, that they delivered a vast deal of empty, impudent, nonsensical, mischievous, and disgusting balderdash, which we consider it to be our duty to exclude altogether from the Standard. ... we much regret that the management of this important ... measure should have fallen into the hands of these injudicious advocates. We do not hesitate to aver that they have, in one night, done more injury to the cause of the factory operatives in this town, by the disgraceful advice which they tendered to their hearers ... than the true friends of the people can repair by the most strenuous attention for many months. It is not surprising that Christian ministers decline to join in a crusade where the leaders are utterly devoid of Christian charity, and reckless of the consequences of their violence

The Standard therefore did not report that Oastler had talked of teaching children to sabotage mill machinery,; this was however seized upon by his opponents such as the Manchester Guardian (Note: Not then the high-minded liberal institution of its latter years : a rival Manchester paper described it as a "foul prostitute and dirty parasite of the worst portion of mill-owners") which urged that either 'his friends should put him under some restraint' or 'the law should interpose to end the career of wickedness which he seems disposed to run'. In a justificatory letter to the Guardian Oastler said that he was only advocating sabotage where (as at Blackburn) magistrates were denying justice to factory children by openly refusing to enforce the Factory Act. "If after this your magistrates should refuse to listen to your complaints under the factory act and again refer you to me, bring with you your children and tell them to ask their grandmothers for a few of their old knitting needles which I will instruct them how to apply to the spindles in a way which will teach these law-defying mill owner magistrates to have respect even to 'Oastler's law* as they have wrongly designated the factory law."

This caused widespread outrage and the rupture of relationships with Ashley and Wood (Note: Driver says the rupture with Wood was permanent, and they never communicated again. In 1836 Wood moved to Theddon Grange, Alton and was no longer actively involved in the textile trade or West Riding affairs. The Fleet Papers record a donation by Wood of £100 to the Oastler Liberty Fund which seems to have been originally given to the 'Oastler Testimonial Fund in 1838. 'I know that he still remembers me: I guess why he no longer seeks my company. ... my old friend Wood is ashamed of me.' said Oastler in 1840) the Leeds Intelligencer ceased to publish his letters : John Fielden however stood by him . Oastler's health broke down at the end of 1836; a meeting at Manchester in January 1837 was told he was unable to address it as 'his exertions on behalf of the factory slave had brought him to the edge of the grave'

== 'The fiend-begotten ...new Poor Law' ==
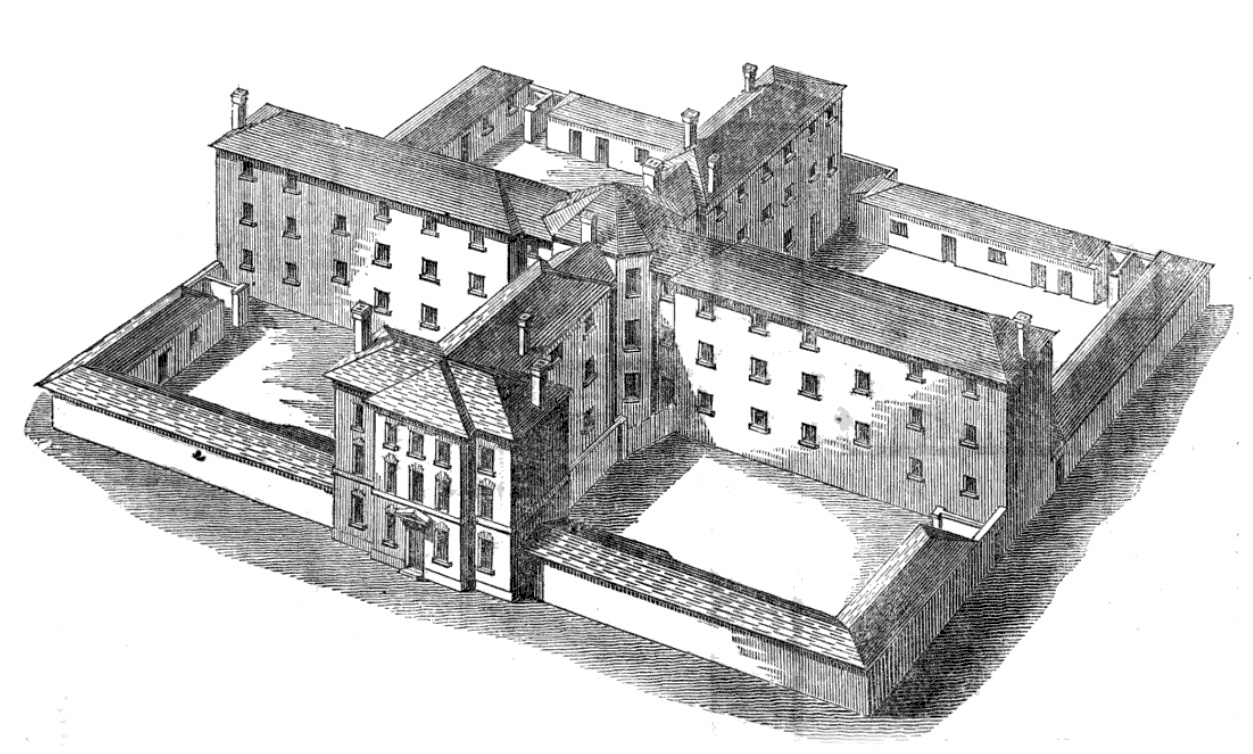
A 'Poor Law Bastille': 1835 model design of a workhouse to hold 300 paupers

Less than a fortnight later, though, he was back in action at a mass meeting in Huddersfield, but in a new cause : delivering a speech (subsequently published under the (representative) title of Damnation! Eternal damnation to the fiend-begotten 'coarser-food', new Poor Law !) urging resistance to implementation of the 'New Poor Law'. In the preface to this speech, Oastler denounced the Poor Law Amendment Act as an unjust, unChristian measure, declaring

CHRISTIAN READER Be not alarmed at the sound of the Title. I cannot bless that which GOD and NATURE CURSE. The Bible being true, the Poor Law Amendment Act is false! The Bible contains the will of God-this accursed Act of Parliament embodies the will of Lucifer. It is the sceptre of Belial, establishing its sway in the land of Bibles!! DAMNATION; ETERNAL DAMNATION TO THE ACCURSED FIEND!

=== The Poor Law Amendment Act ===
Alarmed at the cost of poor relief in the southern agricultural districts of England (where in many areas it had become a semi-permanent top-up of labourers' wages – the 'allowance system', 'Roundsman system', or 'Speenhamland system') Parliament had set up a Royal Commission into the operation of the Poor Laws. Its report had recommended sweeping changes:

- Out-relief should cease – relief should be given only in workhouses, and upon such terms that only the truly indigent would accept it.
- Different classes of paupers (men, women, boys, girls; able-bodied, infirm) should be segregated "the separation of man and wife was necessary, in order to ensure the proper regulation of workhouses"
- There should be a central board with powers to specify standards of pauper treatment and to enforce those standards; this could not be done directly by Parliament because of the legislative workload that would ensue.

The ensuing Poor Law Amendment Act set up a three-man Poor Law Commission, an 'at arms' length' quango to which Parliament delegated the power to make appropriate regulations, without making any provision for effective oversight of the commission's doings. Local poor-rates payers still elected their local Board of Poor Law Guardians and still paid for local poor law provisions, but those provisions could be specified to the Board of Guardians by the Poor Law Commission; where they were the views of the local rate-payers were irrelevant. The Act was passed by large majorities, despite Oastler personally lobbying Tory leaders (including the Duke of Wellington) to oppose it. Oastler's objections were that the Act pursued aims dictated by political economy by un-Christian treatment of the poor (and particularly of the married poor: "whom God hath joined together let no man part asunder"), and to ensure this was done with consistent heartlessness was setting up an unconstitutional body. Oastler told the Duke "if that Bill passes, the man who can produce the greatest confusion in the country will be the greatest patriot, and I will try to be that man". The chairman of the commission was Sir Thomas Frankland Lewis, an exact contemporary of Thornhill at Eton

=== Resistance to the New Poor Law ===
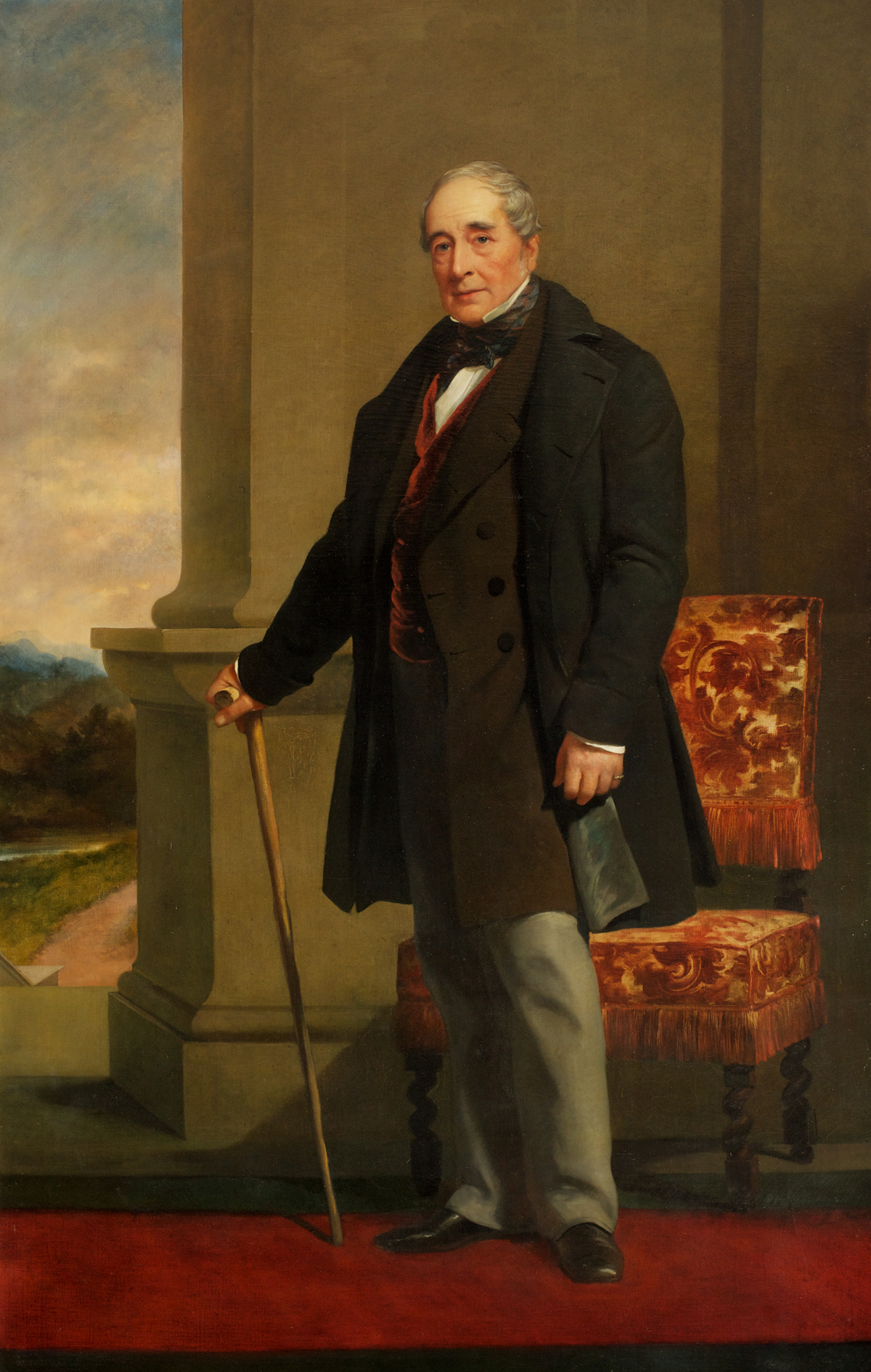
One of the 'Somerset House Despots': Sir Thomas Frankland Lewis, (Chairman of Poor Law Commission 1834–39: at Eton with Oastler's employer 1792–98)

The new dispensation was implemented progressively, starting with the southern counties of England, where it achieved a considerable reduction in the poor rates. Not until January 1837 were the first steps taken to introduce the system into the West Riding by setting up 'poor law unions' and electing Boards of Guardians for them. The Poor Law Boards were then to appoint a clerk to administer whatever system of relief was specified for that Union by the central Commission. The Commission intended (or said they intended) to allow the new Poor Law Boards in manufacturing areas to continue out-relief, but opponents of the New Poor Law held that best way to defend out-relief was to prevent new Poor Law Boards being established (or clerks to Poor Law Boards being appointed), since their existence would greatly facilitate the cessation of out-relief should the Commission change its mind (or not be telling the truth). Short Time Committee men played a prominent part in organising protest meetings, disruption of Poor Law Board meetings (Keighley, Huddersfield) and/or election of anti- Poor Law 'Poor Law Guardians' (Huddersfield).

A meeting of Fixby rate-payers agreed to take no part in the election of a Poor Law Guardian; Thornhill instructed his tenants (through Oastler) that they should. Oastler passed on the instruction, but wrote back to Thornhill defending opposition to the appointment of guardians, concluding his letter "But it is no use my writing about these matters -you cannot understand me. My living is in your hands – my conscience is my own." Oastler played little active part in the resistance until May. In April–May 1837, he campaigned on the Ten-Hour Bill and the Poor Law "a gross & wicked law .. if it was truth, the Bible was a lie" at a by-election in Huddersfield, but was defeated by 50 votes by the Whig candidate.

Oastler was a leading light in a series of intimidatory pickets of meetings of the Huddersfield Guardians. Violence at the third of these (in June) went beyond anything Oastler intended or would countenance (when the guardians refused to receive a deputation, demonstrators stormed the workhouse building and dispersed the meeting; when the meeting reconvened at a local hotel stones were thrown through the windows) but the crowd ignored Oastler's appeals to disperse, and Oastler had to personally shield the parish officers. The (Tory) Huddersfield magistrates threatened to read the Riot Act. (Note: Which in the short term would have been an empty gesture with a real risk of making matters worse; there were no military immediately available to assist the civil power, since – accepting Oastler's assurances about the conduct of the demonstration- the magistrates had not asked for military assistance. A similar attempt to intimidate the Poor Law Guardians in Bradford in November was countered by the presence of cavalry, but the crowd did not disperse when the Riot Act was read, instead attacking the cavalry. Reinforcements had to be summoned from Burnley before any attempt could be made to escort the guardians away from their abandoned meeting; when this was done serious consequences were averted only by infantry firing on the mob – there were many injuries but (fortunately) no deaths) but did not do so. A fresh election was held in July (Parliament automatically being dissolved on the death of King William IV); Oastler stood again at Huddersfield, and was again defeated by 22 votes by a different Whig opponent. When Oastler fell behind in the poll, a mob attacked the hustings and polling had to be suspended: the Riot Act was read and the cavalry called out to restore order. At the subsequent West Riding hustings at Wakefield, Oastler and a contingent from Huddersfield were prominent in the fighting between Whig and anti-Whig forces in which two people died.

At the start of May 1838, Oastler suffered another collapse. Whilst he was recovering, Thornhill dismissed him. Thornhill's letter noted that Oastler had become steward on the basis that this was a full-time job and complained that Oastler had not attended to estate affairs as Thornhill would have wished, but did not go into further details. Despite his convalescence and his dismissal, Oastler continued his activities as a polemicist (e.g. his open letter to Earl Fitzwilliam) and an orator. Lord Howick had dismissed petitions against the New Poor Law on the grounds that they came largely from areas where the new law was not yet in operation; the true views of the agricultural labourers in the areas where it had been applied was approbation as shown by agrarian unrest being much less than in 1830. Oastler responded in a speech in Halifax in July; telling his audience that there was little point in petitioning: the agricultural labourers had petitioned and government had laughed at them; they were now arming secretly. That could only lead to assassinations; better by far to arm openly, as was their right; the government and the poor law administrators would then treat them more civilly: "I would recommend you, every one, before next Saturday night, to have a brace of horse pistols, a good sword and a musket, and to hang them up on your mantelpieces (not by any means to use them). They will petition for you" As with the Blackburn speech, this alarmed and alienated moderate support.

The Anti-Poor Law agitation was however rapidly overtaken and supplanted as the great working-class Radical cause by the more sweeping Chartist movement, (whose constitutional program Oastler did not support); when that collapsed in 1839 (with the failure of the National Petition and a Government crackdown with many leaders arrested and charged with seditious speeches and involvement in unlawful assemblies), so did organised resistance to the New Poor Law. Many of Oastler's associates were involved in Chartism, and Oastler did not disown them: he played a prominent part in raising funds for the defence of J R Stephens; his last public campaigning for 5 years.

== Imprisonment for debt ==
The prosecution of Chartist leaders did not include Oastler because, as Lord John Russell told the House of Commons, the Anti-Poor Law agitation "was of a nature very difficult to meet by any execution of the laws of the country; for it was not applied to any purposes for the overturning of the institutions or the laws of the country or any particular political purpose; but pretended solely to an exclusive regard for the interests of the poorer classes, and whatever could be done for their benefit." Nonetheless, Oastler was to spend over three years in prison.

=== Previous difficulties with Thornhill ===
By Oastler's own account, (Note: Thornhill's Cowes letter (together with letters exchanged in 1834 and read out in court in July 1840) is the only glimpse of his view of the affair other than the one supported by his legal advisers; that Oastler owed money, and Thornhill wanted it; consequently any attempt to go into detail has to be based upon the ex parte statements of Oastler such as his speech on quitting Fixby, the more detailed account in, the details given (mixed in with much other matter) in the series of letters "To the People of Yorkshire" from Oastler published in the Northern Star in the summer of 1840 and his final version given in the Fleet Papers) there had been past disagreements between him and Thornhill. Fixby was entailed, and would not be inherited by Thornhill's children (including his only son) by his first wife but by his daughter by a second marriage. (Note: Thornhill had jilted the daughter of a neighbouring (poorer) landowner (Delia Walker of Walterclough Hall), and had instead (in the contemporary euphemism) "taken under his protection" another man's wife. He eventually married her after her husband's death; their son was by then in his teens (and legally the son of the first husband). Oastler alluded to this rarely and in the vaguest of terms "My master had, many years before I entered on his service, for reasons which until further provoked, I shall forbear to name, exiled himself from the hall of his forefathers": however, he commented unfavourably on a number of occasions on absentee landlords amusing themselves with racehorses and gambling, sometimes explicitly applying that description to Thornhill (whom it would fit)(http://www.anatpro.com/index_files/Eleanor_Frances_Thornhill.htm).) Thornhill therefore wished to maximise the profits from Fixby and use them to build up his unentailed properties (worth roughly £22,000 a year) which his son could inherit. Oastler, however, administered Fixby less in accordance with Thornhill's wishes than with the former practice of Thornhill's father: he would not employ labourers at less than a living wage, nor let farms at rents too high to allow the tenant's prosperity; callers at Fixby on estate business were offered a drink, and their horses were stabled. In 1834, accusations/advice by third parties led Thornhill to dismiss his sub-agent at Calverley for dishonesty. Oastler thought this unjustified (and was aggrieved that his views had not been sought); he therefore prepared to offer his resignation. In doing so he drew up accounts which showed that the expenses he had considered necessary to maintain the good name of Fixby and of Thornhill exceeded his salary; Oastler was indebted to the estate by over £2,700. Thornhill had not at the time seen this as implying any dishonesty and had refused Oastler's resignation and increased his salary (but advised greater economy in future, and secured a promissory note from Oastler for the £2,700). By July 1837, despite Oastler's election campaigns and his anti-Poor Law activities, the debt was under £1750.

=== From dismissal to prison ===
Oastler had previously told other anti-Poor Law campaigners that Frankland Lewis was urging Thornhill to sack him, and his dismissal was described in various sympathetic papers as "the rewards of independent resistance of Whig tyranny". Placards advertising a procession to pay tribute to Oastler as he left Fixby (August 1838) offended Thornhill; he wrote a letter for publication saying that Oastler had been sacked, not because of his anti-Poor Law activities, but "because he converted my money to his own use, and paid so little attention to my concerns and his duty that the persons employed under him have cheated me" Thornhill's letter was written at Cowes (17 August 1838) and hence without the knowledge of his legal adviser, who (once shown it) persuaded Thornhill to instead send to the papers a letter (also dated as from Cowes, 17 August) saying that Oastler had been sacked because he owed Thornhill money and was devoting his efforts to politics, rather than repaying the debt. (Note: During the campaign of the Oastler Liberation Committee in 1843 speakers of all political affiliations and none (including his vicar, an old schoolfriend, and Baines of the Leeds Mercury) all spoke highly of his honesty and humanity) Through the incompetence of Oastler's successor as steward of Fixby both letters were published in (different) Yorkshire papers. "He found he had gone too far, and having by his first letter dug a pit for his reputation, he writes another by way of putting a tombstone on it" said Oastler, but his promissory note put him at Thornhill's mercy.

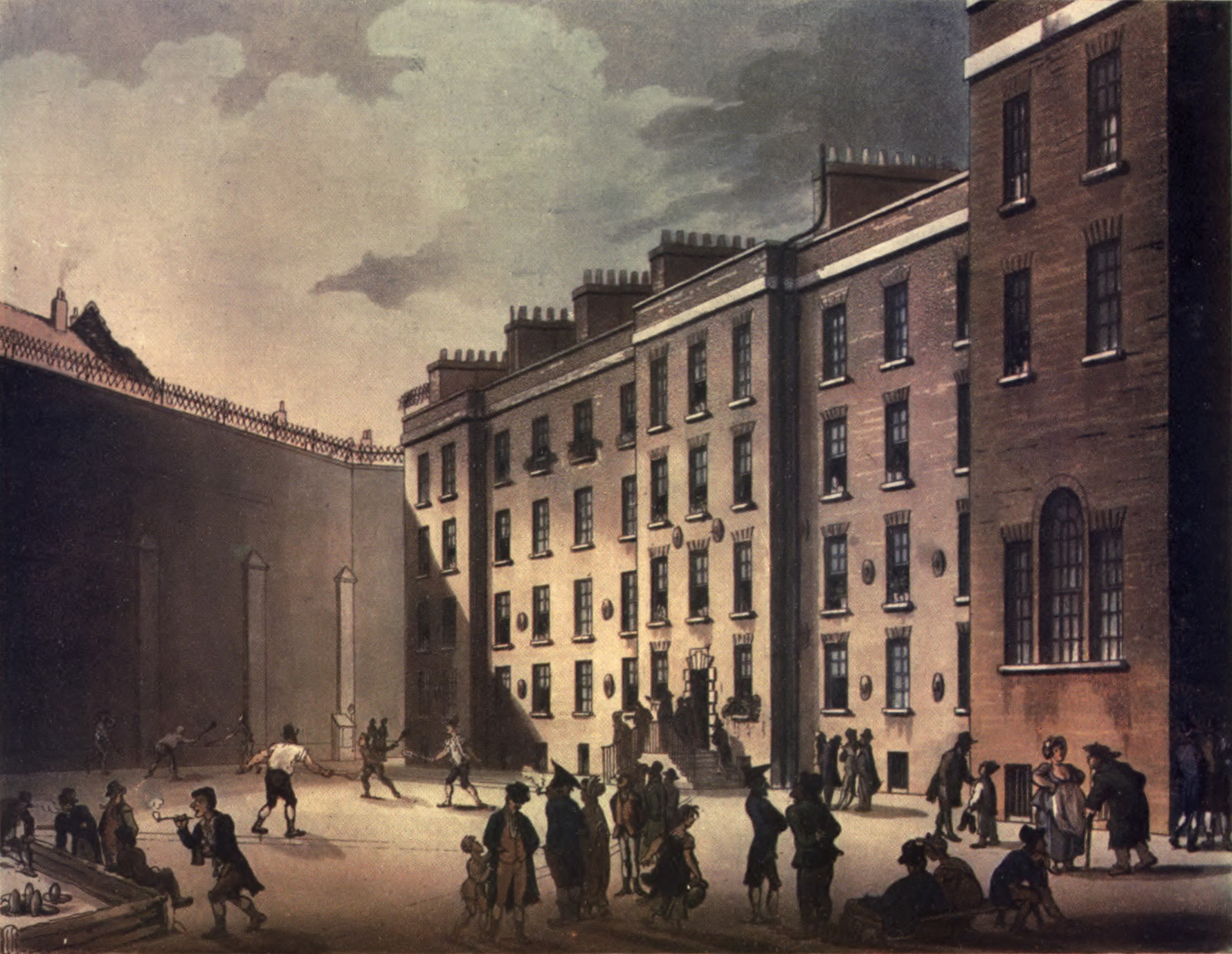
Inside the Fleet Prison

Thornhill went to law for prompt payment of the full sum due; he did so in Middlesex because he thought a Yorkshire jury would be prejudiced. In January 1839 Oastler failed to have the case heard in Yorkshire; at this stage Oastler intended his defence to involve all the estate business during Oastler's stewardship, and Oastler anticipated calling about 60 Yorkshire-based witnesses. Thornhill repeatedly postponed the action, which was not heard until July 1840. After the opening statement of Thornhill's counsel, Oastler said if his honesty was not being questioned he was prepared to settle. The Lord Chief Justice assured Oastler that there was no suggestion of dishonesty (Thornhill's counsel said only there had been no suggestion of dishonesty in the material he had laid before the court); (Note: but Driver notes that he later befriended Oastler and interceded (unsuccessfully) with Thornhill on his behalf, and that this helped dispel any suspicion that there had been damning evidence against Oastler held in reserve) there was an agreed verdict that Oastler owed Thornhill £2600. He was unable to pay this: Thornhill's lawyer indicated that any indication that Oastler was prepared to declare himself bankrupt (under the Relief of Insolvent Debtors Act) if faced with debtors' prison would avoid any move to put him there, but Oastler scorned this and was imprisoned for debt in the Fleet Prison (Dec 1840). (Note: In the absence of any evidence of the reason for Thornhill's actions Driver ventures a 'surmise' that the Poor Law Commission and the Whigs were behind them; he gives no more details e.g. on why imprisonment was delayed. Oastler linked his dismissal to Thornhill's friendship with a Poor Law Commissioner but in his imprisonment he saw the hand of Thornhill's close advisers (and in particular the Vicar of Calverley): 'You are not cruel, Sir – you are very proud, and most easily worked upon by those in whom you confide' – and behind them the will of God, who would allow his release only when Oastler had used his imprisonment to purge himself of anger against his adversaries)

=== Fleet Papers ===
Oastler's imprisonment brought reconciliation with former allies who had broken with him, and visits and gifts not only from his supporters from every class but also from political opponents who thought Thornhill's conduct oppressive. Various intercessions on his behalf with Thornhill were fruitless; to a resolution passed by a Leeds meeting Thornhill replied "that I have no enmity towards Mr Oastler, but that after the treatment I have received from him, I cannot in justice to myself, or my family, set him at liberty, without security for his debt to me." In prison Oastler wrote (weekly) his "Fleet Papers", ostensibly letters addressed to Thornhill reviewing current political affairs, published and sold for 2d per issue . This was the only means by which he could earn money, and the only way he could continue to resist the advances of 'political economy': "I can only now aid by my pen; but I will strive to do the duty of an Englishman, and, "whether they will hear or they will forbear," I will warn the people of the danger to which the Liberal schemes of the self-styled Free-trading Philosophers must eventually lead them.". Mixed with current politics were explanations of past events in his life and accounts of visits and gifts by sympathisers and well-wishers, and of life in the Fleet. A contrast with Thornhill's lifestyle was always lurking, and sometimes made. (Note: In 1841, whilst Thornhill was holding a lavish house party at Riddlesworth after the Newmarket October Meeting, Oastler and a fellow inmate were busy persuading his cell chimney to 'draw': when a deputation of Short-Time Committee men called on him to relate their recent discussions with the Prime Minister; "we must get this job finished, let them talk whilst we proceed" responded Oastler. By such trifles, Oastler writes to Thornhill, "it will be manifest how we are each endeavouring to perform our several duties to ourselves, our generation, and our common country.")

=== Oastler ransomed ===
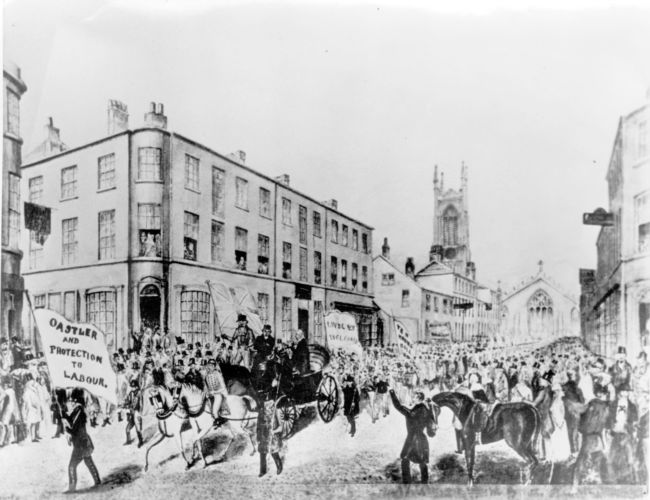
Oastler returning from prison.

When Oastler was dismissed, an 'Oastler Testimonial Fund' had been inaugurated, intended to raise enough money to provide an adequate income for Oastler. This had not been successful, and on Oastler's imprisonment transformed itself into an 'Oastler Liberation Fund'; this initially also stalled well short of its target (Note: Driver points out that the Oastler appeal was effectively competing with appeals to raise money for the defence of Chartist prisoners, and for the support of their families) until relaunched in the summer of 1843 by an editorial in The Times, followed by fund-raising meetings held across the factory districts and reported nationally. As with the gifts to Oastler in the Fleet, donations to the liberation fund came from across the political spectrum. By January 1844, over £2000 had been raised, but the debt had risen to nearly £3200 and there were concerns about Oastler's health. To secure his release, wealthy supporters guaranteed the shortfall, and Oastler was released in February 1844. On Shrove Tuesday 1844, a procession and meeting to mark his liberation were held at Huddersfield; he told the meeting that he now had no animosity towards his opponents, and that violent language was no longer necessary; the press and the public now fully supported further factory legislation and reform of the New Poor Law.

== After prison ==
Oastler, initially recuperating at a nephew's country house, was soon drawn into a series of public meetings agitating for a Ten-Hour Bill, in the aftermath of the Government asserting that millworkers no longer wished for a Ten-Hour Act and making the retention of a twelve-hour limit in the 1844 Factory Act a question of confidence. He was now only a support speaker, and his speeches kept to the less violent tone promised at his Huddersfield homecoming.

In July 1844, having been advised by his Liberation Committee that money was not forthcoming to support him in public life, he advertised himself in Leeds papers as "Umpire, Arbitrator, Agent for the Purchase or Sale of Estates, and for Obtaining or Opposing Private Bills in Parliament". He was a Leeds sharebroker in 1845, by 1846 he was working in a London stockbroking office; in 1849 he was made bankrupt. (Note: Driver does not mention this, saying instead that the firm Oastler was working for went bankrupt when he was housebound by illness (circa 1847-9). From 1846 to his bankruptcy Oastler worked for Thomas Allsop (a stockbroker of Chartist sympathies) who continued to trade as a stockbroker into the 1850s, failing in 1851) Thereafter, Oastler was discreetly supported by his friends; from 1851 he edited a periodical The Home but this was never a paying proposition and closed in 1855.

In the autumn of 1846 he was summoned from retirement, by the West Riding Short-Time Committee, to be the principal speaker at public meetings to demonstrate the millworkers' continuing support for a Ten-Hour Act; following this he undertook a similar speaking tour of textile areas in Scotland. The Ten Hours' Act was passed in 1847, but Oastler continued to be relied upon as a spokesman for the Short Time movement, pressing for full implementation of the Act and the outlawing of the 'false relay system'; he supported the unsuccessful opposition to the 1850 'Compromise Act', accusing Lord Ashley of "betraying the poor". He continued to argue for Protection, and against Free Trade and the "Manchester School", but his appearances at Short Time meetings were now to receive congratulatory addresses, to reminisce, and to pay tribute to former colleagues in the struggle. After an 'alarming illness' at the start of 1861, he recovered sufficiently to again visit Yorkshire to see old friends, but was taken ill en route near Harrogate (8 August 1861) (Note: Driver (unreliable on such minutiae) has him passing through Harrogate on his way to Bradford from his home in Surrey. Contemporary newspapers show that Oastler was by now living at Conwy, where he suffered his alarming illness, had convalesced at the home of a nephew at Scarborough, before visiting a relative of the nephew near Darlington, and was on his way from there to Bradford when taken ill at Starbeck) and died there a fortnight later. He was buried in the family vault at Kirkstall, Leeds: he had asked for a simple and private funeral, but many of his old Short Time comrades attended and at their insistence the coffin was carried by twelve factory workers.

== Memorials ==
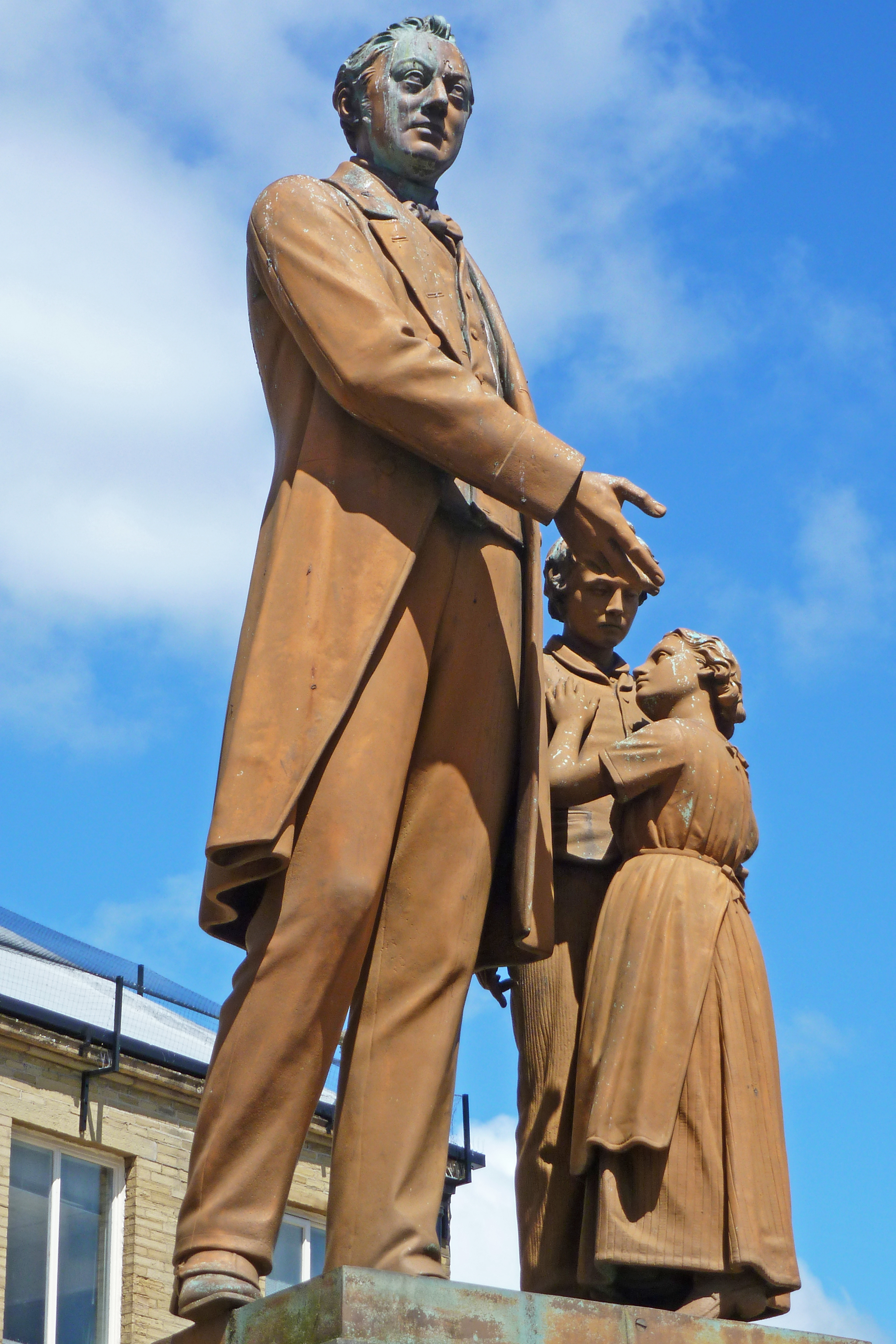
A statue of Richard Oastler in Oastler Square, Bradford.

At the nadir of Oastler's fortunes in 1840, the Leeds Intelligencer told its readers "Important religious, moral, and social consequences have been the fruits of his herculean labours, and it is probable that posterity will decree him a statue". After Oastler's death a national subscription was raised for a permanent memorial to Oastler. The Intelligencer, supporting this, noted that the Ten Hour Act had been so beneficial that it could not serve as that memorial. The ten-hour day was now accepted as normal and proper: consequently it was now passing from remembrance that "the agitation in favour of it was by no means well received, and the struggle that won it was a hard one".

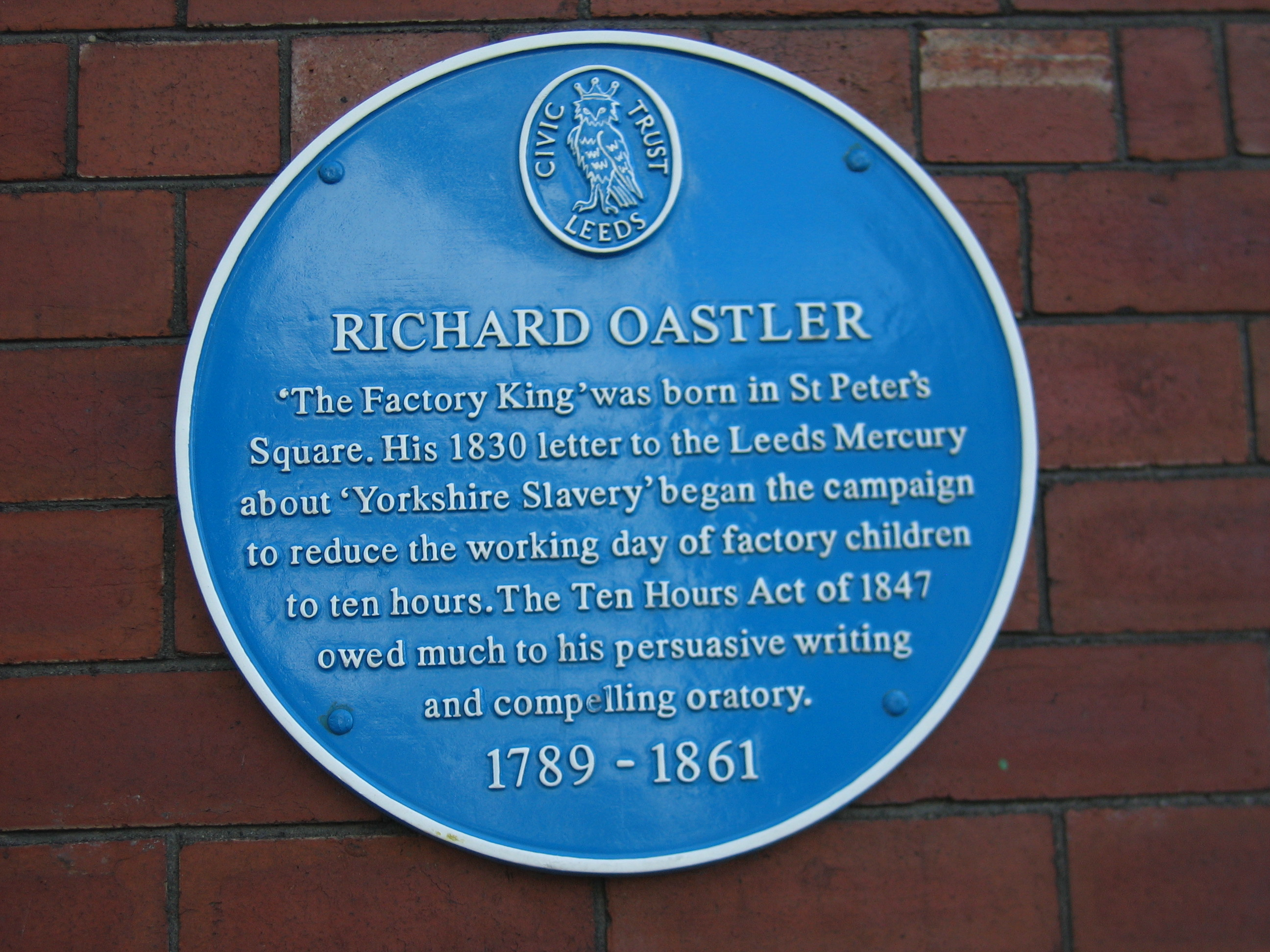
A plaque commemorating Oastler, in Leeds.

The money to erect a statue was raised (somewhat delayed by the Cotton Famine) and the West Riding town in which the statue was to be erected was voted for by subscribers, Bradford being the overwhelming preference. The statue was unveiled in Forster Square, Bradford (in front of the railway station) on Whit Saturday 1869 by the former Lord Ashley, now Lord Shaftesbury. Church bells were rung and all places of business in Bradford were shut for the occasion. It was estimated that the preliminary procession had involved about 30,000; the crowds at the ceremony and along the procession route totalling over 100,000. The figures, sculpted by John Birnie Philip, were cast from three tons of bronze and cost £1,500. A public house (previously a chapel) in Park Street Market, Brighouse, and a school in the Armley district of Leeds, West Yorkshire, also bears his name, as does a building on the University of Huddersfield's Queensgate campus.
