= St John the Evangelist, Bierley =

Church in Bradford, West Yorkshire, England

Coordinates: 53°46′14″N 1°43′57″W

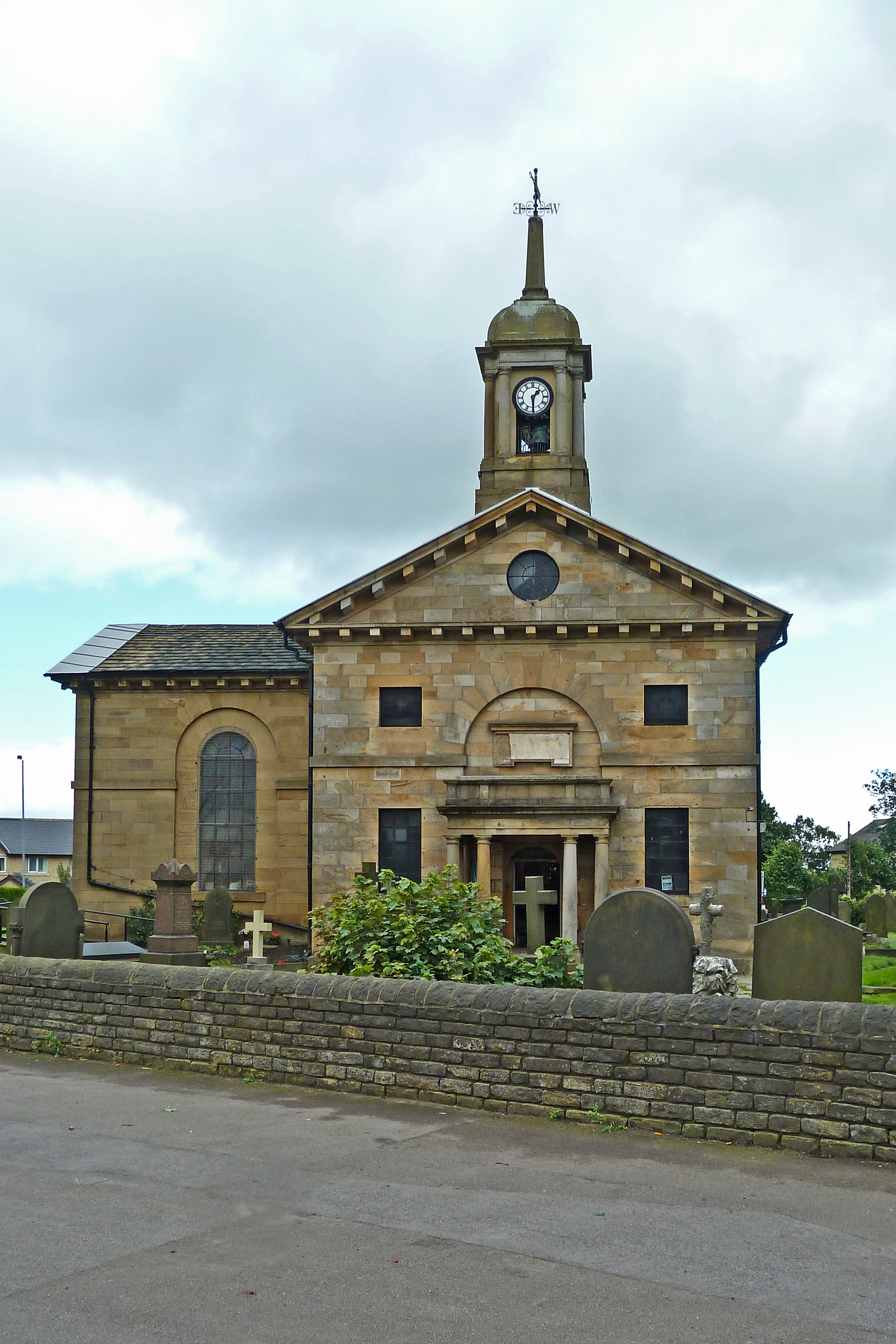
St John the Evangelist church

The Church of St John the Evangelist is a Grade II* listed church situated in what is now the City of Bradford, in Yorkshire, England. A private chapel was constructed here in 1766, which later became a chapel of ease of the Church of England, usually known as Bierley Chapel. That was a misnomer in the sense that it lay not in the Bierley township, but in neighbouring Bowling; the name came from the North Bierley estate to which it was originally attached. In the middle of the 19th century it became a parish church with the current name.

== History ==
To the north of Bierley, it was built in 1766 by John Carr as an estate chapel for Richard Richardson (1708–1781) of Bierley Hall. It was consecrated in 1824. In 1828 and 1831 it was enlarged, when the north transept and a west porch were added. A parish was attached to it in 1864. It is now a Grade II* listed building.

=== Chaplains to 1824 ===
These included:

- 1767–c.1772 James Stillingfleet (1741–1826)
- c.1772–c.1781 M. Ollerenshaw
- From 1781, a number of chaplains (J. West and D. West, Dr. Bailey and his brother, William Wood of Tingley)
- 1787–c.1799 Thomas Wade
- 1799–1823 a number of chaplains (Balmforth, Booth, Gill, Morgan, Heslop, Grainger, Hollist, Barmby, Parkin, Johnson, Weddell, Clarkson and Beaumont).

=== 1824–1867 ===
Incumbents included:

- 1824 J. B. Cartwright
- 1826 George Stringer Bull
- 1839 John Barber

=== From 1868 ===
- 1868 C. W. N. Hyne
- 1912 Harold Joseph Rose Firth
- 1923 Arthur Frederic White
- 1938 Bernard Markham
- 1946 Leslie Anniss Pickett
- 1953 Reginald Stanley Landsdown
- 1961 Kenneth Targett
- 1964 Robert Coverdale Moorsom
- 1971 Hubert Tours Annear
- 1976 Geoffrey Edward Millar (1976-1991 Priest in Charge)
- 1991 Iain Robert Lane
- 2000 Vacancy
- 2002 Kevin Tromans
- 2008 David Kennedy
- 2015 Vacancy
- 2018 Paul Wheelhouse
