= English Poor Laws =

Laws regarding poverty in England, 16th–19th century

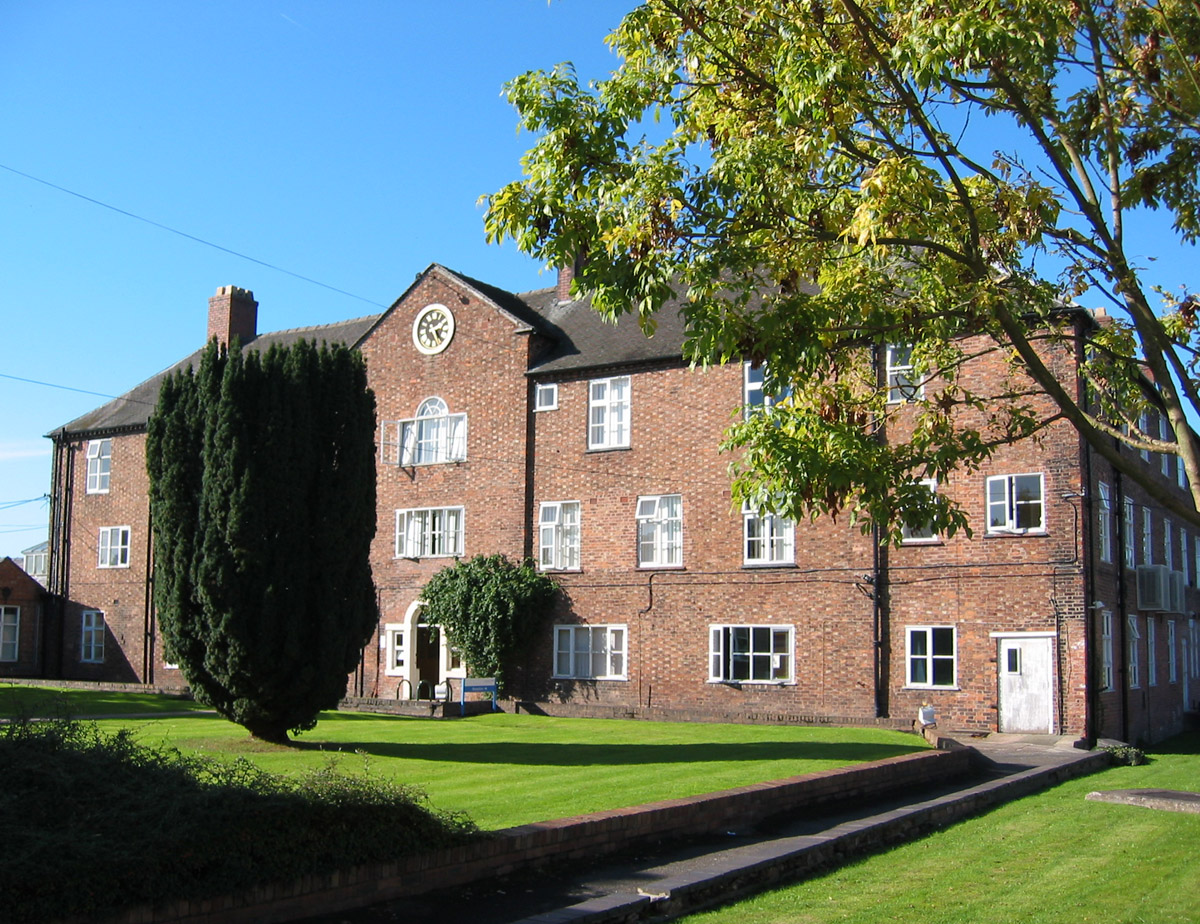
Although many deterrent workhouses developed in the period after the New Poor Law, some had already been built under the existing system. This workhouse in Nantwich, Cheshire, dates from 1780.

The English Poor Laws were a system of poor relief in England and Wales that developed out of the codification of late-medieval and Tudor-era laws in 1512–1598. The system continued until the modern welfare state emerged in the late 1940s.

English Poor Law legislation can be traced back as far as 1536, when legislation was passed to deal with the impotent poor, although there were much earlier Plantagenet laws dealing with the problems caused by vagrants and beggars. The history of the Poor Law in England and Wales is usually divided between two statutes: the Old Poor Law passed during the reign of Elizabeth I (1558–1603) and the New Poor Law, passed in 1834, which significantly modified the system of poor relief. The New Poor Law altered the system from one which was administered haphazardly at a local parish level to a highly centralised system which encouraged the large-scale development of workhouses by poor law unions.

The Poor Law system fell into decline at the beginning of the 20th century owing to factors such as the introduction of the Liberal welfare reforms and the availability of other sources of assistance from friendly societies and trade unions, as well as piecemeal reforms which bypassed the Poor Law system. The Poor Law system was not formally abolished until the National Assistance Act 1948 (11 & 12 Geo. 6. c. 29), with parts of the law remaining on the books until 1967.

== History ==
=== Medieval Poor Laws ===
The Poor Laws in the aftermath of the Black Death (pictured), when labour was in short supply, were concerned with making the able-bodied work. (Also see: Sturdy beggar)

The earliest medieval Poor Law was the Ordinance of Labourers of King Edward III, issued in 1349 and revised in 1350. The ordinance was issued in response to the 1348–1350 outbreak of the Black Death in England, when an estimated 30–40% of the population died. The decline in population left surviving workers in great demand in the agricultural economy. Landowners had to face the choice of raising wages to compete for workers or letting their lands go unused. Wages for labourers rose, and this forced up prices across the economy as goods became more expensive to produce. An attempt to rein in prices, the ordinance (and subsequent acts, such the Statute of Labourers of 1351) required that everyone who could work did; that wages were kept at pre-plague levels; and that food was not overpriced. Workers saw these shortage conditions as an opportunity to flee employers and become freemen, so Edward III passed additional laws to provide for the punishment of the wave of escapee workers. In addition, the Statute of Cambridge, passed in 1388, placed restrictions on the movement of labourers and beggars.

=== Tudor Poor Law ===
The origins of the English Poor Law system can be traced back to late medieval statutes dealing with beggars and vagrancy, but it was only during the Tudor period that the Poor Law system was codified. Before the Dissolution of the Monasteries during the Tudor Reformation, monasteries had been the primary source of poor relief, but their dissolution resulted in poor relief moving from a largely voluntary basis to a compulsory tax that was collected at a parish level. Early legislation was concerned with vagrants and making the able-bodied work, especially while labour was in short supply following the Black Death.

Tudor attempts to tackle the problem originated during the reign of Henry VII. In 1495, Parliament passed the Vagabonds and Beggars Act, ordering that "vagabonds, idle and suspected persons shall be set in the stocks for three days and three nights and have none other sustenance but bread and water and then shall be put out of Town. Every beggar suitable to work shall resort to the Hundred where he last dwelled, is best known, or was born and there remain upon the pain aforesaid." Although this returned the burden of caring for the jobless to the communities producing more children than they could employ, it offered no immediate remedy to the problem of poverty; it was merely swept from sight, or moved from town to town. Moreover, no distinction was made between vagrants and the jobless; both were simply categorised as "sturdy beggars", to be punished and moved on.

In 1530, during the reign of Henry VIII, a proclamation was issued, describing idleness as the "mother and root of all vices" and ordering that whipping should replace the stocks as the punishment for vagabonds. This change was confirmed in the Vagabonds Act 1530 the following year, with one important change: it directed the justices of the peace to assign to the impotent poor an area within which they were to beg. Generally, the licences to beg for the impotent poor were limited to the disabled, sick, and elderly. An impotent person begging out of his area was to be imprisoned for two days and nights in the stocks, on bread and water, and then sworn to return to the place in which he was authorised to beg. An able-bodied beggar was to be whipped, and sworn to return to the place where he was born, or last dwelt for the space of three years, and there put himself to labour. Still no provision was made, though, for the healthy man simply unable to find work. All able-bodied unemployed were put into the same category. Those unable to find work had a stark choice: starve or break the law. In 1535, a bill was drawn up calling for the creation of a system of public works to deal with the problem of unemployment, to be funded by a tax on income and capital. A law passed a year later allowed vagabonds to be whipped.

In London, there was a great massing of the poor, and the Reformation threatened to eliminate some of the infrastructure used to provide for the poor. As a result, King Henry VIII consented to re-endow St. Bartholomew's Hospital in 1544 and St. Thomas' Hospital in 1552 on the condition that the citizens of London pay for their maintenance. However, the city was unable to raise enough revenue from voluntary contributions, so it instituted the first definite compulsory Poor Rate in 1547, which replaced Sunday collections in church with a mandatory collection for the poor. In 1555, London became increasingly concerned with the number of poor who could work, but yet could not find work, so it established the first House of Correction (predecessor to the workhouse) in the King's Palace at Bridewell where poor could receive shelter and work at cap-making, feather-bed making, and wire drawing.

For the able-bodied poor, life became even tougher during the reign of Edward VI. The Vagabonds Act 1547 was passed that subjected vagrants to some of the more extreme provisions of the criminal law, namely two years servitude and branding with a "V" as the penalty for the first offence, and death for the second. Justices of the Peace were reluctant to apply the full penalty. In 1552, Edward VI passed the Poor Act 1551 which designated a position of "Collector of Alms" in each parish and created a register of licensed poor. Under the assumption that parish collections would now relieve all poor, begging was completely prohibited.

The government of Elizabeth I, Edward VI's successor after Mary I, was also inclined to severity. The Vagabonds Act 1572 called for offenders to be burned through the ear for a first offence, and that persistent beggars should be hanged; however, the Act also made the first clear distinction between the "professional beggar" and those unemployed through no fault of their own. Early in her reign, Elizabeth I also passed laws directly aimed at providing relief for the poor. For example, in 1563, her Act for the Relief of the Poor required all parish residents with ability to contribute to poor collections. Those who "of his or their forward willful mind shall obstinately refuse to give weekly to the relief of the poor according to his or their abilities" could be bound over to justices of the peace and fined £10. Additionally, the 1572 Act further enabled Justices of the Peace to survey and register the impotent poor, determine how much money was required for their relief, and then assess parish residents weekly for the appropriate amount. The Poor Act 1575 required towns to create "a competent stock of wool, hemp, flax, iron and other stuff" for the poor to work on and houses of correction for those who refused to work where recalcitrant or careless workers could be forced to work and punished accordingly.

==== A new colonial solution ====
In the early 1580s, with the development of English colonisation schemes, initially in Ireland and later in North America, a new method to alleviate the condition of the poor would be suggested and utilised considerably over time. Merchant and colonisation proponent George Peckham noted the then-current domestic conditions; "there are at this day great numbers which live in such penurie & want, as they could be content to hazard their lives, and to ser[v]e one yeere for meat, drinke and apparell only, without wages, in hope thereby to amend their estates." With this, he may have been the first to suggest what became the institution of indentured service. At the same time Richard Hakluyt, in his preface to Divers Voyages, likens English planters to "Bees...led out by their Captaines to swarme abroad"; he recommends "deducting" the poor out of the realm. Hakluyt also broadens the scope and additionally recommends to empty the prisons and send them off to the New World.

By 1619 Virginia's system of indentured service would be fully developed, and subsequent colonies would adopt the method with modifications suitable to their different conditions and times. English penal transportation would be implemented soon afterwards, and evolve into a subsidized government endeavour with the Transportation Act 1717.

=== Old Poor Law ===
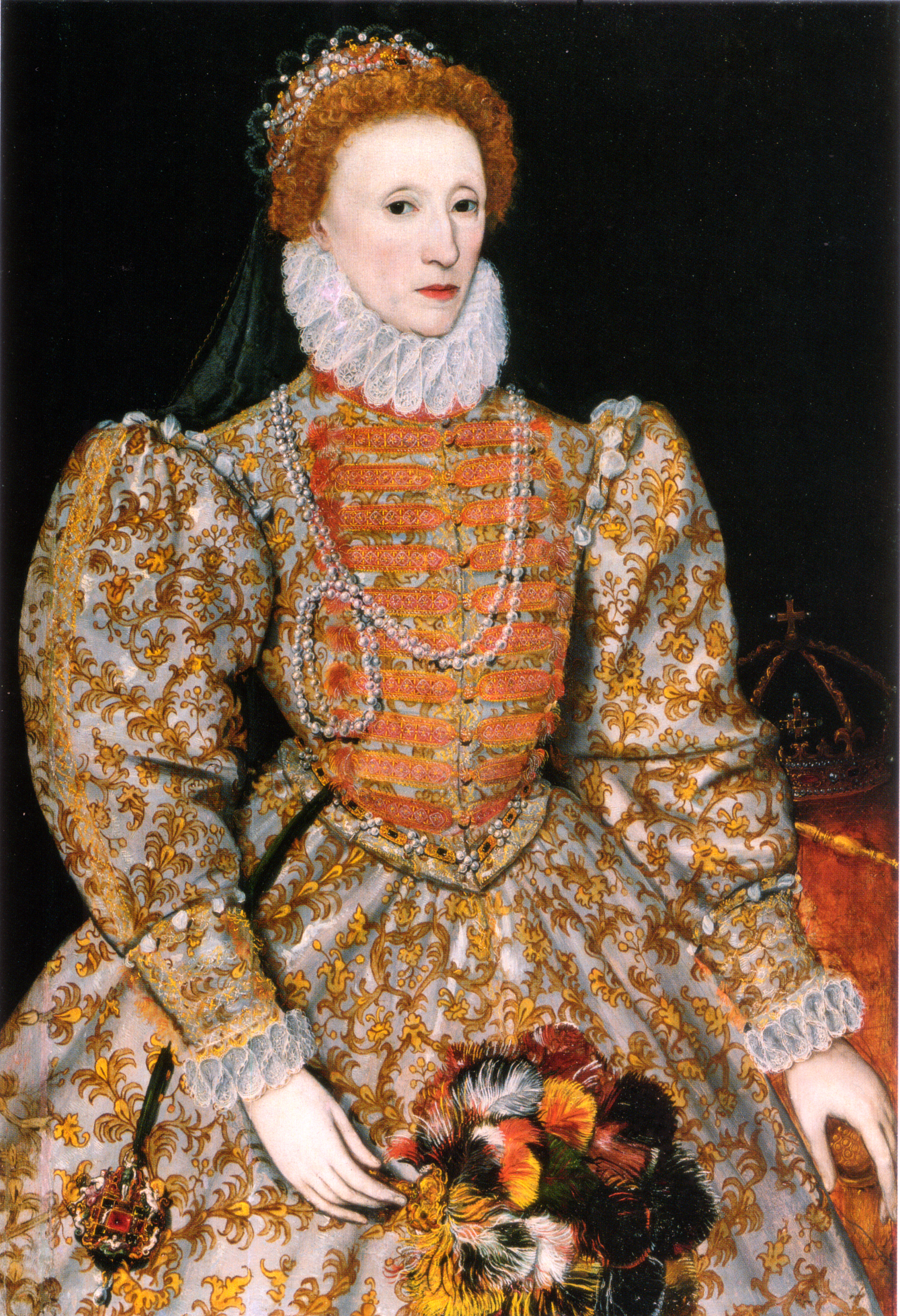
The Poor Relief Act 1601 is sometimes referred to as the "43rd Elizabeth" as it was passed in the 43rd year of the reign of Elizabeth I (pictured).

In 1597, a session of Parliament was called to deal with the issues of increased poverty and vagrancy, among other things. This session culminated in the passage of several Acts referred to as the "Poor Laws of 1598". Among them were the Poor Relief Act 1597 and the Vagabonds Act 1597. These laws were further refined and formalized by the next session of Parliament, primarily in the Poor Relief Act 1601. Together, these Acts of 1598 and 1601 came to be known as "The Elizabethan Poor Laws."

The more immediate origins of the Elizabethan Poor Law system were deteriorating economic circumstances in sixteenth-century England. Historian George Boyer has stated that England suffered rapid inflation at this time caused by population growth, the debasement of coinage and the inflow of American silver. Poor harvests in the period between 1595 and 1598 caused the numbers in poverty to increase, while charitable giving had decreased after the dissolution of the monasteries and religious guilds.

The Poor Relief Act 1601 created a system administered at parish level, paid for by levying local rates on rate payers. Relief for those too ill or old to work, the 'impotent poor', was in the form of a payment or items of food ('the parish loaf') or clothing also known as outdoor relief. Some aged people might be accommodated in parish alms houses, though these were usually private charitable institutions. Meanwhile, able-bodied beggars who had refused work were often placed in Houses of Correction or even subjected to beatings to mend their attitudes. Provision for the many able-bodied poor in the workhouse was relatively unusual, and most workhouses developed later. The 1601 Law made parents and children responsible for each other, so elderly parents would live with their children.

The Old Poor Law was a parish-based system; there were around 15,000 such parishes based upon the area around a parish church. The system allowed for despotic behaviour from the overseers of the poor, but as they would know their paupers, they were considered able to differentiate between the deserving and undeserving poor, making the system both more humane and initially more efficient. The population was then small enough for everyone to know everyone else's circumstances, so the idle poor would be unable to claim on the parishes' poor rate. The system provided social stability yet by 1750 needed to be adapted to cope with population increases, greater mobility and regional price variations.

The 1601 act sought to deal with 'settled' poor who had found themselves temporarily out of work—it was assumed they would accept indoor relief or outdoor relief. Neither method was then deemed harsh. The act was intended to deal with beggars who were considered a threat to civil order. The act was passed at a time when poverty was considered necessary as fear of poverty made people work. In 1607 a House of Correction was set up in each county. However, this system was separate from the 1601 system which distinguished between the settled poor and 'vagrants'. There was much variation in the application of the law and there was a tendency for the destitute to migrate towards the more generous parishes, usually situated in the towns. This led to the Settlement Act 1662 also known as the Poor Relief Act 1662, which allowed relief only to established residents of a parish; mainly through birth, marriage and apprenticeship. Unfortunately, the laws reduced the mobility of labour and discouraged the pauper from leaving his parish to find work. They also encouraged industry to create short contracts (e.g. 364 days) that did not make an employee eligible for poor relief.

A pauper applicant had to prove a settlement. If he could not, he was removed to the parish nearest to his birthplace, or where he prove some connection; some paupers were moved hundreds of miles. Although the parishes he passed through en route had no responsibility for him, they were supposed to supply food and drink and shelter for at least one night. An act of 1697 required beggars to wear a badge of red or blue cloth on the right shoulder with an embroidered letter "P" and the initial of their parish. However, this practice soon fell into disuse.

The workhouse movement began at the end of the 17th century with the establishment of the Bristol Corporation of the Poor, founded by the Bristol Poor Act in 1696. The corporation established a workhouse which combined housing and care of the poor with a house of correction for petty offenders. Following the example of Bristol, some twelve further towns and cities established similar corporations in the next two decades. As these corporations required private acts, they were unsuitable for smaller towns and individual parishes.

Starting with the parish of Olney, Buckinghamshire in 1714 several dozen small towns and individual parishes established their own institutions without any specific legal authorization. These were concentrated in the South Midlands and in the county of Essex. From the late 1710s the Society for the Promotion of Christian Knowledge began to promote the idea of parochial workhouses. The society published several pamphlets on the subject, and supported Sir Edward Knatchbull in his successful efforts to steer the Workhouse Test Act through Parliament in 1723. The act gave legislative authority for the establishment of parochial workhouses, by both single parishes and as joint ventures between two or more parishes. More importantly, the act helped to publicise the idea of establishing workhouses to a national audience. By 1776 some 1,912 parish and corporation workhouses had been established in England and Wales, housing almost 100,000 paupers. Perhaps one million people were receiving some kind of parish poor relief by the end of the century. Although many parishes and pamphlet writers expected to earn money from the labour of the poor in workhouses, the vast majority of people obliged to take up residence in workhouses were ill, elderly, or children whose labour proved largely unprofitable. The demands, needs and expectations of the poor also ensured that workhouses came to take on the character of general social policy institutions, combining the functions of creche, and night shelter, geriatric ward and orphanage. In 1782, Thomas Gilbert finally succeeded in passing the Relief of the Poor Act that established poor houses solely for the aged and infirm and introduced a system of outdoor relief for the able-bodied. This was the basis for the development of the Speenhamland system, which made financial provision for low-paid workers. Settlement Laws were altered by the Poor Removal Act 1795 which prevented non-settled persons from being moved on unless they had applied for relief. An investigation of the history and current state of the Poor Laws was made by Michael Nolan in his 1805 Treatise of the Laws for the Relief and Settlement of the Poor. The work would go on to three subsequent editions in Nolan's lifetime (Nolan was elected an MP for Barnstaple in 1820), and stoked the discussion both within and outside of Parliament.

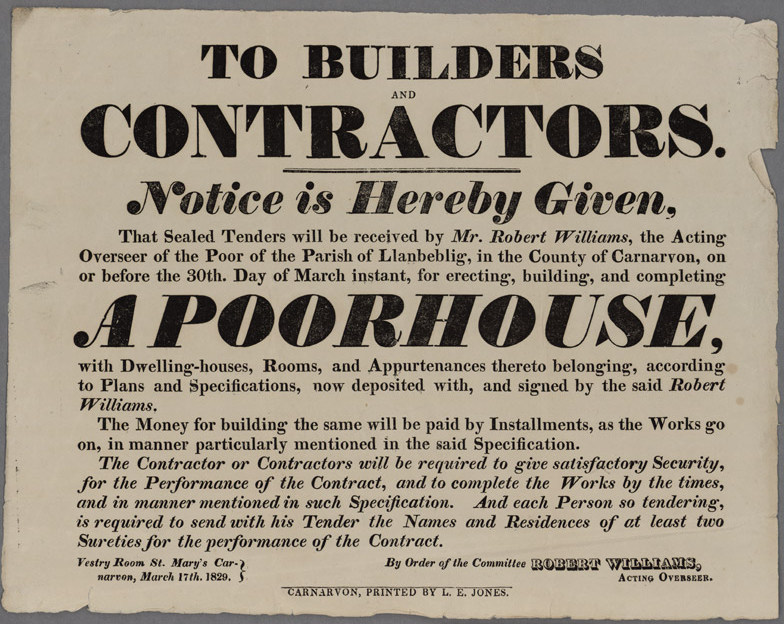
Advertisement for builders to build a new Workhouse in north Wales, 1829

During the Napoleonic Wars it became difficult to import cheap grain into Britain which resulted in the price of bread increasing. As wages did not also increase, many agricultural labourers were plunged into poverty. Following peace in 1814, the Tory government of Lord Liverpool passed the Corn Laws to keep the price of grain artificially high. 1815 saw great social unrest as the end of the French Wars saw industrial and agricultural depression and high unemployment. Social attitudes to poverty began to change after 1815 and overhauls of the system were considered. The Poor Law system was criticized as distorting the free market and in 1816 a parliamentary select committee looked into altering the system which resulted in the Sturges-Bourne's Act being passed. 1817 also saw the passing of the Public Works Loans Act 1817 (57 Geo. 3. c. 34), "to authorise the issue of Exchequer Bills and the Advance of Money out of the Consolidated Fund, to a limited Amount, for the carrying on of Public Works and Fisheries in the United Kingdom and Employment of the Poor in Great Britain". By 1820, before the passing of the Poor Law Amendment Act 1834 workhouses were already being built to reduce the spiralling cost of poor relief. Boyer suggests several possible reasons for the gradual increase in relief given to able-bodied males, including the enclosure movement and a decline in industries such as wool spinning and lace making. Boyer also contends that farmers were able to take advantage of the poor law system to shift some of their labour costs onto the tax payer.

=== The Royal Commission on the Poor Law ===
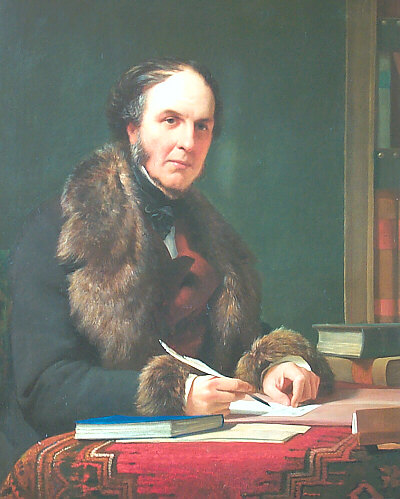
Nassau William Senior argued for greater centralization of the Poor Law system.

The 1832 Royal Commission into the Operation of the Poor Laws was set up following the widespread destruction and machine breaking of the Swing Riots. The report was prepared by a commission of nine, including Nassau William Senior, and served by Edwin Chadwick as Secretary. The royal commission's primary concerns were with illegitimacy (or "bastardy"), reflecting the influence of Malthusians, and the fear that the practices of the Old Poor Law were undermining the position of the independent labourer. Two practices were of particular concern: the "roundsman" system, where overseers hired out paupers as cheap labour, and the Speenhamland system, which subsidised low wages without relief. The report concluded that the existing Poor Laws undermined the prosperity of the country by interfering with the natural laws of supply and demand, that the existing means of poor relief allowed employers to force down wages, and, that poverty itself was inevitable.

The commission proposed the New Law be governed by two overarching principles:

- "less eligibility": that the pauper should have to enter a workhouse with conditions worse than that of the poorest free labourer outside of the workhouse.
- the "workhouse test", that relief should only be available in the workhouse. The reformed workhouses were to be uninviting, so that anyone capable of coping outside them would choose not to be in one.

When the act was introduced however it had been partly watered down. The workhouse test and the idea of "less eligibility" were never mentioned themselves and the recommendation of the royal commission that outdoor relief (relief given outside of a workhouse) should be abolished – was never implemented. The report recommended separate workhouses for the aged, infirm, children, able-bodied females and able-bodied males. The report also stated that parishes should be grouped into unions in order to spread the cost of workhouses and a central authority should be established in order to enforce these measures. The Poor Law Commission set up by Earl Grey took a year to write its report, the recommendations passed easily through Parliament support by both main parties the Whigs and the Tories. The bill gained royal assent in 1834. The few who opposed the bill were more concerned about the centralisation which it would bring rather than the underpinning philosophy of utilitarianism.

=== New Poor Law ===
The Poor Law Amendment Act 1834 was passed in 1834 by the government of Lord Melbourne and largely implemented the findings of the royal commission which had presented its findings two years earlier. The New Poor Law is considered to be one of the most "far-reaching pieces of legislation of the entire Nineteenth Century" and "classic example of the fundamental Whig–Benthamite reforming legislation of the period". The act aimed to reduce the burden on rate payers and can be seen as an attempt by the Whig government to win the votes of the classes enfranchised by the Great Reform Act. Despite being labelled an "amendment act" it completely overhauled the existing system and established a Poor Law Commission to oversee the national operation of the system. This included the forming together of small parishes into poor law unions and the building of workhouses in each union for the giving of poor relief. Although the legislation sought to reduce costs to rate payers, one area not reformed was the system's continued financing via "poor rates" on property owners.

Although the Poor Law Amendment Act 1834 did not ban all forms of outdoor relief, it stated that no able-bodied person was to receive money or other help from the Poor Law authorities except in a workhouse. Conditions in workhouses were to be made harsh to discourage people from claiming. Workhouses were to be built in every parish, or in poor law unions. The Poor Law Commissioners were to be responsible for overseeing the implementation of the act.

Various reasons prevented the application of some of the act's terms. Less eligibility was in some cases impossible without starving paupers, and the high cost of building workhouses incurred by rate payers meant that outdoor relief continued to be a popular alternative. Despite efforts to ban outdoor relief, parishes continued to offer it as a more cost-effective method of dealing with pauperism. The Outdoor Labour Test Order and Outdoor Relief Prohibitory Order were both issued to try to prevent people receiving relief outside of the workhouse.

When the new amendment was applied to the industrial North of England (an area the law had never considered during reviews), the system failed catastrophically as many found themselves temporarily unemployed, due to recessions or a fall in stock demands (so-called 'cyclical unemployment') and were reluctant to enter a workhouse, despite its being the only method of gaining aid. Nottingham also was allowed an exemption from the law and continued to provide outdoor relief.

The abuses and shortcomings of the system are documented in the novels of Charles Dickens and Frances Trollope and later in The People of the Abyss by Jack London. Despite the aspirations of the reformers, the New Poor Law was unable to make the Workhouse as bad as life outside. The primary problem was that in order to make the diet of the workhouse inmates "less eligible" than what they could expect outside, it would be necessary to starve the inmates beyond an acceptable level. It was for this reason that other ways were found to deter entrance to the workhouses. These measures ranged from the introduction of prison-style uniforms to the segregation of inmates into separate yards for men, women, boys, and girls.

In 1846, the Andover workhouse scandal, where conditions in the Andover Union workhouse were found to be inhumane and dangerous, prompted a government review and the replacement of the Poor Law Commission with a Poor Law Board. Now, a committee of Parliament was to administer the Poor Law, with a cabinet minister as head. Despite this another scandal occurred over inhumane treatment of paupers in the Huddersfield workhouse.

=== After the New Poor Law ===
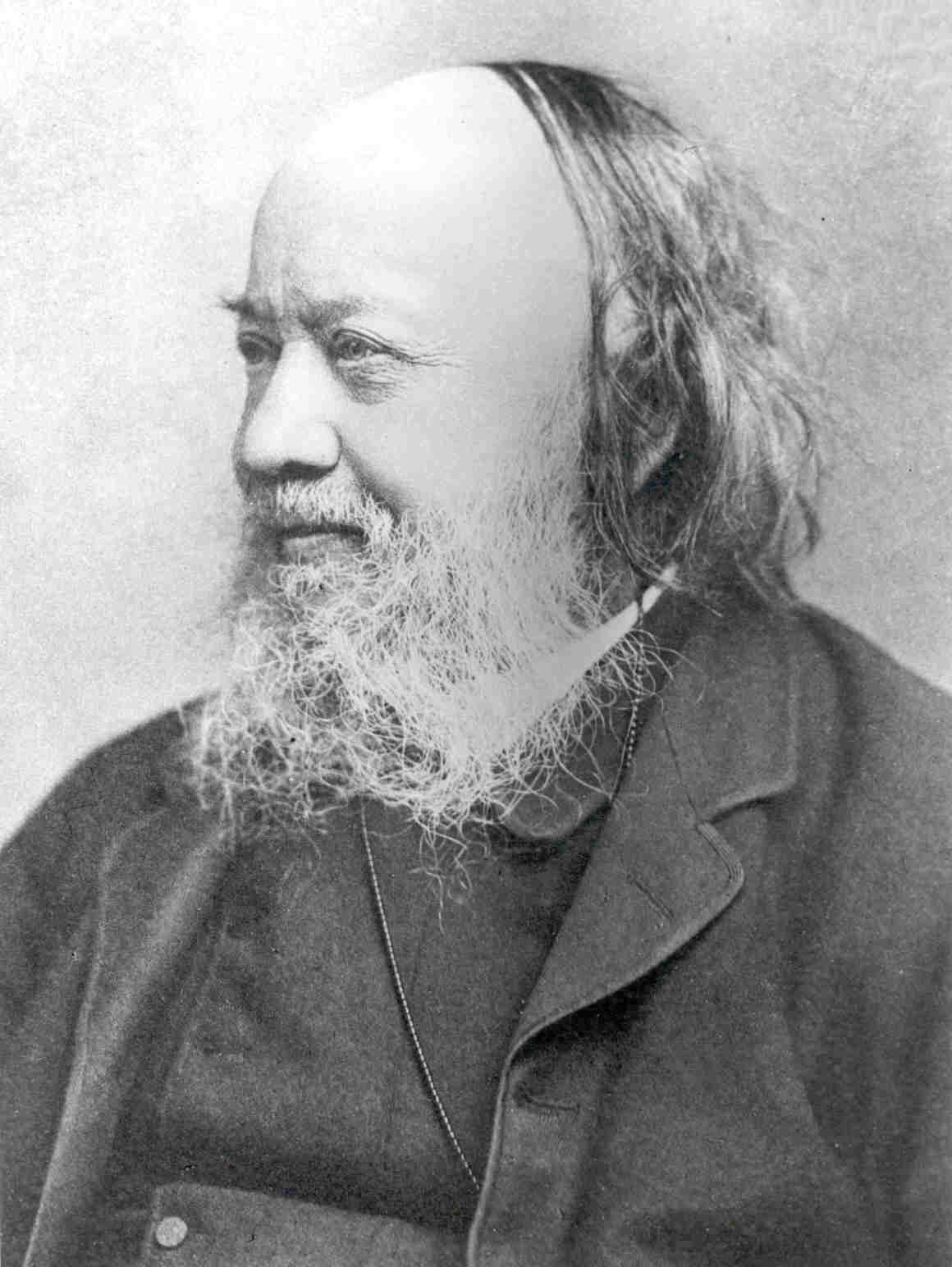
Infighting between Edwin Chadwick and other Poor Law Commissioners was one reason for an overhaul of Poor Law administration.

After 1847 the Poor Law Commission was replaced with a Poor Law Board. This was because of the Andover workhouse scandal and the criticism of Henry Parker who was responsible for the Andover union as well as the tensions in Somerset House caused by Chadwick's failure to become a Poor Law Commissioner. The Poor Law had been altered in 1834 because of increasing costs. The Workhouse Visiting Society which formed in 1858 highlighted conditions in workhouses and led to workhouses being inspected more often. The Union Chargeability Act 1865 was passed in order to make the financial burden of pauperism be placed upon the whole unions rather than individual parishes. Most boards of guardians were middle class and committed to keeping poor rates as low as possible. After the Reform Act 1867 there was increasing welfare legislation. As this legislation required local authorities' support the Poor Law Board was replaced with a Local Government Board in 1871. The Local Government Board led a crusade against outdoor relief supported by the Charity Organisation Society, an organization which viewed outdoor relief as destroying the self-reliance of the poor.

In 1864, the clergyman John Young Stratton published "The Life of a Farm Labourer" in The Cornhill Magazine, criticising the English Poor Law for what he regarded as its demoralising effect on rural labourers and arguing that institutional reform was necessary for their moral improvement.

The effect of this renewed effort to deter outdoor relief was to reduce claimants by a third and to increase numbers in the work house by 12–15%. County councils were formed in 1888, and district councils in 1894. This meant that public housing, unlike health and income maintenance, developed outside the scope of the Poor Law. Poor Law policy after the New Poor Law concerning the elderly, the sick and mentally ill and children became more humane. This was in part due to the expense of providing "mixed workhouses" as well as changing attitudes regarding the causes and nature of poverty.

=== Decline and abolition ===
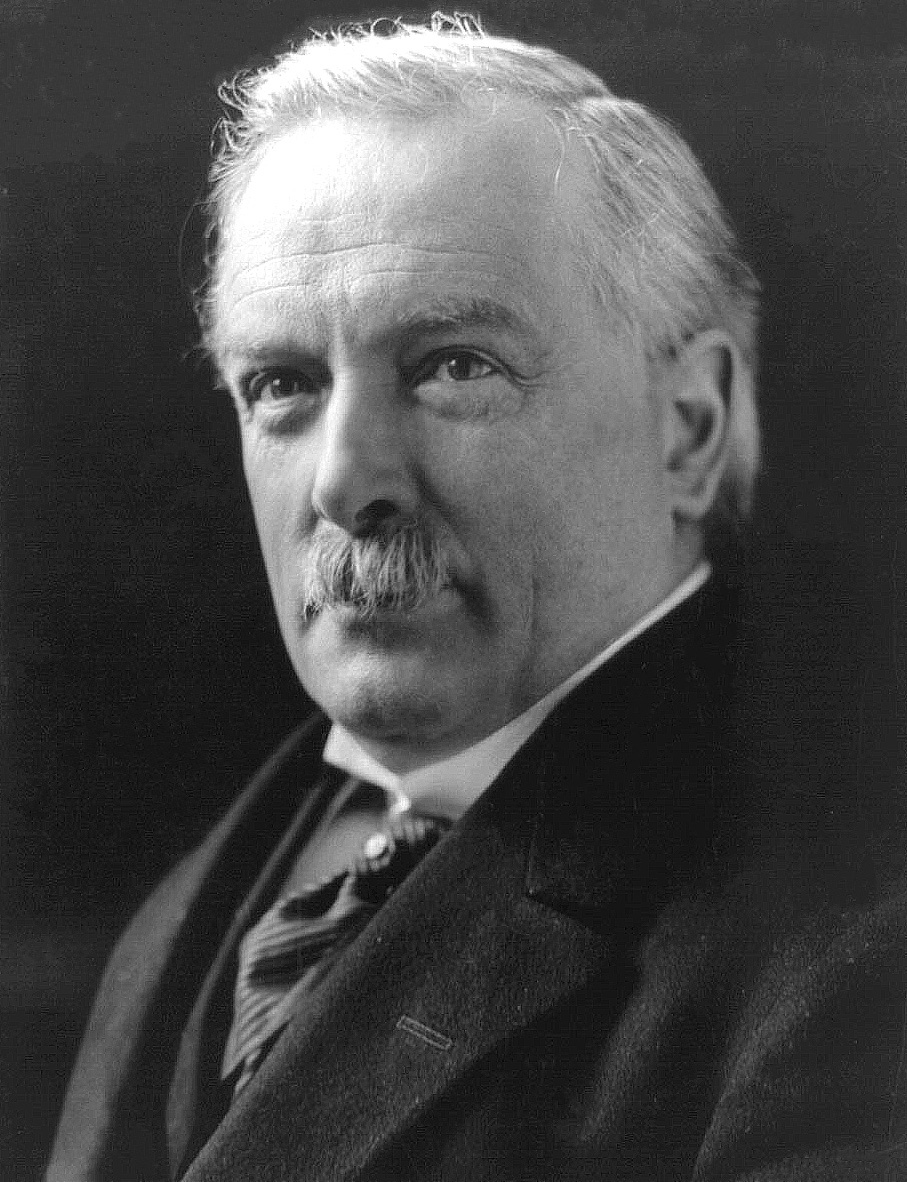
David Lloyd George, architect of the Liberal welfare reforms which were implemented outside of the Poor Law system and paved the way for the eventual abolition of the Poor Law

The Poor Law system began to decline with the availability of other forms of assistance. The growth of friendly societies provided help for its members without recourse to the Poor Law system. Some trade unions also provided help for their members. The Medical Relief Disqualification Removal Act 1885 meant that people who had accessed medical care funded by the poor rate were no longer disqualified from voting in elections. In 1886 the Chamberlain Circular encouraged the Local Government Board to set up work projects when unemployment rates were high rather than use workhouses. The Conservatives passed the Unemployed Workmen Act 1905 which provided for temporary employment for workers in times of unemployment.

In 1905 a royal commission was set up to investigate what changes could be made to the Poor Law. The commission produced two conflicting reports but both investigations were largely ignored by the Liberal government when implementing their own scheme of welfare legislation. The welfare reforms of the Liberal government made several provisions to provide social services without the stigma of the Poor Law, including old age pensions and National Insurance, and from that period fewer people were covered by the system. From 1911, the term "workhouse" was replaced by "Poor Law Institution". Means tests were developed during the inter-war period, not as part of the Poor Law, but as part of the attempt to offer relief that was not affected by the stigma of pauperism. According to Lees by slowly dismantling the system the Poor Law was "to die by attrition and surgical removals of essential organs".

During the First World War there is evidence that some workhouses were used as makeshift hospitals for wounded servicemen. Numbers using the Poor Law system increased during the interwar years and between 1921 and 1938 despite the extension of unemployment insurance to virtually all workers except the self-employed. Many of these workers were provided with outdoor relief. One aspect of the Poor Law that continued to cause resentment was that the burden of poor relief was not shared equally by rich and poor areas but, rather, fell most heavily on those areas in which poverty was at its worst. This was a central issue in the Poplar Rates Rebellion led by George Lansbury and others in 1921. Lansbury had in 1911 written a provocative attack on the workhouse system in a pamphlet entitled "Smash Up the Workhouse!".

Poverty in the interwar years (1918–1939) was responsible for several measures which largely killed off the Poor Law system. The Board of Guardians (Default) Act 1926 was passed in response to some Boards of Guardians supporting the miners during the General Strike. Workhouses were officially abolished by the Local Government Act 1929, and between 1929 and 1930 poor law guardians, the "workhouse test" and the term "pauper" disappeared. The Unemployment Assistance Board was set up in 1934 to deal with those not covered by the earlier National Insurance Act 1911 passed by the Liberals, and by 1937 the able-bodied poor had been absorbed into this scheme. By 1936 only 13% of people were still receiving poor relief in some form of institution.

In 1948 the Poor Law system was finally abolished with the introduction of the modern welfare state and the passing of the National Assistance Act. The National Health Service Act 1946 came into force in 1948 and created the modern day National Health Service.

== Opposition ==
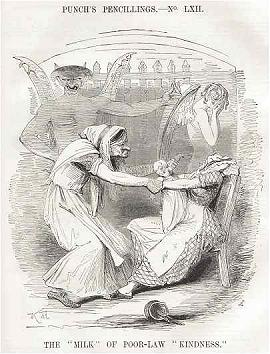
Punch criticized the New Poor Law's workhouses for splitting mothers and their infant children.

Opposition to the Poor Law grew at the beginning of the 19th century. The 1601 system was felt to be too costly and was considered in academic circles as encouraging the underlying problems. Jeremy Bentham argued for a disciplinary, punitive approach to social problems, whilst the writings of Thomas Malthus focused attention on overpopulation, and the growth of illegitimacy. David Ricardo argued that there was an "iron law of wages". The effect of poor relief, in the view of the reformers, was to undermine the position of the "independent labourer".

In the period following the Napoleonic Wars, several reformers altered the function of the "poorhouse" into the model for a deterrent workhouse. The first of the deterrent workhouses in this period was at Bingham, Nottinghamshire. The second was Becher's workhouse in Southwell, now maintained by the National Trust. George Nicholls, the overseer at Southwell, was to become a Poor Law Commissioner in the reformed system. The 1817 Report of the Select Committee on the Poor Laws condemned the Poor Law as causing poverty itself.

The introduction of the New Poor Law also resulted in opposition. Some who gave evidence to the Royal Commission into the Operation of the Poor Laws suggested that the existing system had proved adequate and was more adaptable to local needs. This argument was strongest in the industrial North of England and in the textile industries where outdoor relief was a more effective method of dealing with cyclical unemployment as well as being a more cost-effective method. Poor Law commissioners faced greatest opposition in Lancashire and the West Riding of Yorkshire where in 1837 there was high unemployment during an economic depression. The New Poor Law was seen as interference from Londoners with little understanding of local affairs. Opposition was unusually strong because committees had already been formed in opposition to the Ten Hours Movement, leaders of the Ten Hours campaign such as Richard Oastler, Joseph Rayner Stephens and John Fielden became the leaders of the Anti-Poor Law campaign. The Book of Murder was published and was aimed at creating opposition to the workhouse system. and pamphlets were published spreading rumour and propaganda about Poor Law Commissioners and alleged infanticide inside of workhouses. Opposition to the Poor Law yielded some successes in delaying the development of workhouses, and one workhouse in Stockport was attacked by a crowd of rioters. As many Boards of Guardians were determined to continue under the old system, the Poor Law Commission granted some boards the right to continue providing relief under the Old Poor Law. However, the movement against the New Poor Law was short-lived, leading many to instead turn towards Chartism.

== Scotland and Ireland ==
The Poor Law systems of Scotland and Ireland were distinct from the English Poor Law system covering England and Wales although Irish legislation was heavily influenced by the English Poor Law Amendment Act 1834. In Scotland the Poor Law system was reformed by the Poor Law (Scotland) Act 1845. In Ireland the Poor Relief (Ireland) Act 1838 was the first attempt to put control of the destitute and responsibility for their welfare on a statutory basis. Due to exceptional overcrowding, workhouses in Ireland stopped admissions during the Irish famine and increasingly resorted to outdoor relief. Emigration was sometimes used by landlords as a method of keeping the cost of poor relief down and removing surplus labour. Reforms after the Irish War of Independence resulted in the abolition of Boards of Guardians in the jurisdiction of the Irish Free State and their replacement by County Boards of Health.

== Historiography ==
The historiography of the Poor Laws has passed through several distinct phases. The "traditionalist" or "orthodox" account of the Poor Laws focuses upon the deficiencies of the Old Poor Law. This early historiography was influential in successfully overhauling the system. Mark Blaug presents the first revisionist analysis of the Poor Law in "The Myth of the Old Poor Law and the making of the New", commenting that the Old Poor Law did not reduce the efficiency of agricultural workers, lower wages, depress rents or compound the burden on rate payers. Blaug argues that Old Poor Law was a device "for dealing with the problems of structural unemployment and substandard wages in the lagging rural sector of a rapidly growing but still underdeveloped economy". Other areas of Poor Law which have concerned historians include the extent to which the Second Great Reform Act contributed to the Poor Law Amendment Act 1834 and the extent to which outdoor relief was abolished following the New Poor Law.

== See also ==
- Welfare, government programs that seek to provide a minimum level of income, service or other support for certain people
- Timeline of the English poor law system
- Social care in the United Kingdom
- History of the welfare state in the United Kingdom
