= Timeline of the English poor law system =

The following article presents a timeline of the poor law system in England from its origins in the Tudor and Elizabethan era to its abolition in 1948.

== 1300s ==
- 1344 - Royal Ordinance stated that lepers should leave London.
- 1388 - Statute of Cambridge passed.

== 1400s ==
- 1494 - Vagabonds and Beggars Act 1494 was passed.
- 1499 - Vagabonds and Beggars Act 1494 was disputed in parliament.

== 1500s ==
- 1597 - The Act for the Relief of the Poor 1597 provides the first complete code of Poor Relief

== 1600s ==
- 1601 - Old Poor Law passed. This would remain the basis of the Poor Law system until 1834
- 1662 - Poor Relief Act 1662 passed to deal with the problems of settlement
- 1697 - Poor Act 1697 passed

== 1700s ==
- 1723 - the workhouses decided to give jobs to the poor so there wouldn't been so much of them on the street
- 1782 - Relief of the Poor Act 1782 passed.

== 1800s ==
- 1815 - The French Wars come to an end.
- 1830 - The Swing Riots highlight the possibility of agricultural unrest.
- 1832 - The Royal Commission into the Operation of the Poor Laws begins its investigation into the Poor Law system
- 1834 - Poor Law Amendment Act 1834 passed
- 1842 - Outdoor Labour Test Order allows outdoor relief despite the Poor Law Amendment Act 1834's ban on it
- 1844 - Outdoor Relief Prohibitory Order issued to further discourage outdoor relief
- 1847 - The Poor Law Commission is abolished and replaced by the Poor Law Board
- 1848 - The Huddersfield workhouse scandal occurs.
- 1865 - The Union Chargeability Act 1865 is passed
- 1867 - The Second Reform Act
- 1871 - The Local Government Board takes the powers of the Poor Law Board

== 1900s ==
- 1905 - Royal Commission on the Poor Laws and Relief of Distress 1905-09 set up by the outgoing Conservative government.
- 1906 - The Liberal Government is elected and begins an ambitious programme of welfare reforms.
- 1909 - The Minority report
- 1929 - The workhouse system is abolished by the Local Government Act 1929.
- 1948 - The Poor Law system abolished by the National Assistance Act 1948 (11 & 12 Geo. 6. c. 29).
