= Poor Law policy after the New Poor Law =

Poor Law policy after the New Poor Law concerns the time period c. 1847–1900 after the implementation of the Poor Law Amendment Act 1834 until the beginnings of the decline of the Poor Law system at the start of the 20th century.

== Administration ==
The Poor Law Commission was abolished following the Andover workhouse scandal. Tensions among commissioners meant that the central administration of the system needed to change. The New Poor Law Board had a sitting President, usually a cabinet minister, so that the board could be both accountable to Parliament and more responsive to its wishes. The Local Government Board took over the role of the Poor Law Board after the passing of the Second Great Reform Act. The Reform Act enfranchised a greater number of people meaning that Parliament became more concerned with welfare.

== Cost ==
During this period the cost of the Poor Law system decreased. The Union Chargeability Act 1865 was passed in order to make each parish contribute to the union fund or poor relief. As most poor law guardians came from the middle classes there was an attempt to keep poor rates as low as possible which often meant offering outdoor relief rather than building costly workhouses.

== Outdoor relief ==
The numbers receiving outdoor relief actually rose during this period despite the attempts of the Poor Law Commission to limit outdoor relief. The Outdoor Relief Prohibitory Order was issued to reassert that the able-bodied should not receive outdoor relief and the Outdoor Labour Test Order meant that paupers in the North of England had to do hard monotonous work in order to receive outdoor relief. In 1863 when American crop failures led to an increase in pauperism the government passed short term measures which legitimized outdoor relief. The Local Government Board similarly encouraged those unions to limit outdoor relief.

== Improvement in conditions ==
During the period after the passing of the Poor Law Amendment Act 1834 to the start of the 20th century the treatment of paupers became more humane. From the 1870s it was considered preferable for the elderly to receive outdoor relief. In 1860 treatment of sick paupers also increased as hospitals were separated from workhouses. In 1834 pauper children received a workhouse education and eventually schools were built separate from workhouse buildings.
