= Andover workhouse scandal =

UK 1845 poor law scandal

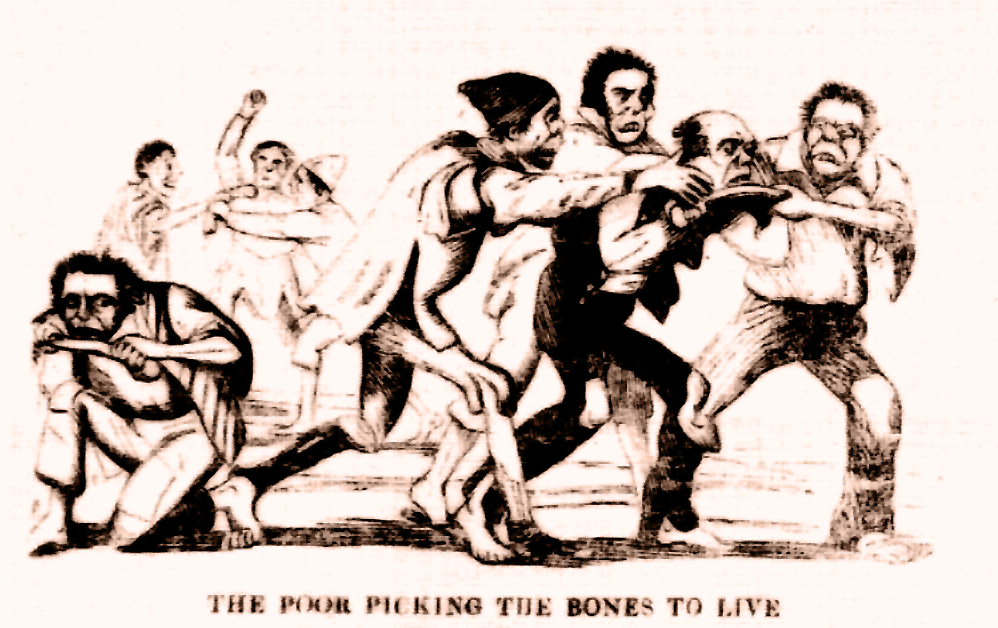
A newspaper illustration from The Penny Satirist (6 September 1845), depicting the inmates of Andover workhouse fighting over bones to eat.

The Andover workhouse scandal of the mid-1840s exposed serious defects in the administration of the English 'New Poor Law' (the Poor Law Amendment Act 1834). It led to significant changes in its central supervision and to increased parliamentary scrutiny. The scandal began with the revelation in August 1845 that inmates of the workhouse in Andover, Hampshire, England were driven by hunger to eat the marrow and gristle from (often putrid) bones which they were to crush to make fertilizer. The inmates' rations set by the local Poor Law guardians were less than the subsistence diet decreed by the central Poor Law Commission (PLC), and the master of the workhouse was diverting some of the funds, or the rations, for private gain. The guardians were loath to lose the services of the master, despite this and despite allegations of the master's drunkenness on duty and sexual abuse of female inmates. The commission eventually exercised its power to order dismissal of the master, after ordering two enquiries by an assistant-commissioner subject to a conflict of interest; the conduct of the second led to more public inquiry and drew criticism.

A replacement master was recommended by the assistant-commissioner as acceptable to the PLC, but newspapers pointed out that the new master had resigned as master of a workhouse elsewhere whilst under investigation by the PLC. The assistant commissioner was 'advised to resign' and did so but published a pamphlet giving details of his dealings with the PLC and with the Home Secretary (to whom, if anybody, the PLC were responsible).

The Home Secretary described the affair as merely 'a workhouse squabble' but the Commons set up a select committee in March 1846 to investigate both the Andover workhouse and the workings of the PLC more generally. The select committee found that there had been great mismanagement in the Andover board of guardians, and that their administration of the law had been marked by very unnecessary harshness. The committee found that the PLC—because of a power struggle between the commissioners and their secretary—had not conducted their business, as required by the act establishing them, by minuted meetings as a board; nor had adequate records been kept of their decisions and the reasons for them. The committee characterised the commissioners' conduct on matters within the committee's terms of reference as "irregular and arbitrary, not in accordance with the statute under which they exercise their functions, and such as to shake public confidence in their administration of the law", going on to note that the committee had in passing heard worrying evidence on matters outside its terms of reference on which it would be improper to base findings.

As a consequence of the committee's report (and hence of the Andover scandal), the Poor Law Administration Act 1847 replaced the Poor Law Commission with a Poor Law Board upon which a number of cabinet ministers sat ex officio.

== Background ==
=== The Swing Riots ===
Prior to 1834 the poor were provided for under the auspices of the "Old Poor Law," introduced in the Tudor period, which was funded by a parish rate levied on landowners and tenants. From this fund, each parish provided relief payments to residents who were ill or out of work. As the population grew – increasing by two thirds to almost 15 million between 1801 and 1830 – more and more people became dependent on parish relief, ratepayers began to complain about the costs, and increasingly lower levels of relief were provided. Three and a half "one gallon" bread loaves (each weighing 8 pounds and 11 ounces) per week were considered necessary for a man in 1795. By November 1830, the ration in the Andover area had been reduced to one quarter of a loaf per day (i.e., reduced by half). There was also a feeling amongst the middle and upper classes that they were paying the poor to be idle and avoid work. The way in which poor law funds were disbursed led to a further reduction in agricultural wages, since farmers would pay their workers as little as possible, knowing that the parish fund would top up wages to a basic subsistence level (see Speenhamland system).

The introduction of mechanical threshing machines, which could do the work of many men, further threatened the livelihoods of hundreds of thousands of farmworkers. Following poor harvests in 1828 and 1829, farm labourers faced the approaching winter of 1830 with dread. The Swing Riots – which had begun in Kent in June 1830 – finally broke out in Andover and the surrounding parishes on 19 November 1830, coinciding with the Annual Fair when the town was full with labourers. Over the next two days gangs of labourers set fire to haystacks and destroyed threshing machines while demanding an increase in wages and a reduction in rents. On the afternoon of 20 November a mob of 300 labourers set off from the Angel Inn public house and attacked the Waterloo Ironworks in Anna Valley on the outskirts of the town, pulling down walls and part of the roof, smashing some half-made ploughs and damaging the foundry's crane and waterwheel. The town's magistrates wrote to the Home Secretary, Lord Melbourne on 20 and 21 November requesting military support to restore order. By 15:00 on 21 November, The Times reported, "an immense multitude" had assembled in the town centre and, "flushed with liquor" proceeded to break down the gates of the jail and release one of their leaders who had earlier been arrested. Armed with clubs, staves and flails they threatened to burn down the properties of anybody who refused to give them money, saying that they had been "starving with their wives and families on potatoes and bread long enough." On 22 November the 9th Lancers were deployed to Andover and the riots were quelled by 23 November. By 29 November, Winchester jail was full to capacity with arrested labourers, and more prisoners were being held under guard by the Lancers in their barracks.

In the trials that followed, held before Mr. Baron Vaughan, Mr. Justice James Parke and Mr. Justice Alderson at a Special Commission of Assize at Winchester in December 1830, the accused were not allowed counsel to represent them, and the jury consisted entirely of magistrates, three of whom had been directly affected by property damage during the riots. The charge laid against the majority was one of "riotous assembly." Ten Andover labourers received the death sentence, subsequently commuted to transportation to Australia. Two Hampshire labourers were hanged and the other convicted men were made to watch the executions.

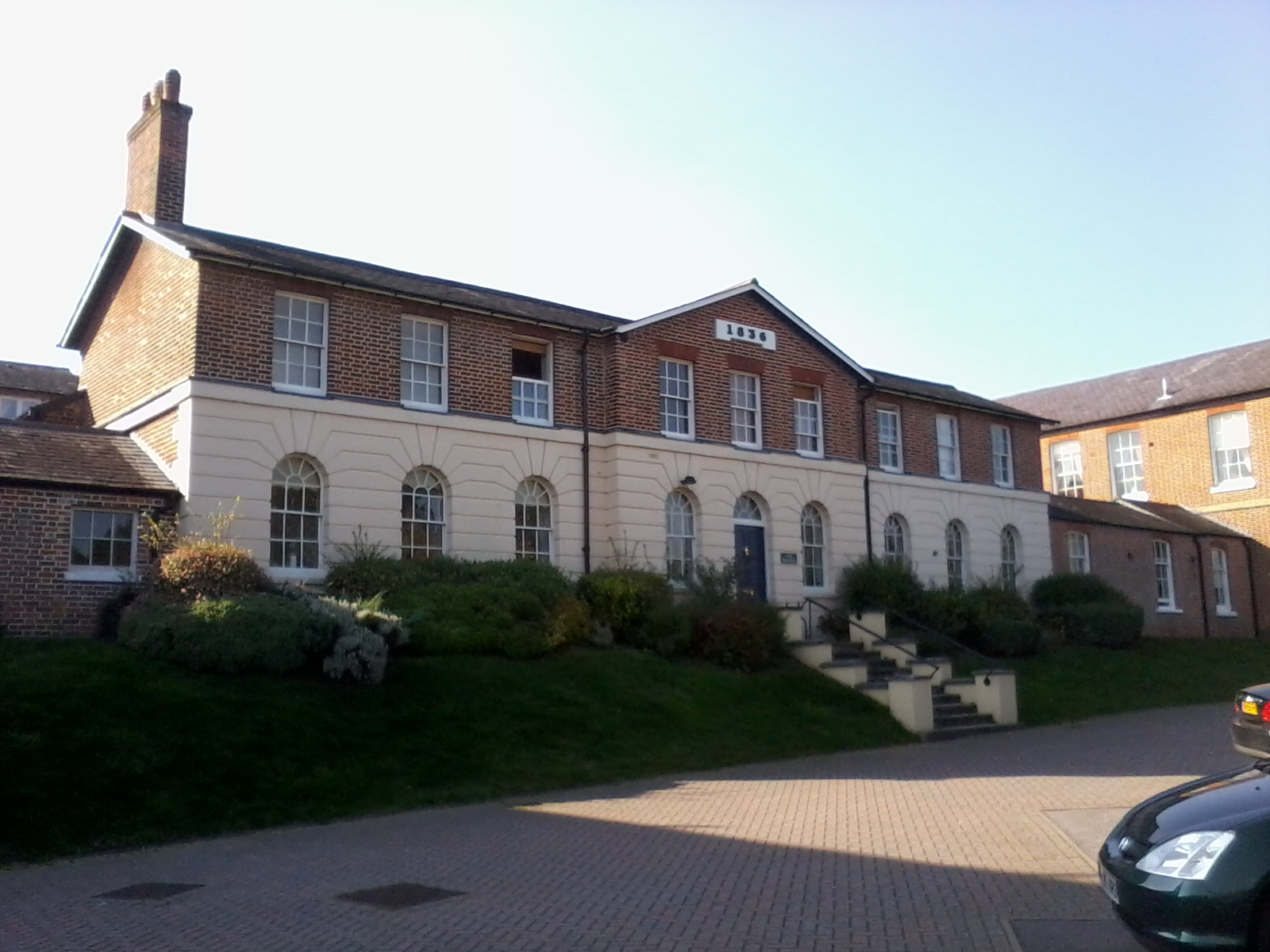
The former Andover workhouse is now a Grade II listed building and has been converted into luxury residential properties renamed "The Cloisters."

=== Poor Law Amendment Act 1834 ===
In the wake of the Swing Riots which had swept the South of England between June and November 1830, the Prime Minister, Earl Grey, established the Royal Commission into the Operation of the Poor Laws 1832 to decide how to change the Poor Law systems in England and Wales. The Commission took a year to write its report, which proposed a "New Poor Law" governed by two overarching principles:

- the "workhouse test" – that relief for the able-bodied should only be available in the workhouse.
- "less eligibility" – that the pauper should have to enter a workhouse with conditions worse than those of the poorest 'free' labourer outside of the workhouse.

The report also recommended that parishes should be grouped into "unions" in order to spread the cost of workhouses and a central authority should be established in order to enforce these measures. The subsequent legislation, the Poor Law Amendment Act 1834 passed easily through Parliament supported by the leadership of both main parties, the Whigs and the Tories. It did not directly impose the recommended new regime, but set up the Poor Law Commission (PLC) as a central authority (with wide-ranging powers and minimal oversight by Parliament) to bring about the desired changes. There were three Poor Law Commissioners; under them were a number of Assistant Commissioners, each responsible for a designated area of the country, within which they inspected and advised the poor law authorities.

The Poor Law Commission required that the diet of able-bodied workhouse inmates be worse than that of the working poor locally; since the latter varied across the country, the PLC had a number of standard 'dietaries' and specified for each workhouse the appropriate dietary: the specified dietary was the most generous the PLC would permit, but local guardians were free to feed their paupers less. Able-bodied inmates had to perform work to earn their rations; the work should not compete with that which could be done commercially, nor should it be degrading or essentially penal (this excluded activities with no usable product − such as the treadmill − but not such activities as picking oakum or stone-breaking). Even so, the centrally-sanctioned rations were strictly observed: "The Guardians under this Act dare not give one spoonful of porridge more to the inmates of a workhouse then their great three masters chose to order" was how the Revd G.S. Bull, a critic of the PLC and 1834 Act, chose to highlight this.

Following the introduction of the new poor law regime in the South of England, the poor-rate fell by twenty per cent and the system was credited with having achieved this (and having made agricultural labourers less surly to their employers). However, the introduction of the new regime had coincided with a "surge of prosperity" nationally; this ended about 1837 and a series of poor harvests together with the European Potato Failure due to potato blight that struck Northern Europe in the mid-1840s led to "the Hungry Forties", a period much more testing of the provisions for poor relief.

== Andover Poor Law Union and its workhouse ==
The new poor law encouraged the formation of Poor Law Unions, combining individual parishes to give an administrative unit large enough to support the provision of segregated accommodation to house the various categories of paupers. On 11 July 1835, at the first meeting of the Board of Guardians of the newly formed Andover Union, it was decided to commission the construction of a new workhouse "calculated to contain 400 persons." on the outskirts of Andover. Although the parliamentary borough constituency of Andover returned two Members of Parliament, one (Ralph Etwall) an 'independent Reformer' opposed to the new Poor Law as too harsh, only five of the guardians were from Andover itself; thirty two surrounding parishes were each entitled to elect one guardian (Note: County magistrates, such as Etwall and Dodson, were Poor Law guardians without election, simply by virtue of their office) (although it was noted in 1841 that only nineteen had done so) and their views prevailed. The cost of burying paupers dying in the workhouse (and of prosecuting any paupers committing offences in the workhouse) was charged to the ratepayers of Andover, not to the parish from which the pauper had come. Repeated attempts by the Andover guardians and other prominent citizens to have a relieving officer resident in the town (rather than four miles out of town) were rejected. Attendance at board meetings was low, especially when difficult decisions were to be taken; much was left to the chairman (Christopher Dodson, rector of Penton Mewsey) and his deputy.

The official 'clerk to the board' was Thomas Lamb, an Andover solicitor, but the actual duties were carried out by one of his clerks, in whom both Lamb and the board had the utmost confidence. In 1842, suspicions having been voiced by the overseer of the poor for Andover, where the clerk had been appointed collector of the poor rates, the clerk fled, subsequent investigation showing a deficiency of some £1,380 in the union's accounts. A public meeting in Andover then petitioned Parliament to be allowed to secede from the Andover Union, which would allow poor relief in Andover to be administered more cheaply, more efficiently, and more humanely: (Note: As Etwall had pointed out at the meeting, Andover fell well below the minimum population to form a separate poor law authority) Etwall wrote to the Poor Law Commission (twice) asking for an investigation of the affairs of the Andover union. The sureties for the clerk were not called in, Lamb making up the shortfall from his own pocket: (Note: A bond for £500 in the Union's possession had not been properly witnessed: it was thought the clerk had substituted it for a valid bond for £1000 Lamb did not similarly replace a further £200 lost by Andover parish from the clerk's activities as collector of rates for the parish) the Poor Law Commission ordered that the Union's auditor be replaced. When the clerk was caught (some fifteen months later) and charged, his defence counsel spoke of a young man led astray by a general laxity and lack of supervision of the Union's money: he did not have to develop this theme because the charges against his client (as drafted) required proof that when he had been given money as an agent of the Union he had already formed the intent to embezzle it, and the prosecution had failed to produce evidence on that point. (Note: This may not have been casual incompetence: the clerk had a job and a fiancee in London – the job was held open for him during the trial and the clerk seems to have married in the same quarter as his acquittal)

Andover's new workhouse was designed by architect Sampson Kempthorne, using his standard "cruciform" plan which provided an entrance and administrative block at the east "containing the board-room, porter's quarters, a nursery and stores. To the rear, four wings radiated from a central supervisory hub which contained the kitchens, with the master's quarters above. Females were accommodated at the north side and males at the south. The west of these wings contained the dining-hall which was also used as a chapel. Girls and boys school-rooms and dormitories lay down the west side with exercise yards beyond. Along the north side of the workhouse were casual wards and female sick wards. Male sick wards were at the south." At the 1841 census, the workhouse held twelve men, nineteen women, thirty-two boys, and thirty-four girls, in addition to nine resident staff. The master of the workhouse, Colin McDougal, was a Chelsea Pensioner and veteran of Waterloo with nearly thirty years service in the Royal Horse Artillery, ending as a staff sergeant: his wife was matron.

One of the standard workhouse tasks was the reduction of animal bones to bone meal; at Andover this was done not by milling or grinding, but by crushing: a heavy rammer was lifted and dropped in order to pound the pieces of bone in an open trough. Bone-crushing had been recommended by an assistant commissioner overseeing the Andover Union, and the Andover workhouse medical officer had endorsed the practice as carried out there. Although the Home Secretary Sir James Graham had repeatedly expressed his 'dislike' of the practice 'which he did not think was suitable to a workhouse', the PLC had not considered they had the power to forbid it.

== The scandal ==
=== Bone-gnawing ===
In February 1845, Hugh Munday, one of the Poor Law Guardians elected by Andover (a cornfactor, magistrate for the borough, and formerly involved with administration of the old poor law) raised at the weekly meeting of the board of guardians rumours that paupers set to work to crush animal bones (to produce bone meal fertiliser) were in the habit of eating marrow and gristle still adhering to the bones. The board discounted the rumours, but Munday persuaded a few of the doubters to accompany him when he interviewed some of the paupers. The workhouse master produced ten or twelve paupers, who confirmed the tale; they said that they fought each other for the bones if they were fresh, but they were so hungry that they ate the marrow even when the bones were putrid. (Note: Most, however, said they did not eat marrow from bones known to be horse bones.) Munday had urged a subsequent board meeting to report the bone gnawing to the Poor Law Commission and ask for an inquiry, but this was rejected without a motion being formally put. Munday had therefore written to Etwall, and to two other MPs (both vehement opponents of the New Poor Law). Etwall did not immediately raise the issue, but in August 1845, nearly at end of the parliamentary session, Thomas Wakley MP for Finsbury asked the Home Secretary Sir James Graham what the Poor Law Commission had told Graham of the practice. Graham had had no information, doubted that the report was true, but promised an immediate investigation. The next working day Mr Parker, the assistant-commissioner whose area included the Andover Union, was sent to Andover to investigate; he took a sworn statement from Munday and then – as he had told Munday he would – returned to London. The next two days, however, he held an inquiry on the workhouse premises; the inquiry (which, formally, was not to allow the assistant commissioner to reach a judgement, but to allow him to ascertain facts and report them for the consideration of the commission) was not held behind closed doors, but it was not publicised; the following week's Hampshire Advertiser reported (briefly) that the enquiry had taken place, but its result was not yet made known.

=== Charges against the master ===
Further accusations followed rapidly; the Times and the Evening Mail. (Note: The Mail's reports replicate those in the Times and although the Mail credited its coverage of the story to "Our Own Correspondent", he later reported his unsuccessful attempt to attend a meeting of the board of guardians as the reporter of the Times.) reporting that the 9 August meeting of the Andover Union guardians had heard allegations that the workhouse master had failed to supply sick paupers with the dietary extras ordered by the medical officer, and had been diverting workhouse provisions for his own profit. Mr Parker returned to Andover to hold hearings on these further charges; after agreeing that the inquiry would be held in public, he adjourned proceedings for a week to give the master (who remained in post) time to prepare his defence. Thomas Westlake, the medical officer, who had made these allegations then wrote to the Poor Law Commission making yet further allegations: that there had been persistent peculation to support the household of a married daughter of the master, and that McDougal had 'frequently taken liberties with the younger women and girls in this house, and attempted at various times to prevail upon them, by force or otherwise, to consent to gratify his wishes; that he has actually had criminal intercourse with some of the female inmates, and for a length of time has been guilty of drunkenness and other immoralities' When the inquiry resumed, Parker refused to take any evidence on the additional charges until he had further instructions from the commission. Furthermore, he would only hear evidence of paupers not getting what they should; evidence of pigs being fed potatoes billed as paupers' rations was irrelevant. Parker repeatedly criticised Westlake for not recording his extras in the form (and on the forms) prescribed by the commission; he also put the responsibility for formulation and prosecution of charges entirely on Westlake; Westlake's supporters therefore engaged a barrister (Note: Michael Prendergast; a barrister of Liberal and anti-Poor Law sympathies who eventually became Recorder of Norwich and Judge to the Sheriffs' Court of the City of London -"In the discharge of his duties in that Court, he frequently manifested eccentricities that brought him into disfavour, and made himself notable by his strange lack of dignity and extra-judicial method of examining and arguing with witnesses. Nevertheless his judgements were marked by a righteous integrity, and it was rarely that either plaintiff or defendant suffered through his strange laxity of manner, which frequently brought upon him the strictures of the press and the censures of private observers") The barrister had been senior to (and more successful than) Parker at the Bar and relations between the two became progressively more strained. After yet another criticism of Westlake's laxity in record-keeping, his barrister retorted that if Westlake had been at fault, then there were others whose duty it was to see that the books of the union were in order; the union's auditors, its guardians, and its supervising assistant commissioner, and it might be that in due course that charges would be brought against them. (Note: Parker responded (correctly) that he had oversight of many unions (eighty-six was the number generally quoted by witnesses at the select committee), and it was simply not possible for him to check that their books were kept correctly; he was however wrong to deny that the PLC's instructions to assistant-commissioners made this one of their duties.) The prosecution alleged that MacDougal was intimidating witnesses under the nose of Parker; Parker denied this, but it was acknowledged on all sides that workhouse inmates who had testified that MacDougal had 'taken liberties' with them had subsequently been verbally abused and physically assaulted by Mrs MacDougal. After eleven days of hearing prosecution witnesses, Parker announced that he would hear no new cases or witnesses; the prosecution had listed over a hundred witnesses, and it would take three months to hear them all. It took another two days to complete the prosecution case: Parker announced that he would hear the defence against the charges relating to diversion of goods to the married daughter in two days time, then adjourn proceedings to allow the defence against the other charges to be prepared. However, the following day Westlake received a letter from the Poor Law Commission suspending the inquiry.

== See also ==
- Huddersfield workhouse scandal
