= Oriel Noetics =

The Oriel Noetics is a term now applied to a group of early 19th-century dons of the University of Oxford closely associated with Oriel College. John Tulloch in 1885 wrote about them as the "early Oriel school" of theologians, the contrast being with the Tractarians, also strongly based in Oriel.

The Noetics were moderate freethinkers and reformers within the Church of England. In terms of Anglican religious parties, the Noetics were High Church opponents of evangelicalism, but adhered also to a rationalism from the previous century. They advocated for a "national religion" or national church, and in their own view stood for orthodoxy rather than liberalism. In politics, they were associated with the Whigs, and influenced prominent statesmen such as Lord John Russell, Viscount Morpeth, and Thomas Spring Rice.

Distinctively, the Noetics combined natural theology with political economy. Their approach had something in common with that of Thomas Chalmers, and had much support at the time outside the college in Oxford, and more widely.

== The Noetics at Oriel ==
Oriel College at the beginning of the 19th century had a policy of recruitment of Fellows on merit, disregarding both patronage and examination classes in search of intellectual calibre. The college was also abstemious, compared with the others, and the "Oriel teapot" became proverbial.

Prominent Noetics who were directly associated with Oriel included the successive Provosts John Eveleigh and Edward Copleston. Others who were Fellows of the College for some period were Thomas Arnold, Joseph Blanco White, Renn Dickson Hampden, Edward Hawkins, and Richard Whately. Baden Powell was an undergraduate at Oriel. John Davison was excluded from the group of Noetics when William Tuckwell wrote about them in the early 20th century, but is counted by Richard Brent in the Oxford Dictionary of National Biography.

== Relationship with the High Church men ==
The Edinburgh Review called Oriel under Copleston "the school of speculative philosophy in England". Copleston was seen by Edward William Grinfield in 1821 as undermining the orthodox Anglicanism of Joseph Butler's natural theology. He took care to rebut this charge; and Grinfield in the British Critic was represented as over-impressed by Oriel's reputation. Baden Powell remained close to his High Church roots, an ally of the Hackney Phalanx.

John Henry Overton argued that Copleston was his own man, not attached to a church party; and that his leaving Oxford in 1827 as a bishop removed his influence. A split in views developed in the run-up to the Roman Catholic Relief Act 1829, which left the Oriel group and the diehard Hackney Phalanx on opposite sides of the question, Baden Powell siding with the reforming views of others in the college.

== Relationship with the Tractarians ==
The rise of the "Oxford Movement" proved very divisive within Oriel College, where John Keble, John Henry Newman and Hurrell Froude held positions. The successor to Copleston as Provost was Hawkins. By 1833 the fellowship split with four fellows opposed to the incipient Tractarian moves, while more were broadly supportive. Hawkins was an early influence on Newman, but his election (defeating Keble) blocked internal changes to college teaching in 1831, which Newman, Froude and Robert Wilberforce wished to have more of a pastoral content; the other tutor of the time, Joseph Dornford, supported Hawkins.

== Political economy ==
The Noetics stood for a degree of curriculum reform in the university, in the form of optional courses. As part of this drive, Copleston and Whately in 1831 introduced a course on political economy, treated in the context of natural theology. It drew on Whately's Elements of Logic, which had an appendix on political economy by Nassau Senior. Whately was Drummond Professor of Political Economy for a year after Senior, but left Oxford in 1831.

== Social policy ==
It has been claimed that the composition of the Royal Commission into the Operation of the Poor Laws 1832 was heavily slanted towards followers of the Noetics. Among reformers involved named as aligned with the Noetics and their views are William Sturges Bourne, Walter Coulson, and Henry Gawler. Edwin Chadwick, an assistant commissioner, had contributed to the London Review founded as an organ for the Noetics.
