= 1832 Royal Commission into the Operation of the Poor Laws =

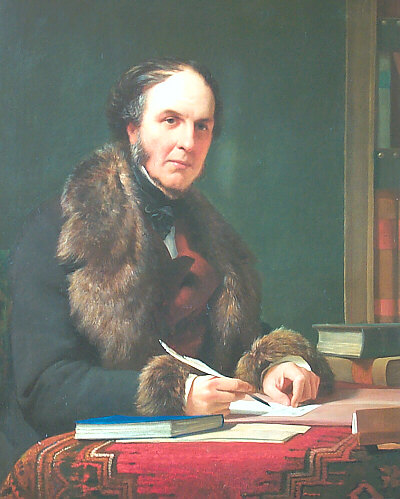
Nassau William Senior was an advocate of the centralization of the Poor Law system.

The 1832 Royal Commission into the Operation of the Poor Laws was a group set up to decide how to change the Poor Law systems in England and Wales. The group included Nassau Senior, a professor from Oxford University who was against the allowance system, and Edwin Chadwick, who was a follower of Jeremy Bentham, the English philosopher. The recommendations of the Royal Commission's report were implemented in the Poor Law Amendment Act 1834.

== Formation ==
On 1 February 1832, the formation of the royal commission was announced by Viscount Althorp in the House of Commons. The royal commission consisted initially of seven commissioners and sixteen assistant commissioners. The central board was expanded to nine commissioners in 1833. The assistant commissioners were to be sent out into England and Wales to collect data on poverty by visiting parishes and by having persons respond to questionnaires, and the central board would digest the information into a report.

The findings of the commissioners, published in thirteen volumes, began appearing in February 1833. They were used to argue that the existing system of poor relief needed a radical overhaul.

== Members ==
The nine members of the Central Board of the Commission were:

- Charles James Blomfield (Bishop of London) - Chairman
- William Sturges Bourne (chairman of the 1817 parliamentary commission)
- John Bird Sumner (Bishop of Chester)
- Nassau Senior
- Walter Coulson
- Rev. Henry Bishop, a fellow of Oriel College, University of Oxford
- Henry Gawler
- James Trail
- Edwin Chadwick (secretary)

The first seven members of the Central Board were appointed in 1832. The last two members were appointed in 1833. However, ultimately Trail was too ill to serve.

== The report of the Commission ==
The Commission recommended four radical changes to the existing English Poor Laws:

- separate workhouses for different types of paupers including aged, children, able-bodied males and able-bodied females.
- the grouping of parishes into unions to provide workhouses.
- a ban on outdoor relief so that people had to enter workhouses to claim relief
- a central authority to implement the policies and to prevent the variation that in practice occurred under the Old Poor Law.

== The response to the report from Parliament ==
There was strong support for the report from all sides of Parliament, and the ideas were quickly passed into law. The Whigs controlled the House of Commons and supported the utilitarian arguments of thinkers such as Jeremy Bentham. Those who did not support the bill were more concerned with the levels of centralisation the act would bring than the report's recommendations, such as the building of workhouses. However, the commission's influence on the Whigs' immediate passage of legislation is questionable since in letters to Sir Robert Peel on 26 December 1841 and 17 Sept 1842, Sir James Graham said that the Whigs had already decided what they would do before the report came out. That would mean that the objective of the Royal Commission's investigation was to supply the evidence to support the idea of a deterrent workhouse, which would be a self-acting test of poverty and/or destitution. The report lowered the cost of poor relief, which concerned MPs.

== Criticism ==
There is evidence that Nassau Senior had written the report before the data was collected and that evidence was used selectively to meet the prewritten report. Of the questionnaires sent out, only 10% replied, and some of the questions directed a certain response. However, the inquiry was not supposed to be impartial since the commission wanted to change the existing system, and keeping the current system was not considered an option. The questionnaires used asked leading questions, which were poorly framed and led to responses that were ambiguous or irrelevant.

From a modern standpoint, it can be argued that despite the long term effects of the ensuing Poor Law Amendment, the report itself was wildly inaccurate. Most of the relief was received by the undeserving poor (those who were considered not "able-bodied" and therefore undeserving of poverty), which contrasted with the reports findings. Only 20% of the total population of 12 million were claiming poor relief, of which only 20% were "able-bodied", 50% were children under 15 and 9% to 20% were sick, aged or infirm. Many of the moral judgements that supported Benthamite ideas were thus unfounded. Bloy (2002) observed:

"They fell into the trap of assuming that employers and workers could bargain on equal terms, which they could not and did not. The Commissioners argued that the existing means of poor relief allowed unscrupulous employers and farmers to force down wages and deliberately to keep a pool of surplus labour because they knew the workers could 'fall on the rates' if it suited business. It was accepted that poverty was inevitable ("the poor are always with you') so nothing was done to tackle that problem. It was thought that a deterrent workhouse would cause a moral reformation among the poor: that they would go out and find work rather than submit to 'the House'. Unfortunately, there was little work to be found in the rural south so the whole basis of the legislation was unsound."
