= Poor Law Amendment Act 1834 =

Act of the Parliament of the United Kingdom

Poor Law Amendment Act 1834 (Note: The citation of this act by this short title was authorised by section 1 of, and the first schedule to, the Short Titles Act 1896. Due to the repeal of those provisions it is now authorised by section 19(2) of the Interpretation Act 1978.)
- Act of Parliament
- Parliament of the United Kingdom
- Long title: An Act for the Amendment and better Administration of the Laws relating to the Poor in England and Wales
- Citation: 4 & 5 Will. 4. c. 76
- Territorial extent: United Kingdom

Dates
- Royal assent: 14 August 1834
- Commencement: 14 August 1834 (Note: The Acts of Parliament (Commencement) Act 1793.)
- Repealed: 10 March 1966
Other legislation
Repeals/revokes	Poor Relief Act 1601; Relief of the Poor Act 1795
Amended by	Union Chargeability Act 1865; Metropolitan Poor Act 1867; Statute Law Revision Act 1874; Summary Jurisdiction Act 1884; Lunacy Act 1890; Public Authorities Protection Act 1893; Local Government Act 1894; Poor Law Act 1927; Statute Law Revision Act 1950; Statute Law Revision Act 1959
Repealed by	Statute Law Revision Act 1966

Status: Repealed

Text of statute as originally enacted

The Poor Law Amendment Act 1834 (4 & 5 Will. 4. c. 76) (PLAA) known widely as the New Poor Law, was an act of the Parliament of the United Kingdom passed by the Whig government of Earl Grey denying the right of the poor to subsistence. It completely replaced earlier legislation based on the Poor Relief Act 1601 (43 Eliz. 1. c. 2) and attempted to fundamentally change the poverty relief system in England and Wales (similar changes were made to the Scottish poor laws in 1845). It resulted from the 1832 Royal Commission into the Operation of the Poor Laws, which included Edwin Chadwick, John Bird Sumner and Nassau William Senior. Chadwick was dissatisfied with the law that resulted from his report. The Act was passed two years after the Representation of the People Act 1832 which extended the franchise to middle-class men. Some historians have argued that this was a major factor in the PLAA being passed.

The act has been described as "the classic example of the fundamental Whig-Benthamite reforming legislation of the period". Its theoretical basis was Thomas Malthus's principle that population increased faster than resources unless checked, the "iron law of wages" and Jeremy Bentham's doctrine that people did what was pleasant and would tend to claim relief rather than working.

The act was intended to curb the cost of poor relief and address abuses of the old system, prevalent in southern agricultural counties, by enabling a new system to be brought in. Under this system, relief would only be given in workhouses, and conditions in workhouses would be such as to deter any but the truly destitute from applying for relief. The act was passed by large majorities in Parliament, with only a few Radicals (such as William Cobbett) voting against. The act was implemented, but the full rigours of the intended system were never applied in Northern industrial areas; however, the apprehension contributed to the social unrest of the period.

The importance of the Poor Law declined with the rise of the welfare state in the 20th century. In 1948, the PLAA was repealed by the National Assistance Act 1948 (11 & 12 Geo. 6. c. 29), which created the National Assistance Board to act as a residual relief agency.

== 1832 Royal Commission's findings ==
Alarmed at the cost of poor relief in the southern agricultural districts of England (where, in many areas, it had become a semi-permanent top-up of labourers' wages—the Allowance System, Roundsman System, or Speenhamland System), Parliament had set up the 1832 Royal Commission into the Operation of the Poor Laws. The commission's findings were that the old system was badly and expensively run. The commission's recommendations were based on two principles. The first was less eligibility: conditions within workhouses should be made worse than the worst conditions outside of them so that workhouses served as a deterrent, and only the neediest would consider entering them. The other was the "workhouse test": relief should only be available in the workhouse. Migration of rural poor to the city to find work was a problem for urban ratepayers under this system, since it raised their poor rates. The commission's report recommended sweeping changes:

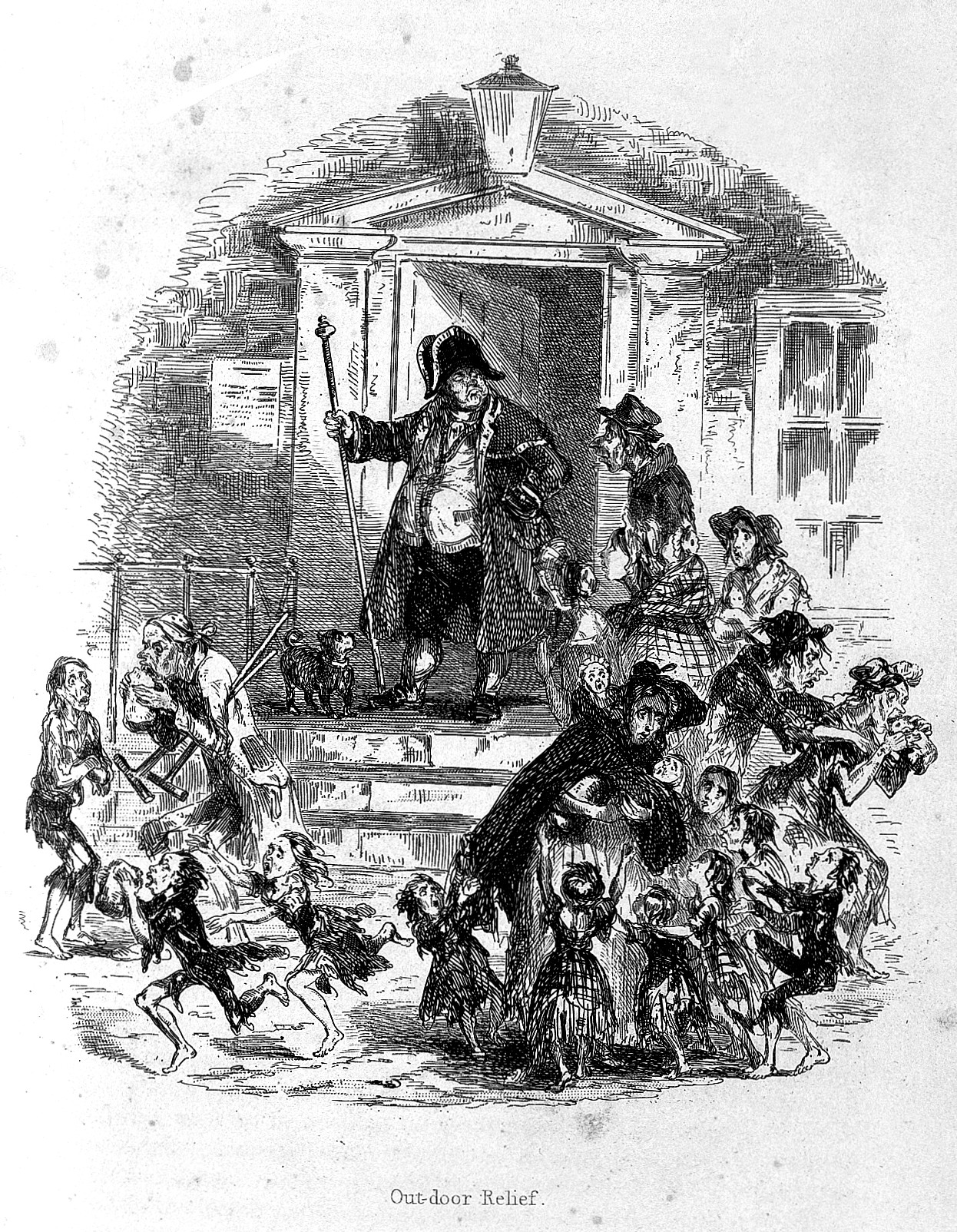
Outdoor relief: Poor people coming to a workhouse for food, c. 1840

- Outdoor relief should cease; relief should be given only in workhouses, and upon such terms that only the truly indigent would accept it. "Into such a house none will enter voluntarily; work, confinement, and discipline, will deter the indolent and vicious; and nothing but extreme necessity will induce any to accept the comfort which must be obtained by the surrender of their free agency, and the sacrifice of their accustomed habits and gratifications."

Whilst this recommendation was a solution to existing problems consistent with "political economy", there was little consideration in the report of what new problems it might give rise to. There was little practical experience to support it; only four of the parishes reporting had entirely abolished out-relief, and their problem cases could well have simply been displaced to neighbouring parishes.

- Different classes of paupers should be segregated; to this end, parishes should pool together in unions, with each of their poorhouses dedicated to a single class of paupers and serving the whole of the union. "[T]he separation of man and wife was necessary, in order to ensure the proper regulation of workhouses".

In practice, most existing workhouses were ill-suited to the new system (characterised by opponents as locking up the poor in "Poor Law bastilles"), and many poor law unions soon found that they needed a new purpose-built union workhouse. Their purpose being to securely confine large numbers of the lower classes at low cost, they not unnaturally looked much like prisons.

- The new system would be undermined if different unions treated their paupers differently; there should therefore be a central board with powers to specify standards and to enforce those standards; this could not be done directly by Parliament because of the legislative workload that would ensue.

This arrangement was simultaneously justified as required to give absolute uniformity country-wide and as allowing regulations to be tailored to local circumstances without taking up Parliament's time.

- Mothers of an illegitimate child should receive much less support; poor-law authorities should no longer attempt to identify the fathers of illegitimate children and recover the costs of child support from them.

It was argued that penalising fathers of illegitimate children reinforced pressures for the parents of children conceived out of wedlock to marry, and generous payments for illegitimate children indemnified the mother against failure to marry. "The effect has been to promote bastardy; to make want of chastity on the woman's part the shortest road to obtaining either a husband or a competent maintenance; and to encourage extortion and perjury".

== Doctrines ==
=== Malthusianism ===
Malthus' An Essay on the Principle of Population set out the influential doctrine that population growth was exponential, and that, unless checked, population increased faster than the ability of a country to feed it. This pressure explained the existence of poverty, which he justified theologically as a force for self-improvement and abstention. He saw any assistance to the poor—such as given by the old poor laws—as self-defeating, temporarily removing the pressure of want from the poor while leaving them free to increase their families, thus leading to a greater number of people in want and an apparently greater need for relief. His views were influential and hotly debated without always being understood, and opposition to the old Poor Law which peaked between 1815 and 1820 was described by both sides as "Malthusian".

Of those serving on the Commission, the economist Nassau William Senior identified his ideas with Malthus while adding more variables, and Bishop John Bird Sumner as a leading Evangelical was more persuasive than Malthus himself in incorporating the Malthusian principle of population into the Divine Plan, taking a less pessimistic view and describing it as producing benefits such as the division of property, industry, trade and European civilisation.

=== Iron law of wages ===
David Ricardo's "iron law of wages" held that aid given to poor workers under the old Poor Law to supplement their wages had the effect of undermining the wages of other workers, so that the Roundsman System and Speenhamland system led employers to reduce wages, and needed reform to help workers who were not getting such aid and rate-payers whose poor-rates were going to subsidise low-wage employers.

=== Utilitarianism ===
Edwin Chadwick, a major contributor to the Commission's report, developed Jeremy Bentham's theory of utilitarianism, the idea that the success of something could be measured by whether it secured the greatest happiness for the greatest number of people. This idea of utilitarianism underpinned the Poor Law Amendment Act. Bentham believed that "the greatest good for the greatest number" could only be achieved when wages found their true levels in a free-market system. Chadwick believed that the poor rate would reach its "correct" level when the workhouse was seen as a deterrent and fewer people claimed relief. A central authority was needed to ensure a uniform poor law regime for all parishes and to ensure that that regime deterred applications for relief; that is, to ensure a free market for labour required greater state intervention in poor relief.

Bentham's argument that people chose pleasant options and would not do what was unpleasant provided a rationale for making relief unpleasant so that people would not claim it, "stigmatising" relief so that it became "an object of wholesome horror".

== Terms ==
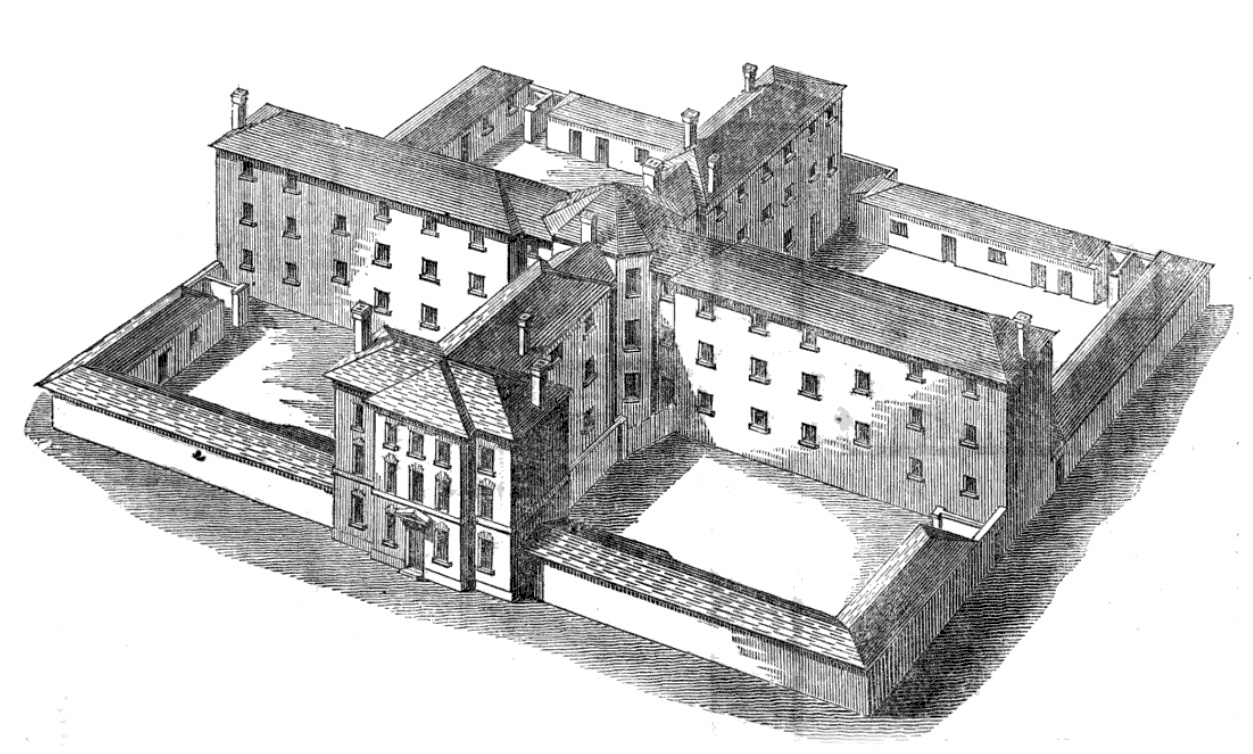
A "Poor Law Bastille": 1835 model design of a workhouse to hold 300 paupers.

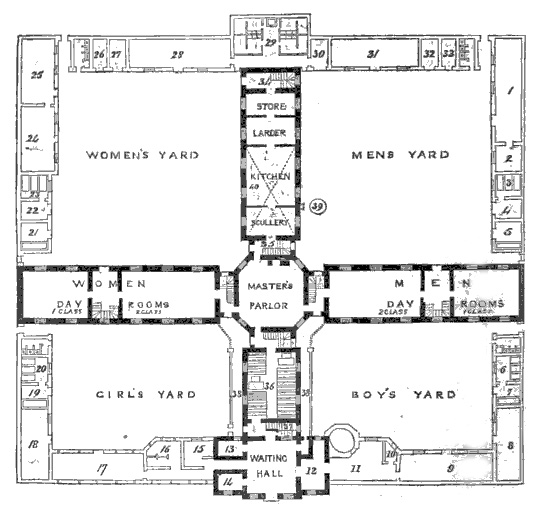
... 'classified' (men, women, girls, boys) and segregated accordingly

When the act was introduced, it did not legislate for a detailed Poor Law regime. Instead, it set up a three-man Poor Law Commission, an "at arms' length" quango to which Parliament delegated the power to make appropriate regulations, without making any provision for effective oversight of the commission's doings. Local poor-rates payers still elected their local board of Poor Law guardians and still paid for local poor law provisions, but those provisions could be specified to the board of guardians by the Poor Law Commission; where they were, the views of the local rate-payers were irrelevant. The principles upon which the commission was to base its regulations were not specified. The workhouse test and the idea of "less eligibility" were therefore never mentioned. "Classification of paupers" was neither specified nor prohibited (during passage of the act, an amendment by William Cobbett forbidding the separation of man and wife had been defeated), and the recommendation of the royal commission that "outdoor relief" (relief given outside of a workhouse) should be abolished was reflected only in a clause that any outdoor relief should only be given under a scheme submitted to and approved by the commissioners.

The Poor Law Commission was independent of Parliament, but conversely, since none of its members sat in Parliament, it had no easy way of defending itself against criticism in Parliament. It was recognised that individual parishes would not have the means to erect or maintain workhouses suitable for implementing the policies of "no outdoor relief" and segregation and confinement of paupers; consequently, the commission was given powers to order the formation of Poor Law unions (confederations of parishes) large enough to support a workhouse. The commission was empowered to overturn any unions previously established under Relief of the Poor Act 1782, but only if at least two-thirds of the union's guardians supported this. Each union was to have a board of guardians elected by rate-payers and property owners; those with higher rateable-value property were to have multiple votes, as for the select vestries set up under Sturges-Bourne's Acts. The commission had no powers to insist that unions built new workhouses (except where a majority of guardians or rate-payers had given written consent), but they could order improvements to be made to existing ones. The commission was explicitly given powers to specify the number and salaries of Poor Law Board employees and to order their dismissal. It could order the "classification" of workhouse inmates and specify the extent to which (and conditions under which) outdoor relief could be given.

Clause 15 of the act gave the commission sweeping powers:

That from and after the passing of this Act the Administration of Relief to the Poor throughout England and Wales, according to the existing Laws, or such Laws as shall be in force at the Time being, shall be subject to the Direction and Control of the said Commissioners; and for executing the Powers given to them by this Act the said Commissioners shall and are hereby authorized and required, from Time to Time as they shall see Occasion, to make and Issue all such Rules, Orders, and Regulations for the Management of the Poor, for the Government of Workhouses and the Education of the Children therein, ... and for the apprenticing the Children of poor Persons, and for the Guidance and Control of all Guardians, Vestries, and Parish Officers, so far as relates to the Management or Relief of the Poor, and the keeping, examining, auditing, and allowing of Accounts, and making and entering into Contracts in all Matters relating to such Management or Relief, or to any Expenditure for the Relief of the Poor, and for carrying this Act into execution in all other respects, as they shall think proper; and the said Commissioners may, at their Discretion, from Time to Time suspend, alter, or rescind such Rules, Orders, and Regulations, or any of them: Provided always, that nothing in this Act contained shall be construed as enabling the said Commissioners or any of them to interfere in any individual Case for the Purpose of ordering Relief.

General Rules could only be made by the commissioners themselves and had to be notified to a Secretary of State. Any new General Rules had to be laid before Parliament at the start of the next session. General Rules were those issued to the guardians of more than one union. Therefore, there was no provision for parliamentary scrutiny of policy changes (e.g., on the extent to which outdoor relief would be permitted) affecting a number of Poor Law unions, provided these were implemented by separate directives to each Union involved.

The act specified penalties which could be imposed upon persons failing to comply with the directives of the Poor Law Commission (£5 on first offence; £20 for second offence, fine and imprisonment on the third offence). However, it did not identify any means of penalising parishes or unions which had not formed a legally constituted board of guardians. Poor Law unions were to be the necessary administrative unit for the civil registration of births, marriages and deaths introduced in 1837.

The act did give paupers some rights. Lunatics could not be held in a workhouse for more than a fortnight; workhouse inmates could not be forced to attend religious services of a denomination other than theirs (nor could children be instructed in a religious creed objected to by their parent(s)); they were to be allowed to be visited by a minister of their religion.

== Implementation ==
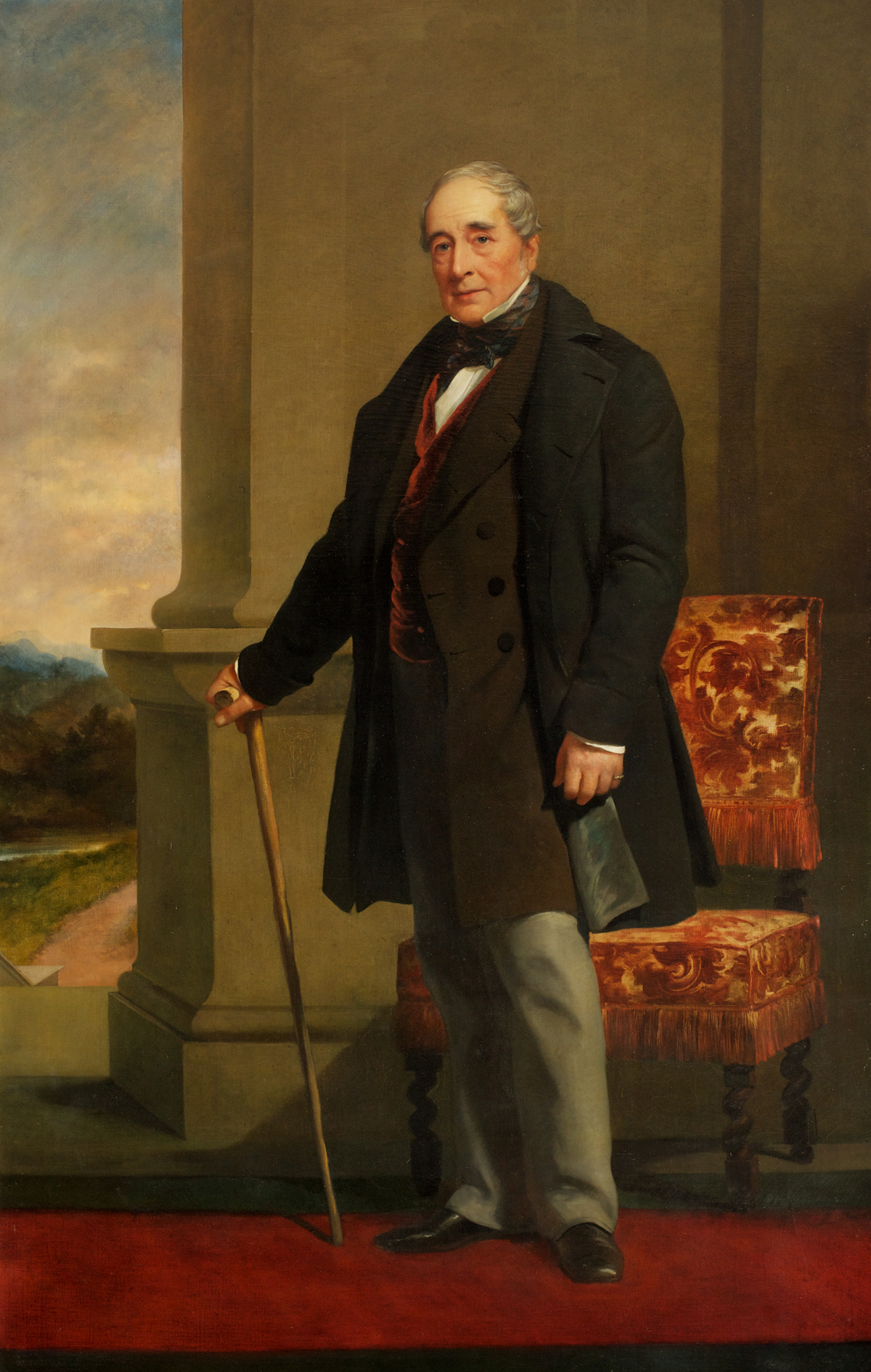
One of the "Somerset House Despots": Sir Thomas Frankland Lewis, Chairman of Poor Law Commission 1834–39

The central body set up to administer the new system was the Poor Law Commission. The commission worked in Somerset House, hence were called such as The Bashaws of Somerset House It was initially made up of Thomas Frankland Lewis, former Tory MP, George Nicholls, Overseer of the old system and John George Shaw Lefevre a lawyer, while Chadwick, an author of the Royal Commission's report was Secretary.

The commission's powers allowed it to specify policies for each Poor Law union, and policy did not have to be uniform. Implementation of the New Poor Law administrative arrangements was phased in, starting with the Southern counties whose problems the act had been designed to address. There was a gratifying reduction in poor-rates, but also horror tales of paupers ill-treated or relief refused. Some paupers were induced to migrate from the Southern to Northern towns, leading to a suspicion in the North that the New Poor Law was intended to drive wages down. By 1837, when roll-out of the new arrangements reached the textile districts of Lancashire and Yorkshire, trade was in recession. The usual response to this was for hours of work to be reduced, with pay reducing correspondingly and outdoor relief being given to those who could not make ends meet on short-time earnings. This was clearly incompatible with a policy of "no outdoor relief", and, despite assurances from the Poor Law Commission that there was no intention to apply that policy in the textile districts, they were not believed and a number of textile towns resisted (or rioted in response to) efforts to introduce the new arrangements. This resistance was eventually overcome, but outdoor relief was never abolished in many Northern districts, although the possibility existed. Policy officially changed after the passing of the Outdoor Labour Test Order, which "allowed" outdoor relief.

== Problematic consequences ==
After 1834, Poor Law policy aimed to transfer unemployed rural workers to urban areas where there was work, and protect urban ratepayers from paying too much.

It was impossible to achieve both these aims, as the principle of less eligibility made people search for work in towns and cities. Workhouses were built and paupers transferred to these urban areas. However, the Settlement Laws were used to protect ratepayers from paying too much. Workhouse construction and the amalgamation of unions was slow. Outdoor relief did continue after the PLAA was introduced. The board issued further edicts on outdoor relief: The Outdoor Labour Test Order and the Outdoor Relief Prohibitory Order.

The implementation of the act proved impossible, particularly in the industrial north which suffered from cyclical unemployment. The cost of implementing the Settlement Laws in operation since the 17th century was also high and so these were not implemented fully: it often proved too costly to enforce the removal of paupers. The commission could issue directives, but these were often not implemented fully and in some cases ignored in order to save on expenses. Darwin Leadbitter (1782–1840) was in charge of the commission's finances.

The PLAA was implemented differently and unevenly across England and Wales. One of the criticisms of the Poor Relief Act 1601 had been its varied implementation. The law was also interpreted differently in different parishes, as these areas varied widely in their economic prosperity, and the levels of unemployment experienced within them, leading to an uneven system. Local Boards of Guardians also interpreted the law to suit the interests of their own parishes, resulting in an even greater degree of local variation.

The poor working-class, including the agricultural labourers and factory workers, also opposed the New Poor Law Act, because the diet in workhouses was inadequate to sustain workers' health and nutrition. The Times even named this act as "the starvation act." Even more, the act forced workers to relocate to the locations of workhouses, which separated families.

== Opposition ==
Charles Dickens' novel Oliver Twist harshly criticises the Poor Law. In 1835 sample dietary tables were issued by the Poor law Commissioners for use in union workhouses. Dickens details the meagre diet of Oliver’s workhouse and points it up in the famous scene of the boy asking for more. Dickens also comments sarcastically on the notorious measure which consisted in separating married couples on admission to the workhouse: "instead of compelling a man to support his family [they] took his family from him, and made him a bachelor! " Like the other children, Oliver was "denied the benefit of exercise" and compelled to carry out the meaningless task of untwisting and picking old ropes although he had been assured that he would be "educated and taught a useful trade."

In the North of England particularly, there was fierce resistance; the local people considered that the existing system there was running smoothly. They argued that the nature of cyclical unemployment meant that any new workhouse built would be empty for most of the year and thus a waste of money. However, the unlikely union between property owners and paupers did not last, and opposition, though fierce, eventually petered out. In some cases, this was further accelerated as the protests very successfully undermined parts of the Amendment Act and became obsolete.

Fierce hostility and organised opposition from workers, politicians and religious leaders eventually led to the Amendment Act being amended, removing the very harsh measures of the workhouses to a certain degree. The Andover workhouse scandal of the mid-1840s, in which conditions in the Andover Union Workhouse were found to be inhumane and dangerous, prompted investigation by a Commons select committee, whose report commented scathingly on the dysfunctionality of the Poor Law Commission.

In 1847, government legislation replaced the Poor Law Commission with a Poor Law Board under much closer government supervision and parliamentary scrutiny.

== Impact ==
According to a 2019 study, the 1834 welfare reform had no impact on rural wages, labour mobility or the fertility rate of the poor. The study concludes, "this deliberately-induced suffering gained little for the land and property owners who funded poor relief. Nor did it raise wages for the poor, or free up migration to better opportunities in the cities. One of the first great triumphs of the new discipline of Political Economy, the reform of the Poor Laws, consequently had no effects on economic growth and economic performance in Industrial Revolution England."

== Subsequent developments ==
Section 104 of the act was repealed by section 2 of, and the schedule to, the Public Authorities Protection Act 1893 (56 & 57 Vict. c. 61), which came into force on 1 January 1894.

In section 86 of the act, the words " or appointment of any officer " and from " nor the appointment " to " the poor rate " were repealed by section 1(1) of, and the first schedule to, the Statute Law Revision Act 1950 (14 Geo. 6. c. 6), which came into force on 23 May 1950.

The preamble to, and sections 85, 86 and 109, with the exception of the definition of " poor rate ", were repealed by section 2 of, and the second schedule to, the Statute Law Revision Act 1959 (7 & 8 Eliz. 2. c. 68), which came into force on 29 July 1959.

The whole act was repealed by section 1 of, and the schedule to, the Statute Law Revision Act 1966, which came into force on 10 March 1966.

== See also ==
- English Poor Laws
- Tudor poor laws
- UK labour law
- Poor relief, worldwide
- History of the welfare state in the United Kingdom
