= Abstinence (disambiguation) =

Abstinence is a voluntary restraint from indulging a desire or appetite for certain bodily activities that are widely experienced as giving pleasure.

Abstinence may also refer to:

- Abstinence (band), an experimental industrial music project
- "The Abstinence", a Seinfeld episode
- Abstinence theory of interest in classical economics
