= Sturdy beggar =

Non-handicapped beggar in English law

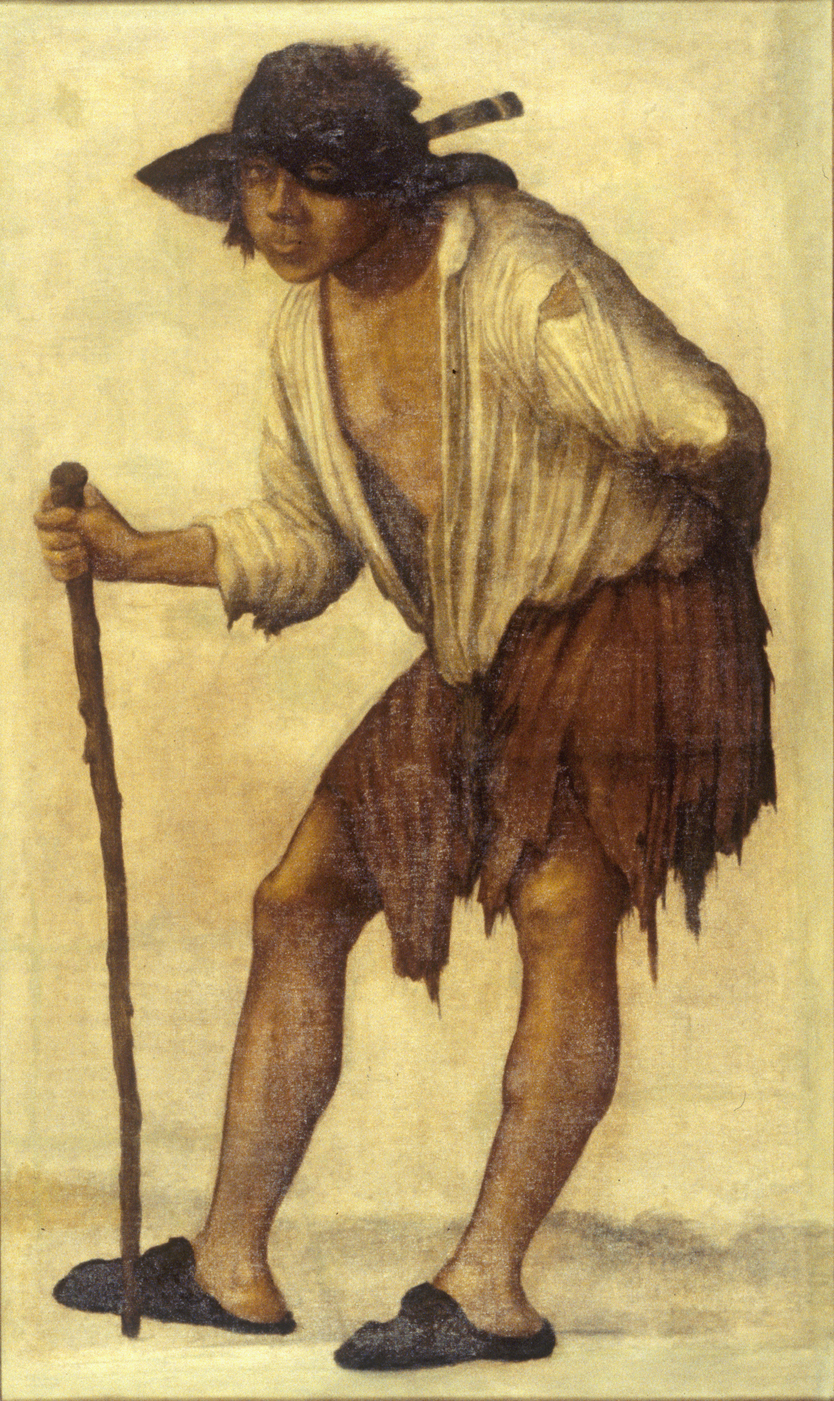
The Beggar looking through his hat in the Walters Art Museum, Baltimore, attributed to Jacques Bellange.

In historical English law, a sturdy beggar was a person who was fit and able to work, but begged or wandered for a living instead. The Statute of Cambridge 1388 was an early law which differentiated between sturdy beggars and the infirm (handicapped or elderly) poor. The Vagabonds and Beggars Act 1494 listed restrictions and punishments.

In the 1530s and into the 1540s, many English monasteries were closed, reducing resources available to the poor, and the Vagabonds Act 1530 empowered justices of the peace to issue licences to those unable to work, making begging by persons able to work a crime.

Types of sturdy beggar included the Tom o'Bedlam, who would pretend to be mad and follow people around. People would give him money to go away. The bristler used loaded dice that would land on any number he chose. This way, he could cheat at dice. The Counterfeit Crank would use soap to foam at the mouth, and pretend to have violent fits so that people may give money out of empathy.

Unemployment carried the death penalty on repeat offences. In 16th-century England, no distinction was made between vagrants and the jobless; both were simply categorised as "sturdy beggars", who were to be punished and moved on. In 1547, a bill was passed that subjected vagrants to some of the more extreme provisions of the criminal law: two years' servitude and branding with a "V" as the penalty for the first offence and death for the second.

== See also ==
- Aggressive panhandling

== External resources ==
- Poor Law Origins
