= Chamberlain Circular =

The Chamberlain Circular was a circular issued in 1886 in the United Kingdom by the Local Government Board. It encouraged the setting up of work relief projects in times of high unemployment. It is evidence of a move away from the Poor Law system. The circular takes its name from the Liberal Unionist politician Joseph Chamberlain.
