= Henry Gawler =

English barrister

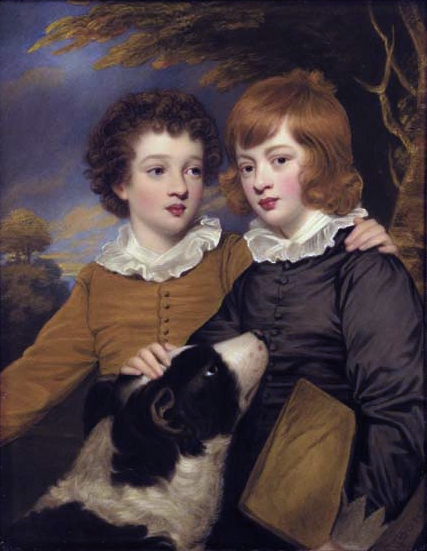
Henry Gawler (l.) as child with his brother John. (Henry Bone)

Henry Gawler (1766–1852) was an English barrister. Gawler was one of seven people who wrote the Royal Commission into the Operation of the Poor Laws 1832, a report which recommended changes to the Poor Law system in England and Wales. Three portraits of him as a schoolboy appear in the National Portrait Gallery, London.
