= Abstinence theory of interest =

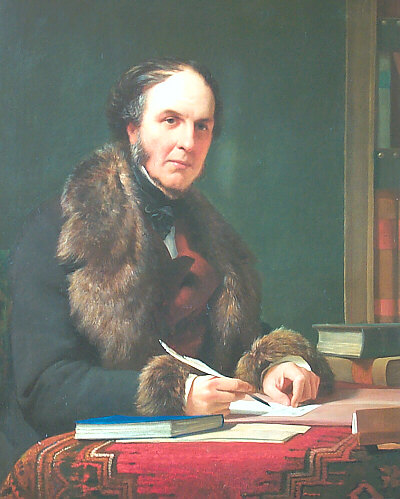
Nassau William Senior

The abstinence theory of interest asserts that the money used for lending purposes is the money not used for consumption – which means, earning interest by abstaining from spending makes the funds possible and available for borrowers.

The originator of the theory is Nassau William Senior.

== Senior's argument ==
Senior presented the idea in his lectures at the University of Oxford and in his Outline of the Science of Political Economy. He described abstinence as the conduct of a person who refrains from using what he controls for unproductive purposes, or who prefers distant results to immediate ones, and he counted it as a source of production alongside labour and natural agents. Because giving up present enjoyment is a sacrifice, Senior held that it has to be rewarded, and he identified that reward as the profit of capital, or interest.

== Interpretation ==
Many later writers have read Senior as saying that abstinence is the cause of interest, so that interest is the payment for abstaining. Gootzeit (1992) lists several authors who describe his view this way, including Bowley, Conard, and Ekelund and Hébert.
