= Smash Up the Workhouse! =

1911 political pamphlet

Smash Up the Workhouse! was a pamphlet published in 1911 by Labour Party politician George Lansbury. It argued for the abolition of the workhouse system.
