= Outdoor Labour Test Order =

The Outdoor Labour Test Order was a piece of policy issued by the Poor Law Commission on 13 April 1842 which allowed the use of outdoor relief to the able-bodied poor. The order was issued after there was some opposition to the commission's previous order stating that only indoor relief should be used.

During times when the manufacturing industries were performing poorly this became impractical; however, the Poor Law Amendment Act 1834 had aimed to prevent the use of outdoor relief, and replace it with indoor relief.

== See also ==
- Outdoor Relief Prohibitory Order
