= Huddersfield workhouse scandal =

UK 1848 poor law scandal

Coordinates: 53.6564°N 1.7917°W

The Huddersfield workhouse scandal concerned the conditions in the workhouse at Huddersfield, England in 1848. The problems included overcrowding, disease, food, and sanitation, among others. A report, for instance, described the workhouse as "wholly unfitted for residence for the many scores that are continually crowded into it, unless it be that desire to engender endemic and fatal disease. And this Huddersfield workhouse is by far the best in the whole union."

On investigation, the conditions at Huddersfield were considered to be worse than those in Andover which had hit the headlines in Britain two years earlier. This previous scandal gained notoriety due to extreme abuses with accounts citing workhouse inmates getting so hungry they had resorted to chewing on the bones that they were grinding down for fertilizer. These two incidents contributed to the growth of demands for social reform as reflected by later developments such as the intensified public discourse on the Poor Law.
