= Workhouse test =

Non-implemented restriction on welfare (U.K.)

The workhouse test was a condition of the Poor Law Amendment Act 1834. It stated that anyone who wanted to get poor relief must enter a workhouse. The condition was never implemented in Britain and outdoor relief continued to be given. The intended purpose was to make the workhouses as undesirable as possible so that people would look for work elsewhere before attempting to receive indoor relief. The "test" itself was, in essence, were the people who wanted relief desperate enough to enter the workhouse, despite the conditions.
