= Pauperism =

State of being supported at the public expense

Pauperism (from Latin pauper 'poor'; Welsh: tlotyn) is the condition of being a "pauper", i.e. receiving relief administered under the Irish and English Poor Laws. From this, pauperism can also be more generally the state of being supported at public expense, within or outside of almshouses, and still more generally, of dependence for any considerable period on charitable assistance, public or private. In this sense, pauperism is to be distinguished from general poverty or the state of being a poor, although the two concepts overlap.

== History ==
Under the English Poor Laws, a person to be relieved must be a destitute person, and the moment he had been relieved he became a pauper, and as such incurred certain civil disabilities. Statistics dealing with the state of pauperism in this sense convey not the amount of destitution actually prevalent, but the particulars of people in receipt of poor law relief.

The 1830s brought to Europe great economic hardships. The early 19th century saw a tremendous rise in the populations of all the European countries. There was a scarcity of jobs and fewer employment opportunities. This resulted in more job seekers than employment. Populations from rural areas migrated to bigger towns to live in increasingly crowded slums. Small producers in town faced tough competition from cheap imported goods in England, where industrialization was comparatively superior. In those regions of Europe where aristocracy was strong and enjoyed privileges, peasants groaned under the burden of hardships. A year of bad harvest added to the miseries of the common man. The rise of food prices led to widespread pauperism.

Poverty in the interwar years (1918–1939) was responsible for several measures which largely killed off the Poor Law system. The Local Government Act 1929 officially abolished workhouses, and between 1929 and 1930 the poor law guardians, the "workhouse test," and the term "pauper" disappeared.

== Pauper apprentices ==
Pauper apprentices in England and Wales were the children of paupers who were bound out by the local parish overseers and churchwardens. Some had to travel long distances to serve in the factories of the Industrial Revolution, but the majority served their terms within a few miles of their homes.

== See also ==
- Culture of poverty
- Debtors Anonymous
- In forma pauperis
- Pauper's funeral
- Reserve army of labour
- Social exclusion
- Social stigma
- The Prince and the Pauper
- Working poor
