= Outdoor Relief Prohibitory Order =

1844 order to try to end poverty relief

The Outdoor Relief Prohibitory Order was an order from the Poor Law Commission issued on 21 December 1844 which aimed to end the distribution of outdoor relief to the able-bodied poor.

== See also ==
- Outdoor Labour Test Order
