= Allowance system =

System of poor relief in Britain

The allowance system was a system of poor relief in Britain during the 19th century. The allowance system allowed the able-bodied poor to get allowance to boost their wages.

== Sources ==
- Rosemary Rees, Poverty and Public Health 1815-1949, London, Heinemann (2001)
