= Less eligibility =

British workhouse conditions

Less eligibility was a British government policy passed into law in the Poor Law Amendment Act 1834. It stated that conditions in workhouses had to be worse than conditions available outside so that there was a deterrence to claiming poor relief. This meant that an individual had to be destitute to qualify for poor relief.

== Rationale ==
The developers of less eligibility were typically utilitarian in principle. They had no problem with the aged and genuinely infirm who could not work under any circumstances (in reality, a fairly limited number). Instead, they thought the problem was the larger numbers of the able-bodied who either could not or would not earn enough money to support themselves. It was perceived that paying money to this category would increase their number.

Jeremy Bentham argued: “If the condition of individuals, maintained without property of their own, by the labor of others, were rendered more eligible than that of persons maintained by their own labour… then individuals destitute of property would be continually withdrawing themselves from the class of persons maintained by their own labor, to the class of persons maintained by the labour of others."

John Stuart Mill concurred: "The foundation of the Poor Law Report, is the principle upon which all good government, and all justly-constituted society rest; that no person who is able to work, is entitled to be maintained in idleness; or to be put into a better condition, at the expense of the public, than those who contrive to support themselves by their unaided exertions. Any infringement of this principle, whether by rich or poor, is not only immoral, but nine-tenths of the immorality in the world are founded on it. The desire to live upon the labour of others, is at the root of almost all misgovernment, and of most private dishonesty."

== Limitations ==
Less eligibility did not apply to children, who were considered blameless for their poverty.

== Criticism ==
Bloy states that the separation of husbands and wives was the subject of "great hostility".
