= Statute of Cambridge 1388 =

Act of the Parliament of England

- Act of Parliament
- Parliament of England
- Long title: None
- Citation: 12 Ric. 2. c. 7
- Territorial extent: England and Wales; Ireland

Dates
- Royal assent: 17 October 1388
- Commencement: 9 September 1388 (Note: Start of session.)
- Repealed: England and Wales: 19 February 1624; Ireland: 10 August 1872

Other legislation
- Repealed by: England and Wales: Continuance, etc. of Laws Act 1623; Ireland: Statute Law (Ireland) Revision Act 1872

Status: Repealed

Text of statute as originally enacted

The Statute of Cambridge 1388 (12 Ric. 2. c. 7) was an act of the Parliament of England that placed restrictions on the movements of labourers and beggars. It prohibited any labourer from leaving the hundred, rape, wapentake, city, or borough where he was living, without a testimonial, showing reasonable cause for his departure, to be issued under the authority of the justices of the peace. Any labourer found wandering without such letter, was to be put in the stocks until he found surety to return to the town from which he came. Impotent persons were to remain in the towns in which they were living at the time of the act; or, if the inhabitants were unable or unwilling to support them, they were to withdraw to other towns within the hundred, rape, or wapentake, or to the towns where they were born.

The act is often regarded as the first poor law, for within its many restrictions each county "hundred" was made responsible for relieving its own "impotent poor" who, because of age or infirmity, were incapable of work. However, lack of enforcement limited its effect.

== Subsequent developments ==
The act was extended to Ireland by Poynings' Law 1495 (10 Hen. 7. c. 22 (I)).

The whole act was repealed for England and Wales by section 11 of the Continuance, etc. of Laws Act 1623 (21 Jas. 1. c. 28).

The whole act was repealed for Ireland by section 1 of, and the schedule to, the Statute Law (Ireland) Revision Act 1872 (35 & 36 Vict. c. 98), which came into force on 10 August 1872.

== See also ==
- Cambridge Parliament
- Internal passport
