= Poor Law Board =

Government body that replaced the Poor Law Commission

The Poor Law Board was established in the United Kingdom in 1847 as a successor body to the Poor Law Commission overseeing the administration of the Poor Law Amendment Act 1834. The board was abolished in 1871 and replaced by the Local Government Board. The new body was headed by a president, and with the Lord President of the Council, the Lord Privy Seal, the Home Secretary and the Chancellor of the Exchequer now added to the board as ex officio members.

== Presidents of the Poor Law Board, 1847–1871 ==
- Charles Buller 1847–1848
- Matthew Talbot Baines 1849–1852
- Sir John Trollope, Bt 1852
- Matthew Talbot Baines 1852–1855
- Edward Pleydell Bouverie 1855–1858
- Thomas Sotheron-Estcourt 1858–1859
- Charles Gordon-Lennox, Earl of March 1859
- Charles Pelham Villiers 1859–1866
- Gathorne Hardy 1866–1867
- William Courtenay, 11th Earl of Devon 1867–1868
- George Goschen 1868–1871
- James Stansfeld 1871

== Parliamentary Secretaries to the Poor Law Board, 1847–1871 ==
- Viscount Ebrington 1847–1851
- Ralph William Grey 1851–1852
- Frederick Knight 1852
- Grenville Berkeley 1853–1856
- Ralph Grey 1856–1858
- Frederick Knight 1858–1859
- Charles Gilpin 1859–1865
- Viscount Enfield 1865–1866
- Ralph Anstruther Earle 1866–1867
- George Sclater-Booth 1867–1868
- Sir Michael Hicks Beach, Bt 1868
- Arthur Peel 1868–1871

== Bibliography ==
- Una and Her Paupers Florence Nightingale & Anon, Diggory Press ISBN 978-1-905363-22-3
