= Local Government Board =

British government body from 1871 to 1919

Local Government Board Act 1871 (Note: Section 1.)
- Act of Parliament
- Parliament of the United Kingdom
- Long title: An Act for constituting a Local Government Board, and vesting therein certain functions of the Secretary of State and Privy Council concerning the Public Health and Local Government, together with the powers and duties of the Poor Law Board.
- Citation: 34 & 35 Vict. c. 70
- Territorial extent: United Kingdom

Dates
- Royal assent: 14 August 1871
- Commencement: 14 August 1871 (Note: The Acts of Parliament (Commencement) Act 1793.)
- Repealed: 2 May 1986

Other legislation
- Amended by: Local Government Act 1933; Public Health Act 1936; Statute Law (Repeals) Act 1978
- Repealed by: Statute Law (Repeals) Act 1986

Status: Repealed

Text of statute as originally enacted

The Local Government Board (LGB) was a British Government supervisory body overseeing local administration in England and Wales from 1871 to 1919.

The LGB was created by the Local Government Board Act 1871 (34 & 35 Vict. c. 70) and took over the public health and local government responsibilities of the Home Secretary and the Privy Council and all the functions of the Poor Law Board, which was abolished.

In 1919 the LGB was converted into a new department called the Ministry of Health.

== Membership ==
The board was headed by a president, appointed by and serving at the pleasure of the British monarch. The president was permitted to hold a seat and vote in the House of Commons, and the position was generally held by a cabinet minister.

In addition the board had a number of ex officio members consisting of the Lord President of the Council, the Principal Secretaries of State, the Lord Privy Seal and the Chancellor of the Exchequer. The ex officio members were not paid a salary. The board itself seldom met, with policy being decided by the president of the board. He was assisted by a parliamentary secretary (a member of the Commons), and a permanent secretary (a civil servant). The practical work of the LGB was carried out by its salaried officers.

== Officers ==
The Local Government Board was permitted to appoint such secretaries, assistant secretaries, inspectors, auditors, clerks, messengers, "and other officers" as they deemed fit, subject to the approval of the treasury. Salaries paid to officers were required to be confirmed by Parliament. On the formation of the LGB, the existing staff of the Poor Law Board, the Local Government Act Office and the Medical Department of the Privy Council were transferred to the new body.

== Powers and duties ==
The purpose of the LGB was stated to be "the supervision of the laws relating to the public health, the relief of the poor, and local government". The act establishing the board listed the duties transferred from existing authorities under various acts of parliament:

- Transferred from the Home Office:
  - Registration of births, deaths, and marriages (Births and Deaths Registration Act 1836, Births and Deaths Registration Act 1837)
  - Public health (Public Health Act 1848)
  - Local government (Local Government Act 1858, Local Government Act (1858) Amendment Act 1861, Local Government Amendment Act 1863)
  - Drainage and sanitary matters (Sewage Utilization Act 1865, Sanitary Act 1866, Sewage Utilization Act 1867, Sanitary Act 1868, Sanitary Loans Act 1869)
  - Baths and wash-houses (Baths and Washhouses Act 1846, Baths and Washhouses Act 1847)
  - Public improvements (Public Improvements Act 1860)
  - Towns improvement (Towns Improvement Clauses Act 1847)
  - Artisans and labourers' dwellings (Artizans and Labourers Dwellings Act 1868 (31 & 32 Vict. c. 130))
  - Returns of local taxation (Local Taxation Returns Act 1861)
- Transferred from the Privy Council:
  - Prevention of Disease (Public Health Act 1848, Diseases Prevention Act 1855, Public Health Act 1858, Public Health Act 1859, Nuisances Removal Act 1860, Sanitary Act 1866, Sanitary Act 1868)
  - Vaccination (Vaccination Act 1867)
- Transferred from the Poor Law Board
  - All powers and duties vested in or imposed on the Poor Law Board by the several acts of Parliament relating to the relief of the poor.

In 1872 the board received further responsibilities, when the Home Office transferred administration of the Turnpike and Highway Acts, Metropolitan Water Act 1852 and the Alkali Act 1863 to the LGB.

== Work of the board ==
The LGB carried out its work in the following ways:

=== Delegated legislation ===
The board was empowered to make general orders and regulations enforcing the various statutes for which it was responsible. These orders and regulations had the same force of law as those made by a secretary of state.

=== Inspection and regulation ===
The LGB had broad powers of regulation of the bodies under its control. The board's inspectors were able to visit local authorities and ensure that they were performing satisfactorily. They could also act as a medium for resolving disputes between local bodies and ratepayers or other interests.

=== Provisional orders ===
The board possessed quasi-judicial powers, being able to make legally binding decisions on the bodies under its supervision. Examples included the changing of boundaries, raising of loans or the taking on of additional powers. These provisional orders were subject to confirmation by Parliament.

=== Auditing and accountability ===
The board compiled and published financial summaries for each local authority annually. It also appointed district auditors and supplied such statistics as might be required by parliament.

== Abolition ==
The Ministry of Health Act 1919 (9 & 10 Geo. 5. c. 19) abolished the Local Government Board, and all of its powers and duties were transferred to a new department called the Ministry of Health, which also combined the duties of the Insurance Commissioners, the Welsh Insurance Commissioners, the medical duties of the Board of Education, the duties of the Privy Council under the Midwives Acts, and the powers of the Home Secretary in relation to the Children Act 1908 (8 Edw. 7. c. 67). Most of the Local Government Board staff transferred to the new ministry.

The powers which the Local Government Board had exercised in relation to roads were transferred to the Ministry of Transport during the period 1919 - 1921.

== See also ==
- Local Government Board for Scotland, a similar body in Scotland from 1894 – 1919
- Local Government Board for Ireland, established in 1872 and abolished in 1922.
