= Poor Law Commission =

Body established to administer poor relief

The Poor Law Commission was a body established to administer poor relief after the passing of the Poor Law Amendment Act 1834. The commission was made up of three commissioners who became known as "The Bashaws of Somerset House", their secretary and nine clerks or assistant commissioners. The commission lasted until 1847 when it was replaced by a Poor Law Board – the Andover workhouse scandal being one of the reasons for this change.

Edwin Chadwick, one of the writers of the 1832 royal commission hoped to become commissioner but instead only got the post of secretary. This caused clashes with the Poor Law Commissioners. This was one reason the Poor Law Commission was eventually abolished – there was too much infighting within the organisation.

== Powers ==
The Poor Law Commission was independent of Parliament. This made it vulnerable to criticism from those inside Parliament. In the parishes the commissioners were almost universally hated. The commission had the power to issue directives but there was no way to make parishes do what the commission wanted them to do. The commission however did have powers over dietaries for the workhouse and it could veto appointments to boards of guardians – therefore making it difficult for the parishes that opposed it.

== Implementation of the Poor Law ==
Edwin Chadwick, the Secretary to the Poor Law Commission, wanted the New Poor Law to be implemented at first in the north of England where, at that time, there were few economic problems: employment was high and food was plentiful. But the narrow base of the economy posed the problem that unemployment could fluctuate wildly. This made implementation of the act difficult as it was a physical impossibility to build a workhouse which could hold the large numbers affected by cyclical employment.

James Kay-Shuttleworth, an assistant commissioner supported the introduction of the Poor Law Amendment Act in the North and believed that pauperism was caused by the "recklesness [sic] and improvidence of the native population [and the] barbarism of the Irish."

== Poor Law Commissioners, 1834-1847 ==
Sir Thomas Frankland Lewis	18 August 1834	–	30 January 1839
John George Shaw Lefevre	18 August 1834	–	25 November 1841
Sir George Nicholls	18 August 1834	–	17 December 1847
Sir George Cornewall Lewis	30 January 1839	–	2 August 1847
Sir Edmund Walker Head	25 November 1841	–	17 December 1847
Edward Turner Boyd Twistleton	5 November 1845	–	23 July 1847
