= Outdoor relief =

Program of social welfare and poor relief

Outdoor relief, an obsolete term originating with the Elizabethan Poor Law (1601), was a programme of social welfare and poor relief. Assistance was given in the form of money, food, clothing or goods to alleviate poverty without the requirement that the recipient enter an institution. In contrast, recipients of indoor relief were required to enter an almshouse, orphanage, workhouse or poorhouse. Outdoor relief consisted of hot meals and provision of blankets and things necessary for homeless persons. Outdoor relief was also a feature of the Scottish Poor Laws and the Irish Poor Laws.
