= Frank Calvert =

British archaeologist

Frank Calvert

Frank Calvert (1828–1908) was an English consular official in the eastern Mediterranean region and an amateur archaeologist. He began exploratory excavations on the mound at Hisarlık (the site of the ancient city of Troy), seven years before the arrival of Heinrich Schliemann. After Calvert's initial archaeological research, Calvert and Schliemann worked together on the excavation of Troy, though Schliemann has often been given credit for the discoveries.

== Early life and education ==
Frank Calvert was born into an English Levantine family on Malta, at that time a British naval base, in 1828. He was the youngest of six sons and one daughter born to James Calvert (1778–1852) and Louisa Ann Lander (1792–1867). His mother was the sister of Charles Alexander Lander, James' business partner. In social standing they were of the aristocracy. His father was a distant relative of the Calverts, who had founded Baltimore, Maryland, and Louisa was a direct descendant of the Campbells of Argyll (Scottish clansmen). Not having inherited any wealth, his parents took to the colonies, married in Ottoman Smyrna in 1815, and settled in Malta, which had changed hands from the French colonial empire to the British Empire with the Treaty of Paris (1814). They associated with the "privileged" social circles of Malta, but they were poor. Frank's father James clerked in the mail and grain offices of the Civil Service.

== Career ==
Frank was overshadowed by his elder siblings and became involved with the careers of his elder, more flamboyant brothers. He remained unmarried, and had an enduring passion for the Homeric epics and a firm belief that the myths were history, not fiction.

In 1847, his brother Frederick had bought a farm of over 2,000 acres (8 km^{2}) at Akca Koy which included part of mound of Hisarlik in a momentous acquisition. As early as 1822, Hisarlik had been identified by Charles Maclaren as a possible site of Homeric Troy.

Frank supported his brothers' careers. In 1855, while Frederick was completely engrossed in affairs related to the Crimean War, Frank continued to produce the bulk of official consular correspondence in French and English. On occasion in 1856 and 1858, Frank stood in for Frederick as acting British consul. After standing in for his brother James, Frank in 1874 eventually succeeded him as United States Consular agent, an unpaid position that he held for the rest of his life. Occasionally, he served on local mixed European and Turkish tribunals, assuming from time to time the title of acting British consul.

Apart from performing his consular duties, Calvert carried on careful, exploratory excavations on the family-owned land which incorporated the mound of Hisarlik. He was convinced that this was the site of the ancient city of Troy. In 1908 he died and was never officially associated with the discovery of Troy.

=== Troy ===
In the field of archaeology, Calvert has been a mere shadow compared to his partner Heinrich Schliemann, who was later accused of manipulating and taking advantage of Calvert. Schliemann had a significantly larger budget than Calvert, and frequently used it to his advantage. Calvert was also shy about his educational experience because he was self-taught. At an early age he began visiting ancient sites, understanding different cultures and learning how they lived. In his teens he visited sites such as Corfu, Athens, Egypt, Brindisi and others, but he mostly stayed in the Troad, the region of Asia Minor believed to have been under Trojan rule.

At the time Schliemann began excavating in Turkey, the site commonly believed to be Troy was at Pınarbaşı, a hilltop at the south end of the Trojan Plain. Schliemann performed soundings at Pınarbaşı, but was disappointed by his findings. Schliemann did not know where to look for Troy and was about to give up his exploration altogether. It was not until Calvert suggested excavating the mound of Hissarlik that Schliemann made any moves to dig at the site. Calvert had already searched in the mound, but he never made it down to the Bronze Age layers; still, he was determined Troy was buried somewhere within the mound.

Schliemann and Calvert found not only the possible site of Troy but thousands of artefacts such as diadems of woven gold, rings, bracelets, intricate earrings and necklaces, buttons, belts and brooches as well as anthropomorphic figures, bowls and vessels for perfumed oils.

== Legacy ==
Calvert's work on Troy is mentioned in the 1985 BBC TV series In Search of the Trojan War, written and presented by Michael Wood.

In 1996 American and British heirs to Calvert sought ownership of a portion of the treasure found by Schliemann on Calvert's land (Calvert only owned half the mound).

== The Calverts ==
The family regarded itself as a single enterprise. They shared property, assisted each other, lived together and had common interests, one of which was the antiquities of the Troad. They did not do well in Malta, but in 1829 the Dardanelles region underwent an upswing of its business cycle due to historical circumstances. The Greek War of Independence was about to be concluded in favor of an independent state by the Treaty of Constantinople (1832). The Levant Company, which had had a monopoly on trade through the Dardanelles, was terminated. The price in pounds of the Turkish piastre fell. A manyfold increase in British traffic through straits was anticipated. A new type of job suddenly appeared: British Consul in the Dardanelles, which brought wealth with it. (Note: By Ottoman law every ship entering the Dardanelles from the Aegean must stop at Çanakkale to acquire one or more firmans or permissions for a fee. The total bill included other fees as well. The Turkish officials did not themselves service the ships. Instead they allowed each nation to hire a resident consul or consular agent to reside in Çanakkale and greet and service each ship as it came in. They were allowed to apply a schedule of consular fees in addition for this service. One individual might be an agent for more than one nation. Hard-working agents such as the Calverts grew rich on the fees, regardless of whether they were also paid a salary. Agents were not subject to Turkish law, but they might be removed if complaints of extortion or skimming the Turkish fees were made. The best and richest of the agents made themselves as charismatic as possible by living an ostentatious life, throwing parties and dinners, staging hunting expeditions, loaning money to the natives and just generally being charitable and sympathetic. Large numbers of these agents were soon found in most of the Mediterranean ports of the Ottoman Empire. It was a way to get rich quick. A recent study of these consular positions and men who filled them can be found in Levantine Heritage Foundation 2013)

=== Charles Lander ===
Charles Lander applied, and was made British Consul of the Dardanelles in 1829. He spoke five languages, knew the region well, and had the best connections. A row of new consular offices was being constructed in Çanakkale along the shore of the strait. He was at first poor. In 1833 he bought a house in town ample enough to invite his sister's sons to join him in the enterprise. Without exception they left home at 16 to be tutored in the trade at their uncle's house and placed in lucrative consular positions. Frederick, the eldest, stayed on to assist Charles. The youngest, Frank, at school in Athens, arrived last, but his interest in archaeology led him into a different career.

Çanakkale was a boom town. In 1831 Lander married Adele, a brief but idyllic relationship that gave them three daughters in quick succession. When the Calverts began to arrive, finding quarters in the crowded town proved to be difficult. The Turkish building code requiring buildings of wood, conflagrations were frequent. The family escaped one fire with nothing but the clothes they were wearing. Lander's collection of books on the Troad was totally destroyed. In 1840 Lander suffered a tragedy when his wife, Adele, died in her 40s, leaving three small children. He chose this time to settle his estate, making Frederick his legal heir, guardian of his children, and co-executor (along with himself).

Lander dedicated himself to the consular service, leaving the details of the estate and its responsibilities to Frederick. The family grew wealthy on the fees paid by the ships they serviced. When Frank arrived in 1845 with his sister he had nothing much to do. By this time the family had a new library. Using its books Frank explored the Troad. He and Lander became collectors. The women in the family took a supportive role as well.

=== Frederick Calvert ===
Lander died in 1846 of a fever endemic to the region, leaving Frederick as executor of the will and head of the family. In 1847 he assumed his uncle's consular position. He was also an agent of Lloyd's of London, which insured ship cargos. Despite Frank's youth he began to play an important role in the family consular business, especially when Frederick was away. A few years prior to the death of Lander, the population of Çanakkale was on the rise, from 10,000 in 1800 to 11,000 in 1842. The British numbered about 40 families. The increase in ship traffic meant prosperity for the Calverts, who expedited the ships of several nations, including the United States. They had other ambitions: James William Whittall, British consul in Smyrna, was spreading his doctrine of the "Trojan Colonization Society," (never more than an idea) which was influential on the Calverts, whom he visited.

==== Calvert investments in the Troad ====
In 1847 Frederick invested the profits of the family business in two large tracts in the Troad, amounting to many thousands of acres. (Note: Legally he was accessing the Lander money as trustee for the children. The properties were in his wife's name, as foreign males were not allowed to own real estate. Deeds were quitclaim.) He founded a company, Calvert Bros. and Co., an "extended family company." The first purchase was a farm at Erenköy, on the coast about half-way between Çanakkale and Troy. Frederick used it as a station for ships that could not make Çanakkale. The area was a target for Greek immigration. The family became money-lenders, lending only to Greeks at rates considered high (20%).

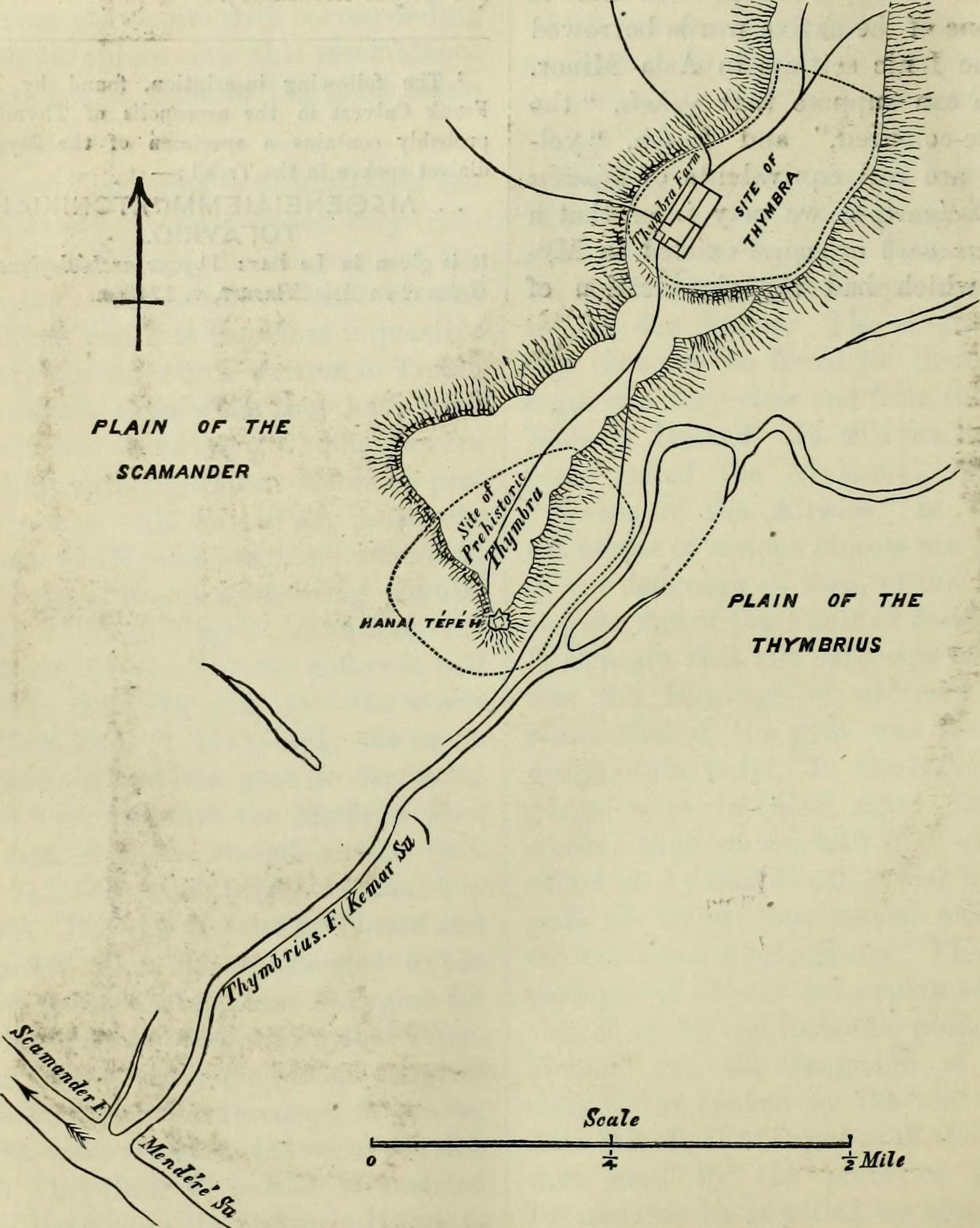
Frank Calvert's sketch of the location of Thymbra Farm on the right bank of Kemer Creek (the ancient Thymbria), a right tributary of the Scamander. Using it one can easily locate the farm, which was confiscated by the Turkish government in 1939 (again, as it was Turkish headquarters in the Battle of Gallipoli) and remains a government farm. The modern buildings are next to the old farm on the east. The village was redistricted out of existence, but it was never there during the Calvert tenure.

Frederick also bought a farm he intended to work, the Batak Farm (named for the Batak wetlands), later changed by Frank to Thymbra Farm, because he believed it was the site of Homeric Thymbra, after which the Thymbra Gate of Homeric Troy had been named. It was located at an abandoned village called Akça Köy, 6.4 km (4 mi) to the southeast of Hisarlik. The farm was the last of the village. It harvested and marketed the cups and acorns of Quercus macrolepis, the Valonia Oak, from which valonia, a compound used in dyeing and tanning, is extracted. The farm also raised cotton and wheat and bred horses. Frederick introduced the plough and drained the wetlands. The farm eventually became famous as a way station for archaeologists and the home of the Calvert collection of antiquities, which Frank kept locked in a hidden room. The main house, featuring multiple guest bedrooms, was situated on a low ridge in a compound with several outbuildings. It was more of a manor, operated by farm workers and domestic servants.

In 1850–1852 Frederick solved the residence problem by having a mansion built for him in Çanakkale. Two Turkish houses were said to have been put together, but Turkish houses were required to be of wood. This one was of massive stone, which was permitted to foreigners, and was placed partly on fill jetting into the straits. It probably was the length of two Turkish houses. It remained the major building of the town until it was removed in 1942, due to earlier earthquake damage. The last of the Calvert descendants still in the region had ceded it to the town in 1939. The Town Hall was then built on the site. The mansion's extensive gardens became a public park.

The entire family of the times took up permanent residence in the mansion, which was never finished. It was almost always occupied by visitors and social events. The Calverts began a tour-guide business, conducting visitors throughout the Troad. Frank was the chief guide. The women held musicales and sang in the salons. The house attracted a stream of distinguished visitors, each with a theory about the location of Troy. Frederick, however, was not there for the opening of the house. After a fall from a horse in 1851, complications forced him to seek medical care in London for 18 months, the first of a series of disasters. He was back by 1853.

==== Crimean War debacle ====
The Crimean War began in October 1853 and lasted through February 1856. Russia had arbitrarily occupied the Danube frontier of the Ottoman Empire including the Crimea, and Britain and France were providing military assistance to the Ottomans. The rear of the conflict was Istanbul and the Dardanelles. Britain relied heavily on the Levantine families for interfacing, intelligence, and guidance. Edmund Calvert was a British agent, but this was not Frederick's calling. Not long after his return the initial British expeditionary force of 10,000 men was held up in ships in the straits, with no place to bivouac, no supplies, and a commissariat of four non-Turkish speakers.

The British Army had reached a low point of efficiency since Wellington. Although it was the responsibility of Parliament, the fact that the crown retained the prerogative of command made them hesitate to update it, for fear of its being used against them. One of the major problems was the fragmentation of the administration into "a number of separate, distinct, and mutually independent authorities," with little centralization. There were always issues of who was in command and what they commanded. A Supply Corps as such did not exist. The immediate needs of the soldiers were supplied by the Commissariat Department, responsible to the Treasury. Commissaries were assigned to units as needed, but they acted to solve supply problems ad hoc. They had no idea beforehand what the army needed, or what it had, or where it was located.

All the needs were given to contractors, who usually required money in advance. They were allowed to borrow from recommended banks. The Commissariat then paid the banks, but should it fail to do so, the debts were still incumbent on the debtors. Contractors were allowed to charge a percentage for their services, and also to include a percentage given to their suppliers as enticement. The Commissariat could thus build entire impromptu supply departments on the basis of immediate need, which is what Frederick did for them.

The logistics problems were of the same type customarily undertaken by the consular staff, but of larger scale. Frederick was able to perform critical services for the army. Within several days he had all the men billeted ashore and had developed an organization of local suppliers on short notice. He secured their immediate attention by offering higher interest rates, to which the Commissary did not then object. He was so successful that he was given the problem of transporting men and supplies to the front. (Note: The current in the Dardanelles was about 4 knots, requiring a wait by sailing ships for the winds to overcome it. The Land Transport Department of the Commissary therefore undertook to develop overland trails and use horses and mules as pack animals. There were no roads or railroads. Frederick also was able to procure a few steamers to use as tugs for supply ships.) For that he developed his own transport division of contractors paid as direct employees of his own company. He also advised the Medical Department in their choice of a site near Erenköy for a military hospital, named Renkioi Hospital.

The army, arriving at Gallipoli in April 1854, did well at first, thanks to the efforts of Frederick Calvert and his peers. They were contracted by Deputy Assistant Commander-General of the Commissariat, John William Smith, on the instruction of the Commander-General, William Filder, who had given Smith their names in advance, especially that of Frederick Calvert. Frederick was waiting for the fleet in Gallipoli. (Note: The Commissary at this time was entirely civilian, accountable only to the Treasury. Its ranks were named the same as military ranks to give them credibility to the military, but there the resemblance ends. The date March is sometimes given, but this is the date the commissaries arrived. The name: there were so many "Smiths" among the dignitaries that the sources confuse which was which. A common error identifies "General Smith" with Deputy Assistant Comissary-General Charles Bagot-Smith. Lord Trevelyan, however, explicitly identifies John William as the commissary who contacted and handled Calvert and the other contractors: House of Commons 1855, pp. 15–17) By June the army was doing badly. The Commissary seemed to have no understanding of military schedules. Needed supplies were not getting to their destinations for a number of reasons: perishables were spoiled through delay, cargos were lost or abandoned because there was no tracking system, or cut because a commissary speculated that they should be, etc. Frederick attempted to carry on by using his own resources in the expectation of collecting the money later by due process. By the end of the war his bill to the Commissary would be several thousand pounds. He had had to mortgage family properties in the Troad.

By June it was obvious to Parliament that the cabinet position of Secretary of State for War and the Colonies was beyond the ability of only one minister. He was divested of his colonial duties, leaving him as Secretary of State for War, but the Commissary was still not in his domain. In August, Frederick purchased the winter feed for the animals and left it on the dock at Salonica. Filder had adopted a policy of purchasing hay from London and having it pressed for land transport, even though chopped hay was readily available at a much cheaper price around the Dardanelles. The Commissariat was supposed to inspect and accept it at Salonica, but the presses had been set up in the wrong location. By the time they were ready for the hay, most of it had spoiled, so they did not accept any of it.

The winter was especially severe. The animals starved, and without transport, so did the men, trying to make do without food, clothing, shelter or medical supplies. Estimates of the death rate were as high as 35%, 42% in the field hospitals. Florence Nightingale on the scene sounded the alarm to the general public. A scandal ensued; Prince Albert wrote to the Prime Minister. The folly of an army dying because not allowed to help itself while its Commissariat was not efficient enough to move even the minimum of supplies became manifest to the whole nation. In December Parliament placed the Commissariat under the army and opened an investigation. In January, 1855, the government resigned, to be replaced shortly by another determined to do whatever was necessary to obtain a functional supply corps.

The army found that it could not after all dispense with the Treasury or its system of payment. The first investigation went before Parliament in April, 1855. Filder's defense was that he had conformed strictly to regulations, (Note: Some analysts have characterized this obedience to regulation against all reason as a social disorder; for example, Funnell, W. N. (1988). "Pathological Responses to Accounting Controls:The British Commissariat in the Crimea 1854-1856". Australia: University of Wollongong.) and that he was not responsible for accidental events, which were "the visitations of God." John William Smith, Frederick's handler in the Commissariat, included a number of favorable statements about him in the report, such as "the Commissariat would have been perfectly helpless without Mr. Calvert." Parliament exonerated the Commissariat, finding "no one in the Crimea was to blame."

Anticipating this result, the new government started a secret investigation of its own under J. McNeill, a civilian physician, and a military officer, Colonel A.M. Tulloch, which it outed in April after the acquittal. The new investigation lasted until January, 1856, and had nothing favorable to say. Losses higher than any battle could produce, and higher than those of any of the allies, were not to be dismissed as accidental.

The new commissioners attacked the system: "the system hitherto relied on as sufficient to provide for every emergency, had totally failed." The blow fell mainly on Filder. He had plenty of alternatives, Tulloch asserted, which he might have been expected to take. Chopped hay and cattle were readily and cheaply available in the Constantinople region. Filder had some cattle transports at his command in October. Once the supplies had been transported to the Crimea, they could have been carried inland by the troops themselves. Of Filder, Tulloch said: "He was highly paid—not to do merely what he was ordered, but in the expectation that, when difficulties arose, he would show himself equal to the emergency, by ... exercising that discretion and intelligence which the public has a right to expect ...."

Filder was retired by the medical board because of age and sent home. Meanwhile, the Commissary had introduced the word "profiteering" in an effort to cast the blame from itself. The decisions had been made by greedy contractors charging high interest rates, who had introduced delays to push the price up. John William Smith recanted what he had said about Frederick, now claiming that Frederick had put private interests before the public, without clarifying what he meant. The insinuation was enough to brand him as a profiteer. The entire Commissariat took it up as a theme, the banks refusing to honor contractor claims. Restrictions on loans tightened; cash flow problems developed. The inflated economy of the Troad began to collapse. The report was released in January. By then most contractors were in bankruptcy. British troops went home at the end of the war in February, relationships with the Turkish merchants deteriorating to the point where conducting business with them was no longer viable.

The cost of living remained high. Frederick was no longer trusted as a consular agent and had trouble finding work. His friend, John Brunton, head of the military hospital near Erenköy, was ordered to dismantle and sell the facility. He suggested that Brunton sell the medical supplies to him as surplus at a discount, so that he could recoup some of his estate by reselling them. Turning on him, as Smith had done, Brunton denounced him publicly.

Criminal charges were brought against Frederick for non-payment of debt to the War Office by the Supreme Consular Court of Istanbul in March, 1857. Due to difficulty in proving their case, it went on for months, being finally transferred to London, where Frederick joined it in February, 1858. In 1859 he served a prison term of ten weeks on one debt. Subsequently, the Foreign Office stepped in to manage his appeal. The military had not understood how the interest system worked. He won his case before Parliament, with commendation and thanks, and payment of the several thousand plus backpay and interest, arriving home 2.5 years after he had left it, to rescue the estate. (Note: Having demonstrated loyalty to the army, Smith was now head of the Commissary, but not for long. in 1858 a royal warrant had provided for the replacement of civilian agents with military officers, leading ultimately to the formation of the current Royal Logistic Corps.)

==== The "Possidhon affair" and its aftermath ====
During the 1860s Frederick Calvert's life and career were mainly consumed by a case of insurance fraud termed by the press the "Possidhon affair." An attempt was made to defraud Lloyd's of London of payments to an imaginary person claiming to own an imaginary ship, the Possidhon, that had gone to the bottom when its imaginary cargo burned, a claim made through Frederick. The perpetrators of the fraud, originally the witnesses of the fire, named Frederick as their ringleader. The trial was not a proper one, and Frederick was convicted on technicalities. He protested that he was the victim of an Ottoman frame-up, and was supported in that plea by his brother, Frank. There were a number of circumstances that remain historically unexplained. Modern historians who think he was guilty characterize him as a charismatic profiteer of shady ethics, while those who think he was innocent point to his patriotic motives in helping the British Army to the detriment of his own estate and his acquittal by Parliament.

Having returned from London in October, 1860, with enough money to restore the family estate, Frederick now turned his attention to the family avocation, archaeology, rejecting a lucrative job offer as a Consul in Syria. Frank, now age 32, had long been the master of the estate and of the business. By this time he was also a skilled and respected archaeologist. He spent all of his spare time investigating and excavating the numerous habitation and burial sites of the Troad. He was an invaluable consultant to specialists in many areas from plants to coins. Frederick joined him in this life by choice. For a few years he was able to work with Frank in expanding Lander's library and collection, and in exploring and excavating ancient sites.

In 1846 Frederick married Eveline, an heiress of the wealthy Abbotts, owners of some mines in Turkey. They had at least five known children.

Frederick's wife's uncle, William Abbott, had gone with him to London, where they purchased a house for mutual residence. Frederick set him up in a few different businesses, the last being Abbott Brothers, dealers in firewood. His son, however, William George Abbott, a junior partner of Frederick in the consular business, remained in the Dardanelles to handle business there as acting consul. (Note: Both William and his son were termed incorrectly Frederick’s son-in-law and brother-in-law subsequently by the British Press.) In January, 1861, the consular office was approached by a Turkish merchant, Hussein Aga, requesting £12000 . ($57,250) of insurance from Lloyd's on the cargo of the Possidhon, which was olive oil. He claimed to be a broker marketing the oil produced by certain pashas and now wished to sell it in Britain.

Frederick requested William in London to borrow money as Abbot Brothers to finance the premiums. The debt was to be paid when the cargo was sold. It isn't clear whether Abbott was to sell it, and if so, in whose name. The cargo, being insured by him, was consigned to him. A loan of £1500 ($7,150) was effected on April 11, and the premiums were paid.

The ship, cleared to sail from Edremit to Britain by Frederick's office on April 4, sailed on the 6th. Frederick was to have inspected it before issuing the clearance, but he did not. On April 28 Frederick notified Lloyd's by telegram that the vessel had been seen burning off Lemnos in a heavy wind on April 8, which is peculiar, because it ought to have been far from Lemnos by then. When it had not arrived months later the creditors for the premiums requested their money. Frederick submitted a claim through Abbott for a total loss. He suggested Greek pirates and collaboration of the crew as causes, implicating Hussein Aga, who had not been seen since then. Lloyd's requested documents giving testimony of the loss, turning the case over to Lloyd's Salvage Association.

Frederick forwarded to Abbott in London four affidavits from British consular agents on Tenedos and Samos of visual sightings of the ship. Conspicuously absent were any Turkish documents that should have been examined before permission to sail was granted. An investigator from Lloyd's Salvage working from Constantinople finding no record of either Aga or the ship concluded to a fraud. Simultaneously Frederick, conducting his own investigation, reached a similar conclusion. He had been duped by a person pretending to be a fictional Hussein Aga. The witnesses produced a confession, naming Frederick as mastermind of the scheme. The Salvage Association turned the matter over to the Foreign Office. M. Tolmides, consular agent at Tenedos, admitted to signing the affidavits. His defense was that he had given Frederick blank signed forms.

The Foreign Office issued a public statement questioning Frederick's credibility. He requested permission to leave his post to travel to London to defend himself. Permission was denied. On April 30 he issued a statement that he had been set up and was being framed by an unknown agent, for whom he was conducting an unsuccessful search at Smyrna. He found some support in the British ambassador, Henry Bulwer, 1st Baron Dalling and Bulwer, a liberal and a freemason, who accepted him as credible, and noted the hostility of Turkish officialdom against him. However, unless Frederick could produce some evidence of the conspiracy, he affirmed, he would officially have to side with the insurance company. The matter became international. Turkish harbor officials claimed, via Lloyd's agents, that Frederick had submitted forged documents to them. The Ottoman Porte complained. The Prince of Wales scheduled a visit. Frederick was going to be brought before a consular court, an agency with a reputation for corruption; in particular, bribability.

== Reference bibliography ==
- Allen, Susan Heuck (July 1995). "Finding the Walls of Troy': Frank Calvert, Excavator". American Journal of Archaeology. 99 (3): 379–407. doi:10.2307/506941. JSTOR 506941.
- Allen, Susan Heuck (1999). Finding the Walls of Troy: Frank Calvert and Heinrich Schliemann at Hisarlik. Berkeley: University of California Press. ISBN 978-0-520-20868-1.
- Harpin, Paul H. (1976). The British War Office: from the Crimean War to Cardwell, 1855-1868 (MA). University of Massachusetts.
- House of Commons (1855). Reports from Committees. Vol. 9, Part 2. London: Great Britain. Parliament.
- Levantine Heritage Foundation (February 2013). "Collaborative Online Research Project: Consuls Of "The Dardanelles" And "Gallipoli"" (PDF).
- Robinson, Marcelle (1994). "Pioneer, Scholar, and Victim: An Appreciation of Frank Calvert (1828-1908)". Anatolian Studies. 44: 153–168. doi:10.2307/3642989. JSTOR 3642989.
- Tulloch, Alexander (1857). The Crimean Commission and the Chelsea Board. London: Harrison.

== Additional reading ==
- Susan Heuck Allen, Finding the Walls of Troy: Frank Calvert and Heinrich Schliemann at Hisarlik, University of California Press, 1999
