= Jean Adam =

Scottish poet

Jean Adam (or Adams) (30 April 1704 – 3 April 1765) was a Scottish poet from the labouring classes; her best-known work is "There's Nae Luck Aboot The Hoose". In 1734 she published a volume of her poetry entitled Miscellany poems, but the cost of shipping a substantial number to the British colony of Boston in North America, where they did not sell well, forced her to turn first to teaching and then to domestic labour. She died penniless in Glasgow's Town's Hospital poorhouse at the age of sixty.

== Early years ==
Born in Greenock into a maritime family, Adam was orphaned at a young age. Her most famous work (though the authorship was for some time in dispute) is "There's Nae Luck Aboot The Hoose", a tale of a sailor's wife and the safe return of her husband from the sea. It is reported that Robert Burns remarked on its quality in 1771, some years after Adam's death.

Adam had a limited education in reading, writing, and sewing. She first encountered poetry when she read extracts from Sir Philip Sidney's romance The Countess of Pembroke's Arcadia (1590) while working in domestic service with the minister of West Kirk, Greenock. There she also became acquainted with John Milton's work and translations of the classics.

== Writing career ==
Inspired by her reading, she started writing poetry herself and was aided by one Mr Drummond, a collector of customs and excise, in raising subscriptions for the publication of her volume of Miscellany poems, which was printed by James Duncan in 1734. There were some 150 subscribers, including customs officers, merchants, clergymen, local artisans, and the magnate Thomas Craufurd, the Laird of Cartsburn, to whom the book was dedicated. It was prefaced with a sketch of her status and background and consisted of 80 poems, virtually all on religious and moral themes. But sales were disappointing, and Adam's financial situation worsened after she used her savings to ship a substantial number of copies to British colonial Boston in North America, where they also did not sell well.

Adam went on to work for many years at a day school in Cartsdyke, her place of birth. After 1751 she turned to domestic labour for the rest of her life. Unable to recapture her fleeting success, Adams died penniless in Town's Hospital, a poorhouse in Glasgow, on 3 April 1765, after it was reported that she had been wandering about in the streets.

== Works ==
- Miscellany poems. By Mrs Jane Adams in Crawfordsdyke (Glasgow, 1734)
- "There's Nae Luck Aboot The Hoose" (song; attrib.)

== See also ==
- List of early-modern British women poets
