= Scottish poorhouse =

Scottish facility to support and provide housing for the needy

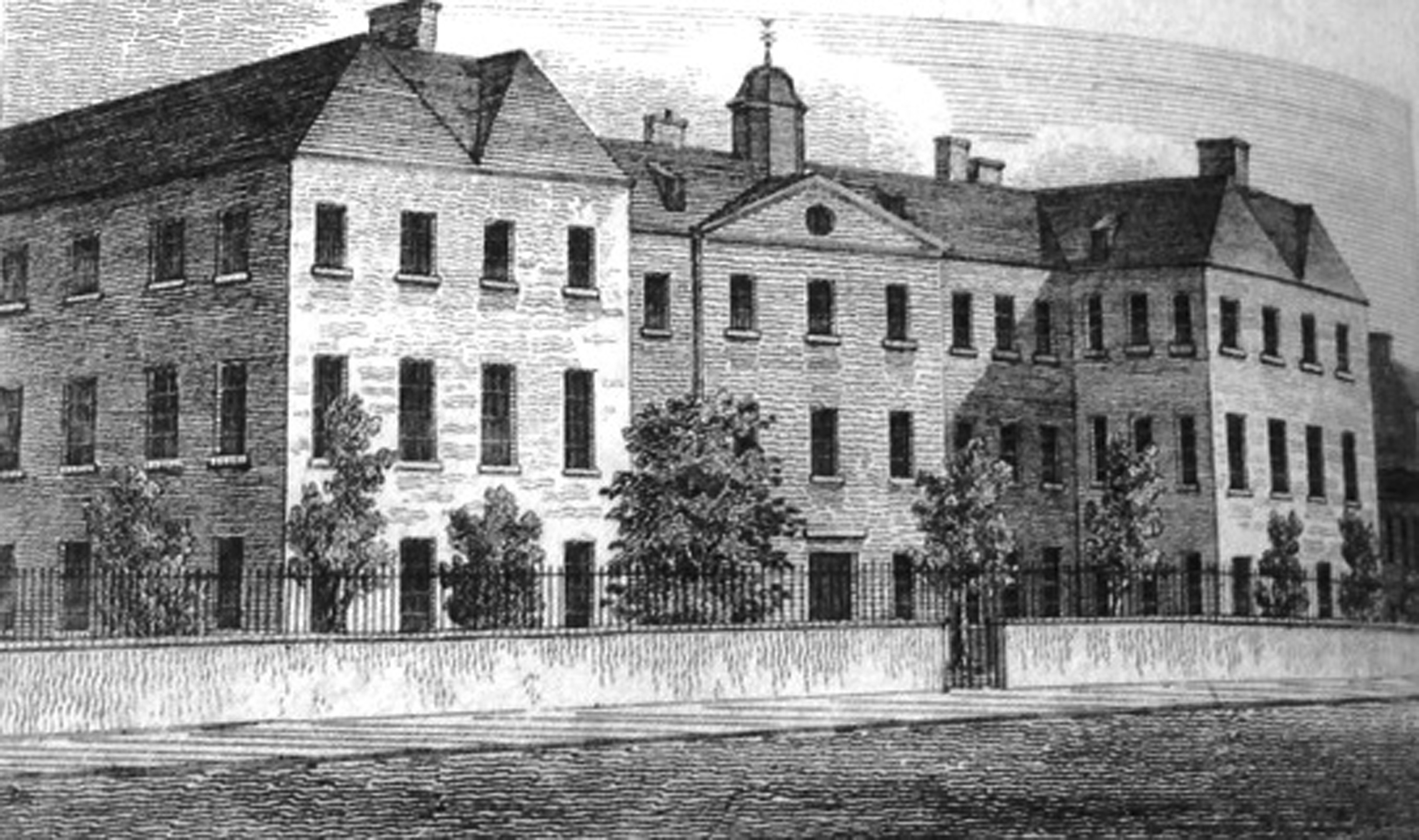
An engraving of the Glasgow poorhouse, Town's Hospital, from the 1830s

The Scottish poorhouse, occasionally referred to as a workhouse, provided accommodation for the destitute and poor in Scotland. The term poorhouse was almost invariably used to describe the institutions in that country, as unlike the regime in their workhouse counterparts in neighbouring England and Wales, residents were not usually required to labour in return for their upkeep.

Systems to deal with paupers were initiated by the Parliament of Scotland in the 15th century when a 1424 statute categorised vagrants into those deemed fit for work or those who were not able-bodied; several other ineffective statutes followed until the Scottish Poor Law Act of 1579 was put in place. The Act prevented paupers who were fit to work from receiving assistance and was reasonably successful. Any help provided generally took the form of outdoor relief, and although thirty-two main burghs were instructed to provide correction houses under the threat of being fined, it is doubtful any were built. In the 18th century, cities like Aberdeen, Edinburgh and Glasgow had poorhouses or similar which were funded by wealthy merchants or trade associations.

The system was adequate until the early 19th century in rural areas where poor relief was the remit of Ministers, church elders and landowners but did not suffice in the slum areas of towns. By the middle of the century though Scotland faced severe economic depression and this, coupled with the ecclesiastic upset of the Disruption of 1843, resulted in demand outstripping supply. Expansions to existing facilities in Edinburgh and Glasgow and design guidelines for constructing new poorhouses were drawn up by the Board of Supervision which advised the parochial boards set up after the enactment of the Poor Law (Scotland) Act 1845.

The facilities housed up to 400 occupants in cities and a slightly scaled down version was able to accommodate up to 300 paupers in rural areas. By 1868 there were fifty poorhouses in Scotland; strict regulations applied to admissions and were overseen by a local Inspector of the Poor. The number of inmates peaked in 1906 and after the introduction of the National Assistance Act 1948 (11 & 12 Geo. 6. c. 29), the Poor Law system was abolished throughout the United Kingdom.

== Legal and social background ==
=== Medieval to Early Modern period ===
Poor relief had been available since medieval times with procedures attempting to deal with paupers dating back to the 15th century. The first steps taken by the Scottish Parliament regarding arrangements for poor relief were enacted in a 1424 statute segregating vagrants into two categories: those fit enough to be able to work or those who were not considered able-bodied. Legislation in Scotland concerning poor relief differed in a number of respects to that enacted in England and Wales. Parishes in England were required to supply work to be undertaken by paupers capable of employment whereas in Scotland this was not a stipulation. Vagrants refused poor relief in Scotland were entitled to appeal, unlike those in England and Wales. A Scottish statute dating back to 1425 allowed sheriffs to apprehend beggars fit enough to work; if they did not find employment within forty days after their release they could be imprisoned. Ineffective statutes continued to be constituted: in 1427 magistrates failing to enforce previous legislation could be fined; beggars could be expelled from the area or jailed from 1449; and in further legislation passed during 1455 and 1477 beggars could be classified as thieves and executed.

The Scottish Poor Law Act of 1579 was implemented by Justices of the peace in rural districts and burgh magistrates in urban areas. Poor and destitute people who were fit enough to work were legally barred from receiving any assistance so the monies raised by collections at churches were usually enough to cover the needs of the poor without having to utilise the provision of the compulsory rate that was allowed for in the Act. The type of assistance given was generally outdoor relief, providing clothing, food, goods or money. A later Act in 1672 transferred responsibility in rural areas to Ministers, church elders and landowners; by 1752 greater influence was given to landowners, as the main ratepayers, to undertake decisions. Until the early 19th century, the arrangements worked quite well in rural districts; but, as slum areas increased in towns of a more industrial nature, the system began to fall short.

The Act passed in 1672 required the thirty-two main burghs to build correction houses, in which vagabonds were to be detained and forced to work. The Commissioners of Excise were empowered to issue fines of five hundred merks every three months against any burghs not completing the construction of correction houses within required time scales. But the threat of fines failed to encourage the building of these establishments, and doubt has been recorded by Poor Law Commissioners such as Sir George Nicholls as to whether any at all were built. Alexander Dunlop, politician and lawyer, shared the opinion that no purpose-built correction houses were ever constructed. (Note: Discussing the 1672 Act, historian Rosalind Mitchison observed that it demonstrated "the continuation of the sixteenth-century [Scottish] practice of passing Acts which were totally ignored".) Outdoor relief remained the main type of assistance, but poorhouses or their equivalent were sometimes funded by local merchants. In Aberdeen during the 1630s an institution had been established by wealthy cloth merchants; Canongate Charity Workhouse in Edinburgh was managed by several trade associations after being opened in 1761; and Glasgow had the Town's Hospital, opened in 1731.

Towards the end of the 18th century and the beginning of the 19th century, the system of poor relief in Scotland was considered to be superior to that of its counterpart in England by political economists like James Anderson. Writing in The Bee, a weekly publication mainly compiled by Anderson, in 1792 he reviewed the early volumes of the first Statistical Accounts of Scotland in which most parishes gave information on the poor; Anderson described the statutory system in England as "groaning under the influence of a system of laws" whereas he considered the poor in Scotland were "abundantly supplied with all that their wants require". Just over twenty-five years later, in 1818, the General Assembly of the Church of Scotland also praised the methods adopted when giving its opinion in the Select Committee's Report on the English Poor Laws. Representatives of the English Commissioners spent time in Scotland prior to making recommendations which resulted in the 1834 Poor Law Amendment Act and had declared the laws in Scotland and the way it was administered as "admirable". Inadequacies in the Scottish arrangements began to garner more attention within a few years; in 1840 William Alison, a social reformer, published his thoughts on the administration of poor relief and its effects on disease. Around that time Scotland was spending about one shilling and three pence per head of population on poor relief; in France the figure was ten shillings, which was similar to the English costs in around 1832.

=== Poor Law Act 1845 ===
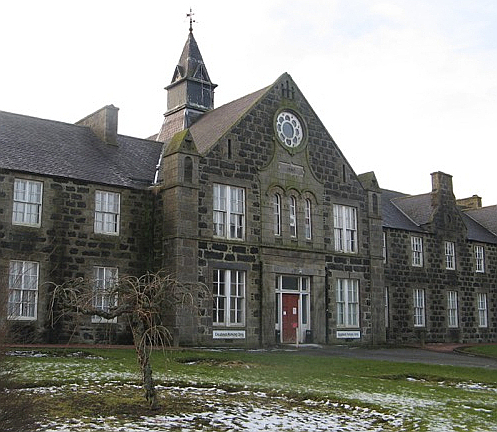
Buchan Combination poorhouse was constructed in 1867. It was taken over by the National Health Service in 1948 and operated as Maud Hospital until about 2008, providing care for the elderly.

The 1707 Act of Union between Scotland and England had allowed Scotland to retain its existing legal system, so consequently the reforms to the Poor Law enacted in England and Wales in 1834 did not apply to Scotland. Nevertheless, the Scottish system of poor relief suffered from the same strains of demand exceeding supply as did the English. An additional factor in Scotland was the Disruption of 1843, which resulted in 40 per cent of the clergy of the Church of Scotland leaving to form the rival Free Church of Scotland. The ecclesiastical upset followed a severe economic depression in Scotland between 1839 and 1842 and, as the poor relief system in the country was heavily dependent on the clergy, a Royal Commission was set up to address the impact this series of events had on the poor. The commission collated information received from almost every parish and its recommendations were published in 1844 forming the basis of the 1845 Poor Law Act.

Following the passage into law of the 1845 Poor Law Act, parochial boards were established and given the power to allocate and raise local funding. The parochial boards came under the jurisdiction of a Board of Supervision based in Edinburgh. Sir John McNeill was Chairman of the committee made up of the Lord Provosts from Edinburgh and Glasgow, together with sheriffs representing Perth, Renfrew and Ross and Cromarty. The Solicitor General and three crown appointees were also included. The central board acted in an advisory capacity to the 880 parishes but its approval was required for any alterations to established poorhouses and plans for any new ones also had to be approved. The new law allowed parishes to combine to operate poorhouses jointly, the so-called combination poorhouses. About three-quarters of Scotland's seventy or so poorhouses were run as combinations, although the majority of paupers continued to be in receipt of outdoor relief. By the 1890s there was accommodation for more than 15,000 paupers in Scottish poorhouses, but the average occupancy rate barely exceeded half of that.

== Early Victorian poorhouses ==
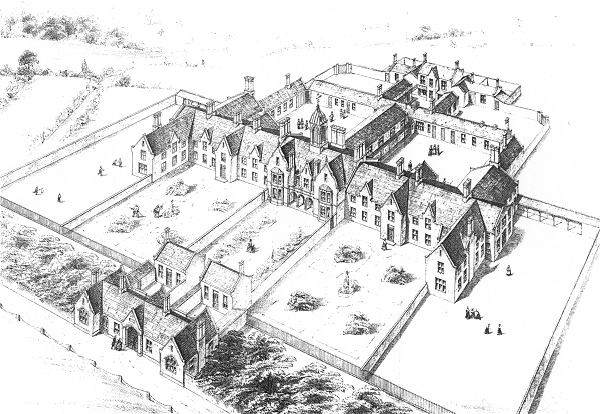
Plan for Aberdeen Poorhouse drawn up by the architects Mackenzie & Matthews in 1847

The reforms incorporated into the 1845 Poor Law in Scotland were not as extreme as those in the earlier English legislation of 1834 and changes were only slowly enacted. Three years after the inception of the Board of Supervision its annual report indicated the approval of proposals to expand the existing Edinburgh poorhouse and Town's Hospital, the Glasgow workhouse that was established in 1731. A design guideline for the building of new poorhouses was drawn up in 1847 and the construction of eight new poorhouses was endorsed in 1848. The architectural firm of Mackenzie & Matthews had drawn up plans for a proposed poorhouse to serve the joint parishes of St Nicholas and Old Machar in Aberdeen, the city in which their practice was primarily based, and with only slight modifications formed the basis of the ideal. It is likely the design was inspired by the work of Scott and Moffatt, who played a role in the design of later English workhouses, rather than those of Sampson Kempthorne. The designs for facilities in cities were able to house up to 400 occupants with a smaller scale version for up to 300 inmates for rural poorhouses.

Decisions concerning poor relief remained predominantly with individual parishes at local levels, and Inspectors of the Poor were appointed locally to assess requests for relief. In contrast to the regulations in England and Wales the establishment of poorhouses was optional, and outdoor relief could still be provided, which remained the preferred choice of most parishes. The model poorhouse design reflected this difference as rooms near the entrance were allocated for the distribution of clothing and food to those in need of outdoor relief. Neither did Scottish poorhouses rely on the earnings of inmates to contribute towards their expenditure, as was the case in England. The number of poorhouses constructed increased significantly during the period from 1850 when there were twenty-one poorhouses; this number had swelled to fifty by 1868. The majority of these were in or around Glasgow and Edinburgh. The Board required consistency in the management and operation of poorhouses, and provided a framework to be adhered to.

=== Admission and discharge ===
Strict regulations were enforced before paupers were admitted to the poorhouse, and written permission had to be produced to the gatekeeper. Generally signed by the local Inspector of the Poor, the authorisation had to be dated no more than three days earlier unless the holder stayed more than five miles from the poorhouse, in which case the limit was extended to six days. All new admissions were segregated into a probationary area until they had been examined and declared free from diseases affecting the mind and body by a medical officer. They would be thoroughly searched and their clothing removed before they were bathed and supplied with a standard-issue uniform. Their own clothing was steam cleaned and held in storage until they left. If a pauper wished to leave they could do so by giving the House Governor twenty-four hours notice; the simplicity of this led to the discharge system often being exploited but official authorisation was again required before re-admittance was permitted.

Officially there were five groupings applied to inmates: children less than two years of age; girls under fifteen years old; boys under fifteen years old; male adults over fifteen years old; and female adults over fifteen years old. Most children, around 80–90 per cent, who may have required long-term care were more often fostered, or boarded out as it was known at the time. The rooms to the right of the entrance block provided the facilities for the paupers to be searched, bathed and held in a sequential course through the building, an arrangement that when compared to the buildings in England was "more sophisticated and functionally appropriate".

== Later developments and abolition ==
The Board of Supervision continued to have overall responsibility for the administration of the Poor Law in Scotland until it was replaced by the Local Government Board under the terms of the Local Government (Scotland) Act 1894. In 1919 the newly formed Scottish Board of Health assumed responsibility for administering poor relief, mirroring a similar move in England and Wales that same year, where the Ministry of Health took over.

The number of those accommodated in poorhouses reached its peak in 1906, but represented less than 14 per cent of those in receipt of poor relief, compared with 37 per cent in England. Nevertheless, by 1938 more was being spent on administering the Poor Law in real terms than had been spent in 1890. The inter-war depression was felt much more keenly by the working-class in Scotland than in England, and the bitterness it engendered led directly to the introduction of the National Assistance Act 1948 (11 & 12 Geo. 6. c. 29), which finally abolished the last vestiges of the Poor Law system across the entire United Kingdom.

== See also ==
- Old Scottish Poor Law
- Scottish poor laws
