= Seven Ill Years =

1690s famine in Scotland

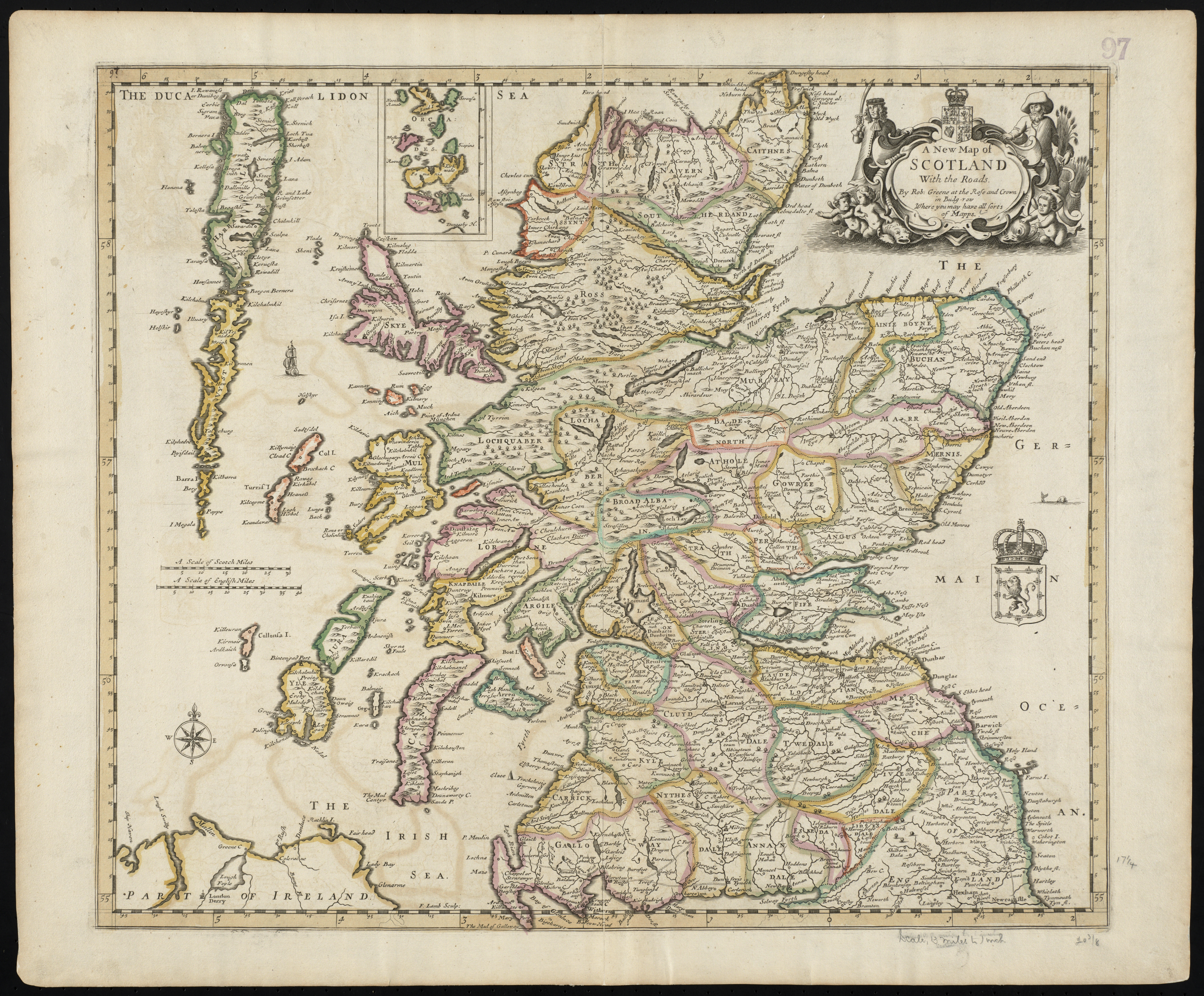
1689 map of Scotland

The Seven Ill Years, also known as the Seven Lean Years (Scottish Gaelic: seachd bliadhna gorta), is the term used for a period of widespread and prolonged famine in Scotland during the 1690s, named after the biblical famine in Egypt predicted by Joseph in the Book of Genesis. Estimates suggest between 5 and 15% of the total Scottish population died of starvation, while in areas like Aberdeenshire death rates may have reached 25%. One reason the shortages of the 1690s are so well remembered is because they were the last of their kind.

As documented in tree ring records, the 1690s was the coldest decade in Scotland for the past 750 years. Failed harvests in 1695, 1696, 1698 and 1699, combined with an economic slump caused by the Nine Years' War, resulted in severe famine and depopulation.

The Old Scottish Poor Law was overwhelmed by the scale of the crisis, although provision in the urban centres of the burghs was probably better than in the countryside. It led to migration between parishes and emigration to England, Europe, the Americas and particularly Ireland. The crisis resulted in the setting up of the Bank of Scotland and the Company of Scotland, whose failure following the Darien scheme increased the pressure for political union with England, finalised in the 1707 Union with England Act.

== Causes ==
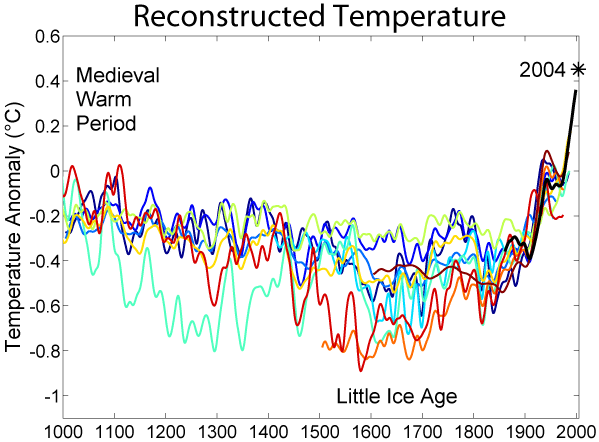
Temperature comparisons showing the Little Ice Age

Before the mid-17th century, difficult terrain, poor roads and primitive methods of transport meant there was little trade between different areas of Scotland. This became less true after 1660, with the number of rural towns authorised to hold markets increasing from 100 to over 300 by 1707, but surpluses were exported, the most significant being the lucrative cattle trade with England. For various reasons, Scottish agriculture was not as productive as it should have been, a situation which persisted into the first decades of the 18th century.

Most settlements depended for subsistence on what was produced locally, often with very little in reserve in bad years. Most farming was based on the lowland fermtoun or highland baile, settlements of a handful of families that jointly farmed an area notionally suitable for two or three plough teams. These were allocated in run rigs, of "runs" (furrows) and "rigs" (ridges), to tenant farmers. Those with property rights included husbandmen, lesser landholders and free tenants, while below them were the cottars, who often shared rights to common pasture, occupied small portions of land and participated in joint farming as hired labour. Farms also might have grassmen, who had rights only to grazing. There were also large numbers of casual wage labourers who carried out basic agricultural work. Labourers on fixed incomes, along with pensioners, were particularly vulnerable to the impact of famine, but it also affected those with land, who could not save enough seed for future planting and feed their families. Even pastoral farmers were affected as the price of animal feed became unaffordable.

The closing decade of the seventeenth century brought an end to the generally favourable economic conditions that had dominated since the Restoration of the monarchy in 1660. After 1689, Scottish involvement in the Nine Years' War led to a slump in trade with key markets in the Baltic and France, followed by failed harvests in 1695, 1696, 1698 and 1699. Famine was generally widespread across Scotland from 1694 to 1699, although some regions were affected for shorter periods. However, these followed years of relatively poor harvests in the 1680s, while the impact did not entirely subside until after 1700.

Across Europe, the 1690s marked the low point of the Little Ice Age, a prolonged period of colder and wetter weather that began in 15th century. This lowered the altitude at which crops could be grown and in some years shortened the growing season by up to two months. The massive eruptions of volcanoes at Hekla in Iceland (1693) and Serua (1693) and Aboina (1694) in Indonesia may also have polluted the atmosphere and filtered out large amounts of sunlight.

== Impact ==
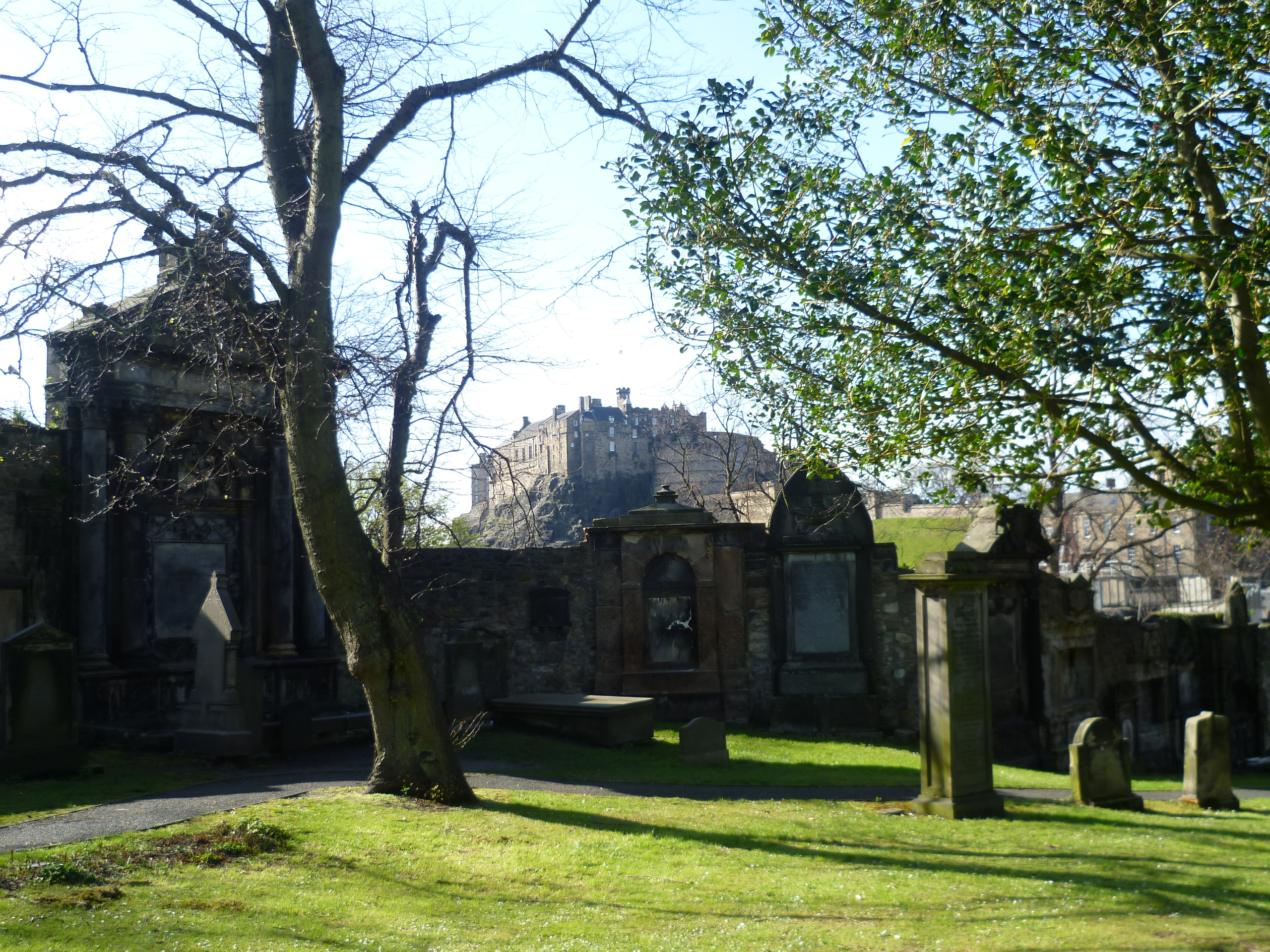
Greyfriars Kirkyard, Edinburgh, where the town council erected a "refugee camp" to deal with the influx of starving families in 1696

The results of the climatic conditions were inflation, severe famine and depopulation, particularly in the north of the country, with eye-witness accounts indicating large numbers of people having died from starvation. Local tacksmen claimed during the period from 1695 to 1697 "many people starved to death for want, both in town and country" and in 1698 reports reached Edinburgh of people found dead on the roads throughout the country. The same year, the price of oatmeal, the staple Scottish cereal crop, peaked at 166.7% of the average for 1690 to 1694 in Aberdeen, an area particularly badly hit because of its reliance on the Baltic trade. Individuals were reduced to eating grass, nettles and rotten meat in order to survive. Estimates of overall deaths from starvation range from 5 to 15%, but in areas like Aberdeenshire may have reached 25%. The young, the old and widows were particularly vulnerable.

The famines led to a rapid increase in the number of paupers and vagrants taking to the roads to find work, charity and food. In 1698, Andrew Fletcher of Saltoun (1655–1716) estimated that perhaps one-sixth of the population of Scotland, about 200,000 people, had left their homes to beg for food and charity, a doubling of the 100,000 vagrants that he estimated travelled the country during non-crisis years. Much of this movement was within large parishes, which allowed families to continue to receive the poor relief that was officially confined to local residents. However, many of these families later moved further afield to major urban centres and to other countries, particularly England and Ireland. So many poor beggars arrived in Edinburgh in search of relief in December 1696 that the town council had to erect a "refugee camp" in Greyfriars kirkyard to house all of them. Other towns reacted by enforcing severe punishments for beggars.

The system of the Old Scottish Poor Law was overwhelmed by the scale of the crisis. In the countryside, where the majority of the population lived, it relied on funds raised and distributed by the kirk session, usually led by the parish minister and reliant on the generosity of local landholders, particularly the local laird. The role of the minister was undermined by the results of the change of regime in the Glorious Revolution in Scotland, which meant that many episcopalian ministers had been ejected from their livings and had not been replaced by the time of the famines. In the urban settlements of the burghs there were more mechanisms that could be used to provide for the poor. In addition to the kirk sessions and general sessions of the church, there were guilds, trades' societies and town councils. Town councils also had the ability to intervene in local grain markets in an attempt to maintain low prices in times of scarcity. The impact of the famine may have been exacerbated in urban centres as the influx of new starving populations brought outbreaks of disease such as smallpox, which are evident from parish registers for the period.

== Significance ==
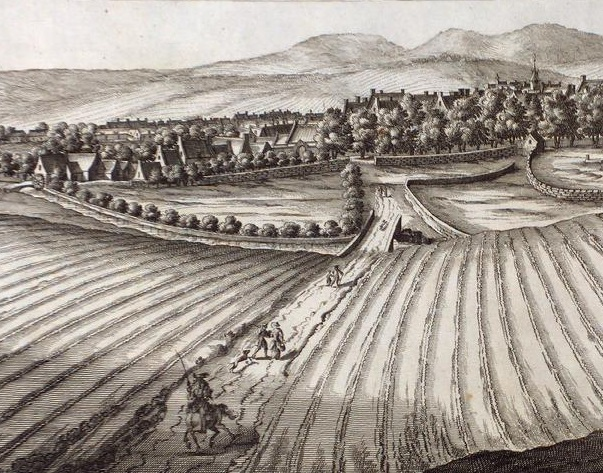
Runrig farming outside the town of Haddington, East Lothian c. 1690

These problems were not confined to Scotland; the years 1695–97 saw catastrophic famine in present-day Estonia, Finland, Latvia, Norway and Sweden plus an estimated two million deaths in France and Northern Italy. Its historical significance and impact is partly due to the fact famine had become relatively rare in the second half of the seventeenth century, with only 1674 being one of dearth and these were to be the last of their kind.

The conditions resulted in limited migration between estates and parishes in Scotland; emigration to England was limited by English Poor Laws preventing distribution of relief to strangers, while continental Europe had the same issues. It may have been a factor in emigration to the American colonies and the West Indies by volunteers as indentured servants, which became the most significant form of transatlantic emigration from Scotland in this period. From 1650 to 1700, approximately 7,000 Scots emigrated to America, 10–20,000 to Europe and England and 60–100,000 to Ireland. In a continuation of earlier Scottish settlement to the Ulster Plantation, an estimated 20,000 migrated there from 1696 to 1698, due to the availability of land confiscated following the end of the Williamite War in Ireland in 1691.

To tackle the desperate economic situation, in 1695 the Scottish Parliament passed Acts allowing the consolidation of run rigs and the division of common land which drove the agricultural improvements of the eighteenth century. These changes made Scottish farming highly productive and ensured people could be fed in extreme conditions, even with the population growing.

Other changes included the creation of the Bank of Scotland, while the Company of Scotland, established to trade with East Asia, received a charter to raise capital through public subscription. The Company invested in the Darién scheme, an ambitious plan funded almost entirely by Scottish investors to build a colony on the Isthmus of Panama for trade with East Asia. An estimated 15–40% of available capital in Scotland was invested in this project, which was abandoned in 1700; only 1,000 of 3,000 colonists survived and only one ship returned. The losses of £150,000 put a severe strain on the Scottish commercial system and were a key driver of the 1707 Acts of Union creating the Kingdom of Great Britain.

== See also ==
- Inclosure act

== Sources ==
- Bowie, K (2012). Devine, Tom; Wormald, John (eds.). New perspectives on pre-union Scotland in The Oxford Handbook of Modern Scottish History. OUP. ISBN 978-0-19-162433-9.
- Cullen, Karen (2010). Famine in Scotland: The "Ill Years" of the 1690s. Edinburgh University Press. ISBN 978-0-7486-3887-1.
- D'Arrigo, Rosanne; Klinger, Patrick; Newfield, Timothy (2020). "Complexity in crisis: The volcanic cold pulse of the 1690s and the consequences of Scotland's failure to cope". Journal of Volcanology and Geothermal Research. 389 106746. Bibcode:2020JVGR..38906746D. doi:10.1016/j.jvolgeores.2019.106746. hdl:10023/21075. ISSN 0377-0273.
- de Vries, Jan (2009). "The Economic Crisis of the 17th Century" (PDF). Journal of Interdisciplinary Studies. 40 (2): 151–194.
- Dingwall, HM (2001). Lynch, Michael (ed.). Health, famine and disease: 1500–1770, in "The Oxford Companion to Scottish History". Oxford University Press. ISBN 0-19-969305-6.
- Mitchison, Rosalind (2002). A History of Scotland (3rd ed.). Routledge. ISBN 0-415-27880-5.
- Mitchison, Rosalind (1983). Lordship to Patronage, Scotland 1603–1745. Edinburgh University Press. ISBN 0-7486-0233-X.
- Morrison, I (2011). Lynch, Michael (ed.). Climate The Oxford Companion to Scottish History. Oxford University Press. ISBN 978-0-19-969305-4.
- Richards, Eric (2004). Britannia's Children: Emigration from England, Scotland, Wales and Ireland since 1600. Continuum. ISBN 978-1-85285-441-6.
- * Smout, TC (2012). Devine, Tom; Wormald, Jenny (eds.). Land and sea: the environment in The Oxford Handbook of Modern Scottish History. OUP. ISBN 978-0-19-162433-9.
- Smout, T. C.; Landsman, N. C; Devine, Tom (1994). Canny, N (ed.). Scottish emigration in the seventeenth and eighteenth centuries in Europeans on the Move. Oxford University Press. ISBN 0-19-820419-1.
- Smout, T. C.; Fenton, Alexander (1965). "Scottish Agriculture before the Improvers—an Exploration". The Agricultural History Review. 13 (2): 73–93. JSTOR 40273166.
- White, I. D (2011). Lynch, Michael (ed.). Rural Settlement 1500–1770 in The Oxford Companion to Scottish History. Oxford University Press. ISBN 978-0-19-969305-4.
- Wormald, Jenny (1991). Court, Kirk, and Community: Scotland, 1470–1625. Edinburgh University Press. ISBN 0-7486-0276-3..
- Wormald, Jenny (2005). Scotland: A History. Oxford University Press. ISBN 0-19-162243-5..
