= Alexander Tulloch =

British Army general and statistician (1803–1864)

Major-General Sir Alexander Tulloch KCB FSS
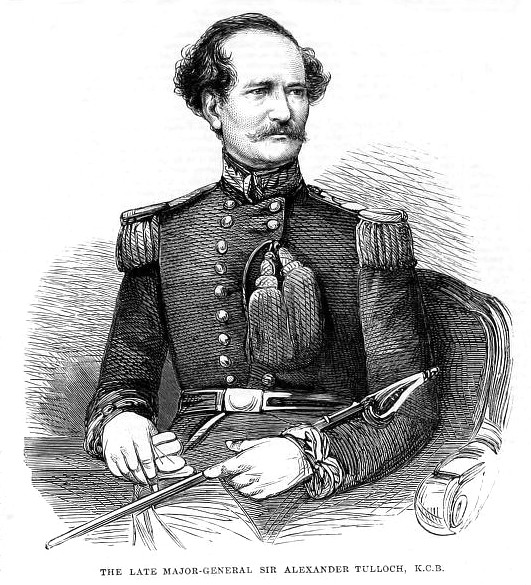
- Portrait from the Illustrated London News, 1864
- Born: 1803; Newry, Ireland
- Died: 16 May 1863 (aged 59–60); Winchester
- Military career
- Allegiance: United Kingdom
- Branch: British Army
- Rank: Major-General

Major-General Sir Alexander Murray Tulloch KCB FSS (1803 – 16 May 1864) was a British Army officer and a statistician.

He was a Fellow of the Statistical Society and worked with Surgeon-General Henry Marshall and Sir Graham Balfour on army statistics. In the 1850s he went with Sir John McNeill to the Crimea, and worked with Florence Nightingale.

== Early life ==
Murray was born at Newry, the eldest son of John Tulloch, a captain in the British army, and his wife, daughter of Thomas Gregorie of Perth, Scotland. He was educated for the law, but after a brief experience in a legal office in Edinburgh, he. Retrieved 9 April 1826 a commission as ensign in the 45th regiment, which had been serving in Burma in the recently ended First Anglo-Burmese War. He joined his corps in India, and on 30 November 1827 became lieutenant.

In India Tulloch became interested in the question of army reform. He called attention to the food provided for the rank and file, and his corps, then stationed in Burma, were provided with fresh meat, soft bread, and vegetables. He exposed the system used by Indian officials who paid soldier in silver depreciated in value, to the amount of nearly 20%. In addition, the canteen arrangements of the East India Company were such that a private soldier had to pay five times the value of his liquor.

Tulloch, while still a subaltern, wrote repeated letters in Indian journals, signed "Dugald Dalgetty", in which he exposed abuses. He left for Europe on sick leave in 1831. He took home specimens of depreciated coin, had them assayed at the Royal Mint, and got the matter taken up by the secretary at war, John Cam Hobhouse, Baron Broughton, who called on the company for an explanation. The matter was dropped for a time, but about 1836 it was revived by Tulloch, and Earl Grey, after investigation, compelled the company to make reparation by supplying the army yearly with coffee, tea, sugar, and rice, to the value of £70,000, the amount of the annual deficit.

On his return to England Tulloch entered the senior department of the Royal Military College Sandhurst, and obtained a first-class certificate. While at the college he gained the friendship of John Narrien the mathematical professor.

== Statistician ==
During his residence in India Tulloch had been impressed by the amount of sickness among the troops. With figures available to him, he drew up a series of tables showing the approximate death rate at various stations for a period of twenty years. These tables he published in Colburn's United Service Magazine for 1835. They attracted the attention of Earl Grey, then secretary of war, and he appointed Tulloch, with Henry Marshall and George Balfour, to investigate the subject fully and to report on it to parliament. Four volumes of statistical reports were the results of their inquiry, which extended till 1840, and the data afforded by the investigation have formed the basis of many subsequent ameliorations of the soldier's condition.

While engaged on the statistics relating to sickness, Tulloch's attention was drawn to the longevity of army pensioners, and after some research he found that great frauds were perpetrated on the government by the relatives of deceased pensioners continuing to draw their pay. By his recommendation these impositions were rendered impossible by the organisation of the pensioners into a corps with staff officers, and in this manner the pensioners were also rendered a body capable of affording assistance to the state on emergency. He obtained a captaincy on 12 March 1838 and was appointed a Companion of the Order of the Bath (CB) in the 1838 Coronation Honours. He was promoted to the rank of major on 29 March 1839, was appointed lieutenant-colonel on 31 May 1844, and on 20 June 1854 obtained the rank of colonel.

== Crimean War report ==
In 1855, in consequence of the disasters in the Crimean War, Tulloch was sent with Sir John McNeill to examine the system of commissariat. Their final report was prepared in January 1856, and laid before parliament. Its views reflected on the capacity of many officers of high rank who had served in the Crimea. The commissioners did not lay the entire blame on the failure of the home authorities to furnish adequate supplies, but, on the contrary, reprehended the carelessness of general officers with the army in not providing for the proper distribution of stores and in neglecting the welfare of their troops.

The report was resented by many military men, and, through their representations, was referred to a board of general officers assembled at Chelsea. McNeill declined to take any share in the proceedings. Tulloch, however, appeared before the board to sustain the report and to clear himself of charges of malignant feeling made by Lord Lucan. The board refused to endorse the findings of the report, and laid the whole blame of the Crimean disasters on the authorities at Whitehall. Tulloch had been prevented by illness from attending the final meetings, but in 1857 he published, in defence, The Crimean Commission and the Chelsea Board. Palmerston's government then were compelled by a parliamentary vote to bestow on him the honour of K.C.B., and to appoint McNeill a privy councillor. Kinglake, in his Invasion of the Crimea, repeated the allegations of the general officers, and accused the Crimean commissioners of having gone beyond their instructions, and of basing their report on improperly digested evidence. He drew from Tulloch a second edition of his work, published in 1882, on account of "certain misstatements in Mr. Kinglake's seventh volume", with a preface by Sir John McNeill, in which he denied Kinglake's insinuation that he did not fully support Tulloch in regard to the findings of their report.

== Family ==
On 17 April 1844, Tulloch married Emma Louisa, youngest daughter of Sir William Hyde Pearson, M.D.

== Last years ==
In 1859, in poor health, Tulloch retired from the war office with the rank of major-general. He died without issue at Winchester on 16 May 1864, and was buried at Welton, near Daventry. Louisa Tulloch is also buried at Welton, and there is a memorial to her at the church of St. Marten, Welton.
