= Scottish poor laws =

Scottish poverty relief laws

The Scottish poor laws were the statutes concerning poor relief passed in Scotland between 1579 and 1929. Scotland had a different poor law system to England and the workings of the Scottish laws differed greatly to the Poor Law Amendment Act 1834 which applied in England and Wales.

In 1579, the Scottish Parliament passed an act which made individual parishes responsible for enumerating their own poor. More than merely enumerate, the purpose of the law was an "inquisition" into the circumstances of the individual poverty, so as to determine whether the poor were able to work, whether they had any other means of subsistence, and whether there were other persons, family or others, who might assist them. The laws at that time codified the need to assist the poor—but at the same time as outlawing what were apparently considered public nuisances: begging and vagrancy. In 1595, Buttock Mail, a Scottish poor rate began to be levied. There was further legislation in 1597 which made the parishes rather than the church responsible for the administration of poor relief. In 1672, magistrates were ordered to build correction houses or workhouses so that beggars could be made to work. In most of Scotland no Poor Rate (local property tax for the relief of the poor) was levied under the old system.

In 1843, a commission of inquiry was set up to suggest improvements to the Scottish poor law system. Proposals suggested included:

- Setting up a board of supervision and parochial boards
- The levying of a poor rate
- Joint poorhouses in urban areas
- An Inspector of the Poor who could examine requests for relief.

== Scottish Poor Law Act ==
After the Act of Union, Scotland retained its distinct legal system and the Poor Law Amendment Act 1834 was not applied to Scotland. As in England, it was necessary to reform the poor laws. A commission of inquiry was established in 1843 to determine system reform. This resulted in the Poor Law (Scotland) Act 1845 being passed. This act established parochial boards in parishes and towns and a central Board of Supervision in Edinburgh.

In Scotland the able-bodied poor had no automatic right to poor relief as in England. The Poor Law (Scotland) Act 1845 created a central Board of Supervision which had the ability to raise local taxes to cover poor relief costs. Unlike in England, the Scottish pauper had a legal right to appeal if they were denied poor relief. Outdoor relief was common; however, mismanagement of the system meant that a more restricted system after 1868 which relied more on the poorhouse.

The Archives and Special Collections at the Mitchell Library in Glasgow hold more than 1,000,000 applications for poor relief made by residents of Glasgow and the west of Scotland. These records can prove extremely useful for the family historian, and contain detailed notes and information about the applicants, their families and life.

== See also ==
- Old Scottish Poor Law
- Education Act 1496
