= Poor Law (Scotland) Act 1845 =

Act of the Parliament of the United Kingdom

Poor Law (Scotland) Act 1845 (Note: The citation of this act by this short title was authorised by section 1 of, and the first schedule to, the Short Titles Act 1896. Due to the repeal of those provisions it is now authorised by section 19(2) of the Interpretation Act 1978.)
- Act of Parliament
- Parliament of the United Kingdom
- Long title: An Act for the Amendment and better Administration of the Laws relating to the Relief of the Poor in Scotland.
- Citation: 8 & 9 Vict. c. 83
- Territorial extent: United Kingdom

Dates
- Royal assent: 4 August 1845
- Commencement: 4 August 1845 (Note: The Acts of Parliament (Commencement) Act 1793.)
- Repealed: 5 July 1948 (Note: The National Assistance Act (Appointed Day) (Scotland) Order 1948 (SI 1948/1207).)
Other legislation
Amended by	Statute Law Revision Act 1875
Repealed by	National Assistance Act 1948

Status: Repealed

Text of statute as originally enacted

The Poor Law (Scotland) Act 1845 (8 & 9 Vict. c. 83) was an act of the Parliament of the United Kingdom that reformed the Poor Law system of Scotland.

== Provisions ==
- The creation of a Board of Supervision to regulate the Poor Law system.
- A retention of the parish-based system through parochial boards
- Powers for the parochial boards to raise taxes
- Poor relief could continue to be in the form of outdoor relief, poorhouses could be built to aid the sick
- Parishes should join together to build poorhouses
- An Inspector of the Poor decided whether applications for poor relief were legitimate

== Subsequent developments ==
The whole act was repealed by section 62(3) of, and part II of the seventh schedule to, the National Assistance Act 1948 (11 & 12 Geo. 6. c. 29), which came into force on 5 July 1948.

== See also ==
- Old Scottish Poor Law
