= Old Scottish Poor Law =

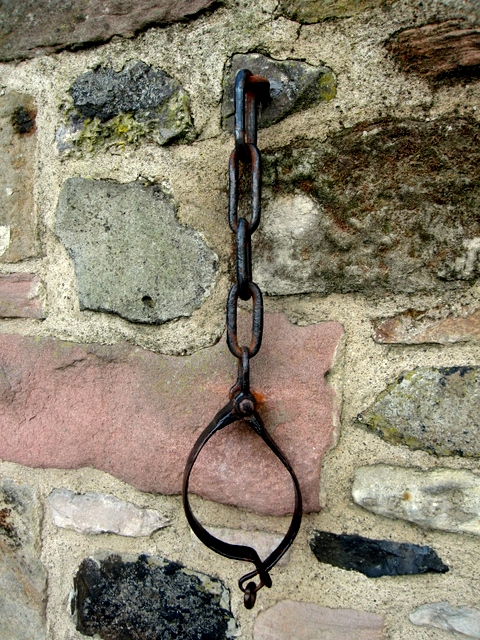
The jougs at Duddingston Parish Church, ordered to be established for beggars and other offenders from 1593

The Old Scottish Poor Law was the poor law system of Scotland between 1574 and 1845.

== Origins ==
Population growth and economic dislocation from the second half of the 16th century led to a growing problem of vagrancy. The government reacted with three major pieces of legislation: an act in 1575, the Beggars and Poor Act 1579 (c. 12 (S)) and the Beggars and Poor Act 1592 (c. 69 (S)). The kirk became a major element of the system of poor relief and justices of the peace were given responsibility for dealing with the issue. The 1575 act, enabled through a Convention of the Estates, was modelled on the English Vagabonds Act 1572 (14 Eliz. 1. c. 5), passed two years earlier, and limited relief to the deserving poor of the old, sick and infirm, imposing draconian punishments on a long list of "masterful beggars", including jugglers, palmisters and unlicensed tutors. Parish deacons, elders or other overseers were to draw up lists of deserving poor and each would be assessed. Those not belonging to the parish were to be sent back to their place of birth and might be put in the stocks or otherwise punished, probably actually increasing the level of vagrancy. Unlike the English act, there was no attempt to provide work for the able-bodied poor. In practice, the strictures on begging were often disregarded in times of extreme hardship. This legislation provided the basis of what would later be known as the "Old Poor Law" in Scotland, which remained in place until reforms in 1845. In most of Scotland a poor rate (local property tax for the relief of the poor) was not levied before the Poor Law (Scotland) Act 1845 (8 & 9 Vict. c. 83).

== Later development ==
Most subsequent legislation built on the principles of provision for the local deserving poor and punishment of mobile and undeserving "sturdie beggars". The most important later act was that of 1649, which declared that local heritors were to be assessed by kirk session to provide the financial resources for local relief, rather than relying on voluntary contributions. The system was largely able to cope with the general level of poverty and minor crises, helping the old and infirm to survive and provide life support in periods of downturn at relatively low cost, but was overwhelmed in the major subsistence crisis of the 1690s.

== See also ==
- Scottish poor laws
- Poor Law (Scotland) Act 1845
- Seven ill years
