= Town's Hospital =

Poorhouse in Glasgow, Scotland

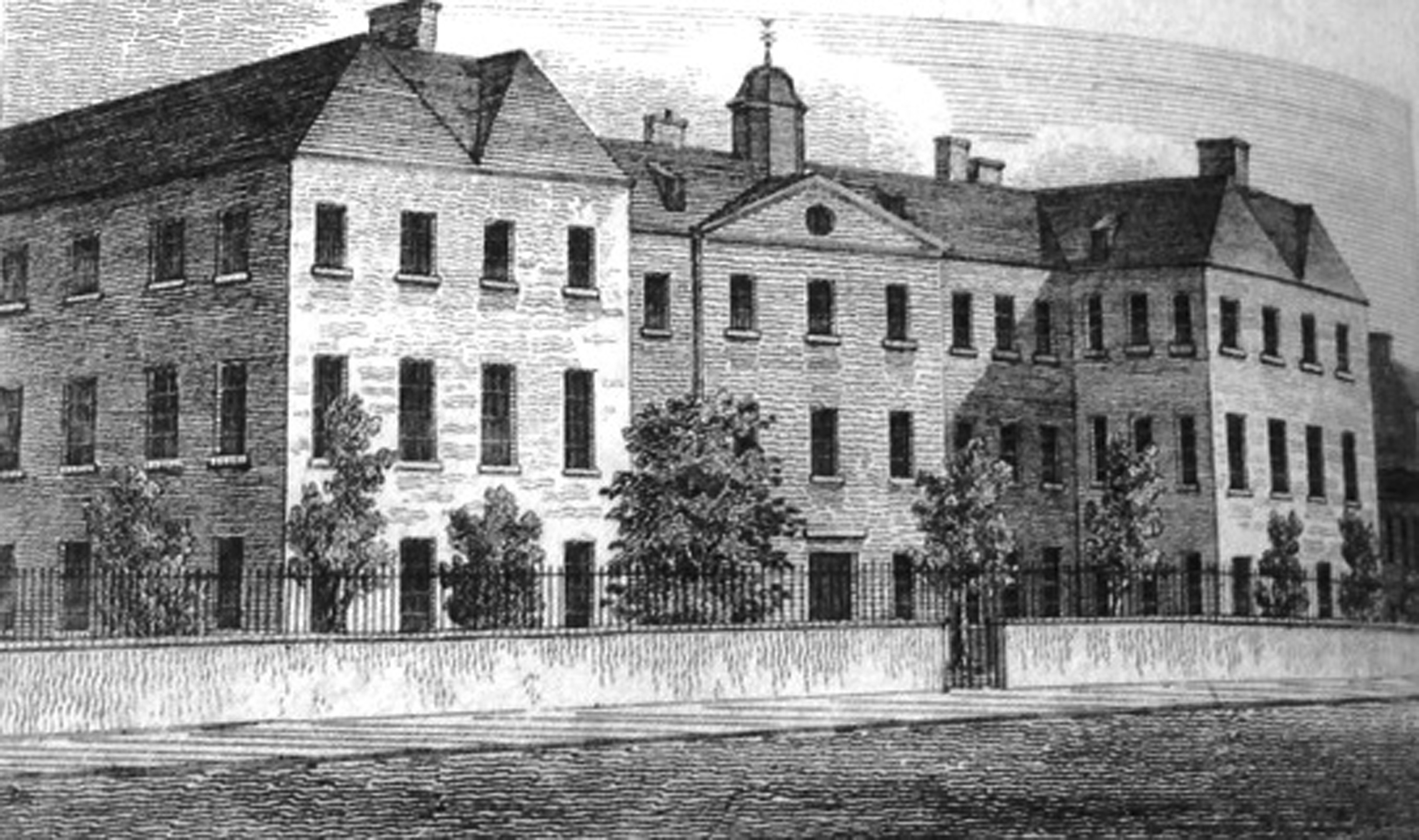
Engraving from the 1830s

The Town's Hospital was a poorhouse in Glasgow, Scotland, founded in 1731. It occupied a site at the Old Green on Great Clyde Street, at the junction of present-day Ropework Lane. The hospital was managed by the Lord Provost and 48 directors, 12 of whom were elected by the town council. Of the remainder, 12 represented the Church of Scotland's General Session, 12 the merchant's guild and 12 the producer's guild. A year after its opening the Town's Hospital accommodated 61 old people and 90 children.

The hospital closed in 1844, although it was reopened briefly in 1848 to house the victims of a cholera outbreak. It was demolished and a warehouse built on the site; its function as a home for the destitute poor of the parish was taken over by the Glasgow City Poorhouse, sometimes also known as the Town's Hospital. Opened in 1845, it occupied premises formerly known as the Glasgow Lunatic Asylum.
