= John Narrien =

John Narrien (1782–1860) was an English astronomical writer,

== Life ==
The son of a stonemason, Narrien was born at Chertsey, in Surrey. For some years he kept for an optician's shop in Pall Mall, London.

Narrien was nominated in 1814 as one of the teaching staff of the Royal Military College, Sandhurst. Promoted in 1820 to be mathematical professor in the senior department, he was long the effective head of the establishment. He was elected a Fellow of the Royal Society in 1840.

Narrine observed the partial solar eclipse of 6 May 1845, at the observatory of Sandhurst College. The failure of his eyesight caused him to give up his post at Sandhurst in 1858, and he retired that year also from the Royal Astronomical Society. He died at Kensington on 30 March 1860, aged 77. He had lost his wife eight years previously.

== Works ==
Narrien published in 1833 An Historical Account of the Origin and Progress of Astronomy. He also compiled a series of mathematical text-books for use in Sandhurst College, including Elements of Geometry, London, 1842; Practical Astronomy and Geodesy, 1845; and Analytical Geometry, 1846.

== Notes ==
Attribution

This article incorporates text from a publication now in the public domain: Lee, Sidney, ed. (1894). "Narrien, John". Dictionary of National Biography. Vol. 40. London: Smith, Elder & Co.
