= Opposition to the English poor laws =

Mr. Canning was once asked by Mr. Tierney why he did not touch the Poor Law? To which question Mr. Canning replied:— "Why do not Governments decide offhand a question growing out of the usages of centuries—interwoven with the habits, and deeply rooted in the prejudices of the people? Of all subjects of legislation on which Governments ought not harshly or prematurely to interfere, without ascertaining, and, if possible, carrying with them the prevailing sentiments of the country, this of the Poor Law appears to me the one on which it would be most undesirable to take a precipitate course."

From the reign of Elizabeth I (reigned 1558–1603) until the passage of the Poor Law Amendment Act 1834 relief of the poor in England was administered on the basis of a Poor Relief Act 1601. From the start of the nineteenth century the basic concept of providing poor relief was criticised as misguided by leading political economists and in southern agricultural counties the burden of poor-rates was felt to be excessive (especially where poor-rates were used to supplement low wages (the 'allowance' or Speenhamland system). Opposition to the Elizabethan Poor Law led to a Royal Commission on poor relief, which recommended that poor relief could not in the short term be abolished; however it should be curtailed, and administered on such terms that none but the desperate would claim it. Relief should only be administered in workhouses, whose inhabitants were to be confined, 'classified' (men, women, boys, girls) and segregated. The Poor Law Amendment Act 1834 allowed these changes to be implemented by a Poor Law Commission largely unaccountable to Parliament. The act was passed by large majorities in Parliament, but the regime it was intended to bring about was denounced by its critics as (variously) un-Christian, un-English, unconstitutional, and impracticable for the great manufacturing districts of Northern England. The Act itself did not introduce the regime, but introduced a framework by which it might easily be brought in.

Opposition to the New Poor Law strictly speaking was resistance to the introduction of the New Poor Law administrative framework; this was chiefly encountered in the industrial North in 1837–9 and overcome after a few riots by a judicious mixture of legal threats and deployment of the military. Opposition to the New Poor Law in the looser sense of resistance to (and criticism of) key features of the regime recommended by the Royal Commission persisted and eventually became orthodoxy: for example outdoor relief was never abolished in much of the industrial North. When a prominent West Riding opponent of the New Poor Law died in 1858, the Huddersfield Chronicle wrote "..the controversy closed and English common sense has settled down on the poor-law question somewhat nearer to the views of Oastler and Pitkethly than those of their opponents."

== Criticism of the Elizabethan poor law ==
Criticism of the Poor Law grew in the early nineteenth century after the Napoleonic Wars with France, especially among political economists.

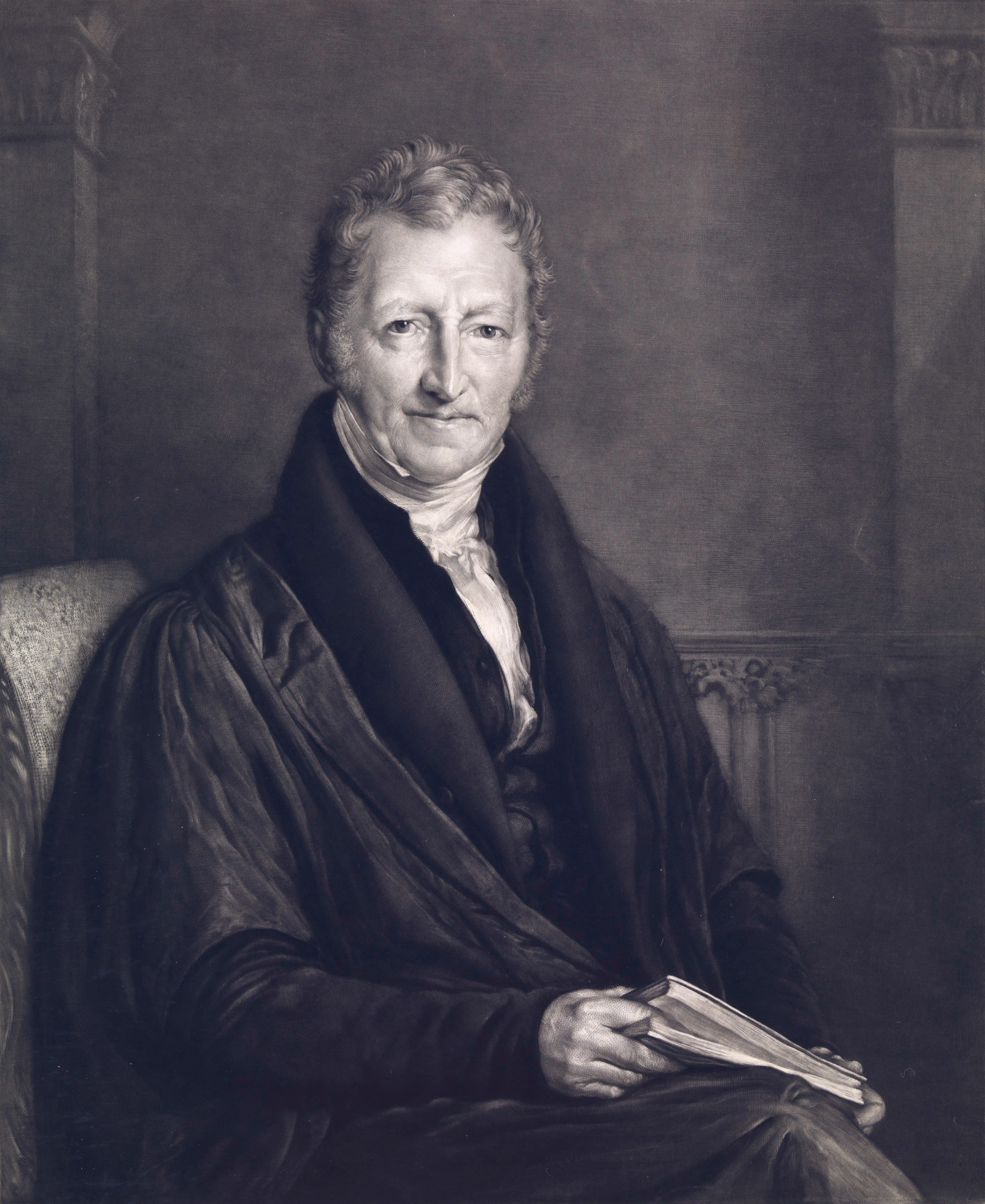
Malthus thought the Old Poor Law encouraged population growth.

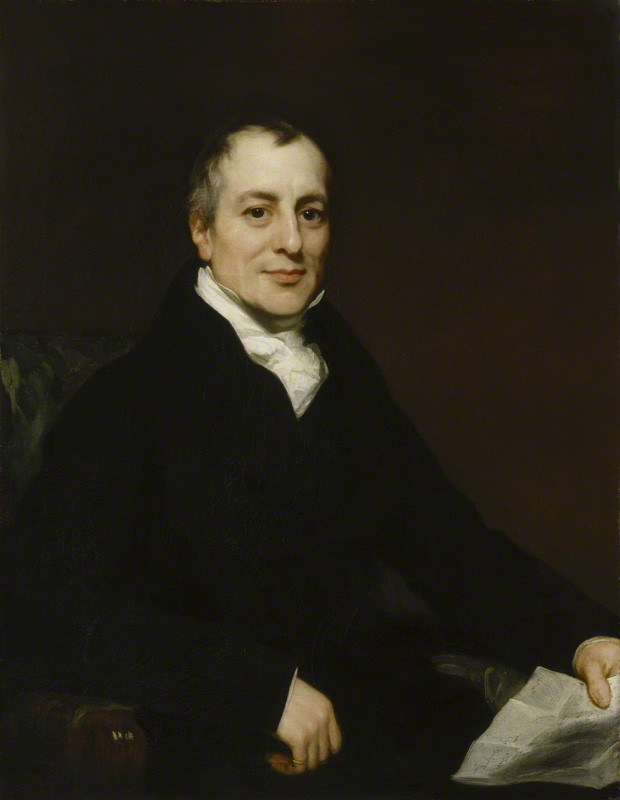
Ricardo argued that poor-rates reduced wages

Thomas Malthus thought any benevolence to the poor was self-defeating; the only check on the numbers of the poor was poverty. Furthermore, the Poor Law gave a right to relief only in the parish where the claimant had a right of settlement, obtained by birth or by prolonged residence: it undesirably limited the mobility of labour. Without the Poor Law there would be "a few more instances of severe distress," but "the aggregate mass of happiness among the common people would have been much greater than it is at present." However, he was one of the first to advocate so called 'indoor relief' in workhouses for the poor as opposed to outdoor relief (handouts in money or in kind, with recipients not under the control of poor-law authorities).

David Ricardo supported the abolition of the Poor Law in his book 'Principles of Political Economy and Taxation' published in 1817. Any tax raised to pay for welfare such as poor rates reduced the money available to pay wages. He also argued that it rewarded laziness, discouraged people from saving for old age or illness, and encouraged irresponsibly large families.

Edwin Chadwick, a member of the royal commission, and subsequently secretary of the Poor Law Commission, was a follower of Jeremy Bentham (who believed that wages would find their true levels in a free-market system where there was state control to maintain common agreed standards). Chadwick therefore criticized the Old Poor Law because its decentralised administration meant significant variation in the treatment of paupers. Chadwick held that the able-bodied poor should be put to work in workhouses which met the condition of less eligibility: they could not claim outdoor relief as they did under the existing Poor Law. Conditions had to be worse than those for the poorest labourer outside the workhouse, so that people would not want to claim relief. This would decrease the poor rate, allow wages to rise to their true levels, and promote honest toil.

"Every penny bestowed, that tends to render the condition of the pauper more eligible than that of the independent labourer, is a bounty on indolence and vice."

— 1832 Royal Commission

== Opposition to introduction of the New Poor Law ==
=== The 1832 Royal Commission ===
Alarmed at the cost of poor relief in the southern agricultural districts of England (where in many areas it had become a semi-permanent top-up of labourers' wages – the 'allowance system', 'Roundsman system', or 'Speenhamland system') Parliament had set up a Royal Commission into the operation of the Poor Laws. Its report had recommended sweeping changes unsurprisingly similar to those favoured by Chadwick:

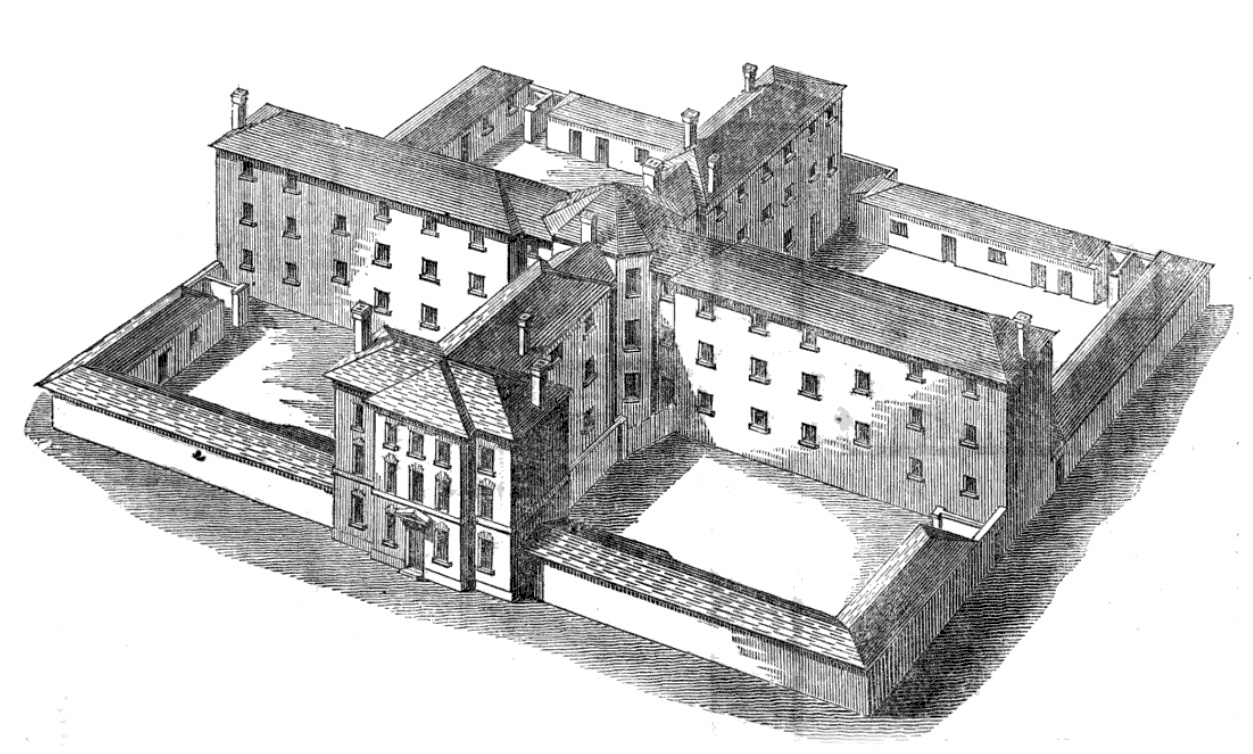
1835 model design of a workhouse to hold 300 paupers segregated into four classes

- Out-relief of the able-bodied poor should cease - relief should be given only in workhouses, and upon such terms that only the truly indigent would accept it. "Into such a house none will enter voluntarily; work, confinement, and discipline, will deter the indolent and vicious; and nothing but extreme necessity will induce any to accept the comfort which must be obtained by the surrender of their free agency, and the sacrifice of their accustomed habits and gratifications. "

Whilst this recommendation was a solution to existing problems consistent with 'political economy', there was little consideration in the report of what new problems it might give rise to . There was little practical experience to support it - only four of the parishes reporting had entirely abolished out-relief; their problem cases could well have simply been displaced to neighbouring parishes

- Different classes of paupers should be segregated; to this end parishes should pool together in unions, with each of their poorhouses dedicated to a single class of paupers and serving the whole of the union. "the separation of man and wife was necessary, in order to ensure the proper regulation of workhouses"

In practice, most existing workhouses were ill-suited to the new system (characterised by opponents as locking up the poor in 'Poor Law bastiles'), and many poor law unions soon found they needed a new purpose-built union workhouse. Their purpose being to securely confine large numbers of the lower classes at low cost, they not unnaturally looked much like prisons; this was not unwelcome to the New Poor Law authorities:"At present their prison-like appearance, and the notion that they are intended to torment the poor inspires a salutary dread of them."

- The new system would be undermined if different unions treated their paupers differently; there should therefore be a central board with powers to specify standards and to enforce those standards; this could not be done directly by Parliament because of the legislative workload that would ensue.

This arrangement was simultaneously justified as required to give absolute uniformity country-wide and as allowing regulations to be tailored to local circumstances without taking up Parliament's time.

- Mothers of illegitimate children should receive much less support; poor-law authorities should no longer attempt to identify the fathers of illegitimate children and recover the costs of child support from them

It was argued that penalising fathers of illegitimate children reinforced pressures for the parents of children conceived out of wedlock to marry, and generous payments for illegitimate children indemnified the mother against failure to marry. "The effect has been to promote bastardy; to make want of chastity on the woman's part the shortest road to obtaining either a husband or a competent maintenance; and to encourage extortion and perjury"

=== Poor Law Amendment Act 1834 ===
Acting on the recommendations of the royal commission, Parliament passed the Poor Law Amendment Act 1834, which however did not directly enact the recommendations. On illegitimacy it did not follow the recommendations of the Commission; under the New Poor Law fathers of illegitimate children could still be pursued; with however the crucial difference that under the old poor law the mother's sworn testimony was sufficient to establish paternity; under the New Poor Law the mother's word alone was insufficient; there had to be corroborative evidence. (Note: Clearly not modern paternity testing : "It was enough, as in cases of seduction, that the corroborating evidence should merely amount to this—that the parties had been seen together under circumstances which, if they were so inclined, would have favoured a criminal intercourse between them." at c1840 of) To implement the other recommendations the Act set up a three-man Poor Law Commission, an 'at arms' length' quango to which Parliament delegated the power to make appropriate regulations, without making any provision for effective oversight of the Commission's doings. Local poor-rates payers still elected their local Board of Poor Law Guardians and still paid for local poor law provisions, but those provisions could be specified to the Board of Guardians by the Poor Law Commission; where they were the views of the local rate-payers were irrelevant.

=== Opposition to the Poor Law Amendment Act 1834 ===
The radical MP William Cobbett voted against the Act, asserting that the poor had an automatic right to relief and that the Act aimed to "enrich the landowner" at the expense of the poor. The 'Tory Radical' Richard Oastler personally lobbied Tory leaders (including the Duke of Wellington) to oppose the Act. Oastler's objections were that the Act pursued aims dictated by political economy by un-Christian treatment of the poor (and particularly of the married poor: "whom God hath joined together let no man part asunder"), and to ensure this was done with consistent heartlessness was setting up an unconstitutional body. Oastler told the Duke "if that Bill passes, the man who can produce the greatest confusion in the country will be the greatest patriot, and I will try to be that man". However the Duke was unconvinced; Tory landowners were as keen on reducing poor rates as were the Whigs, and the Bill received little opposition from either the House of Commons or the House of Lords before gaining Royal Assent. John Fielden, an industrialist and owner of textile mills at Todmorden and MP for Oldham (where he had secured Cobbett's election) was like Cobbett a strong opponent of the New Poor Law, and after Cobbett's death was part of a small group of MPs who called for review of the working of the Act - Fielden further called for its repeal -: all that was achieved was a Select Committee which took most of its evidence from the Poor Law Commission and other Poor Law functionaries and consequently found much to praise and little to blame.

=== Resistance to the New Poor Law structures ===
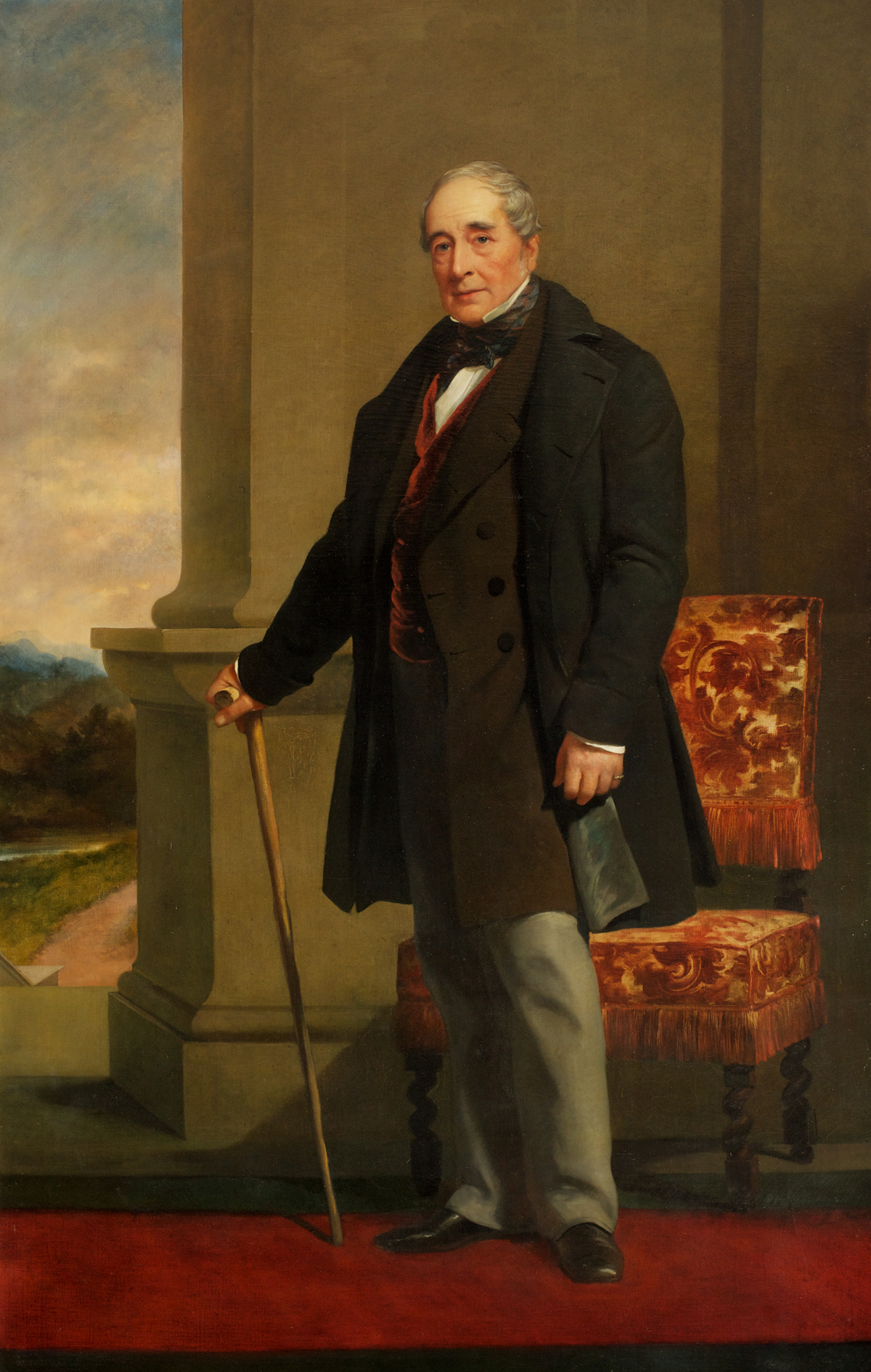
One of the 'Somerset House Despots': Sir Thomas Frankland Lewis, (Chairman of Poor Law Commission 1834–39)

==== South of England ====
The new dispensation was implemented progressively, starting with the southern counties of England, whose problems it was designed to address. There it achieved a considerable reduction in the poor rates with only minor disturbances (In Buckinghamshire when paupers were transported 3 miles from Chalfont St. Giles to Amersham, the Riot Act had to be read. In East Anglia new workhouses were attacked.) "Partial riots have occurred in different counties; but, by the aid of small parties of the Metropolitan Police ... occasionally aided by the support of military force, these disturbances have been put down, without any considerable injury to property."

==== North of England ====
There had been no great dissatisfaction with the existing Poor Law in the North, the burden of poor relief being lower (in 1832 under the old Poor Law Lancashire, with a population about 280% that of Kent, had poor relief costs only about 80% those of Kent). The rate of increase in the cost of poor-relief was no of concern either: in Sheffield the cost of poor-relief in 1833 was half what it had been ten years before. (Note: Later in the 1830s it was argued that the perception that poor-rates were a steadily increasing burden was only locally true; over the nation as a whole, in the last 20 years wealth had increased faster than the cost of poor-relief) Correspondingly there had been no urgent need to implement the New Poor Law. Not until January 1837 were the first steps taken to introduce the system into the textile districts of Lancashire and the West Riding of Yorkshire by setting up 'poor law unions' and electing Boards of Guardians for them. The Poor Law Boards were then to appoint a clerk to administer whatever system of relief was specified for that Union by the central Commission.

Inquiries in the West Riding of Yorkshire by an assistant to the royal commission had led him to note that out-door relief was an important (and relatively cheap) way of coping with the trade cycle. When trade was slack manufacturers could lay off 500 hands at once - this was a scale for which it would be impracticable to provide workhouse accommodation; where unemployment was likely to be temporary (e.g. caused by the trade cycle or sickness) the eventual cost (and inconvenience) of re-establishing a household on leaving the workhouse had to be borne in mind and could well suggest the wisdom of out-door relief. Furthermore, where the head of a household containing child wage-earners became unemployed, it would be more sensible (and cheaper) to supplement the household income by a judicious amount of out-door relief than to move the family to the poorhouse. (Note: Factory children were always in demand in the textile districts; particularly after the Factory Act 1833 reduced their (legally permitted) hours of work) Hand-loom weavers, a group of workers now habitually in great distress, had very low earnings; not because their wages were supplemented by out-door relief, but because they were competing with power-looms; nothing would be gained by forcing them into the workhouse or to turn to some occupation for which they would not have the required physical strength. The Assistant Commissioner also noted that diet of West-Riding poorhouse inmates was not a deterrent; there seemed to be a deliberate policy of 'the best of everything, and plenty of it'.

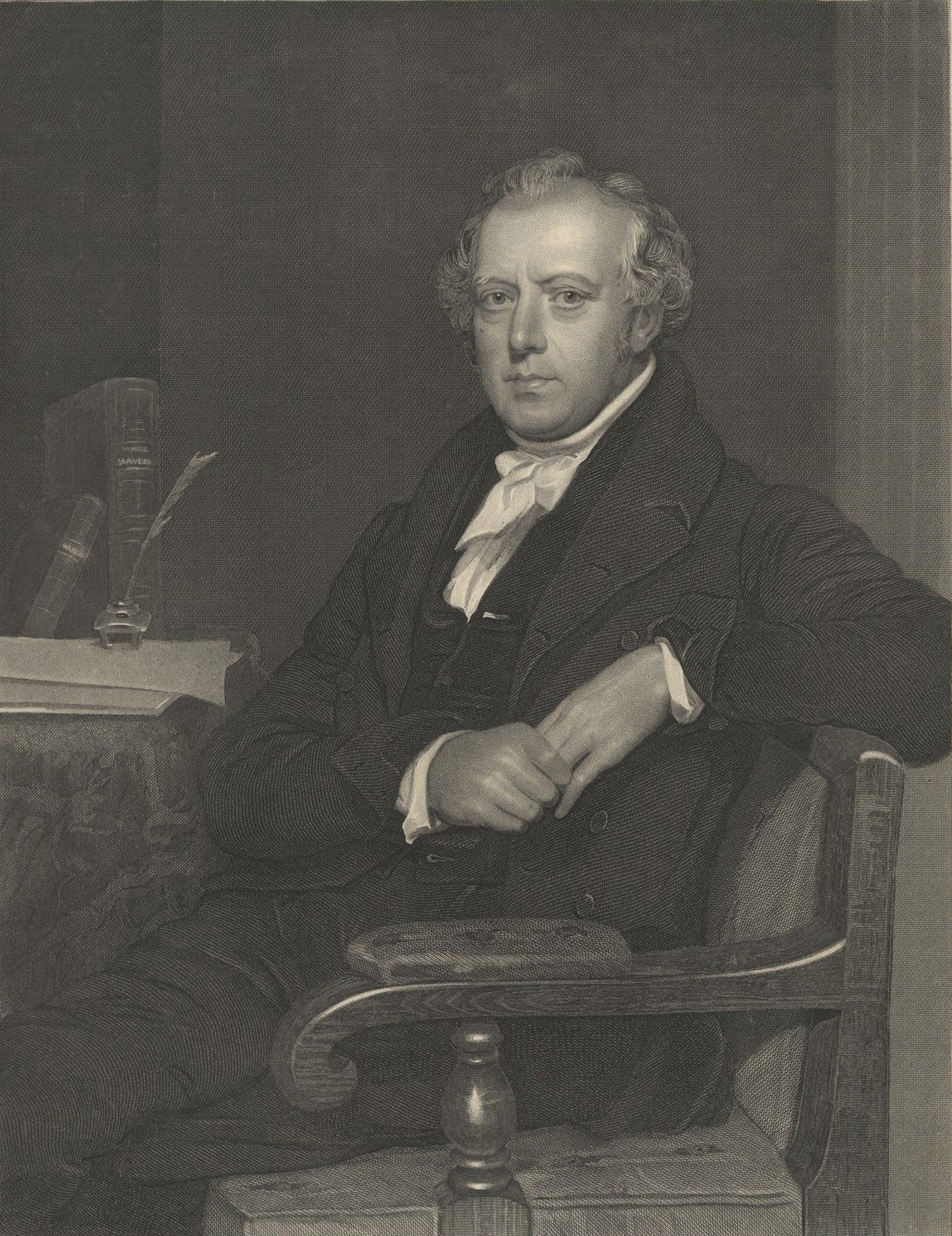
Richard Oastler: "a gross and wicked law .. if it was truth, the Bible was a lie"

The Poor Law Commission intended (or said they intended) to allow the new Poor Law Boards in manufacturing areas to continue out-door relief, but opponents of the New Poor Law held that the safest way to defend out-door relief and the rest of the status quo was to prevent the New Poor Law administrative framework becoming established. Hence they strove to prevent new Poor Law Boards being established (or to elect Guardians hostile to the New Poor Law who would obstruct or delay clerks to Poor Law Boards being appointed), since their existence would allow the Poor Law Commission to specify changes in the regime of existing poorhouses and greatly facilitate the cessation of out-door relief should the Commission change its mind (or not be telling the truth).

In the Northern industrial towns, a variety of organisations (trade unions, Short Time Committees, Radical associations )were already in existence whose (often overlapping) memberships were generally opposed to the New Poor Law. Local Anti-Poor Law Associations sprang up able to readily mobilise large numbers for protest meetings against the Act, and against its local implementation. Many of the leaders of the anti-poor law movement had previously been prominent in the Ten Hours Movement

Richard Oastler wrote letters to Yorkshire newspapers like the Leeds Intelligencer and to the national Radical press denouncing the Poor Law Amendment Act as being cruel and unchristian. He spoke in similar vein at anti-New Poor Law meetings; his first speech (to a mass meeting in Huddersfield) was subsequently published under the (representative) title of Damnation! Eternal damnation to the fiend-begotten 'coarser-food', new Poor Law !). Huddersfield was notably slow to set up an effective New Poor Law administration, large crowds/mobs gathering outside (or breaking up) meetings of the Guardians, but never with enough violence to lead local Tory magistrates to ask for military assistance to preserve order. (When Whig magistrates were appointed and the military deployed, the Guardians meeting was subject to a large peaceful picket which terminated with the crowd giving a cheer for the troops for having had to turn out on a miserable January night and a whip-round to give them a shilling each to buy something warm and comfortable)

John Fielden attempted to prevent the Act from being implemented in his area, threatening to close the family firm down unless the Guardians of the Todmorden Poor Law Union resigned. When they didn't the Fielden mills duly closed, throwing nearly 3,000 out of work. The Guardians stood firm, troops were moved into the area, and after a week Fieldens re-opened (paying their employees as normal for the week not worked) However, some townships refused to recognise the authority of the Guardians. and instructed (or intimidated) their 'overseer of the poor' to ignore the Guardians' instructions. The overseer of Langfield was fined £5 for disobeying the Guardians and two constables sent from Halifax to distrain goods to that value. The constables were surrounded by a mob summoned from two of Fielden's mills (supplemented by navvies building the Manchester & Leeds Railway), roughly treated and made to promise never to return. The following week a mob again gathered in the belief that another attempt at distraint was to be made; when this did not happen, they attacked the houses of various guardians and supporters of the New Poor Law, causing damage put at over £1000.

== Extra-parliamentary opposition to the New Poor Law regime ==
While there were protests in towns such as Oldham, Huddersfield, and Bradford (where the Poor Law Guardians had to be protected by troops after riots against the Act), in other areas the New Poor Law administrative framework was set in place with much less difficulty. Even in Huddersfield the new administrative framework was in place within two years. However, opposition to the New Poor Law did not cease once its structures were in place. Outside Parliament, agitation and mass meetings continued. Horror stories of (mis)-treatment of paupers under the New Poor Law not only featured in the speeches of its opponents; they also circulated in Chartist newspapers such as Augustus Beaumont's Northern Liberator and Feargus O'Connor's Northern Star and were collected in George R. Wythen Baxter's The Book of the Bastilles. Not all the stories were entirely accurate, and some propaganda was very black; a document recommending infanticide and alleged to be the work of the Poor Law Commission was published as the Book of Murder.

=== Relationship to Chartism ===
The ease with which the Reform Parliament had passed the Poor Law Amendment Act 1834, its refusal to pass a Ten-Hour Bill and the contrast between the zeal with which the New Poor Law was brought in and the failure to enforce the Factory Act 1833 were powerful arguments that only the fundamental political changes sought by Chartism would produce a Parliament which paid more than lip-service to the interests of the working classes. Consequently, the anti-poor law movement became almost inextricably linked with Chartism. The leaders of the Anti-Poor Law movement differed in their response to Chartism. Oastler would have nothing to do with it, and continued to speak only on the Poor Law and on Factory Reform (but to audiences of largely Chartist tendencies). He called upon his hearers to exercise their right to bear arms (but not to bring them to meetings); he also warned (but was careful not to threaten) that a social cataclysm would result if the government were to further oppress the poor. J. R. Stephens, a Methodist minister who had been prominent in both the Factory Reform and Anti-Poor Law movements addressed Chartist meetings, giving much the same advice as Oastler, and was a delegate to the National Convention, but later said "I would rather walk to London on my bare knees, on sharp flint stones to attend an Anti-poor Law meeting, than be carried to London in a coach and six, pillowed with down to present that petition - the "national petition" to the House of Commons" Stephens was less prudent than Oastler in his speeches and failed to persuade those coming to his meetings to leave their guns at home. Consequently, when the Government cracked down on Chartist activity after the Todmorden Riots (in which - despite the insinuations of the Manchester Guardian - Fielden could not be implicated), Stephens was imprisoned for eighteen months for unlawful assembly. Fielden deprecated the use of force, or any hint of the use of force, and hence advised against the acquisition of arms. Initially, he had striven to prevent Anti-Poor Law meetings alienating non-Chartist sympathisers by discussing other Chartist demands, but at the height of the Chartist agitation of 1838 he abandoned this position. Instead, thinking that the poor law would never be reformed until Parliament had been remodelled along the lines called for by the Chartists' National Petition, he spoke at Chartist meetings and urged Chartists to concentrate on the fundamental reforms they sought and not allow themselves to be bought off with concessions on the Poor Law and Factory Reform. With the failure of the National Petition, and the consequent drift of Chartism away from 'moral force' to 'physical force', (which Fielden could not support) he reverted to his original position; that (once again) the Anti-Poor Law movement had a better chance of success if it remained distinct from more general Chartist agitation.

Even after the crack-down, the Commissioners admitted that they were influenced by the agitation: "The depressed condition of the manufacturing population, to which we have already adverted, and the disquietude of the public mind occasioned by the chartist riot at Newport, in Monmouthshire, rendered us extremely unwilling to take any step in the manufacturing districts of Lancashire which might have even a remote tendency to produce a disturbance, or which might be used by designing persons as a pretext for agitation"

=== Attacks on workhouses ===
On two occasions in the 1840s, newly built workhouses were sacked by rioters, but on neither occasion was the riot clearly single-issue:

- In 1842, during the Plug Plot Riots, the Stockport Union Workhouse at Shaw Heath was attacked and sacked by rioters, being eventually dispersed by the Cheshire Yeomanry
- In 1843, during the Rebecca Riots of 1842–43 a force of several thousand Rebeccaites, including 300 farmers on horseback entered Carmarthen demanding not only the removal of toll-gates, but also the abolition of tithes and church rates, fairer rents and 'the alteration of the present poor-law to which they expressed the most bitter hostility'. They then proceeded to attack Carmarthen Workhouse, entered it and were sacking it when the military (a troop of the 4th Dragoons) arrived and restored order.

== Mounting opposition in Parliament ==
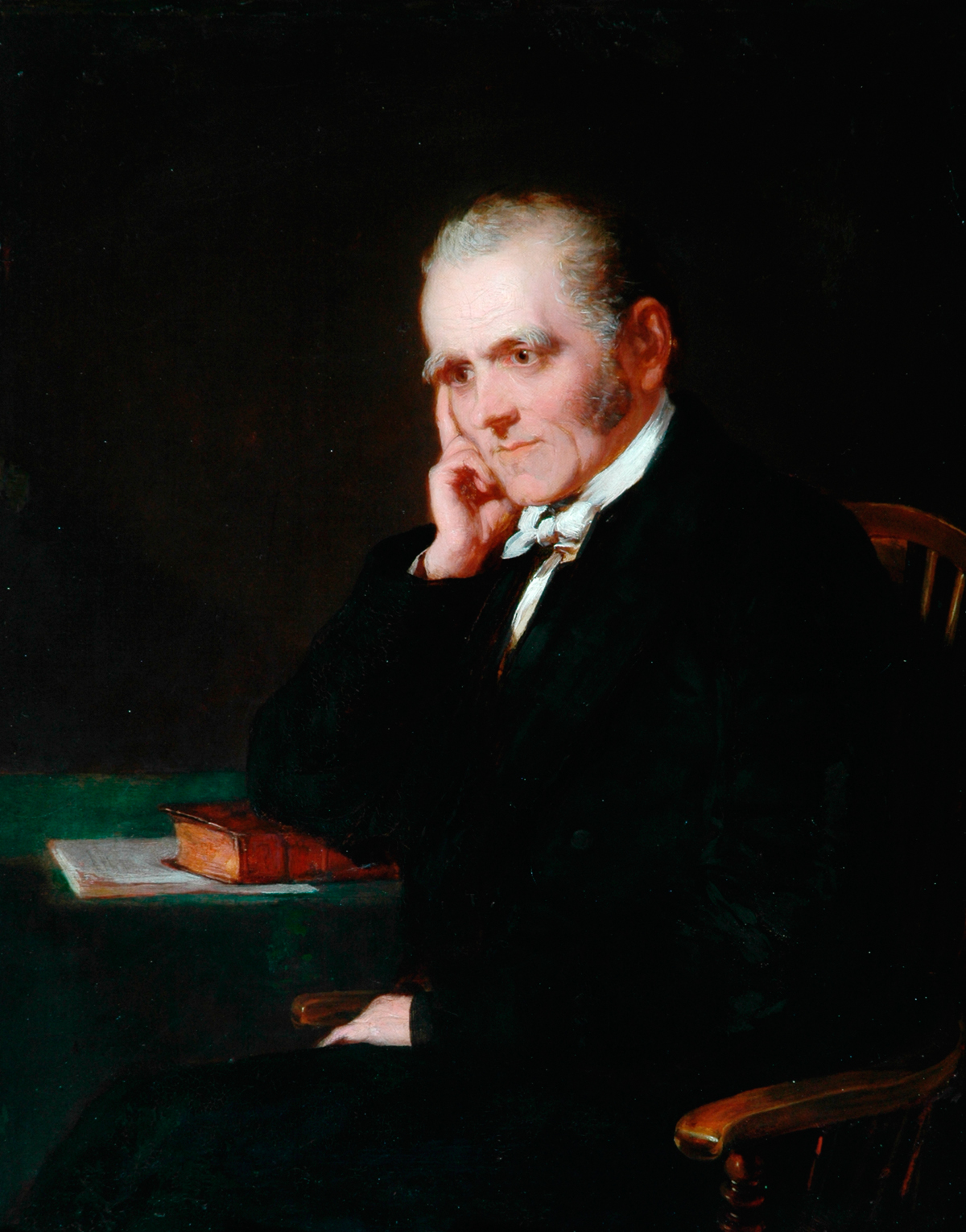
John Fielden: MP for Oldham and determined Parliamentary opponent of the New Poor Law

Criticism slowly mounted: when the Whigs introduced a Poor Law Amendment Bill in 1841 to extend the Commission's life, MPs complained of the pettiness of some of the rules called for by the Poor Law Commission (e.g. workhouse inmates to take their meals in silence), of the refusal of the Commissioners to allow Boards of Guardians much discretion, and of the way the Commission had evaded Parliamentary scrutiny. A general election occurred before the Bill was passed, and the Conservatives came to power, with some of their MPs stating that they owed their seats to the opposition they had professed to the New Poor-law; the government, however, came forward with a Bill to extend the Commission to 1847, and to make minor amendments to the Poor Law. Whilst there continued to be cross-party Front Bench support for the New Poor Law (in 1844 in Coningsby, Benjamin Disraeli mocked Peel's 'sound Conservative government' as 'Tory men and Whig measures') Conservative malcontents such as Disraeli were alive to the consequent opportunity to undermine Peel by allying themselves with the opposition to unpopular Whig measures. The Bill made very slow progress (opponents made lengthy speeches; Fielden repeatedly moved adjournment of the debate), and many clauses were dropped in order to secure its passage before the existing authorisation of the Commission lapsed. The previous proceedings of the Poor Law Commission were not endorsed unequivocably : ("My Lords, I don't mean to say that I approve of every act that has been done in carrying this bill into operation. I think that in many cases those who had charge of the working of the bill have gone too far") it was now stressed that the virtue of the Commission was that it supported diversity, rather than that it was necessary to achieve uniformity; administratively 'special rules' were to be as far as possible consolidated into general rules laid before Parliament. A further Poor Law Amendment Act was passed in 1844; its main effect was to again revise the treatment of unmarried mothers: in Committee stage many amendments seeking to relax the poor law regime were rebuffed by the Home Secretary on the argument that - correctly understood - the existing rules and regulations of the Poor Law Commission already permitted the relaxation sought.

=== Scottish Poor Law Commission critical of 'workhouse test' ===
A Commission of Enquiry into the Scottish poor laws (which, in principle, unlike the English did not give relief to the able-bodied poor (Note: not withstanding which, relief was given to the able-bodied poor in areas badly affected by the Highland Potato Famine)), set up in 1843 and reporting in May 1844 came to conclusions which differed significantly from its English predecessor, being critical of the effect of the 'workhouse test' on those subjected to it:

" It did not promote the development of any intellectual energy, neither did it foster feelings of manliness and independence. Its influence dries up the last impulses of social life. It destroys all feelings of self-respect and alienates the inmates from almost every sympathy which either in equals or superiors is inherent in rightly constituted natures. Repulsion and discomfort being the sole means by which this workhouse test works—that repulsion and discomfort must be carefully kept up for its operation."

and of the argument that as a 'self-acting test' it had the great virtue of removing any need for moral judgement on applicants:

"We hold that no just system of Poor Laws can exist, excluding, in the distribution of relief, the consideration of character—which should be a fundamental consideration. The man who has conducted himself with activity and industry for the bettering of his condition, and has only fallen through misfortune, not by fault, has a just title to the sympathy of his fellow-men. And not only that the necessary relief be cheerfully accorded, but full scope given for all the ministrations of charity to his comfort."

== Andover workhouse scandal and subsequent inquiries ==
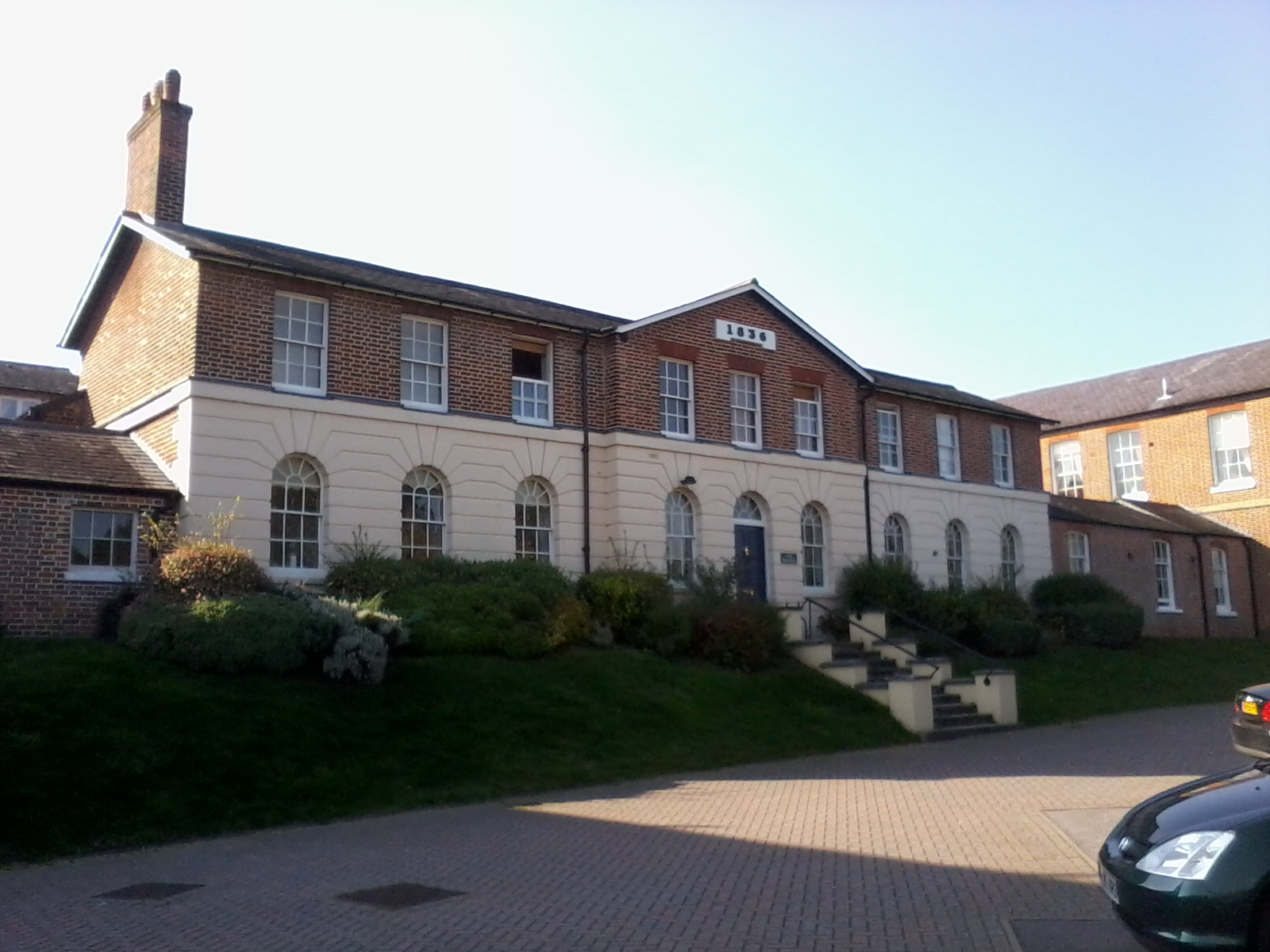
Andover workhouse

In 1845, it was alleged that paupers at the Andover Union workhouse employed in crushing bones were (regardless of age or state of decay) eating marrow from the bones and gnawing off any shreds of meat still adherent. When reported to the guardians, they had neither intervened, nor informed the Poor Law Commissioners. (Note: The initial complainant had therefore gone to his MP, who had raised the matter in Parliament) The Assistant Poor Law Commissioner for the area (a Mr Parker) was sent to investigate, and found the allegations to be largely true, if slightly over-stated. This had been going on for some time without being detected by the Poor Law Commission's supervisory regime (in the first instance Mr Parker). The Home Secretary had on a number of occasions told the House of Commons that grinding bone was work of too penal a nature to be carried out by workhouse inmates, and the Poor Law Commission would see that his wish that it should cease was acted upon. The crushed bones were mostly sold to the guardians(for use as fertiliser) at a price which did not represent good value for the rate-payer.

=== Public hearings by Assistant Poor Law Commissioner ===
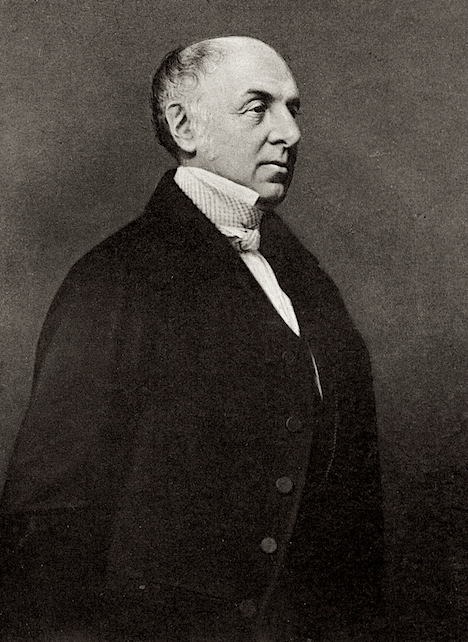
Sir James Graham - Home Secretary at the time

On the instructions of the Commission Parker then heard in public (poorly specified) charges against the master of the workhouse of diverting some of the paupers' rations for his own use, improper behaviour towards pauper girls, sleeping with inmates, conducting prayers when drunk, etc., but nothing relating to the bone-crushing. Parker was critical (many papers thought over-critical) of the prosecution witnesses, even criticising the workhouse medical officer for not keeping his books in the form prescribed by the Poor Law Commission, when the books were in the form directed by the Andover Guardians, and Parker was more demonstrably at fault since his routine duties included inspecting workhouse books to ensure that they met the Poor Law Commission's requirements. The hearings were adjourned to give the master of the workhouse time to prepare his defence and witnesses, but before the time allowed was up the Commissioners stopped the enquiry, recommended suspension of the master and (on the assumption that that recommendation would be acted upon) suggested complainants prosecute him on specimen charges at Quarter Sessions. The complainants declined; seeing this not as an escalation of proceedings, but an attempt to evade a verdict against the master, pointing out that whilst the charges against the master (if true) showed him unfit to hold his post, they were unlikely to support a conviction. The Times, saying the behaviour of the Somerset House set was like that of a cheat at cards, held open hearings of witnesses to the bone-crushing and -gnawing. (Note: extensive extracts from that evidence can be found in) The guardians voted not to suspend the master; his wife was however suspended, having physically attacked witnesses against her husband. The Commission then ordered the immediate resumption of the inquiry, allowing no further time for the master to prepare his defence.: the resumed enquiry was now attended by a shorthand writer taking an accurate record and reporting it to the Home Secretary (no accurate record of proceedings had previously been taken, leading to arguments about what previous witnesses had said). No sooner had the enquiry resumed than it was terminated by the master's resignation.

=== Assistant Poor Law Commissioner 'resigns' and retaliates ===
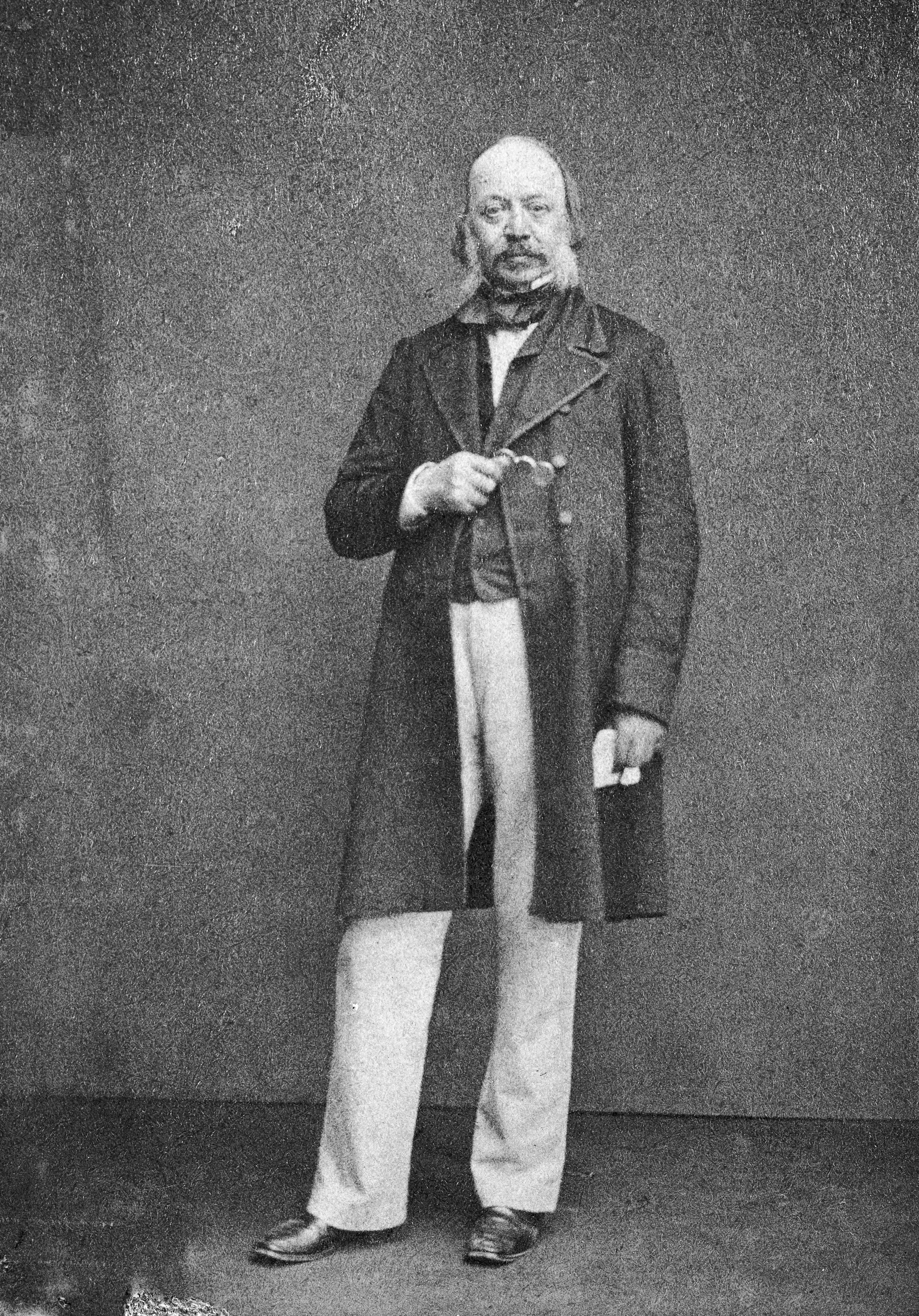
Edwin Chadwick (Secretary to the Poor Law Commission) in later life

The guardians asked the master to stay on until a permanent replacement was chosen; Parker insisted this was unacceptable and recommended a former master of the Oxford Union workhouse (a Mr C Price) as a locum. The Times promptly revealed that Price had resigned from the Oxford post when serious allegations had been made against him. (Note: He had been master at Oxford 1840-44. He had started off on the wrong foot with some of his Guardians and in 1844 had been dismissed by a meeting of the Guardians, applied for the job when advertised and been selected as his own replacement by a differently attended board. The Poor Law Commission then started an inquiry into the allegations used to support his dismissal (The allegations investigated before Price's resignation might not be the most serious ones: at Andover, allegations were investigated in the order in which they were made, not in order of decreasing gravity) Price (even before obtaining the Oxford mastership) was owed £3000 by Mr Mott.) Price had resigned his post at Oxford whilst complaints against him were being investigated by an Assistant Poor Law Commissioner; The Poor Law Commission originally claimed that a report had been submitted to them, but gone unread because of Price's resignation; they then admitted than once Price had resigned the investigation was abandoned without their knowledge by the Assistant Commissioner, and no record of it (or indication that it had been undertaken) kept by the Commission. The Poor Law Commission insisted on Price resigning and instructed Parker to resign. He did, but then published a pamphlet (Letters to the Right Hon. Sir James Graham, Bart; on the Subject of Recent Proceedings connected with the Andover Union By H. W. Parker, Esq. Barrister at Law.) justifying himself and detailing conversations with the Commission and with the Home Secretary which alleged that

- although the Home Secretary had communicated his views on bone-crushing to the Commission in 1842, and Edwin Chadwick (Secretary to the Commission) had circulated a paper reaching the same conclusion, the Commission had issued no rule or direction on the matter, because there was disagreement within the Commission as to whether they had powers to do so
- the Home Secretary had met Parker and a Poor Law Commissioner so they could construct an agreed narrative reflecting as little discredit upon themselves as possible

=== Select Committee on the Andover Union ===
It was separately alleged that the Commission had attempted to discredit a Yorkshire MP critical of it by sending an Assistant Poor Law Commissioner (Charles Mott) to inspect and unfavourably report upon the conditions in and management of a workhouse of which the MP was a guardian; that report had then been quoted (in good faith) by the Home Secretary in the Commons. Against the advice of the Home Secretary (who dismissed the affair as a "workhouse squabble") the House of Commons voted for a Committee to enquire into the management of the Andover workhouse, and into the conduct of the Poor Law Commissioners and Mr Parker Further questions arose as to the dismissal of the Assistant Commissioner for Wales (the reasons given by the Commissioners and the Home Secretary being markedly different) and to the propriety of the Haydock Lodge Lunatic Asylum for lunatic paupers being owned by a serving assistant secretary to the Commission and Mr Mott (no longer an Assistant Commissioner, but a poor law auditor). The Andover Committee revealed an underlying split between the Commissioners and Chadwick, each party feeling that they should have had more power and the other less. As a consequence of this split both parties were happy to share with the Committee the shortcomings of the other. Sir Frankland Lewis, the first Chairman of the Commission gave evidence that Chadwick had written an order that bells should not be tolled at the funeral of a pauper, and - having waited until Lewis (who Chadwick knew was opposed to any such ban) was absent - induced the Commissioners to issue the order. It became apparent that the important business of the Commissioners had not been conducted (as the Act establishing them required) by minuted meetings as a Board, nor had adequate records been kept of their decisions and the reasons for them. Chadwick's evidence to the Committee confirmed what had previously generally been taken to be a wild allegation by the wilder opponents of the New Poor Law: that in 1834 the Commission had indicated in a secret briefing paper for ministers that they intended to completely taper-out out-door relief for all classes of paupers (not just the able-bodied), to coarsen the diet of paupers, reduce its quantity, and enforce strict regulations. Ministers had repeatedly denied the existence of any such paper or any such plan. The findings of the committee (quoted verbatim in) characterised the Commissioners' conduct on matters within the committee's terms of reference as "irregular and arbitrary, not in accordance with the statute under which they exercise their functions, and such as to shake public confidence in their administration of the law", going on to note that the committee had in passing heard worrying evidence on matters outside its terms of reference on which it would be improper to base findings.

== Poor Law Commission replaced by Poor Law Board ==
The Peel administration fell in the aftermath of the repeal of the Corn Laws, and the new (Whig) Home Secretary denied that the Andover Committee had demonstrated malice, recklessness or illegality in the proceedings of the Commission but promised that it would be replaced. The Poor Law Amendment Act 1847 replaced the Poor Law Commission with a Poor Law Board, the President of which sat in the Commons. The Annual Report of the Board would be laid before Parliament (the Commission's Annual Report had been to the Home Secretary); the nine Assistant Commissioners remained in post but were re-titled Inspectors, and three further Inspectors were recruited. The Poor Law Board took up its duties in December 1847; in preparation for this a Consolidated General Order detailing the 'general rules' which it intended to apply to poor relief were issued in July 1847 by the outgoing Commission. The powers of the Board were not materially different to those of the Commission, but they were applied in a different spirit: for example, whereas the Commission had to be applied to for (and had repeatedly refused) authorisation of any deviation from the normal workhouse diet on Christmas Day, (Note: Formerly custom and practice for prisoners and paupers alike. So at Christmas 1840 at Leicester the prisoners in the borough jail were given beef and plum pudding by order of the magistrates, those in the county jail beef and ale by order of the High Sheriff, the debtors in the county jail were presented by a private benefactor with an excellent Christmas dinner of plum pudding roast beef and ale and "the poor in the Billesdon Union Workhouse were plentifully supplied with plum pudding, roast beef, ale and tobacco on Christmas day, by a subscription entered into by the Guardians of the above Union for that purpose, the Poor Law Commissioners having given strict orders there should be no feasting or treating in any union on that day") the new general rules explicitly noted that this was permitted. The 'New Poor Law' remained, but its underlying intent had been largely defeated. At the end of 1849, the Chartist paper the Northern Star was hopeful of achieving an extension of the franchise, drawing encouragement from the fate of the other great agitations going on when the Star had been founded twelve years before: ..now, when the Ten Hours"Bill" has become an ACT; now, when the Poor Law Commission has become a Poor Law BOARD; and the ultra-Malthusianism of the one has been replaced by a policy more in accordance with humanity and reason".
