= National Association of United Trades for the Protection of Labour =

UK trade union federation

The National Association of United Trades for the Protection of Labour was an early trade union federation in the United Kingdom, established in 1845.

No attempt had been made to co-ordinate the activities of trade unions in various industries across the country since the failure of the Grand National Consolidated Trades Union in 1834. The idea to found the organisation was first proposed by the Chartist newspaper the Northern Star, and was then taken up by the United Trades of Sheffield, who lobbied the Member of Parliament Thomas Duncombe. This encouraged the Central Association of London Trades to convene a preliminary meeting for trade unionists in the city, which called a national conference for Easter 1845, held at London's Parthenium. The conference founded the Association, appointing Duncombe as President and editor of the Northern Star Joshua Hobson to the Central Committee.

Unlike the Grand National, which had aimed to rationalise the number of unions and encourage the formation of general unions, the Association's primary aim was to allow the existing unions to more effectively lobby Parliament for industrial reforms.

At its second conference, in July 1845, the Association formed a companion organisation, the National Association of United Trades for the Employment of Labour. This promoted Robert Owen's concept of "union shops" - essentially producers' co-operatives. It also aimed to resettle workers on the land, an ambition which mirrored the contemporary Chartist Land Plan, but one which never came to fruition.

From August 1848 until the following summer, the Association issued a weekly journal, the Labour League. However, this was to prove the end of its period of high activity. In 1852, Duncombe stood down as President, and was replaced by G. A. Fleming, the new editor of the Northern Star. The Association continued to lobby Parliament, and finally saw some success with the passing of the Molestation of Workmen Act in 1859. It then focussed on proposing a Conciliation Bill. George Howell claimed that it was not dissolved until 1867, although George Odger claimed that its existence was "a perfect myth" by 1866, when the United Kingdom Alliance of Organised Trades was founded.
