= Book of Murder =

1830s English propaganda work

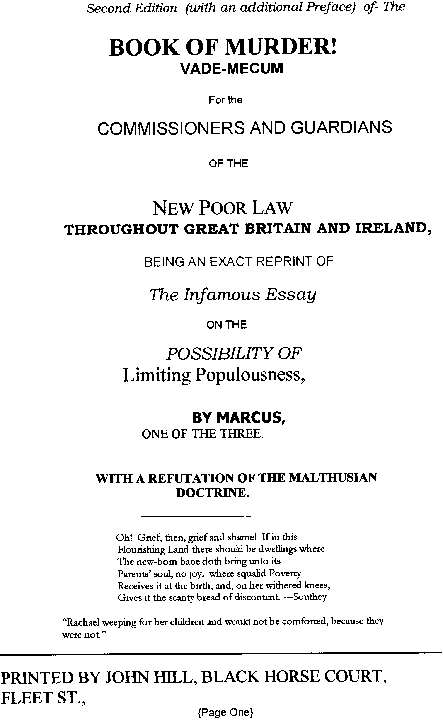
Front cover of the Book of Murder

The Book of Murder, also known as the Marcus Affair, was a piece of propaganda written in the 1830s in opposition to the English Poor Laws. It was presented as the work of one pseudonymous "Marcus", and was published by Joshua Hobson. It aimed to incite opposition to the Poor Law Amendment Act 1834, which had altered the nature of poor relief (how the state cared for poor people) in England and Wales. Previously, paupers were eligible for "outdoor relief" (handouts in money or in kind, with recipients living in their own homes); this shifted to "indoor relief", meaning that workhouses were built, institutions to provide shelter and basic sustenance.

The book came from two pamphlets by "Marcus" – "An Essay of Populousness" and "On the Possibility of Limiting Populousness", which discussed possible infanticide used to tackle a population explosion and killing by gas. The anti-Poor Law campaign alleged these pamphlets were the work of Poor Law Commissioners who were known to hold views on population similar to Thomas Malthus. The movement also alleged that copies of the original pamphlet had been suppressed.

One of the first to use the Marcus pamphlet to popularize the idea of a conspiracy against the poor in Radical and Chartist circles was the Reverend Joseph Rayner Stephens, a proponent of violent resistance to the government who made numerous references to the alleged conspiracy while traveling across the country during the period between his December 1838 arrest and 1839 imprisonment.

The books were published by the Chartist leader Feargus O'Connor in the Northern Star.

== See also ==
- A Modest Proposal by Jonathan Swift, a satirical essay proposing the eating of children
