= Alice Mann =

Alice Mann may refer to:

- Alice Mann (actress)
- Alice Mann (politician)
- Alice Mann (printer)
