= Joshua Hobson =

British publisher

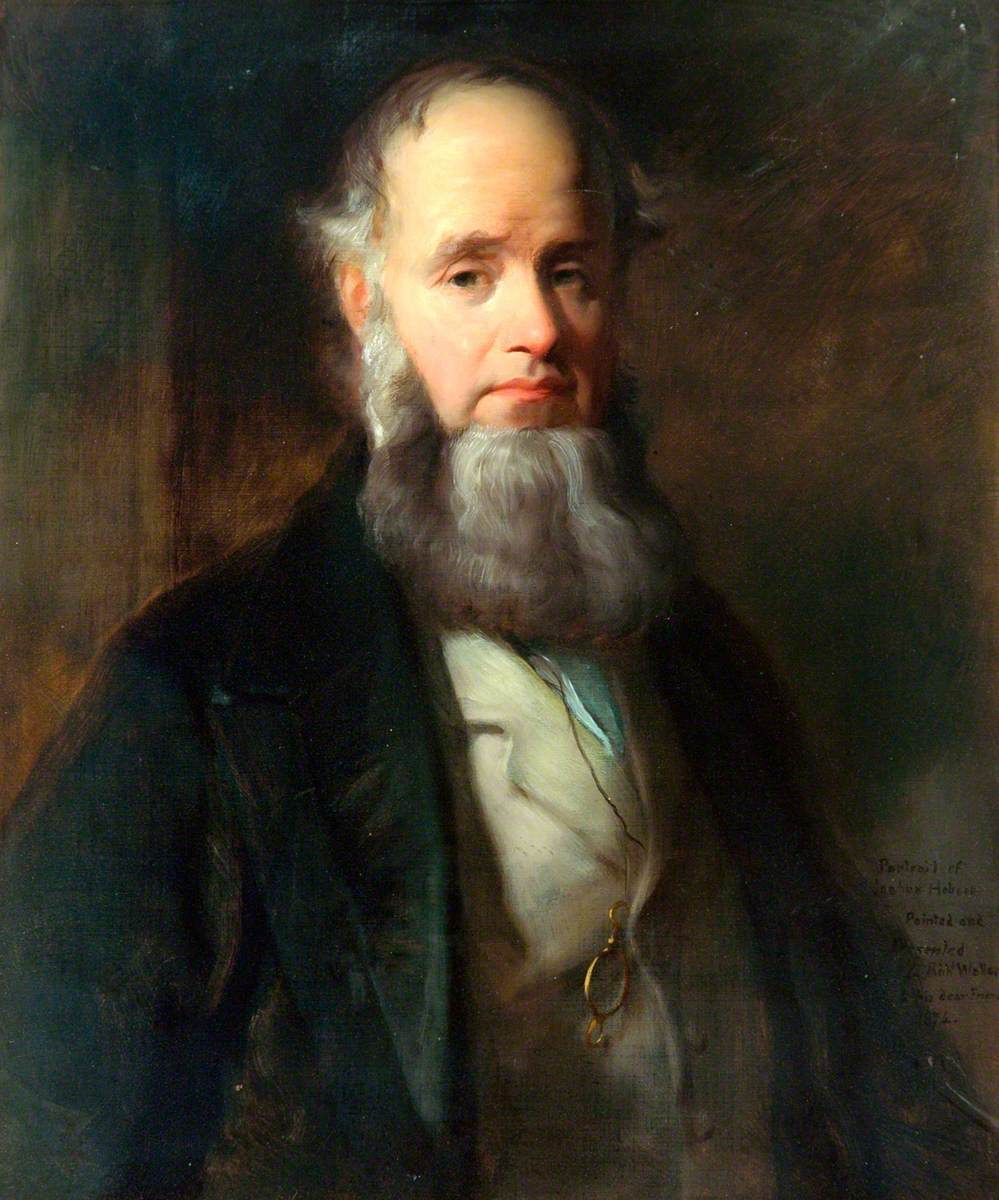
- Born: 1810; Huddersfield, Yorkshire, England
- Died: 1876 (aged 65–66)
- Occupations: Chartist, Tory Radical and publisher

Joshua Hobson (1810–1876) was a British Chartist and Tory Radical who was the first publisher of the Book of Murder, a pamphlet attacking the Poor Law Amendment Act 1834. From 1838 to 1844 he was the publisher of the Chartist newspaper Northern Star.

== Early life ==
Hobson was born in 1810 in Huddersfield, Yorkshire, there he was apprenticed as a joiner before working as a handloom weaver in nearby Oldham, Lancashire. During this time he wrote for radical papers as "the whistler at the loom".

== Political activity ==
Hobson was associated with the Tory radical Richard Oastler. He was elected to the first Central Committee of the National Association of United Trades for the Protection of Labour in 1845. In Leeds he established himself as a Radical publisher and printer, in Market Street, Briggate and this is described as "important in the history of radical, especially Owenite and Chartist publishing".

== Publishing activity ==
After publishing the Book of Murder Hobson was imprisoned for publishing further pamphlets. He was publisher and business manager of the Northern Star, the campaigning newspaper at the head of Chartism. This advocated the abolition of the Poor Law Amendment Act 1834 and a renewal of the Ten Hours Movement and trade union movement, as well as the six points of the People's Charter.

In January 1836 Hobson, alongside publisher Alice Mann, was fined (£100 for Mann and £80 for Hobson). In default of payment they were imprisoned in York Castle for six months. From 1855 to 1871 he was the editor of the Conservative-supporting newspaper the Huddersfield Chronicle.
