= Alice Mann (printer) =

English radical and publisher (1791–1865)

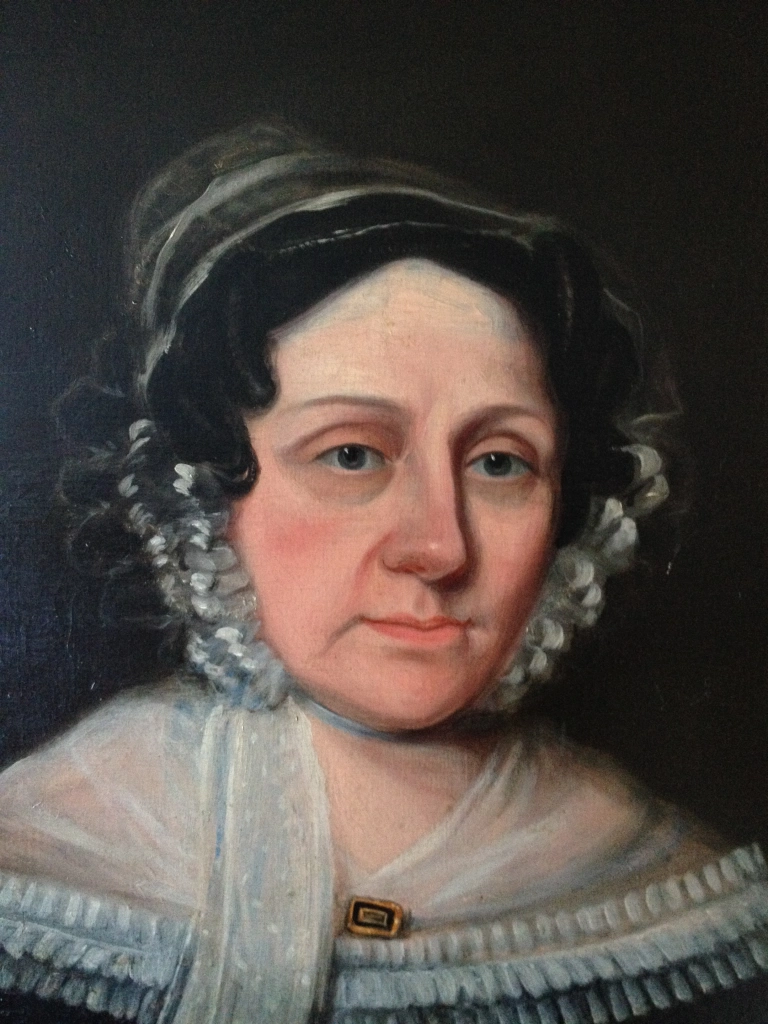
- only known portrait
- Born: Alice Burnett; 1791; Leeds, England
- Died: 1865 (aged 73–74)
- Occupations: Printer, publisher

Alice Mann (née Burnett; 1791–1865) was a Leeds-born radical and publisher. Her husband was arrested on suspicion of involvement in an armed uprising and she served a week long and a six month sentence for selling newspapers without paying the required tax.

== Biography ==
Alice Burnett was born in Hunslet Lane, Leeds in 1791. In 1807, at the age of 16, she married James Mann, a prominent West Riding political activist and bookseller. James and Alice's book shop in Briggate appeared "to be the head quarters of sedition in this town" according to the Leeds Intelligencer. James Mann died of cholera on 4 August 1832, leaving Alice widowed with nine children. She continued to sell books and added printing to the business.

In 1833 she published an edition of Catechism of the Society for Promoting National Regeneration which aspired "to remove ... the social and commercial evils now existing". She also published work by the agitator Richard Carlile, the radical Richard Oastler and William Rider's spoof life story of the publisher and politician Edward Baines titled The Demagogue.

In 1848 she and William Strange were publishing Mann’s Black Book of the British Aristocracy and she may have been its compiler. The book aimed to expose "the more monstrous abuses in the state and the church".

== Politics ==
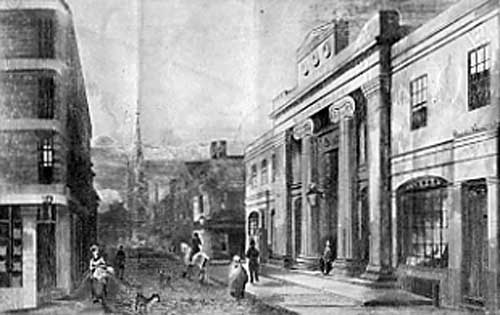
Alice Mann's shop is probably located on the left of this (undated) engraving of the Central Market in Leeds

Mann's husband was arrested in 1817 for his presumed involvement in the armed Pentrich rising which led to several men being executed. Her husband was released without any formal charges being made.

Mann served a prison sentence of a week in Wakefield Prison in 1834 for selling unstamped newspapers. In January 1836 she was found guilty again of the same offence alongside the Chartist Joshua Hobson and she was fined £100. Hobson received a lesser fine of £80. In default of payment they were both imprisoned in York Castle for six months. At the trial Mann declined to pay a reduced fine and escape prison if she ceased book-selling, saying she "had no other mode of maintaining her family".

Mann belonged to a network of radical printers and booksellers, notably Abel Heywood of Manchester and William Strange of London. Alice was involved in the Luddite and Chartist movements, and she is referred to in the chapter 'Chartism in Leeds' in the book Chartist Studies.

== Recognition ==
Mann's name is one of those featured on the sculpture Ribbons, unveiled in 2024.

== Published work ==
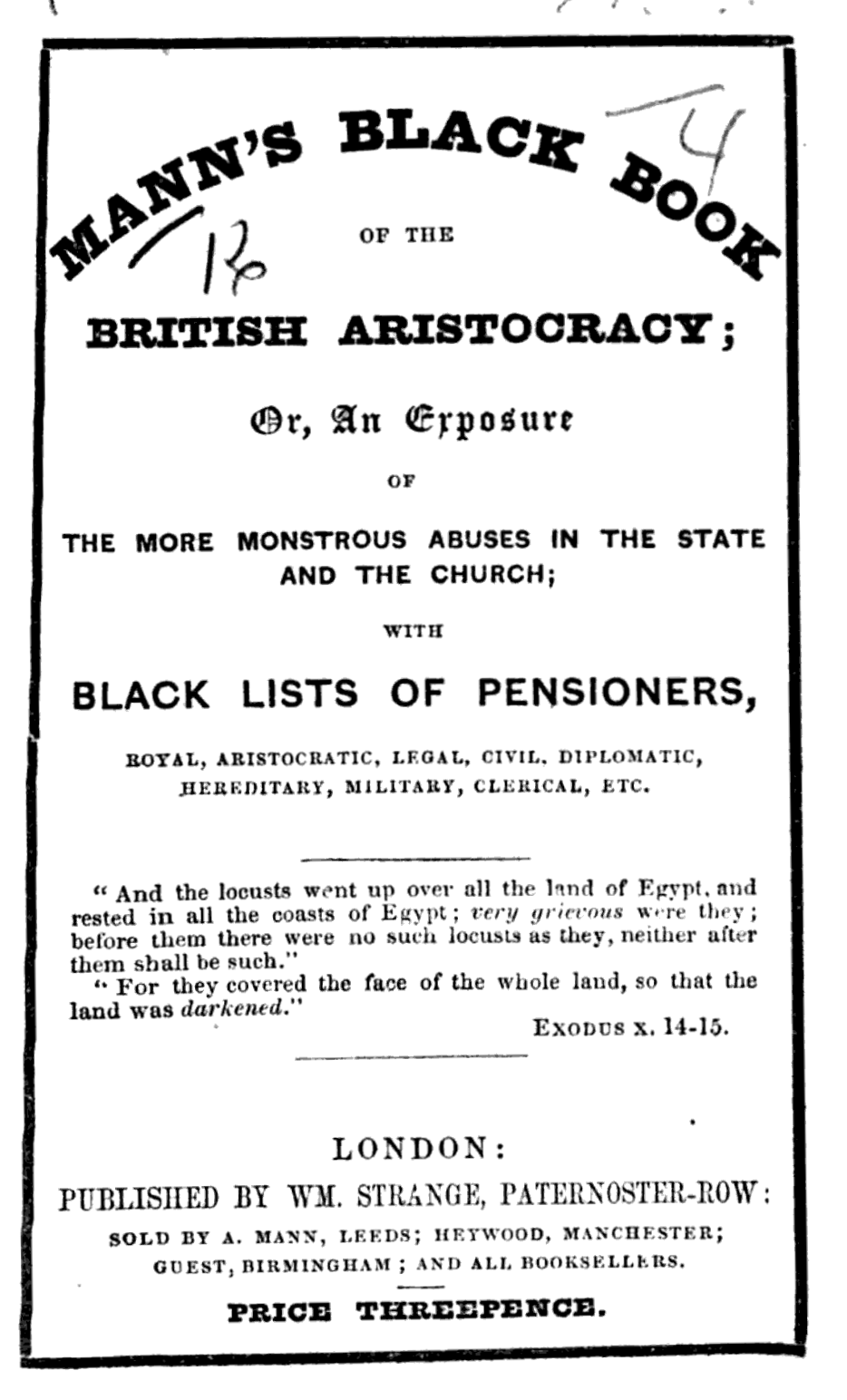
Mann’s Black Book of the British Aristocracy, 1848

- Edward Hailstone, Catechism of the Society for Promoting National Regeneration (Alice Mann, 1833)
- William Rider, The Demagogue (Alice Mann, 1834)
- Samuel Smiles, History of Ireland and the Irish People (1843). 1844 edition printed by William Strange in London.
- S. H. Collins, The Emigrant’s Complete Guide to the United States, Australia, Port Stephens, Van Dieman’s Land, New Zealand, the Cape of Good Hope, and Natal; Canada, New Brunswick and Nova Scotia; and the Auckland Islands (3 vols. in 1: 1849–50)
- Bairnsla Foaks; Annual an Pogmoor Olmenack, be Tom Treddlehoyle (various editions, Alice Mann)
- Charles Rodgers, Tom Treddlehoyle's Trip to Lunnan, to see Paxton's Great Glass Lantern (various editions, Alice Mann, 1851–53)
- Edward Hailstone and Charles Rodgers, Tom Treddlehoyle's peep at t'Manchester Art Treasures Exhebishan (Alice Mann, 1857)
- Edward Hailstone and Alice Mann, Mann's Black Book of the British Aristocracy (1867)
