= Book of the Bastiles =

1841 book by G.R.W. Baxter

The Book of the Bastiles; The history of the working of the new poor law was a book written by G.R.W. Baxter and published in 1841 . It was a collection of evidence which aimed to highlight the negative effects of the New Poor Law.

== See also ==
- Poor Law Amendment Act 1834
