= George Robert Wythen Baxter =

Welsh writer

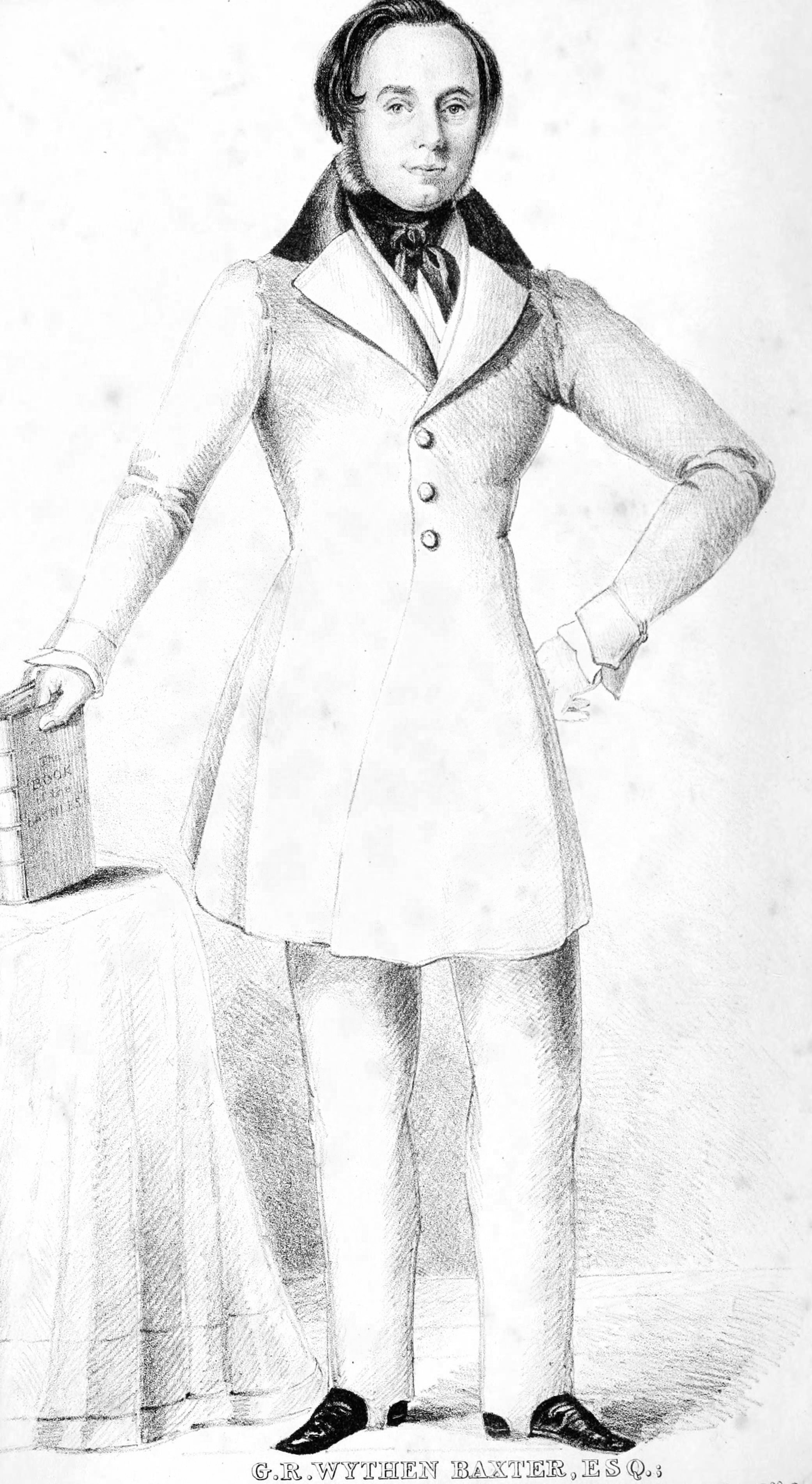
George Robert Wythen Baxter c.1841

George Robert Wythen Baxter (1815 – 17 January 1854) was a Welsh writer.

Baxter was the only son of George Trotman Baxter, Esq. of Hereford, and was born in 1815. He was a member of the old family long settled in the neighbourhood of Newton, and claimed among his ancestry the celebrated nonconformist divine, Richard Baxter, and Hugh Baxter of Ystradfaelog (1687) and Richard Baxter (1690), the names of the two latter being recorded as benefactors to the poor of Trefeglwys and Llanwnog.

He was the author of The Book of Bastiles, an attack upon the English Poor Laws, the "bastiles" being the workhouses; Humour and Pathos, and several other works. He died on 17 January 1854, in the 39th year of his age, and a marble tablet was erected to his memory by his mother in Llanllwchaiarn Church.
