= Northern Star (Chartist newspaper) =

British periodical

The Northern Star
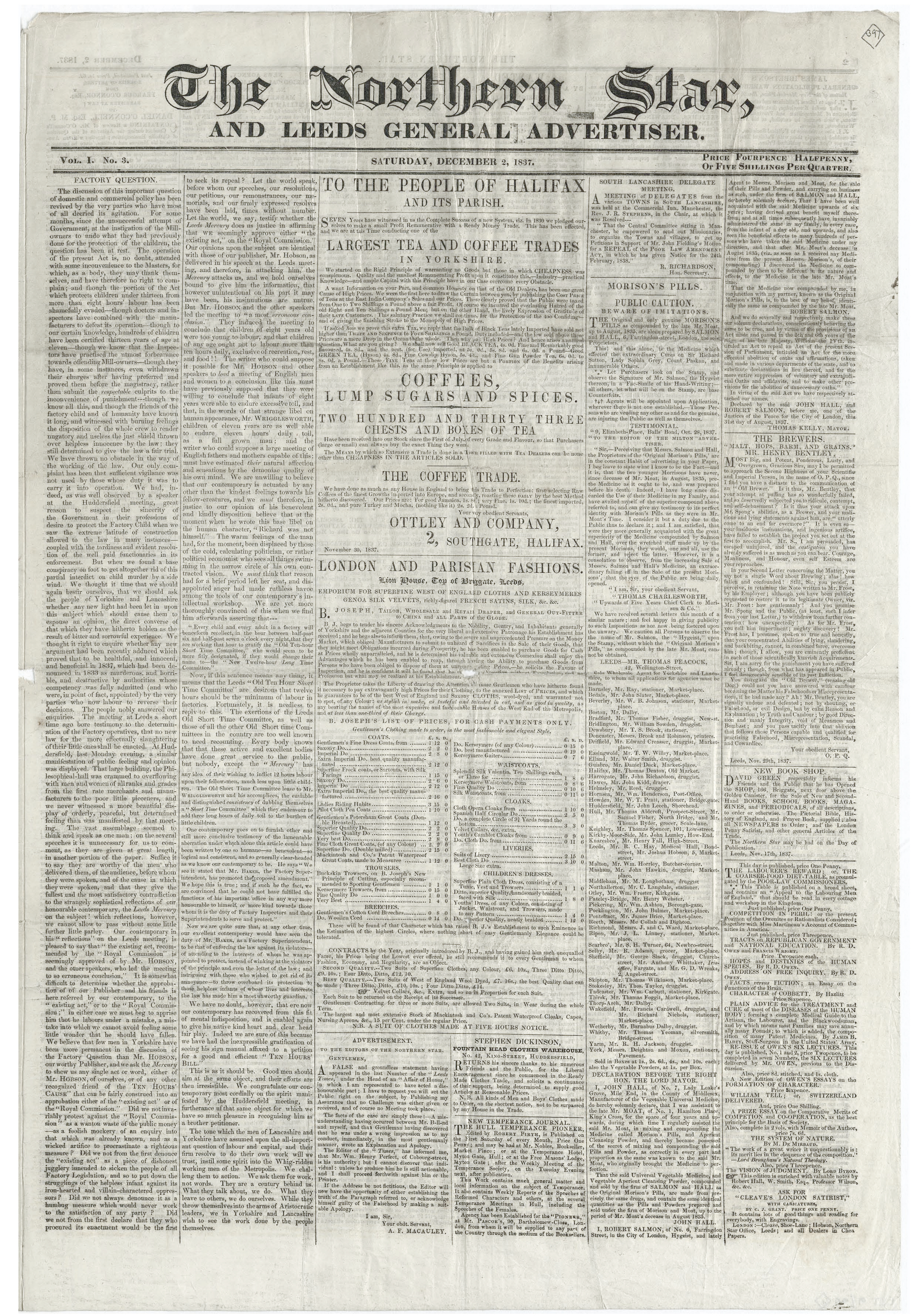
- Front page of The Northern Star and Leeds General Advertiser, 1837
- Type: Weekly newspaper
- Format: broadsheet (41 x 59 cm)
- Owner: Feargus O'Connor
- Founder: Feargus O'Connor
- Founded: 18 November 1837
- Ceased publication: 1852
- Political alignment: Chartist
- Language: English
- Headquarters: Leeds, West Yorkshire, UK
- City: Leeds
- Country: United Kingdom
- Circulation: 80,000 (in 1839)
- Free online archives: Nineteenth Century Serials Edition

The Northern Star and Leeds General Advertiser was a chartist newspaper published in Britain between 1837 and 1852, and best known for advancing the reform issues articulated by proprietor Feargus O'Connor.

== Foundation ==
Feargus O'Connor, a former Irish MP forging a career in English radical politics, decided to establish a weekly newspaper in 1837. He based it in Yorkshire, one of the heartlands of the campaigns for an extension of the Factory Acts and against the controversial Poor Law Amendment Act 1834. He chose the name Northern Star in tribute to the newspaper of the Society of United Irishmen which was suppressed by the military in Belfast in 1797. Meetings were held in Leeds, Bradford, Halifax, Huddersfield and Hull; share capital was also raised from supporters in Ashton-under-Lyne, Oldham and Rochdale. £690 was raised for the foundation of the Northern Star, which was first published on 22 November 1837.

== The newspaper ==
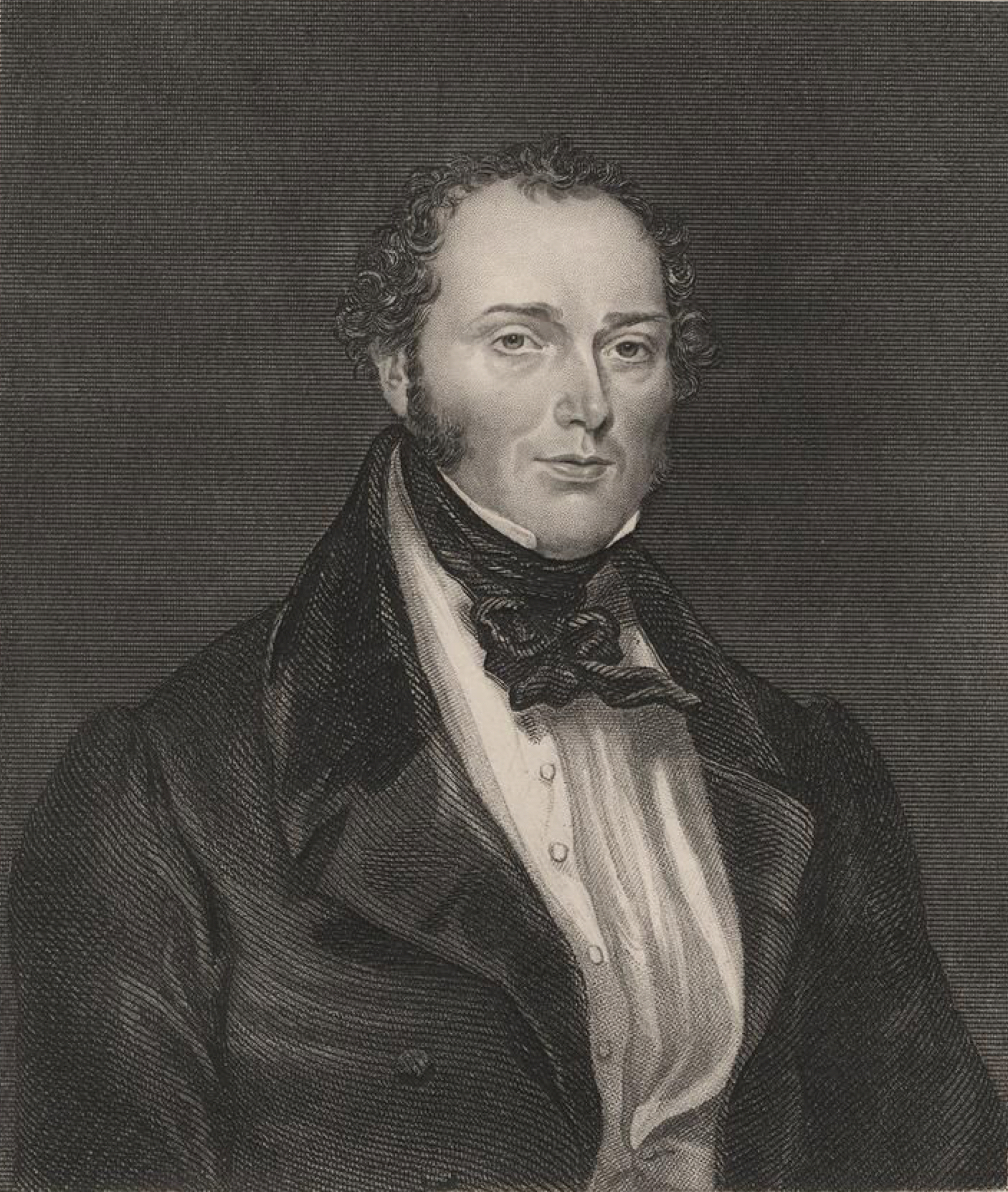
An engraving of O'Connor published in the Northern Star in 1837

The newspaper paid a stamp duty of 4d., despite O'Connor's protests that the tax restricted free speech. The Northern Star reported on chartist meetings throughout Britain and its letters page was host to lively debates on parliamentary reform. The paper led a campaign in support of the working class who suffered economically due to the introduction of new technology and falling wages (notably the handloom weavers). By September 1838 it had a circulation of 10,000, and by summer 1839 this had increased to 50,000, allowing O'Connor to make a personal profit of £13,000 by the end of the year. By the end of 1839, it had the second largest circulation of any British newspaper. The demand was so great within the first four months of operation that a new two horse power steam printing engine was bought to cope with the demand

O'Connor used the paper to help propagate the essence of the movement, to achieve reform and the ideas of The People's Charter. O'Connor was imprisoned for 18 months in March 1840 for publishing 'seditious libels' in the paper's columns, yet in truth this was an attempt to imprison the leader of the Chartists and hence deflate the movement. The Northern Star continued to sell well, however, outstripping the 6,000 copies a week sold by Robert Hartwell's The Charter with a circulation of 48,000. Whilst in prison, O'Connor also used the paper as his means of communication with the Chartists.

From its start, Northern Star was innovative. It quickly abandoned the standard practice of devoting the front page to advertisements (O'Connor's weekly letter was prominent in the columns that took their place). Unusually for a provincial paper, each issue was published in various editions (sometimes as many of eight) tailored to different regions of the country. O'Connor presented copies of engraved portraits of Chartist heroes to regular readers, effectively pioneering newspaper "give aways". The Star's poetry column not only printed the work of well-known poets such as Shelley and Shakespeare but hundreds of contributions by the paper's working-class readers. Much of the credit for the success of the Northern Star is due to its publisher and general manager, Joshua Hobson, and the founding editor, William Hill, who was also a minister of the Swedenborgian New Jerusalem Church.

In 1845 O'Connor used the Northern Star to help launch the Chartist Land Plan (the National Land Company). The same year George Julian Harney replaced William Hill as editor of the paper. Harney increasingly used the paper to advocate his internationalist outlook, for example publishing articles by Karl Marx and Friedrich Engels. O'Connor disapproved, accusing Harney and his supporters of being "Socialists first and Chartists second". The relationship between the two men was often tense, but as Harney told Engels: 'I must do O'C. the justice to say that he never interferes with what I write in the paper nor does he know what I write until he sees the paper'. It was not until May 1850 that Harney finally resigned as editor of the paper, to concentrate on his other journalistic interests.

Sales of the paper declined as the interest in the Chartist movement fell, with weekly circulation being only 1,200 by the end of 1851. O'Connor was losing interest in the campaign and sold the Northern Star to Harney in April 1852, who merged it with the Friend of the people to form the Star of Freedom. The latter appeared in a smaller format to Northern Star and to avoid the Stamp Duty printed no news. It survived only until December of the same year.

=== Names ===
- Northern Star and Leeds General Advertiser, November 1837 – November 1844
- Northern Star and National Trades' Journal, November 1844 – March 1852
- Star and National Trades Journal, 20 March 1852 – 17 April 1852
- Star of Freedom, 24 April 1852 – 27 November 1852

== Literary references ==
In Mary Barton (published in 1848), Elizabeth Gaskell describes a Sunday afternoon, in which Mary's father John “sat smoking his pipe by the fire, while he read an old ‘Northern Star’, borrowed from a neighbouring public-house”.

Charles Kingsley's 1850 novel, Alton Locke, includes a radical newspaper, the Weekly Warwhoop, owned by a Feargus O’Flynn, intended as representations of O’Connor and the Northern Star.

== Blue plaque ==
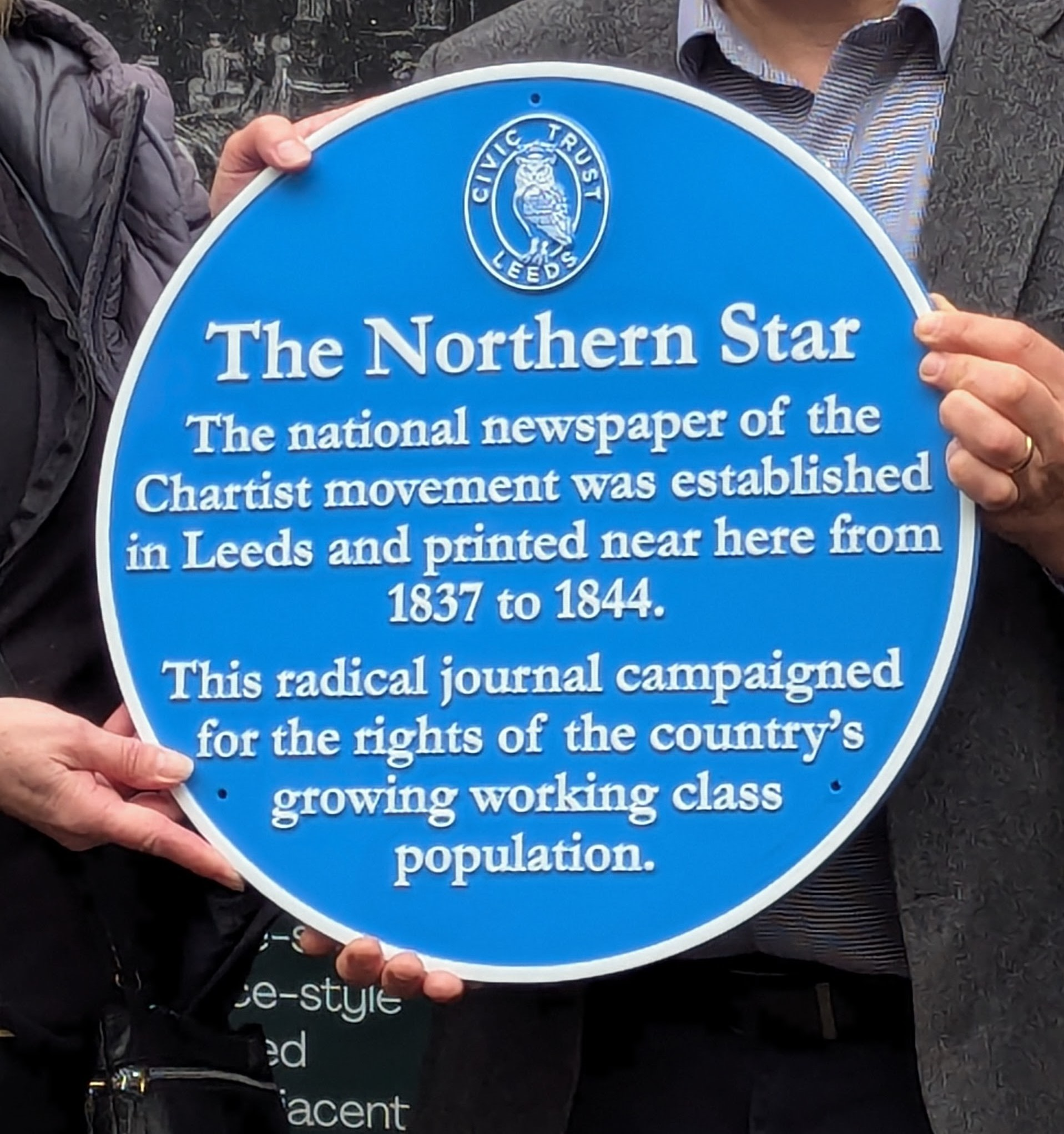
Northern Star blue plaque

On 30 November 2024, a blue plaque was unveiled by Leeds Civic Trust. The unveiling was part of wider commemoration of the historian Malcolm Chase.
